= List of butterflies of Sulawesi =

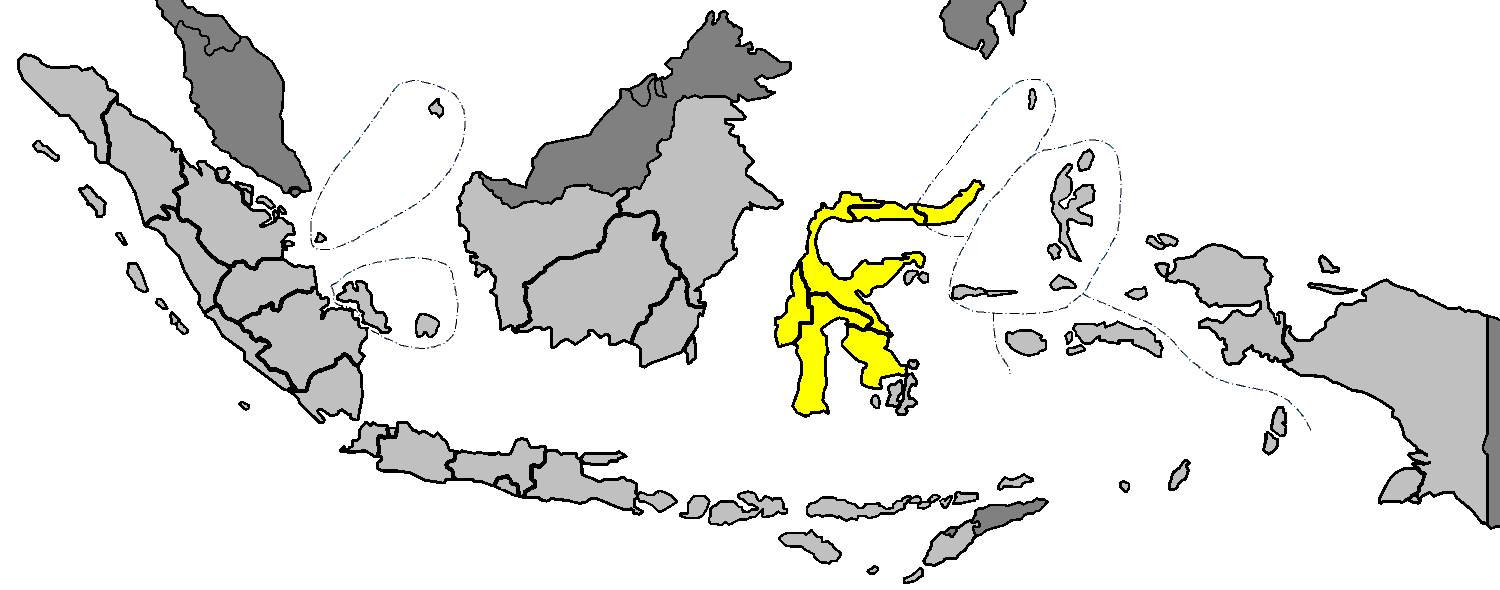
Location of Sulawesi in Indonesia

This is a list of butterflies of Sulawesi. This list includes the species found on the main island of Sulawesi, but also the species found in the Sulawesi region, which also includes the Sangihe and Talaud archipelagoes, the Banggai and Sula archipelagoes, Buton and nearby islands, the Tukangbesi archipelago and islands to the south including Selayar Island and Kalao Island. Sulawesi is in Wallacea sharing fauna between the Australasian realm and the Indomalayan realm. Sulawesi shows signs of both. About 560 species are known from Sulawesi. Of these, 239 are endemic to the region.

== Hesperiidae ==
=== Coeliadinae ===
- Burara oedipodea excellens Hopffer, 1874
- Burara tuckeri Elwes & Edwards, 1897
- Burara phul Mabille, 1876
- Burara imperialis imperialis Plötz, 1886
- Burara imperialis veteratrix Detani, 1983
- Burara aphrodite Fruhstorfer, 1905
- Burara gomata radiosa Plötz, 1885
- Bibasis iluska iluska Hewitson, 1867
- Bibasis sena senata Evans, 1934
- Hasora umbrina Mabille, 1891
- Hasora chromus Cramer, 1782
- Hasora taminatus attenuata Staudinger, 1889
- Hasora mixta fenestrata Fruhstorfer, 1911
- Hasora badra badra Moore, 1858
- Hasora sakit Maruyama & Uehara, 1992
- Hasora quadripunctata celebica Staudinger, 1889
- Hasora vitta sula Evans, 1932
- Hasora moestissima Mabille, 1876
- Hasora khoda burgeri Ribbe, 1889
- Hasora leucospila leucospila Mabille, 1891
- Badamia exclamationis Fabricius, 1775
- Choaspes plateni plateni Staudinger, 1888
- Choaspes hemixanthus wallacei Tsukiyama & Chiba, 1991

=== Pyrginae ===
- Celaenorrhinus ficulnea tola Hewitson, 1878
- Celaenorrhinus ruficornis area Plötz, 1885
- Celaenorrhinus asmara palajava Staudinger, 1889
- Celaenorrhinus dhanada snelleni Fruhstorfer, 1909
- Odina chrysomelaena Mabille, 1891
- Pseudocoladenia dan eacus Latreille, 1823
- Coladenia kehelatha Hewitson, 1878
- Gerosis celebica celebica Felder & Felder, 1867
- Gerosis celebica sulina Evans, 1932
- Tagiades japetus prasnaja Fruhstorfer, 1910
- Tagiades japetus obscurata Staudinger, 1859
- Tagiades japetus navus Fruhstorfer, 1910
- Tagiades trebellius trebellius Hopffer, 1874
- Tagiades trebellius mitra Mabille, 1895
- Tagiades trebellius sem Mabille, 1883
- Odontoptilum angulatum helias Felder & Felder, 1867
- Caprona agama agama Moore, 1858

=== Hesperiinae ===
- Halpe beturia Hewitson, 1868
- Halpe damar damar Bedford Russell, 1984
- Halpe damar tsukadai Maruyama, 1989
- Halpe albicilia Tsukiyama & Chiba, 1991
- Psolos fuligo fuscula Snellen, 1878
- Ancistroides longicornis Butler, 1874
- Notocrypta paralysos yaya Fruhstorfer, 1911
- Notocrypta feisthamelii celebensis Staudinger, 1889
- Cupitha purreea Moore, 1877
- Zographetus rama Mabille, 1877
- Zographetus abima Hewitson, 1877
- Plastingia mangola Evans, 1949
- Plastingia tessellata tessellata Hewitson, 1866
- Plastingia tessellata tessa Evans, 1949
- Plastingia flavescens Felder, 1867
- Lotongus calathus taprobanus Plötz, 1885
- Gangara thyrsis Fabricius, 1775
- Gangara tumpa de Jong, 1992
- Erionota thrax thrax Linnaeus, 1767
- Erionota hasdrubal Fruhstorfer, 1910
- Erionota hiraca sakita Ribbe, 1895
- Ilma irvina Plötz, 1886
- Matapa celsina Felder & Felder, 1867
- Matapa intermedia intermedia de Jong, 1983
- Acerbas azona Hewitson, 1866
- Acerbas latefascia de Jong, 1982
- Acerbas suttoni Bedford Russell, 1984
- Pirdana ismene Felder & Felder, 1867
- Taractrocera ardonia Hewitson, 1868
- Taractrocera luzonensis dongala Evans, 1932
- Taractrocera luzonensis bessa Evans, 1949
- Taractrocera nigrolimbata talantus Plötz, 1885
- Oriens alfurus Plötz, 1885
- Potanthus omaha nita Evans, 1934
- Potanthus fettingi nikaja Fruhstorfer, 1911
- Potanthus pava Fruhstorfer, 1911
- Potanthus hetaerus dina Evans, 1934
- Telicota colon vaja Corbet, 1942
- Telicota colon argeus Plötz, 1883
- Telicota ohara rahula Fruhstorfer, 1911
- Telicota ternatensis testa Evans, 1934
- Telicota ternatensis ranga Evans, 1949
- Telicota ternatensis sula Evans, 1949
- Cephrenes acalle acalle Hopffer, 1874
- Cephrenes augiades augiades Felder & Felder, 1860
- Prusiana kuehni kuehni Plötz, 1886
- Prusiana hercules Mabille, 1889
- Prusiana prusias matinus Fruhstorfer, 1911
- Prusiana prusias prusias Felder & Felder, 1861
- Parnara kawazoei Chiba & Eliot, 1991
- Parnara bada bada Moore, 1878
- Borbo cinnara Wallace, 1866
- Borbo bevani Moore, 1878
- Pelopidas agna agna Moore, 1866
- Pelopidas mathias mathias Fabricius, 1798
- Polytremis lubricans lubricans Herrich-Schäffer, 1869
- Caltoris bromus bromus Leech, 1894
- Caltoris philippina philippina Herrich-Schäffer, 1869
- Caltoris mehavagga Fruhstorfer, 1911
- Caltoris beraka Plötz, 1885

== Papilionidae ==
=== Papilioninae ===
- Troides hypolitus cellularis Rothschild, 1895
- Troides hypolitus caelicola Haugum & Low, 1982
- Troides hypolitus sulaensis Staudinger, 1895
- Troides helena hephaestus Felder & Felder, 1864
- Troides oblongomaculatus thestius Staudinger, 1895
- Troides oblongomaculatus bouruensis Wallace, 1865
- Troides haliphron haliphron Boisduval, 1836
- Troides haliphron pallens Oberthür, 1879
- Troides haliphron pistor Rothschild, 1896
- Troides haliphron purahu Kobayashi, 1987
- Troides criton celebensis Wallace, 1865
- Troides criton selayarensis Kobayashi & Koiwaya, 1981
- Troides dohertyi Rippon, 1893
- Ornithoptera croesus sananaensis Tsukada & Nishiyama, 1980
- Atrophaneura kuehni mesolamprus Rothschild, 1908
- Atrophaneura kuehni kuehni Honrath, 1886
- Atrophaneura dixoni Grose Smith, 1901
- Losaria palu Martin, 1912
- Pachliopta polyphontes polyphontes Boisduval, 1836
- Pachliopta polyphontes aipytos Fruhstorfer, 1908
- Pachliopta polyphontes rosea Oberthür, 1879
- Pachliopta adamas agricola Tsukada & Nishiyama, 1980
- Chilasa veiovis Hewitson, 1865
- Papilio blumei blumei Boisduval, 1836
- Papilio blumei fruhstorferi Röber, 1897
- Papilio peranthus adamantius Felder & Felder, 1864
- Papilio peranthus insulicola Rothschild, 1896
- Papilio peranthus intermedius Snellen, 1890
- Papilio peranthus kransi Jurriaanse & Lindemans, 1920
- Papilio peranthus wangiwangiensis Kitahara, 1989
- Papilio gigon gigon Felder & Felder, 1864
- Papilio gigon neriotes Rothschild, 1908
- Papilio gigon mangolinus Fruhstorfer, 1899
- Papilio sataspes sataspes Felder & Felder, 1864
- Papilio sataspes artaphernes Honrath, 1886
- Papilio sataspes ahasverus Staudinger, 1895
- Papilio hipponous Felder & Felder, 1862
- Papilio fuscus minor Oberthür, 1879
- Papilio fuscus pertinax Wallace, 1865
- Papilio fuscus lunifer Rothschild, 1895
- Papilio fuscus porrothenus Jordan, 1909
- Papilio fuscus wasiensis Hanafusa, 1991
- Papilio fuscus metagenes Fruhstorfer, 1904
- Papilio fuscus talyabona Joicey & Talbot, 1932
- Papilio alphenor perversus Rothschild, 1895
- Papilio alphenor polycritos Fruhstorfer, 1901
- Papilio polytes alcindor Oberthür, 1879
- Papilio polytes tucanus Jordan, 1909
- Papilio jordani Fruhstorfer, 1906
- Papilio rumanzovia Eschscholtz, 1821
- Papilio memnon kalaomemnon Hachitani, 1987
- Papilio ascalaphus ascalaphus Boisduval, 1836
- Papilio ascalaphus munascalaphus Hachitani, 1988
- Papilio ascalaphus fukuyamai Detani, 1983
- Papilio ascalaphus ascalon Staudinger, 1895
- Papilio demoleus libanius Fruhstorfer, 1908
- Graphium codrus celebensis Wallace, 1865
- Graphium codrus taloranus Jordan, 1909
- Graphium codrus stiris Jordan, 1909
- Graphium monticolus textrix Tsukada & Nishiyama, 1980
- Graphium monticolus monticolus Fruhstorfer, 1896
- Graphium anthedon milon Felder & Felder, 1865
- Graphium anthedon coelius Fruhstorfer, 1899
- Graphium eurypylus pamphylus Felder & Felder, 1865
- Graphium eurypylus sangira Oberthür, 1879
- Graphium eurypylus gordion Felder & Felder, 1864
- Graphium eurypylus insularis Rothschild, 1896
- Graphium eurypylus fumikoe Detani, 1983
- Graphium eurypylus arctofasciatus Lathy, 1899
- Graphium meyeri meyeri Hopffer, 1874
- Graphium meyeri extremum Tsukada & Nishiyama, 1980
- Graphium agamemnon comodus Fruhstorfer, 1903
- Graphium rhesus rhesus Boisduval, 1836
- Graphium rhesus rhesulus Fruhstorfer, 1902
- Graphium rhesus rhapia Jordan, 1908
- Graphium rhesus parvimacula Joicey & Talbot, 1922
- Graphium androcles androcles Boisduval, 1836
- Graphium androcles pelengensis Detani, 1983
- Graphium androcles cleomenes Fruhstorfer, 1911
- Graphium dorcus dorcus de Haan, 1840
- Graphium dorcus ventus Tsukada & Nishiyama, 1980
- Graphium dorcus butungensis Hanafusa, 1997
- Graphium antiphates kurosawai Igarashi, 1979
- Graphium antiphates kalaoensis Rothschild, 1896
- Graphium euphrates elegantia Tsukada & Nishiyama, 1980
- Graphium encelades Boisduval, 1836
- Graphium deucalion deucalion Boisduval, 1836
- Graphium deucalion marabuntana Detani, 1983
- Lamproptera meges ennius Felder & Felder, 1865
- Lamproptera meges akirai Tsukada & Nishiyama, 1980

== Pieridae ==
=== Coliadinae ===
- Gandaca butyrosa samanga Fruhstorfer, 1910
- Gandaca harina auriflua Fruhstorfer, 1898
- Eurema brigitta ina Eliot, 1956
- Eurema hecabe latimargo Hopffer, 1874
- Eurema hecabe sinda Fruhstorfer, 1910
- Eurema hecabe dentyris Fruhstorfer, 1910
- Eurema hecabe kalidupa Fruhstorfer, 1910
- Eurema alitha zita Felder & Felder, 1865
- Eurema alitha lorquini Felder & Felder, 1865
- Eurema alitha sangira Fruhstorfer, 1910
- Eurema alitha djampeana Fruhstorfer, 1908
- Eurema blanda norbana Fruhstorfer, 1910
- Eurema blanda odinia Fruhstorfer, 1910
- Eurema irena Corbet & Pendlebury, 1932
- Eurema celebensis celebensis Wallace, 1867
- Eurema celebensis exophthalma Fruhstorfer, 1910
- Eurema tominia tominia Vollenhoven, 1865
- Eurema tominia theristra Fruhstorfer, 1911
- Eurema tominia talissa Westwood, 1888
- Eurema tominia halesa Fruhstorfer, 1910
- Eurema tominia arsia Fruhstorfer, 1910
- Eurema tominia faunia Fruhstorfer, 1910
- Eurema tominia mangolina Fruhstorfer, 1910
- Catopsilia scylla asema Staudinger, 1885
- Catopsilia scylla bangkejana Fruhstorfer, 1903
- Catopsilia pyranthe pyranthe Linnaeus, 1758
- Catopsilia pomona flava Butler, 1869
- Catopsilia pomona dionysiades Fruhstorfer, 1911
- Catopsilia pomona rivalis Fruhstorfer, 1910

=== Pierinae ===
- Hebomoia glaucippe celebensis Wallace, 1863
- Hebomoia glaucippe uedai Morita, 1996
- Hebomoia glaucippe sangirica Fruhstorfer, 1911
- Hebomoia glaucippe sulaensis Fruhstorfer, 1908
- Hebomoia leucippe detanii Nishimura, 1983
- Pareronia tritaea tritaea Felder & Felder, 1859
- Pareronia tritaea bargylia Fruhstorfer, 1910
- Pareronia tritaea bilinearis Fruhstorfer, 1910
- Pareronia tritaea octaviae Snellen, 1894
- Pareronia tritaea binongkoensis Hanafusa, 1998
- Pareronia tritaea illustris Hanafusa, 1991
- Pareronia tritaea sarasinorum Martin, 1913
- Pareronia tritaea hermocinia Fruhstorfer, 1910
- Pareronia tritaea sulaensis Joicey & Talbot, 1926
- Ixias piepersi Snellen, 1878
- Ixias paluensis Martin, 1914
- Leptosia nina dione Wallace, 1867
- Leptosia nina aebutia Fruhstorfer, 1910
- Leptosia lignea Vollenhoven, 1865
- Elodina egnatia boisduvali Fruhstorfer, 1911
- Elodina sota Eliot, 1956
- Elodina dispar Röber, 1887
- Delias kuehni prinsi Martin, 1912
- Delias kuehni kuehni Honrath, 1886
- Delias kuehni sulana Staudinger, 1894
- Delias battana battana Fruhstorfer, 1896
- Delias battana ariae Nakano, 1993
- Delias shirozui Yata, 1981
- Delias surprisa Martin, 1913
- Delias benasu benasu Martin, 1912
- Delias zebuda Hewitson, 1862
- Delias melusina Staudinger, 1891
- Delias kazueae Kitahara, 1986
- Delias rosenbergi rosenbergi Vollenhoven, 1865
- Delias rosenbergi chrysoleuca Mitis, 1893
- Delias rosenbergi saleyerana Rothschild, 1915
- Delias rosenbergi munaensis Nakano, 1988
- Delias mitisi banggaiensis Talbot, 1928
- Delias mitisi mitisi Staudinger, 1894
- Appias lyncida gellia Fruhstorfer, 1910
- Appias lyncida lycaste Felder & Felder, 1865
- Appias lyncida lutatia Fruhstorfer, 1910
- Appias lyncida floresiana Butler, 1898
- Appias ithome Felder & Felder, 1859
- Appias hombroni hombroni Lucas, 1852
- Appias hombroni tombugensis Fruhstorfer, 1902
- Appias hombroni sulanorum Fruhstorfer, 1902
- Appias aegis polisma Hewitson, 1861
- Appias aegis aegina Fruhstorfer, 1899
- Appias aegis gerasa Fruhstorfer, 1910
- Appias urania Wallace, 1867
- Appias nero acuminata Snellen, 1890
- Appias zarinda zarinda Boisduval, 1836
- Appias zarinda phestus Westwood, 1888
- Appias zarinda sulana Fruhstorfer, 1899
- Appias albina albina Boisduval, 1836
- Appias paulina albata Hopffer, 1874
- Saletara panda nigerrima Holland, 1891
- Saletara panda watanabei Detani, 1983
- Saletara panda aurantiaca Staudinger, 1894
- Cepora timnatha timnatha Hewitson, 1862
- Cepora timnatha filia Fruhstorfer, 1902
- Cepora timnatha aurulenta Fruhstorfer, 1899
- Cepora timnatha filiola Fruhstorfer, 1899
- Cepora timnatha soror Fruhstorfer, 1899
- Cepora celebensis celebensis Rothschild, 1892
- Cepora celebensis kazuyoe Watanabe, 1987
- Cepora eurygonia Hopffer, 1874
- Cepora perimale toekangbesiensis Jurriaanse & Lindemans, 1920
- Cepora perimale kuehni Röber, 1885
- Cepora iudith Fabricius, 1787
- Cepora aspasia talautensis Niepelt, 1926
- Cepora eperia Boisduval, 1836
- Cepora fora papayatana Watanabe, 1987
- Cepora fora fora Fruhstorfer, 1897
- Cepora fora milos Watanabe, 1987
- Aoa affinis Vollenhoven, 1865
- Belenois java java Sparrman, 1767

== Lycaenidae ==
=== Miletinae ===
- Liphyra brassolis robusta Felder & Felder, 1865
- Allotinus fallax aphacus Fruhstorfer, 1913
- Allotinus major Felder & Felder, 1865
- Allotinus maximus Staudinger, 1888
- Allotinus samarensis Eliot, 1986
- Allotinus macassarensis macassarensis Holland, 1891
- Allotinus macassarensis menadensis Eliot, 1967
- Allotinus albatus Felder & Felder, 1865
- Allotinus unicolor zitema Fruhstorfer, 1916
- Logania paluana Eliot, 1986
- Logania obscura Röber, 1886
- Logania dumoga Cassidy, 1995
- Miletus boisduvali diotrophes Fruhstorfer, 1913
- Miletus boisduvali boisduvali Moore, 1858
- Miletus celinus Eliot, 1961
- Miletus rosei Cassidy, 1995
- Miletus leos maximus Holland, 1890
- Miletus leos catoleucos Fruhstorfer, 1913
- Miletus leos tellus Fruhstorfer, 1913
- Miletus leos mangolicus Fruhstorfer, 1913
- Spalgis epius substrigatus Snellen, 1878

=== Poritiinae ===
- Poritia palos Osada, 1987
- Poritia personata Osada, 1994
- Deramas nigrescens Eliot, 1964
- Deramas suwartinae Osada, 1987
- Deramas nanae Osada, 1994
- Deramas masae Kawai, 1994

=== Curetinae ===
- Curetis venata venata Fruhstorfer, 1908
- Curetis venata saleyerensis Chapman, 1915
- Curetis tagalica celebensis Felder & Felder, 1865
- Curetis tagalica talautensis Chapman, 1915
- Curetis tagalica brunnescens Ribbe, 1926

=== Aphnaeinae ===
- Cigaritis vulcanus (Fabricius, 1775)

=== Theclinae ===
- Hypochrysops species
- Hypochrysops pyrodes Cassidy 2003
- Arhopala eridanus lewara Ribbe, 1926
- Arhopala eridanus elfeta Hewitson, 1869
- Arhopala annulata Felder, 1860
- Arhopala dohertyi Bethune-Baker, 1903
- Arhopala irregularis Bethune-Baker, 1903
- Arhopala argentea Staudinger, 1888
- Arhopala sangira Bethune-Baker, 1897
- Arhopala hercules Hewitson, 1862
- Arhopala quercoides Röber, 1886
- Arhopala cleander sostrata Fruhstorfer, 1914
- Arhopala phaenops phaenops Felder, 1865
- Arhopala alitaeus alitaeus Hewitson, 1862
- Arhopala acetes Hewitson, 1862
- Arhopala tephlis bicolora Röber, 1886
- Arhopala araxes araxes Felder & Felder, 1865
- Arhopala araxes talauta Evans, 1957
- Arhopala araxes verelius Fruhstorfer, 1914
- Arhopala philander philander Felder & Felder, 1865
- Arhopala straatmani Nieuwenhuis, 1969
- Flos diardi imperiosa Fruhstorfer, 1914
- Flos kuehni Röber, 1887
- Flos arca de Nicéville, 1893
- Flos apidanus palawanus Staudinger, 1889
- Flos apidanus apidanus Cramer, 1779
- Semanga helena Röber, 1887
- Surendra vivarna samina Fruhstorfer, 1904
- Amblypodia narada confusa Riley, 1922
- Iraota rochana johnsoniana Holland, 1890
- Iraota rochana mangolina Fruhstorfer, 1911
- Hypothecla honos de Nicéville, 1898
- Loxura atymnus sulawesiensis Takanami, 1986
- Horaga syrinx permagna Fruhstorfer, 1912
- Horaga selina Grose Smith, 1895
- Horaga chalcedonyx taweya Cowan, 1966
- Horaga sohmai Osada, 2001
- Drupadia theda thaliarchus Staudinger, 1888
- Drupadia theda inexpectata Ribbe, 1926
- Drupadia theda namusa Hewitson, 1863
- Drupadia theda bangkaiensis Ribbe, 1926
- Tajuria mantra jalysus Felder & Felder, 1865
- Tajuria cyrillus Hewitson, 1865
- Tajuria iapyx iapyx Hewitson, 1865
- Tajuria iapyx bangkaianus Ribbe, 1926
- Pratapa cameria de Nicéville, 1898
- Paruparo kuehni regulus Staudinger, 1888
- Paruparo kuehni birumki Ribbe, 1926
- Paruparo kuehni kuehni Röber, 1887
- Dacalana anysis anysides Röber, 1887
- Dacalana sangirica Fruhstorfer, 1912
- Remelana jangala orsolina Hewitson, 1865
- Hypolycaena erylus gamatius Fruhstorfer, 1912
- Hypolycaena umbrata Seki & Takanami, 1988
- Hypolycaena sipylus giscon Fruhstorfer, 1912
- Hypolycaena xenia Grose Smith, 1895
- Bindahara phocides fumata Röber, 1887
- Rapala ribbei Röber, 1886
- Rapala dioetas Hewitson, 1869
- Rapala enipeus Staudinger, 1888
- Rapala cassidyi Takanami, 1992
- Rapala manea manea Hewitson, 1863
- Rapala varuna olivia Druce, 1895
- Deudorix cleora Miller & Miller, 1986
- Deudorix epijarbas megakles Fruhstorfer, 1911
- Deudorix loxius Hewitson, 1869
- Artipe eryx alax Eliot, 1956
- Sinthusa verriculata Snellen, 1892
- Sinthusa indrasari Snellen, 1878

=== Polyommatinae ===
- Anthene lycaenina Felder, 1868
- Anthene paraffinis emoloides Tite, 1966
- Anthene philo philo Hopffer, 1874
- Anthene philo scintillans Tite, 1966
- Anthene licates licates Hewitson, 1874
- Anthene villosa Snellen, 1878
- Cupidopsis jobates Hopffer, 1855
- Una usta usta Distant, 1886
- Petrelaea tombugensis Röber, 1886
- Nacaduba angusta pamela Grose Smith, 1895
- Nacaduba angusta sangira Fruhstorfer, 1916
- Nacaduba pactolus pactolides Fruhstorfer, 1916
- Nacaduba pavana azureus Röber, 1886
- Nacaduba hermus hermus Felder 1860
- Nacaduba subperusia paska Eliot, 1955
- Nacaduba sanaya metallica Fruhstorfer, 1916
- Nacaduba angelae Cassidy, 1990
- Nacaduba berenice eliana Fruhstorfer, 1916
- Nacaduba berenice zyrthis Fruhstorfer, 1916
- Nacaduba normani titei Eliot, 1969
- Nacaduba kurava menyangka Takanami, 1990
- Nacaduba beroe hayashii Takanami, 1990
- Nacaduba calauria calauria Felder, 1860
- Psychonotis piepersii Snellen, 1878
- Prosotas aluta alutina Fruhstorfer, 1916
- Prosotas nora nora Felder, 1860
- Prosotas pia elioti Tite, 1963
- Prosotas ella Toxopeus, 1930
- Prosotas gracilis gracilis Röber, 1886
- Prosotas dubiosa subardates Piepers & Snellen, 1918
- Nothodanis schaeffera schaeffera Erschoff, 1821
- Catopyrops ancyra subfestivus Röber, 1886
- Catopyrops rita bora Eliot, 1956
- Catopyrops rita altijavana Toxopeus, 1930
- Ionolyce helicon helicon Felder, 1860
- Caleta caleta caleta Hewitson, 1876
- Caleta kalawara Ribbe, 1926
- Caleta rhode rhode Hopffer, 1874
- Caleta rhode rhodana Fruhstorfer, 1918
- Caleta celebensis Staudinger, 1889
- Discolampa ethion ulyssides Grose Smith, 1895
- Discolampa ilissus ilissus Felder, 1859
- Jamides bochus phaidon Fruhstorfer, 1915
- Jamides seminiger tiglath Fruhstorfer, 1915
- Jamides biru Ribbe, 1926
- Jamides cyta zelia Fruhstorfer, 1916
- Jamides cyta hellada Fruhstorfer, 1916
- Jamides snelleni Röber, 1886
- Jamides celeno optimus Röber, 1886
- Jamides celeno kalawarus Ribbe, 1926
- Jamides tsukadai Takanami, 1994
- Jamides fractilinea Tite, 1960
- Jamides aratus lunata de Nicéville, 1899
- Jamides aratus makitai Takanami, 1987
- Jamides aratus djampeana Snellen, 1890
- Jamides aratus minthe Fruhstorfer, 1916
- Jamides cleodus Felder & Felder, 1865
- Jamides philatus philatus Snellen, 1878
- Jamides elioti Hirowatari & Cassidy, 1994
- Jamides festivus festivus Röber, 1886
- Jamides festivus bangkaia Ribbe, 1926
- Jamides alecto luniger Toxopeus, 1930
- Jamides alecto latimargus Snellen, 1878
- Jamides alecto alvenus Fruhstorfer, 1916
- Jamides halus Takanami, 1994
- Jamides pseudosias echeilea Fruhstorfer, 1916
- Jamides schatzi Röber, 1886
- Jamides elpis espada Fruhstorfer, 1916
- Jamides elpis comeda Fruhstorfer, 1916
- Jamides celebica Eliot, 1969
- Catochrysops strabo celebensis Tite, 1959
- Catochrysops strabo luzonensis Tite, 1959
- Catochrysops strabobinna Swinhoe, 1916
- Catochrysops panormus Felder, 1860
- Lampides boeticus Linnaeus, 1767
- Castalius rosimon silas Fruhstorfer, 1922
- Castalius fasciatus adorabilis Fruhstorfer, 1918
- Castalius fasciatus fasciatus Röber, 1887
- Castalius clathratus Holland, 1891
- Castalius fluvialis Grose Smith, 1895
- Famegana alsulus kalawarus Ribbe, 1926
- Pithecops corvus corax Fruhstorfer, 1917
- Pithecops phoenix Röber, 1886
- Leptotes plinius plutarchus Fruhstorfer, 1922
- Leptotes plinius celis Fruhstorfer, 1922
- Leptotes plinius zingis Fruhstorfer, 1922
- Zizeeria karsandra karsandra Moore, 1865
- Zizina otis tanagra Felder, 1860
- Zizula hylax hylax Fabricius, 1775
- Everes lacturnus Godart, 1824
- Neopithecops sumbanus sumbanus Eliot & Kawazoé, 1983
- Neopithecops umbretta tituria Fruhstorfer, 1919
- Neopithecops umbretta dorothea Eliot & Kawazoé, 1983
- Megisba malaya sikkima Moore, 1884
- Cebrella species
- Sancterila deliciosa deliciosa Pagenstecher, 1896
- Sancterila deliciosa sohmai Eliot & Kawazoé, 1983
- Sancterila russelli Eliot & Kawazoé, 1983
- Sancterila drakei Cassidy, 1995
- Udara dilecta thoria Fruhstorfer, 1910
- Udara rona rona Grose Smith, 1894
- Udara placidula placidula Druce, 1895
- Udara camenae euphon Fruhstorfer, 1910
- Udara aristius lewari Ribbe, 1926
- Udara aristius aristius Fruhstorfer, 1910
- Udara etsuzoi Eliot & Kawazoé, 1983
- Sidima sulawesiana Eliot & Kawazoé, 1983
- Acytolepis puspa kuehni Röber, 1886
- Acytolepis puspa deronda Fruhstorfer, 1922
- Acytolepis najara Fruhstorfer, 1910
- Acytolepis samanga Fruhstorfer, 1910
- Celastrina philippina gradeniga Fruhstorfer, 1910
- Celastrina philippina philippina Semper, 1889
- Celastrina lavendularis lyce Grose Smith, 1896
- Uranobothria celebica Fruhstorfer, 1917
- Uranobothria tsukadai Eliot & Kawazoé, 1983
- Monodontides kolari Ribbe, 1926
- Monodontides cara de Nicéville, 1898
- Euchrysops cnejus luzonicus Röber, 1886
- Luthrodes boopis boopis (Fruhstorfer, 1897)
- Chilades lajus cromyon Fruhstorfer, 1916
- Freyeria putli (Kollar, [1844])

== Riodinidae ==
=== Nemeobiinae ===
- Zemeros flegyas celebensis Fruhstorfer, 1899
- Zemeros flegyas sosiphanes Fruhstorfer, 1912
- Zemeros emesoides Felder & Felder, 1860
- Abisara echerius bugiana Fruhstorfer, 1904
- Abisara echerius celebica Röber, 1886
- Abisara echerius saleyra Fruhstorfer, 1914
- Abisara echerius satellitica Nieuwenhuis, 1946
- Abisara echerius porphyritica Fruhstorfer, 1914
- Abisara kausambi sabina Stichel, 1924

== Nymphalidae ==
=== Libytheinae ===
- Libythea narina canuleia Fruhstorfer, 1909
- Libythea geoffroy celebensis Staudinger, 1889

=== Morphinae ===
- Faunis menado menado Hewitson, 1865
- Faunis menado zenica Fruhstorfer, 1911
- Faunis menado klados Brooks, 1933
- Faunis menado chitone Hewitson, 1862
- Faunis menado fruhstorferi Röber, 1896
- Faunis menado pleonasma Röber, 1896
- Faunis menado intermedius Röber, 1896
- Faunis menado syllus Fruhstorfer, 1911
- Faunis menado sulanus Fruhstorfer, 1899
- Amathusia phidippus celebensis Fruhstorfer, 1763
- Amathusia virgata thoanthea Fruhstorfer, 1911
- Amathusia virgata virgata Butler, 1870
- Amathuxidia plateni plateni Staudinger, 1855
- Amathuxidia plateni iamos Brooks, 1937
- Amathuxidia plateni pelengensis Okano, 1986
- Amathuxidia plateni suprema Fruhstorfer, 1899
- Discophora bambusae bambusae Felder & Felder, 1865
- Discophora bambusae celebensis Holland, 1891
- Discophora bambusae bangkaiensis Fruhstorfer, 1902

=== Satyrinae ===
- Bletogona mycalesis unicolor Martin, 1929
- Bletogona mycalesis mycalesis Felder & Felder, 1867
- Bletogona inexspectata Uémura, 1987
- Melanitis leda celebicola Martin, 1929
- Melanitis leda leda Linnaeus, 1758
- Melanitis leda bouruana Holland, 1900
- Melanitis phedima linga Fruhstorfer, 1908
- Melanitis velutina velutina Felder & Felder, 1867
- Melanitis velutina ribbei Röber, 1886
- Melanitis velutina panvila Fruhstorfer, 1911
- Melanitis atrax pitya Fruhstorfer, 1911
- Melanitis boisduvalia ernita Fruhstorfer, 1911
- Melanitis pyrrha hylecoetes Holland, 1890
- Melanitis pyrrha pyrrha Röber, 1887
- Melanitis constantia salapia Fruhstorfer, 1911
- Elymnias cumaea cumaea Felder & Felder, 1867
- Elymnias cumaea toliana Fruhstorfer, 1899
- Elymnias cumaea resplendens Martin, 1929
- Elymnias cumaea bornemanni Ribbe, 1889
- Elymnias cumaea phrikonis Fruhstorfer, 1899
- Elymnias sangira Fruhstorfer, 1899
- Elymnias mimalon mimalon Hewitson, 1862
- Elymnias mimalon ino Fruhstorfer, 1894
- Elymnias mimalon nysa Fruhstorfer, 1907
- Elymnias hicetas rarior Martin, 1929
- Elymnias hicetas hicetas Wallace, 1869
- Elymnias hicetas bonthainensis Fruhstorfer, 1899
- Elymnias hicetas hicetina Fruhstorfer, 1904
- Elymnias hicetas butona Fruhstorfer, 1904
- Elymnias hewitsoni hewitsoni Wallace, 1869
- Elymnias hewitsoni atys Fruhstorfer, 1907
- Elymnias hewitsoni meliophila Fruhstorfer, 1896
- Zethera incerta incerta Hewitson, 1869
- Zethera incerta tenggara Roos, 1992
- Zethera musa Felder & Felder, 1861
- Lethe europa arcuata Butler, 1868
- Lethe europa nagaraja Fruhstorfer, 1911
- Lethe europa velitra Fruhstorfer, 1911
- Lethe europa anatha Fruhstorfer, 1911
- Lethe violae Tsukada & Nishiyama, 1979
- Orsotriaena medus medus Fabricius, 1775
- Orsotriaena jopas jopas Hewitson, 1864
- Orsotriaena jopas mendice Fruhstorfer, 1911
- Orsotriaena jopas paupercula Fruhstorfer, 1908
- Mycalesis itys itys Felder, 1867
- Mycalesis itys remulina Fruhstorfer, 1897
- Mycalesis itys sulensis Grose Smith & Kirby, 1896
- Mycalesis janardana opaculus Fruhstorfer, 1908
- Mycalesis janardana besina Fruhstorfer, 1908
- Mycalesis perseus lalassis Hewitson, 1864
- Mycalesis horsfieldi tessimus Fruhstorfer, 1908
- Mycalesis horsfieldi newayana Fruhstorfer, 1911
- Mycalesis horsfieldi ptyleus Fruhstorfer, 1908
- Mycalesis mynois Hewitson, 1864
- Mycalesis mineus Linnaeus, 1758
- Mycalesis sirius Fabricius, 1775
- Lohora dexamenus Hewitson, 1862
- Lohora transiens Fruhstorfer, 1908
- Lohora dinon Hewitson, 1864
- Lohora tilmara Fruhstorfer, 1906
- Lohora anna Vane-Wright & Fermon, 2003
- Lohora ophthalmicus Westwood, 1888
- Lohora unipupillata Fruhstorfer, 1898
- Lohora haasei Röber, 1887
- Lohora muelleri Roos, 2015
- Lohora inga Fruhstorfer, 1899
- Lohora pandaea Hopffer, 1874
- Lohora deianirina Fruhstorfer, 1897
- Lohora decipiens Martin, 1929
- Lohora umbrosa Roos, 1997
- Lohora deianira Hewitson, 1862
- Lohora imitatrix Martin, 1929
- Lohora erna Fruhstorfer, 1898
- Lohora tanuki Tsukada & Nishiyama, 1979
- Nirvanopsis hypnus Tsukada & Nishiyama, 1979
- Acrophtalmia leuce leuce Felder & Felder, 1867
- Acrophtalmia leuce banggaaiensis Nieuwenhuis, 1946
- Acrophtalmia leuce chionides de Nicéville, 1900
- Acrophtalmia windorum Miller & Miller, 1978
- Ypthimina nynias nynias Fruhstorfer, 1911
- Ypthimina nynias aretas Fruhstorfer, 1911
- Ypthimina nynias gadames Fruhstorfer, 1911
- Ypthimina norma pusilla Fruhstorfer, 1911
- Ypthimina kalelonda kalelonda Westwood, 1888
- Ypthimina kalelonda celebensis Rothschild, 1892
- Ypthimina kalelonda anana Fruhstorfer, 1911
- Ypthimina kalelonda mangolina Uémura, 1982
- Ypthimina risompae Uémura, 1982
- Ypthimina ancus Fruhstorfer, 1911
- Ypthimina gavalisi Martin, 1913
- Ypthimina junkoae Uémura, 1999
- Ypthimina loryma Hewitson, 1865

=== Charaxinae ===
- Charaxes latona artemis Rothschild, 1900
- Charaxes nitebis nitebis Hewitson, 1862
- Charaxes nitebis sulaensis Rothschild, 1900
- Charaxes affinis affinis Butler, 1865
- Charaxes affinis butongensis Tsukada, 1991
- Charaxes affinis spadix Tsukada, 1991
- Charaxes musashi Tsukada, 1991
- Charaxes mars Staudinger, 1885
- Charaxes setan Detani, 1983
- Charaxes solon hannibal Butler, 1869
- Charaxes solon catulus Fruhstorfer, 1914
- Charaxes solon brevis Tsukada, 1991
- Charaxes solon iliona Tsukada, 1991
- Charaxes solon mangolianus Rothschild, 1900
- Charaxes bernardus repetitius Butler, 1896
- Polyura inopinatus Röber, 1939
- Polyura cognatus cognatus Vollenhoven, 1861
- Polyura cognatus bellona Tsukada, 1991
- Polyura cognatus yumikoe Nishimura, 1984
- Polyura alphius piepersianus Martin, 1924
- Polyura galaxia kalaonicus Rothschild, 1898

=== Biblidinae ===
- Chersonesia rahria celebensis Rothschild, 1892
- Chersonesia rahria banggaina Tsukada & Nishiyama, 1985
- Chersonesia rahria mangolina Fruhstorfer, 1899
- Cyrestis paulinus mantilis Staudinger, 1886
- Cyrestis paulinus kransi Jurriaanse & Lindemans, 1920
- Cyrestis paulinus kuehni Röber, 1886
- Cyrestis paulinus seneca Wallace, 1869
- Cyrestis heracles heracles Staudinger, 1896
- Cyrestis heracles selayarensis Hanafusa, 1993
- Cyrestis thyonneus celebensis Staudinger, 1896
- Cyrestis thyonneus pelensis Detani, 1983
- Cyrestis thyonneus sulaensis Staudinger, 1896
- Cyrestis eximia Oberthür, 1879
- Cyrestis strigata strigata Felder & Felder, 1867
- Cyrestis strigata parthenia Röber, 1887
- Cyrestis strigata bettina Fruhstorfer, 1899
- Ariadne ariadne gedrosia Fruhstorfer, 1912
- Ariadne specularia intermedia Fruhstorfer, 1899
- Ariadne celebensis dongalae Fruhstorfer, 1903
- Ariadne celebensis celebensis Holland, 1891
- Ariadne merionoides merionoides Holland, 1891
- Ariadne merionoides pecten Tsukada, 1985
- Ariadne merionoides sulaensis Joicey & Talbot, 1922
- Laringa castelnaui Felder & Felder, 1860
- Dichorragia nesimachus pelurius Fruhstorfer, 1897
- Dichorragia nesimachus harpalycus Fruhstorfer, 1913
- Dichorragia nesimachus peisandrus Fruhstorfer, 1913
- Pseudergolis avesta avesta Felder & Felder, 1867
- Pseudergolis avesta toalarum Fruhstorfer, 1912
- Pseudergolis avesta nimbus Tsukada, 1991
- Tarattia lysanias lysanias Hewitson, 1859
- Tarattia lysanias aberrans Hanafusa, 1989
- Tarattia lysanias hiromii Hanafusa, 1989
- Tarattia lysanias karschi Fruhstorfer, 1912
- Tarattia bruijni Oberthür, 1879
- Athyma libnites libnites Hewitson, 1859
- Athyma libnites noctesco Tsukada, 1991
- Athyma libnites nieuwenhuisi Hanafusa, 1989
- Moduza lymire lymire Hewitson, 1859
- Moduza lymire munaensis Hanafusa, 1989
- Moduza lymire nectareus Tsukada, 1991
- Moduza lymire citatus Tsukada, 1991
- Moduza lymire potens Hanafusa, 1989
- Moduza lymire neolymira Fruhstorfer, 1913
- Moduza lycone lycone Hewitson, 1859
- Moduza lycone lyconides Fruhstorfer, 1913
- Moduza lycone kojimai Detani, 1983
- Moduza lycone nubilus Tsukada, 1991
- Lamasia lyncides lyncides Hewitson, 1859
- Lamasia lyncides eutenia Fruhstorfer, 1913
- Lamasia lyncides togiana Tsukada, 1991
- Lamasia lyncides notus Tsukada, 1991
- Lamasia lyncides amarapta Fruhstorfer, 1913
- Tacola eulimene badoura Butler, 1866
- Tacola eulimene hegelochus Fruhstorfer, 1913
- Tacola eulimene symphelus Fruhstorfer, 1913
- Pantoporia antara antara Moore, 1858
- Pantoporia antara pytheas Fruhstorfer, 1913
- Pantoporia antara sulana Eliot, 1969
- Lasippa neriphus tawayana Fruhstorfer, 1899
- Lasippa neriphus sangira Fruhstorfer, 1908
- Lasippa neriphus neriphus Hewitson, 1868
- Neptis celebica oresta Fruhstorfer, 1913
- Neptis celebica arachroa Fruhstorfer, 1913
- Neptis celebica celebica Moore, 1899
- Neptis cymela anemorcia Fruhstorfer, 1913
- Neptis ida ida Moore, 1858
- Neptis ida celebensis Hopffer, 1874
- Neptis ida sphaerica Fruhstorfer, 1907
- Neptis ida saleyra Fruhstorfer, 1908
- Neptis ida liliputa Martin, 1924
- Neptis ida kalidupa Eliot, 1969
- Neptis hylas timorensis Röber, 1891
- Phaedyma daria daria Felder & Felder, 1867
- Phaedyma daria hiereia Fruhstorfer, 1913
- Phaedyma daria albescens Rothschild, 1892
- Phaedyma daria osima Fruhstorfer, 1913
- Parthenos sylvia salentia Hopffer, 1874
- Parthenos sylvia sangira Talbot, 1932
- Parthenos sylvia bangkaiensis Fruhstorfer, 1913
- Parthenos sylvia sulana Fruhstorfer, 1898
- Lexias aeetes aeetes Hewitson, 1861
- Lexias aeetes phasiana Butler, 1870
- Lexias aeetes satellita Jurriaanse & Lindemans, 1920
- Lexias aeetes butongensis Tsukada, 1991
- Lexias aeetes rubellio Fruhstorfer, 1898
- Lexias aeropa orestias Fruhstorfer, 1913
- Euthalia aconthea bakrii Müller, 1994
- Euthalia amanda amanda Hewitson, 1862
- Euthalia amanda selayarensis Tsukada, 1991
- Euthalia amanda periya Fruhstorfer, 1913
- Euthalia amabilis Staudinger, 1896
- Dophla evelina bolitissa Fruhstorfer, 1913
- Dophla evelina dermoides Rothschild, 1892
- Dophla evelina bangkaiana Fruhstorfer, 1904
- Dophla evelina fumosa Fruhstorfer, 1899
- Bassarona labotas labotas Hewitson, 1864
- Bassarona labotas pallesco Tsukada, 1991
- Bassarona labotas pelengensis Yokochi, 1990

=== Apaturinae ===
- Rohana macar macar Wallace, 1869
- Rohana macar butongensis Tsukada, 1991
- Helcyra celebensis celebensis Martin, 1913
- Helcyra celebensis fabulose Tsukada, 1991
- Helcyra celebensis semifusca Masui, 1999
- Hestinalis divona Hewitson, 1851
- Euripus robustus Wallace, 1869

=== Nymphalinae ===
- Symbrenthia lilaea utakata Tsukada & Nishiyama, 1985
- Symbrenthia hippoclus clausus Fruhstorfer, 1904
- Symbrenthia hippoclus confluens Fruhstorfer, 1896
- Symbrenthia hippoclus centho Fruhstorfer, 1904
- Symbrenthia platena Staudinger, 1896
- Symbrenthia hippalus Felder & Felder, 1867
- Symbrenthia intricata Fruhstorfer, 1897
- Vanessa buana Fruhstorfer, 1898
- Kaniska canace muscosa Tsukada & Nishiyama, 1979
- Junonia hedonia intermedia Felder & Felder, 1867
- Junonia hedonia ida Cramer, 1775
- Junonia hedonia teurnia Fruhstorfer, 1912
- Junonia atlites acera Fruhstorfer, 1912
- Junonia almana battana Fruhstorfer, 1906
- Junonia erigone gardineri Fruhstorfer, 1902
- Junonia timorensis kucil Tsukada & Kaneko, 1985
- Junonia orithya kontinentalis Martin, 1920
- Junonia orithya celebensis Staudinger, 1888
- Junonia orithya saleyra Fruhstorfer, 1912
- Junonia orithya kuehni Fruhstorfer, 1904
- Junonia orithya orthosia Godart, 1823
- Yoma sabina nimbus Tsukada, 1985
- Yoma sabina magnus Tsukada, 1985
- Rhinopalpa polynice megalonice Felder & Felder, 1867
- Hypolimnas dimona Fruhstorfer, 1913
- Hypolimnas diomea diomea Hewitson, 1861
- Hypolimnas diomea fraterna Wallace, 1869
- Hypolimnas diomea sororia Hall, 1930
- Hypolimnas diomea serica Tsukada, 1985
- Hypolimnas anomala stellata Fruhstorfer, 1912
- Hypolimnas anomala anomala Wallace, 1869
- Hypolimnas antilope phalkes Fruhstorfer, 1908
- Hypolimnas antilope antilope Cramer, 1777
- Hypolimnas bolina bolina Linnaeus, 1758
- Hypolimnas bolina gigas Oberthür, 1879
- Hypolimnas alimena talauta Fruhstorfer, 1912
- Hypolimnas alimena alimena Linnaeus, 1758
- Hypolimnas misippus Linnaeus, 1764
- Doleschallia polibete celebensis Fruhstorfer, 1899
- Doleschallia polibete polibete maturitas Tsukada, 1985
- Doleschallia polibete polibete sulaensis Fruhstorfer, 1899

=== Danainae ===
- Parantica cleona luciplena Fruhstorfer, 1892
- Parantica cleona talautica Snellen, 1896
- Parantica cleona lucida Fruhstorfer, 1899
- Parantica sulewattan Fruhstorfer, 1896
- Parantica toxopei Nieuwenhuis, 1969
- Parantica kuekenthali Pagenstecher, 1896
- Parantica dabrerai Miller & Miller, 1978
- Parantica hypowattan Morishita, 1981
- Parantica menadensis menadensis Moore, 1883
- Parantica menadensis niuwenhuisi Detani, 1983
- Ideopsis juventa tontoliensis Fruhstorfer, 1897
- Ideopsis juventa tawaya Fruhstorfer, 1904
- Ideopsis juventa ultramontana Martin, 1914
- Ideopsis juventa ishma Butler, 1869
- Ideopsis juventa lirungensis Fruhstorfer, 1899
- Ideopsis juventa satellitica Fruhstorfer, 1899
- Ideopsis juventa sequana Fruhstorfer, 1910
- Ideopsis juventa homonyma Bryk, 1937
- Ideopsis juventa kallatia Fruhstorfer, 1904
- Ideopsis juventa lycosura Fruhstorfer, 1910
- Ideopsis juventa sophonisbe Fruhstorfer, 1904
- Ideopsis vitrea vitrea Blanchard, 1853
- Ideopsis vitrea arachosia Fruhstorfer, 1910
- Ideopsis vitrea ribbei Röber, 1887
- Ideopsis vitrea iza Fruhstorfer, 1898
- Tirumala choaspes choaspes Butler, 1886
- Tirumala choaspes kalawara Martin, 1913
- Tirumala choaspes kroeseni Martin, 1910
- Tirumala choaspes oxynthas Fruhstorfer, 1911
- Tirumala limniace makassara Martin, 1910
- Tirumala limniace bentenga Martin, 1910
- Tirumala limniace conjuncta Moore, 1883
- Tirumala limniace ino Butler, 1871
- Tirumala hamata goana Martin, 1910
- Tirumala hamata talautensis Talbot, 1943
- Tirumala hamata arikata Fruhstorfer, 1910
- Tirumala ishmoides ishmoides Moore, 1883
- Danaus plexippus plexippus Linnaeus, 1758
- Danaus ismare alba Morishita, 1981
- Danaus ismare fulvus Ribbe, 1890
- Danaus genutia leucoglene Felder & Felder, 1865
- Danaus genutia telmissus Fruhstorfer, 1910
- Danaus genutia tychius Fruhstorfer, 1910
- Danaus affinis fulgurata Butler, 1866
- Danaus affinis taruna Fruhstorfer, 1899
- Danaus affinis affinoides Fruhstorfer, 1899
- Danaus affinis wentholti Martin, 1914
- Danaus affinis djampeana Van Eecke, 1915
- Danaus affinis hegesippinus Röber, 1891
- Danaus affinis decentralis Fruhstorfer, 1899
- Danaus melanippus celebensis Staudinger, 1889
- Danaus melanippus meridionigra Martin, 1913
- Danaus chrysippus gelderi Snellen, 1891
- Danaus chrysippus bataviana Moore, 1883
- Danaus chrysippus cratippus Felder, 1860
- Euploea magou Martin, 1912
- Euploea sylvester schlegelii Felder & Felder, 1865
- Euploea sylvester glarang Martin, 1912
- Euploea sylvester agapa Fruhstorfer, 1911
- Euploea phaenareta celebica Fruhstorfer, 1898
- Euploea phaenareta rolanda Fruhstorfer, 1904
- Euploea phaenareta locupletior Fruhstorfer, 1899
- Euploea configurata Felder & Felder, 1865
- Euploea eupator eupator Hewitson, 1858
- Euploea eupator vanoorti Jurriaanse & Lindemans, 1920
- Euploea eupator thrasetes Fruhstorfer, 1911
- Euploea eupator sulaensis Joicey & Talbot, 1922
- Euploea leucostictos lykeia Fruhstorfer, 1910
- Euploea leucostictos depuiseti Oberthür, 1879
- Euploea westwoodii meyeri Hopffer, 1874
- Euploea westwoodii westwoodii Felder & Felder, 1865
- Euploea westwoodii leochares Fruhstorfer, 1910
- Euploea westwoodii bangkaiensis Fruhstorfer, 1899
- Euploea westwoodii labreyi Moore, 1883
- Euploea cordelia Martin, 1912
- Euploea eleusina vollenhovii Felder & Felder, 1865
- Euploea eleusina anitra Fruhstorfer, 1910
- Euploea eleusina palata Fruhstorfer, 1910
- Euploea eleusina mniszechii Felder, 1859
- Euploea eleusina aganor Fruhstorfer, 1910
- Euploea hewitsonii hewitsonii Felder & Felder, 1865
- Euploea hewitsonii reducta Jurriaanse, 1919
- Euploea hewitsonii mangolina Fruhstorfer, 1899
- Euploea hewitsonii besinensis Fruhstorfer, 1899
- Euploea algea kirbyi Felder & Felder, 1865
- Euploea algea horsfieldii Felder & Felder, 1865
- Euploea algea bevagna Fruhstorfer, 1911
- Euploea algea talautensis Piepers & Snellen, 1896
- Euploea algea maura Hopffer, 1874
- Euploea algea laodikeia Fruhstorfer, 1910
- Euploea algea tombugensis Fruhstorfer, 1899
- Euploea algea wiskotti Röber, 1887
- Euploea algea corvina Fruhstorfer, 1898
- Euploea core bauermanni Röber, 1885
- Euploea core kalaona Fruhstorfer, 1898
- Euploea latifasciata latifasciata Weymer, 1885
- Euploea latifasciata hashimotoi Detani, 1983
- Euploea redtenbacheri coracina Hopffer, 1874
- Euploea redtenbacheri redtenbacheri Felder & Felder, 1865
- Euploea redtenbacheri selayarensis Tsukada & Nishiyama, 1979
- Idea blanchardii blanchardii Marchal, 1845
- Idea blanchardii marosiana Fruhstorfer, 1903
- Idea blanchardii paluana Martin, 1914
- Idea blanchardii garunda Fruhstorfer, 1910
- Idea blanchardii munaensis Fruhstorfer, 1899
- Idea blanchardii phlegeton Fruhstorfer, 1904
- Idea blanchardii silayara Martin, 1914
- Idea blanchardii djampeana Fruhstorfer, 1899
- Idea blanchardii kuehni Röber, 1887
- Idea idea sula de Nicéville, 1900
- Idea tambusisiana tambusisiana Bedford Russell, 1981
- Idea tambusisiana hideoi Okano, 1985
- Idea leuconoe godmani Oberthür, 1879
- Idea leuconoe esanga Fruhstorfer, 1898

=== Heliconiinae ===
- Terinos taxiles abisares Felder & Felder, 1867
- Terinos taxiles poros Fruhstorfer, 1906
- Terinos taxiles banggaiensis Detani, 1983
- Terinos taxiles angurium Tsukada, 1985
- Terinos clarissa ludmilla Staudinger, 1889
- Vindula erota banta Eliot, 1956
- Vindula erota boetonensis Jurriaanse & Lindemans, 1920
- Vindula sulaensis Joicey & Talbot, 1924
- Vindula dejone celebensis Butler, 1883
- Vindula dejone susanoo Tsukada, 1985
- Vindula dejone kabiana Fruhstorfer, 1912
- Vindula dejone austrosundana Fruhstorfer, 1897
- Vindula dejone bushi Tsukada, 1985
- Vindula dejone satellitica Fruhstorfer, 1899
- Vindula dejone dioneia Fruhstorfer, 1912
- Cupha arias celebensis Fruhstorfer, 1899
- Cupha arias sangirica Fruhstorfer, 1912
- Cupha arias muna Fruhstorfer, 1897
- Cupha maeonides maeonides Hewitson, 1859
- Cupha maeonides butungensis Tsukada, 1985
- Cupha maeonides nigrico Tsukada, 1985
- Cupha maeonides maenada Grose Smith, 1898
- Cupha crameri kalaoensis Tsukada, 1985
- Algia fasciata lautus Tsukada, 1985
- Algia fasciata angustata Fruhstorfer, 1912
- Algia satyrina satyrina Felder & Felder, 1867
- Algia satyrina sibylla Röber, 1887
- Algia satyrina similliana Röber, 1887
- Cirrochroa thule Felder & Felder, 1860
- Cirrochroa semiramis Felder & Felder, 1867
- Cirrochroa eremita Tsukada, 1985
- Cirrochroa recondita Roos, 1996
- Vagrans sinha nupta Staudinger, 1889
- Phalanta alcippe celebensis Wallace, 1869
- Phalanta alcippe onyx Tsukada, 1985
- Phalanta alcippe aridus Tsukada, 1985
- Phalanta alcippe handjahi Tsukada, 1985
- Phalanta alcippe omarion Fruhstorfer, 1912
- Phalanta phalantha sabulum Tsukada, 1985
- Argynnis hyperbius centralis Martin, 1913
- Acraea andromacha indica Röber, 1885
- Acraea moluccana dohertyi Holland, 1891
- Acraea moluccana parce Staudinger, 1896
- Cethosia biblis sarsina Fruhstorfer, 1912
- Cethosia biblis picta Felder & Felder, 1866
- Cethosia biblis togiana Fruhstorfer, 1902
- Cethosia myrina myrina Felder & Felder, 1867
- Cethosia myrina melancholica Fruhstorfer, 1909
- Cethosia myrina sarnada Fruhstorfer, 1912
- Cethosia myrina vanbemmeleni Jurriaanse & Lindemans, 1918
- Cethosia myrina ribbei Honrath, 1886
- Cethosia tambora atia Fruhstorfer, 1905
- Cethosia cydippe sangira Fruhstorfer, 1906

== See also ==
- List of Indonesian endemic butterflies
