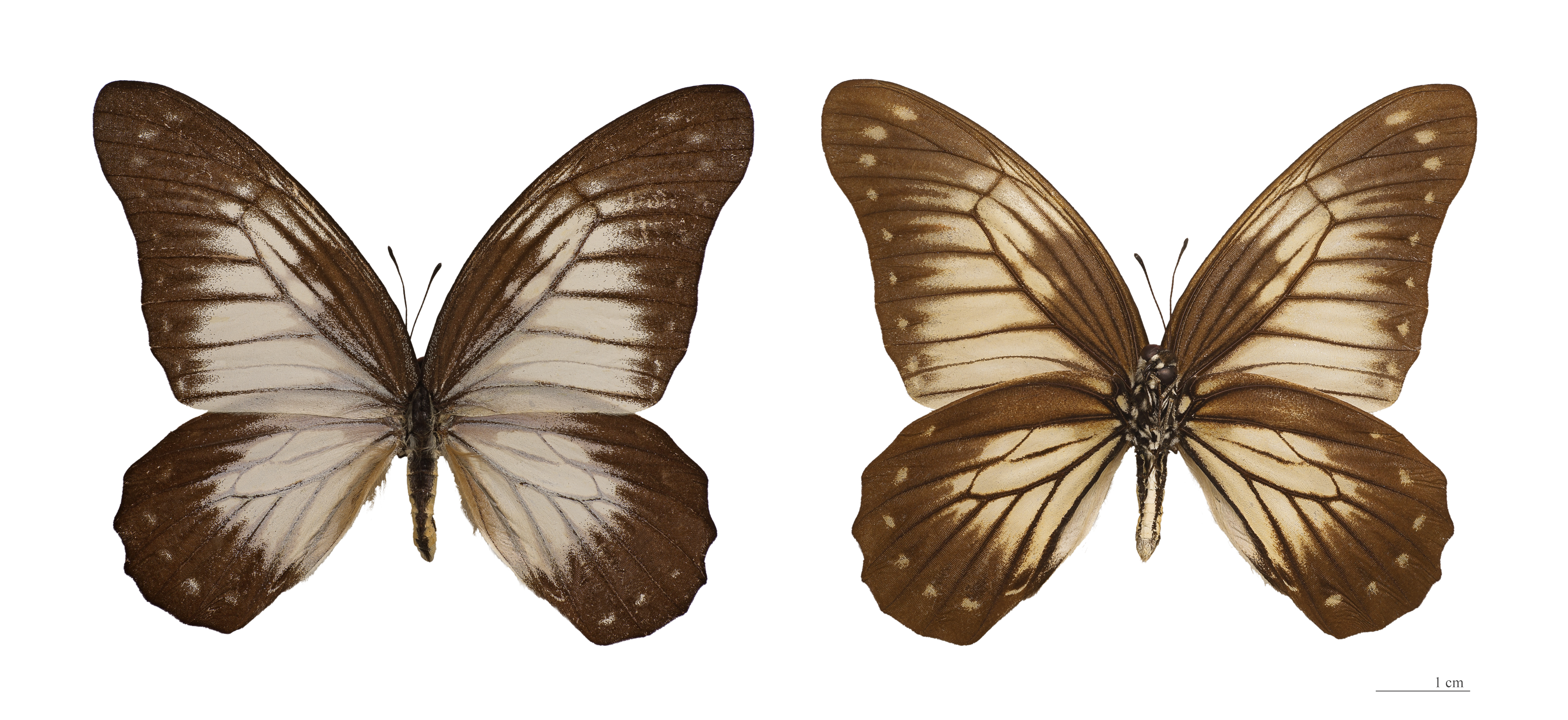
- Museum specimen (MHNT)

Scientific classification
- Kingdom: Animalia
- Phylum: Arthropoda
- Class: Insecta
- Order: Lepidoptera
- Family: Papilionidae
- Genus: Graphium
- Species: G. encelades

Binomial name
- Graphium encelades (Boisduval, 1836)

Synonyms
- Papilio encelades Boisduval, 1836

= Graphium encelades =

Species of butterfly

Graphium encelades is a species of butterfly in the family Papilionidae. It is endemic species found only in Sulawesi.

== Status ==
Not uncommon and said not to be threatened.

== See also ==
- List of butterflies of Sulawesi
