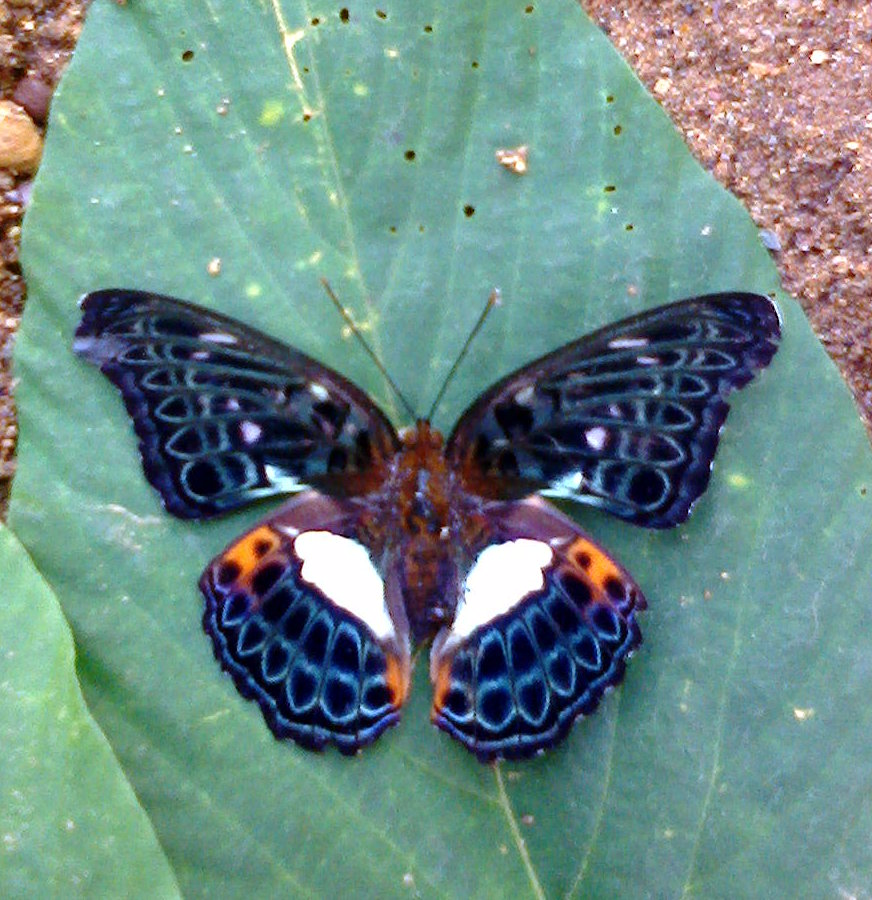
- From Sungai Pontolo, North Gorontalo, Indonesia

Scientific classification
- Kingdom: Animalia
- Phylum: Arthropoda
- Class: Insecta
- Order: Lepidoptera
- Family: Nymphalidae
- Genus: Moduza
- Species: M. lymire

Binomial name
- Moduza lymire (Hewitson, 1859)

= Moduza lymire =

Species of butterfly

Moduza lymire is butterfly endemic to Sulawesi, Indonesia, described by William Chapman Hewitson in 1859.
