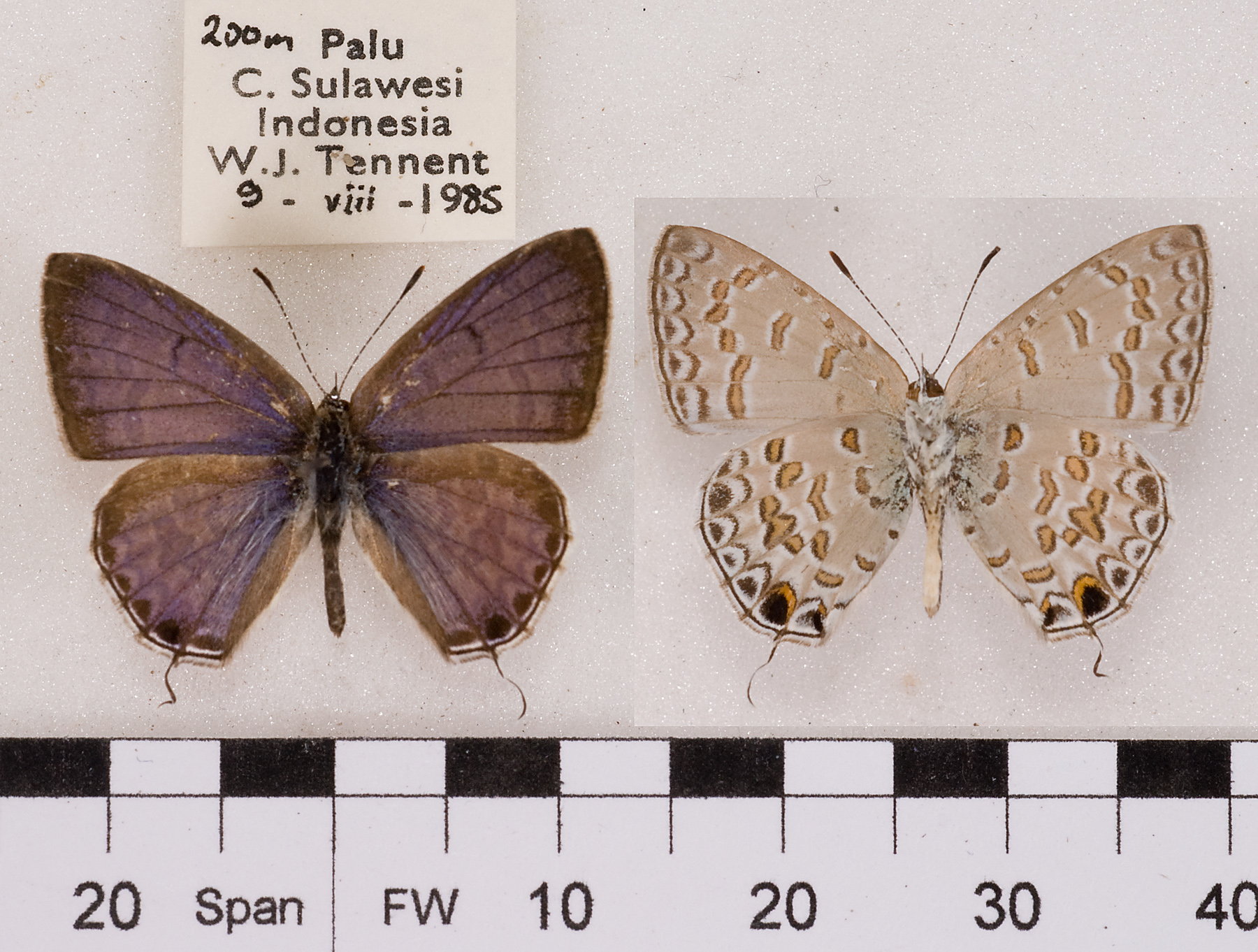
- Catopyrops rita bora

Scientific classification
- Kingdom: Animalia
- Phylum: Arthropoda
- Clade: Pancrustacea
- Class: Insecta
- Order: Lepidoptera
- Family: Lycaenidae
- Genus: Catopyrops
- Species: C. rita

Binomial name
- Catopyrops rita (Grose-Smith, 1895)

= Catopyrops rita =

Species of butterfly

Catopyrops rita is a species of butterfly belonging to the lycaenid family described by Henley Grose-Smith in 1895. It is found in the Australasian realm and in the Indomalayan realm, crossing the Wallace line.

== Subspecies ==
- C. r. rita Ambon, Timor
- C. r. bora Eliot, 1956 Sulawesi
- C. r. altijavana Toxopeus, 1930 Java
