= Weymer's crow =

Conservation status
- Least Concern (IUCN 2.3)

Scientific classification
- Kingdom: Animalia
- Phylum: Arthropoda
- Clade: Pancrustacea
- Class: Insecta
- Order: Lepidoptera
- Family: Nymphalidae
- Genus: Euploea
- Species: E. latifasciata

Binomial name
- Euploea latifasciata Weymer, 1885

Species of butterfly

Weymer's crow (Euploea latifasciata) is a species of nymphalid butterfly. It is endemic to Indonesia.

== Subspecies ==
- Euploea latifasciata latifasciata Vane-Wright & de Jong, 2003 Sulawesi
- E. l. radica Fruhstorfer, 1904 Obi, Bachan
- ''E. l. hashimotoi Banggai
