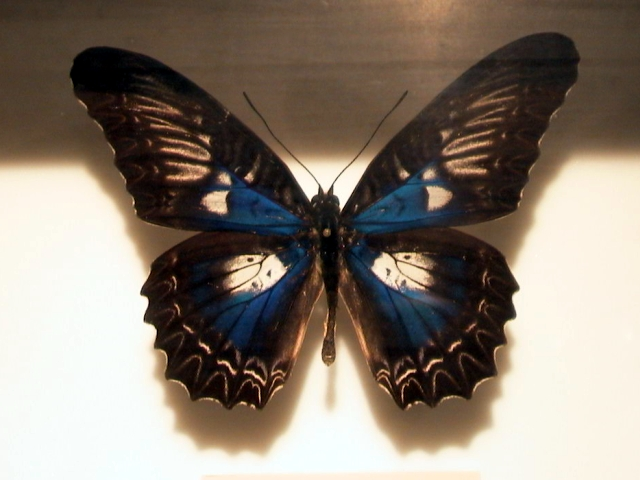

Scientific classification
- Domain: Eukaryota
- Kingdom: Animalia
- Phylum: Arthropoda
- Class: Insecta
- Order: Lepidoptera
- Family: Nymphalidae
- Genus: Cethosia
- Species: C. myrina

Binomial name
- Cethosia myrina C. & R. Felder, [1867]

= Cethosia myrina =

Violet lacewing

Species of butterfly

Cethosia myrina, the violet lacewing or brown accented butterfly, is a butterfly of the family Nymphalidae. It is found on the Indonesian islands of Sulawesi and Butung.

The wingspan is about 75 mm.

== Subspecies ==
- Cethosia myrina myrina (northern Sulawesi)
- Cethosia myrina ribbei Honrath, 1887 (Banggai)
- Cethosia myrina sarnada Fruhstorfer, 1912 (southern Sulawesi)
- Cethosia myrina melancholia Fruhstorfer, 1912 (eastern Sulawesi)
- Cethosia myrina vanbemmeleni Jurriansz, 1920 (Butung Island)
