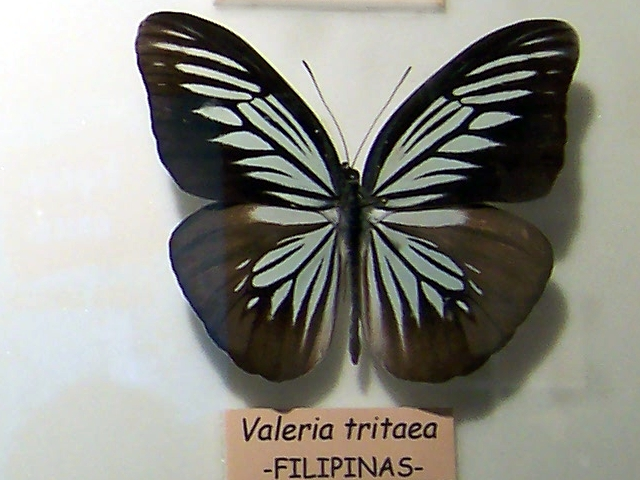

Scientific classification
- Kingdom: Animalia
- Phylum: Arthropoda
- Class: Insecta
- Order: Lepidoptera
- Family: Pieridae
- Genus: Pareronia
- Species: P. tritaea

Binomial name
- Pareronia tritaea (C. & R. Felder, 1859)

Synonyms
- Eronia tritaea C. & R. Felder, 1859; Valeria tritaea; Nepheronia octaviae Snellen, 1894

= Pareronia tritaea =

Species of butterfly

Pareronia tritaea is a butterfly of the family Pieridae. It is found in Indonesia (including Sulawesi) and the Philippines.

== Subspecies ==
- P. t. tritaea (northern and central Sulawesi)
- P. t. bargylia (southern Sulawesi)
- P. t. hermocinia (Banggai Island)
- P. t. bilinearis (Selajar)
- P. t. octaviae (Tanahdjampea, Kalao)
- P. t. illustris (Wangiwangi Island)
