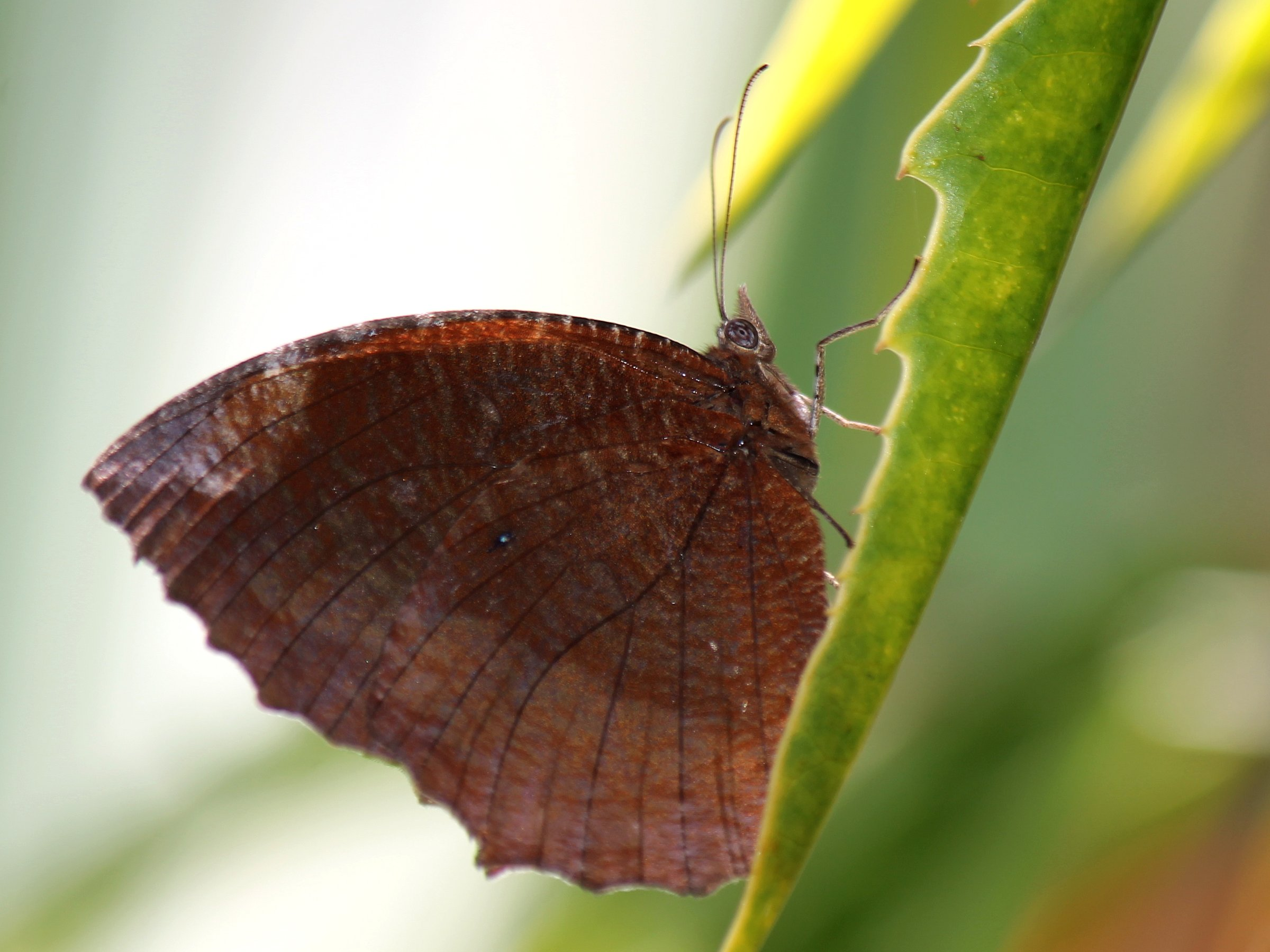

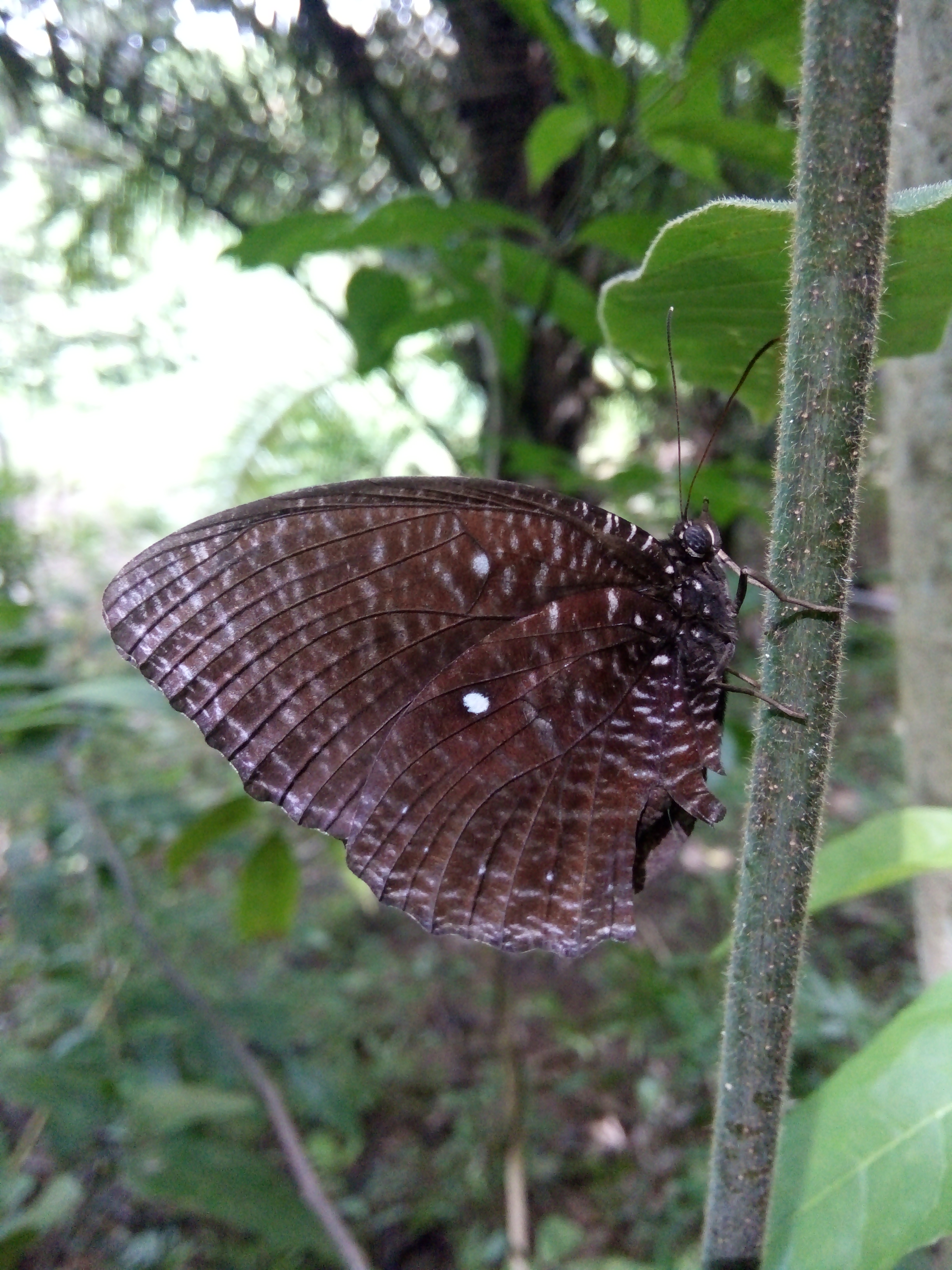
- from Sungai Pontolo, North Gorontalo, Sulawesi

Scientific classification
- Kingdom: Animalia
- Phylum: Arthropoda
- Clade: Pancrustacea
- Class: Insecta
- Order: Lepidoptera
- Family: Nymphalidae
- Genus: Elymnias
- Species: E. cumaea

Binomial name
- Elymnias cumaea C. & R. Felder, [1867]

Synonyms
- Elymnias thyone Fruhstorfer, 1904; Elymnias bornemanni Ribbe, 1889

= Elymnias cumaea =

Species of butterfly

Elymnias cumaea is a butterfly in the family Nymphalidae. It was described by Cajetan Felder and Rudolf Felder in 1867. It is endemic to Sulawesi in the Australasian realm.

== Subspecies ==
- E. c. cumaea (North Sulawesi: Minahassa)
- E. c. toliana Fruhstorfer, 1899 (North Sulawesi: Toli Toli)
- E. c. bornemanni Ribbe, 1889 (Banggai Island)
- E. c. phrikonis Fruhstorfer, 1899 (Sula Mangoli)
- E. c. relicina Fruhstorfer, 1907 (Sula Besi)
- E. c. resplendens Martin, 1929 (Sulawesi)
