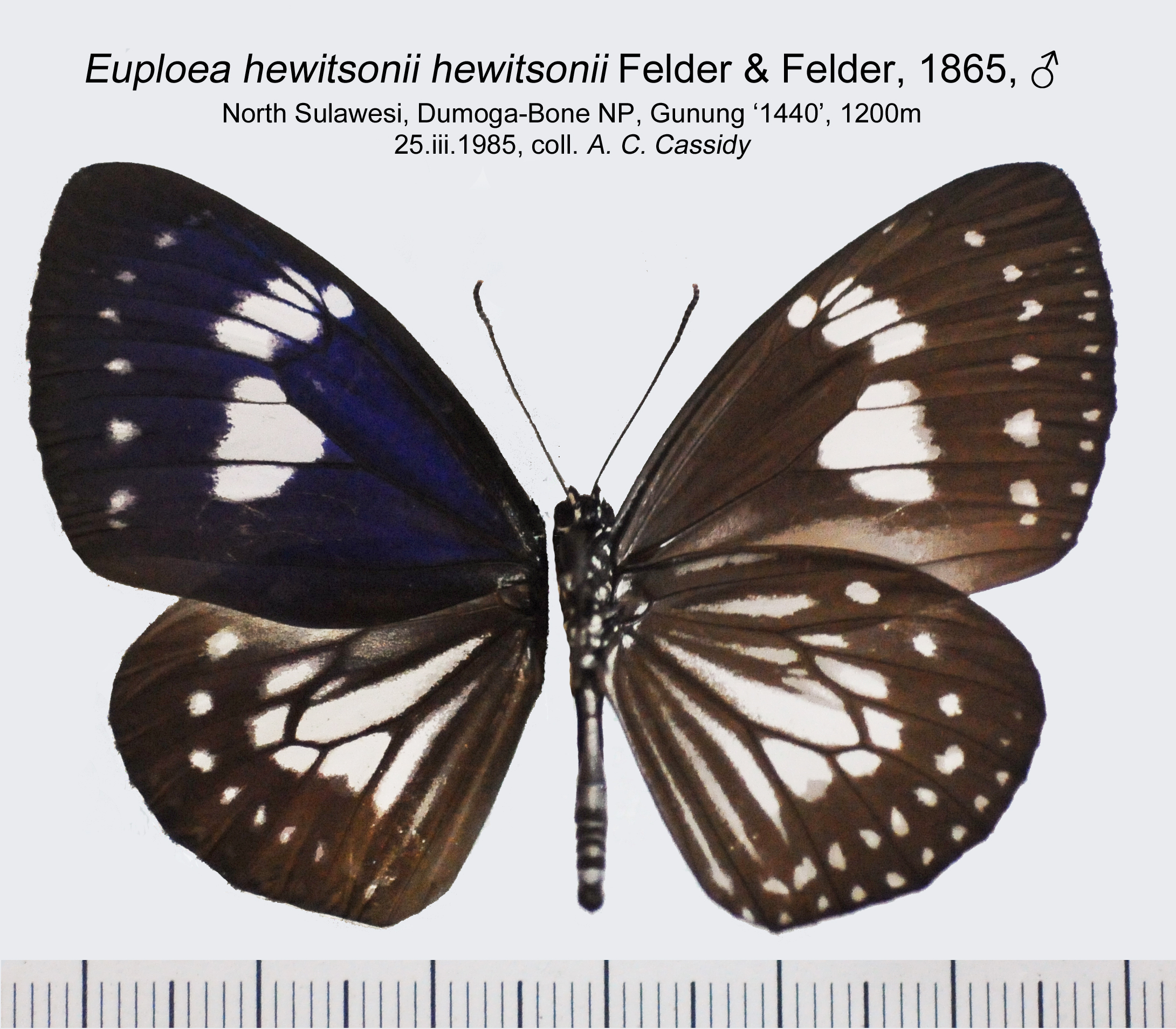
- Euploea hewitsonii hewitsonii

Scientific classification
- Kingdom: Animalia
- Phylum: Arthropoda
- Clade: Pancrustacea
- Class: Insecta
- Order: Lepidoptera
- Family: Nymphalidae
- Genus: Euploea
- Species: E. hewitsonii

Binomial name
- Euploea hewitsonii Felder C. & Felder R., 1865

Synonyms
- Euploea hyacinthus Butler, 1866; Euploea subcongrua Röber, 1897; Calliploea hyacinthus mangolina Fruhstorfer, 1899; Calliploea besinensis Fruhstorfer, 1899

= Euploea hewitsonii =

Species of butterfly

Euploea hewitsonii, or Hewitson's dwarf crow, is a butterfly in the family Nymphalidae. It was described by Cajetan Felder and Rudolf Felder in 1865. It is found in the Australasian realm.

== Subspecies ==
- E. h. hewitsonii (Sulawesi, Banggai)
- E. h. mangolina (Fruhstorfer, 1899) (Sula Mangoli)
- E. h. besinensis (Fruhstorfer, 1899) (Sula Besi)
- E. h. reducta Jurriaanse, 1920 (Buton, Kabaena, Muna)
