= Nirvanopsis =

Scientific classification
- Domain: Eukaryota
- Kingdom: Animalia
- Phylum: Arthropoda
- Class: Insecta
- Order: Lepidoptera
- Family: Nymphalidae
- Tribe: Elymniini
- Genus: Nirvanopsis; Vane-Wright, 2003
- Species: N. hypnus

Binomial name
- Nirvanopsis hypnus (Tsukada & Nishiyama, 1979)

Synonyms
- Genus-level: Nirvana Tsukada & Nishiyama, 1979 (non Kirkaldy, 1900): preoccupied; Species-level: Nirvana hypnus Tsukada & Nishiyama, 1979

Genus of butterflies

Nirvanopsis is a butterfly genus from the subfamily Satyrinae in the family Nymphalidae. The only species in the genus, Nirvanopsis hypnus, occurs in Indonesia.
