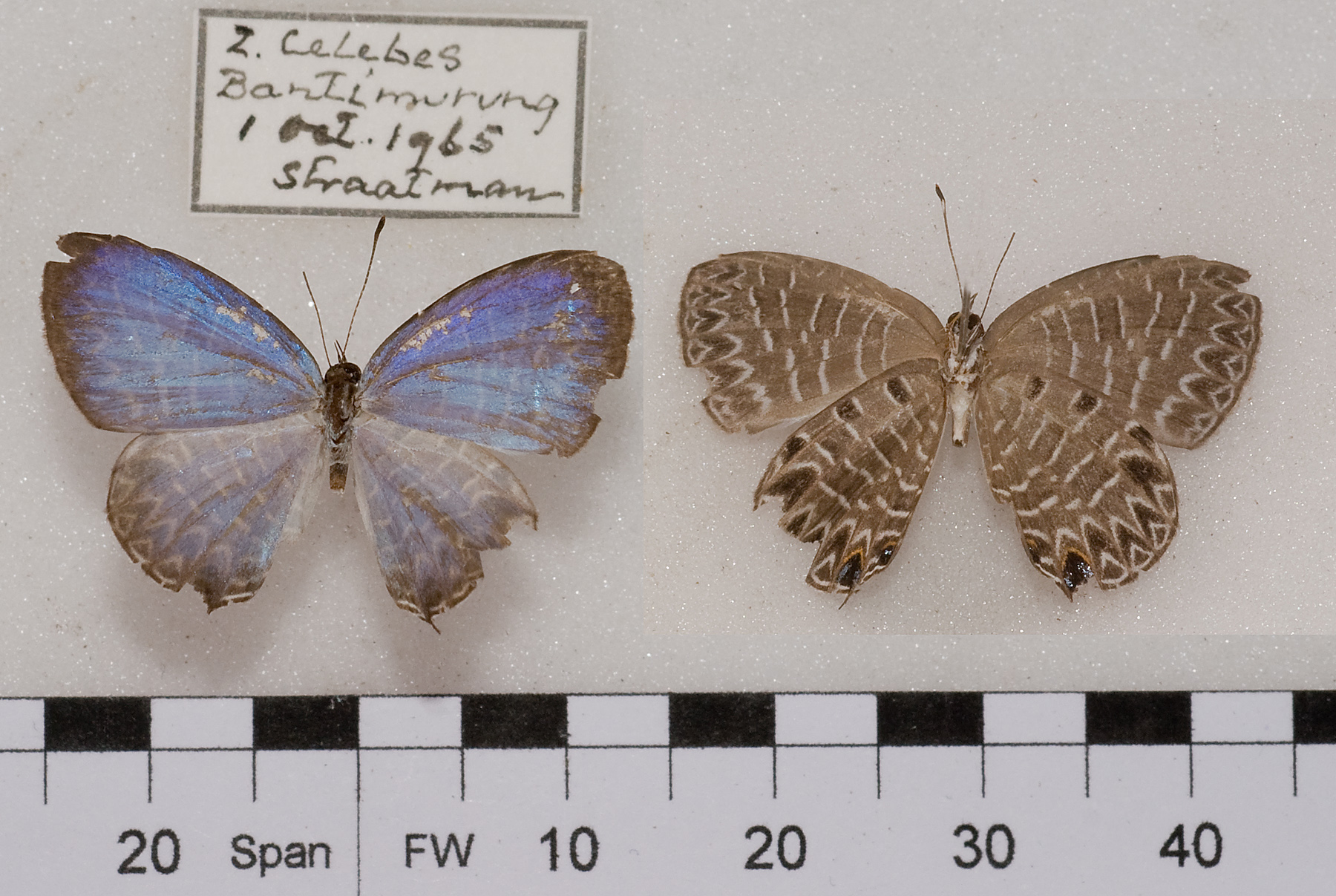

Scientific classification
- Domain: Eukaryota
- Kingdom: Animalia
- Phylum: Arthropoda
- Class: Insecta
- Order: Lepidoptera
- Family: Lycaenidae
- Genus: Jamides
- Species: J. festivus

Binomial name
- Jamides festivus (Röber, 1886)

= Jamides festivus =

Species of butterfly

Jamides festivus is a butterfly in the family Lycaenidae.
