= Allotinus macassarensis =

- in Seitz Macrolepidoptera IndoAustralica Fauna (h)

Scientific classification
- Kingdom: Animalia
- Phylum: Arthropoda
- Clade: Pancrustacea
- Class: Insecta
- Order: Lepidoptera
- Family: Lycaenidae
- Genus: Allotinus
- Species: A. macassarensis

Binomial name
- Allotinus macassarensis (Holland, 1891)

Synonyms
- Paragerydus macassarensis Holland, 1891; Allotinus horsfieldi macassariensis (Holland) Fruhstorfer, 1913; Allotinus unicolor damodar Fruhstorfer, 1913; Allotinus macassariensis (Holland); Corbet, 1939; Allotinus macassariensis macassariensis (Holland); Eliot, 1967; Allotinus macassariensis menadensis Eliot, 1967

Species of butterfly

Allotinus macassarensis is a butterfly in the family Lycaenidae. It was described by William Jacob Holland in 1891. It is endemic to Sulawesi. Fruhstorfer in Seitz ( page 812 plate (141 h ) provides a description differentiating macassarensis from nearby taxa.

== Subspecies ==
- Allotinus macassarensis macassarensis (southern Sulawesi, Banggai Island)
- Allotinus macassarensis menadensis Eliot, 1967 (northern Sulawesi, Bangka Island)
