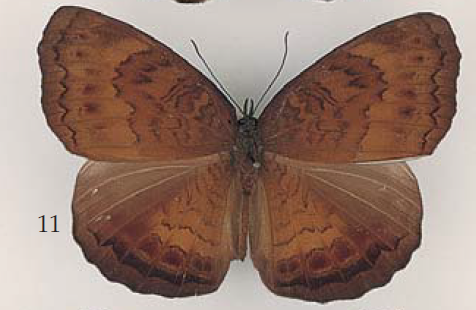

Scientific classification
- Kingdom: Animalia
- Phylum: Arthropoda
- Clade: Pancrustacea
- Class: Insecta
- Order: Lepidoptera
- Family: Nymphalidae
- Genus: Ariadne
- Species: A. merionoides

Binomial name
- Ariadne merionoides (Holland, 1891)

Synonyms
- Ergolis merionoides Holland, 1891

= Ariadne merionoides =

Species of butterfly

Ariadne merionoides, the Holland's castor, is a butterfly in the family Nymphalidae. It is found in Sulawesi.

The species was described from four male specimens and two female specimens by William Jacob Holland. It is one of the largest species in the genus. Wingspan is recorded at 73mm in males, and 80mm in females.

== Subspecies ==
- Ariadne merionoides merionoides
- Ariadne merionoides sulaensis (Joicey & Talbot, 1922)
- Ariadne merionoides pecten Tsukada, 1985
