= Cepora celebensis =

- in Seitz FaunaIndoAustralica Plate64d

Scientific classification
- Kingdom: Animalia
- Phylum: Arthropoda
- Clade: Pancrustacea
- Class: Insecta
- Order: Lepidoptera
- Family: Pieridae
- Genus: Cepora
- Species: C. celebensis

Binomial name
- Cepora celebensis (Rothschild, 1892)

Synonyms
- Huphina celebensis Rothschild, 1892

Species of butterfly

Cepora celebensis is a butterfly in the family Pieridae. It is found on Sulawesi.

== Subspecies ==
The following subspecies are recognised:

- Cepora celebensis celebensis
- Cepora celebensis kazuyoe Watanabe, 1987 (south-eastern Sulawesi)
