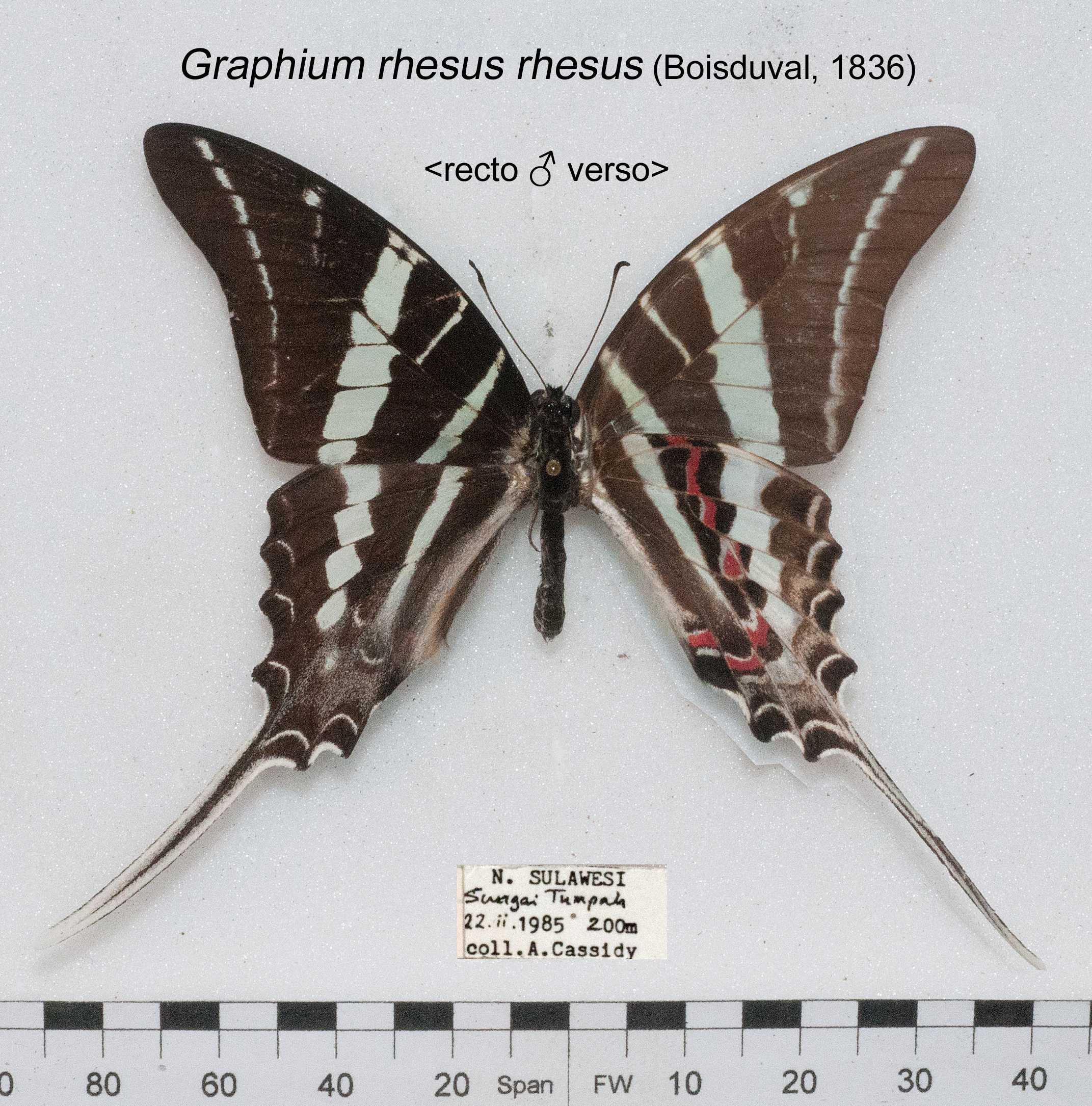
- Museum specimen from Sulawesi

Scientific classification
- Kingdom: Animalia
- Phylum: Arthropoda
- Clade: Pancrustacea
- Class: Insecta
- Order: Lepidoptera
- Family: Papilionidae
- Genus: Graphium
- Species: G. rhesus

Binomial name
- Graphium rhesus (Boisduval, 1836)

Synonyms
- Papilio rhesus Boisduval, 1836; Pathysa rhesus rhesus; Papilio rhesus parvimacula Joicey & Talbot, 1922

= Graphium rhesus =

Species of butterfly

Graphium rhesus is a butterfly found in the Sunda Islands of the Malay Archipelago that belongs to the swallowtail family.

== Subspecies ==
- G. r. rhesus (northern and eastern Sulawesi)
- G. r. rhesulus Fruhstorfer, 1902 (southern Sulawesi, Banggai)
- G. r. rhaphia Jordan, 1908 (Tanahdjampea, Tukangbesi Islands)
- G. r. parvimacula (Joicey & Talbot, 1922) (Sula Islands)
