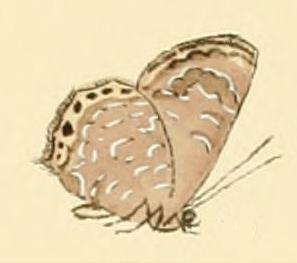

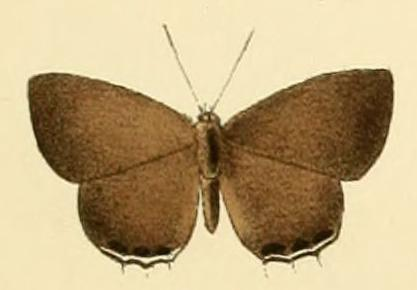

Scientific classification
- Kingdom: Animalia
- Phylum: Arthropoda
- Class: Insecta
- Order: Lepidoptera
- Family: Lycaenidae
- Genus: Anthene
- Species: A. philo

Binomial name
- Anthene philo (Hopffer, 1874)

Synonyms
- Lycaena philo Hopffer, 1874; Lycaenesthes leocrates Hewitson, 1878; Lycaenesthes philo f. praeclara Fruhstorfer, 1923

= Anthene philo =

Species of butterfly

Anthene philo is a butterfly in the family Lycaenidae. It is found in South-east Asia.

== Subspecies ==
- Anthene philo philo (Sulawesi, Salayar, Tukangbesi, Banggai, Sula)
- Anthene philo scintillans Tite, 1966 (Talaud, Sanghie)
