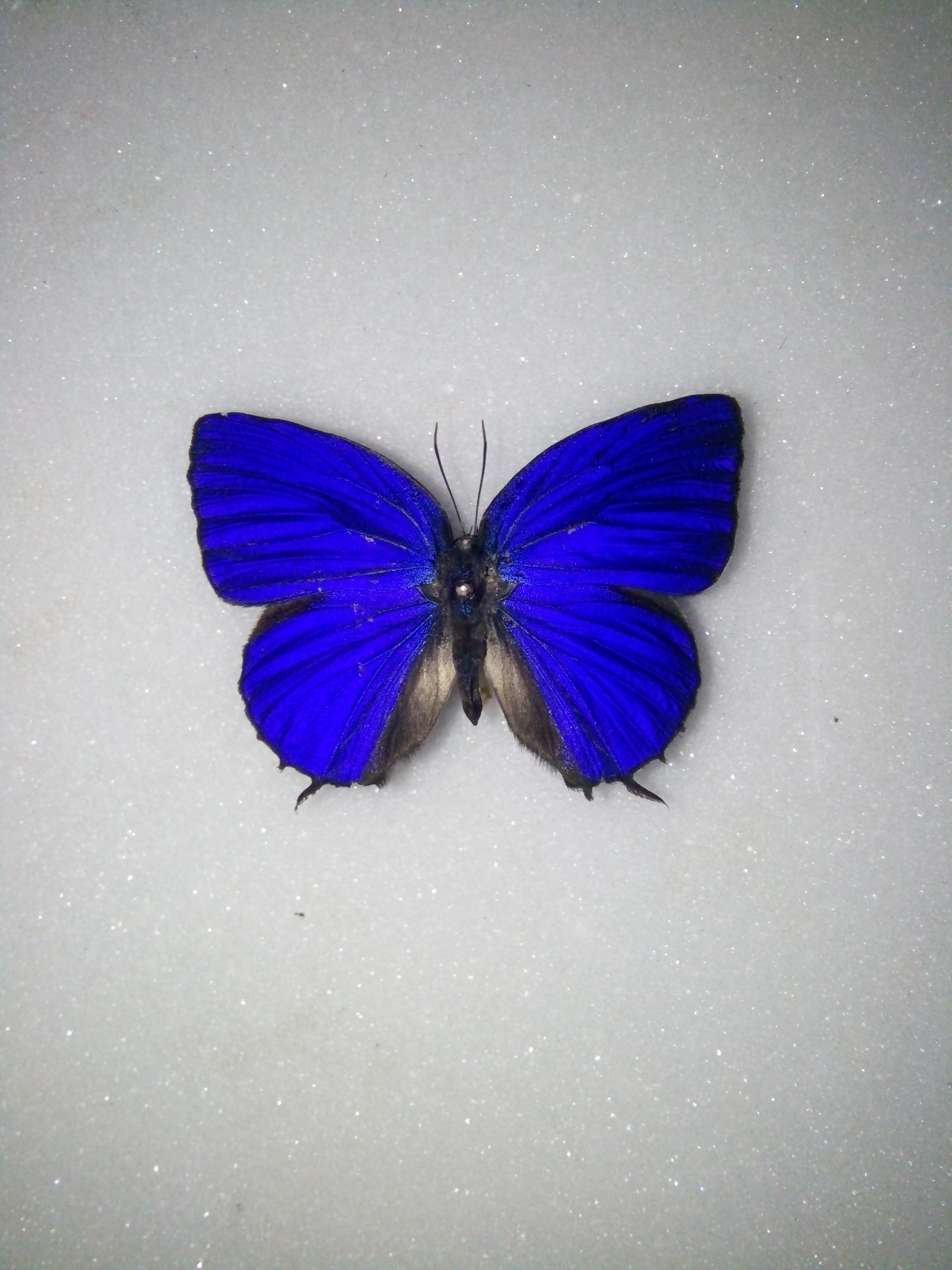
- From Pontolo, North Gorontalo, Sulawesi
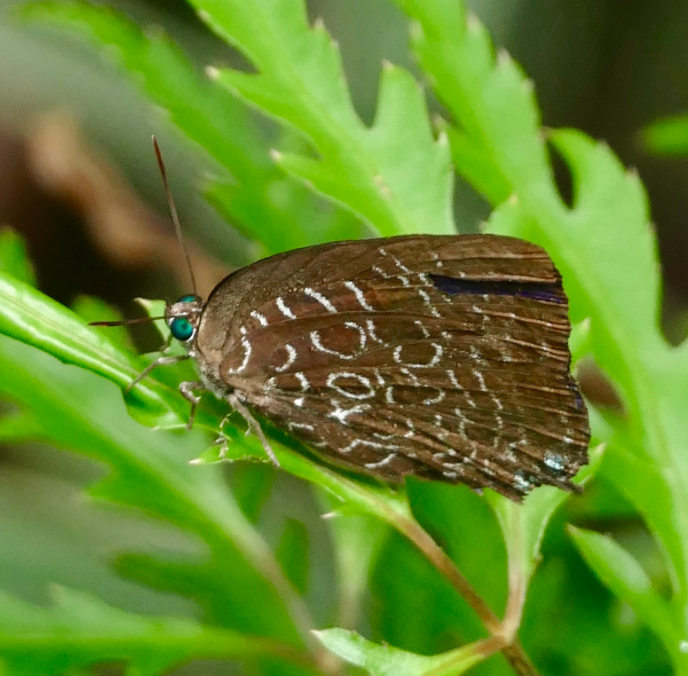

Scientific classification
- Kingdom: Animalia
- Phylum: Arthropoda
- Clade: Pancrustacea
- Class: Insecta
- Order: Lepidoptera
- Family: Lycaenidae
- Genus: Arhopala
- Species: A. acetes

Binomial name
- Arhopala acetes (Hewitson, 1862)

Synonyms
- Amblypodia acetes Hewitson, 1862

= Arhopala acetes =

Species of butterfly

Arhopala acetes is a butterfly endemic to Sulawesi described by William Chapman Hewitson in 1862.

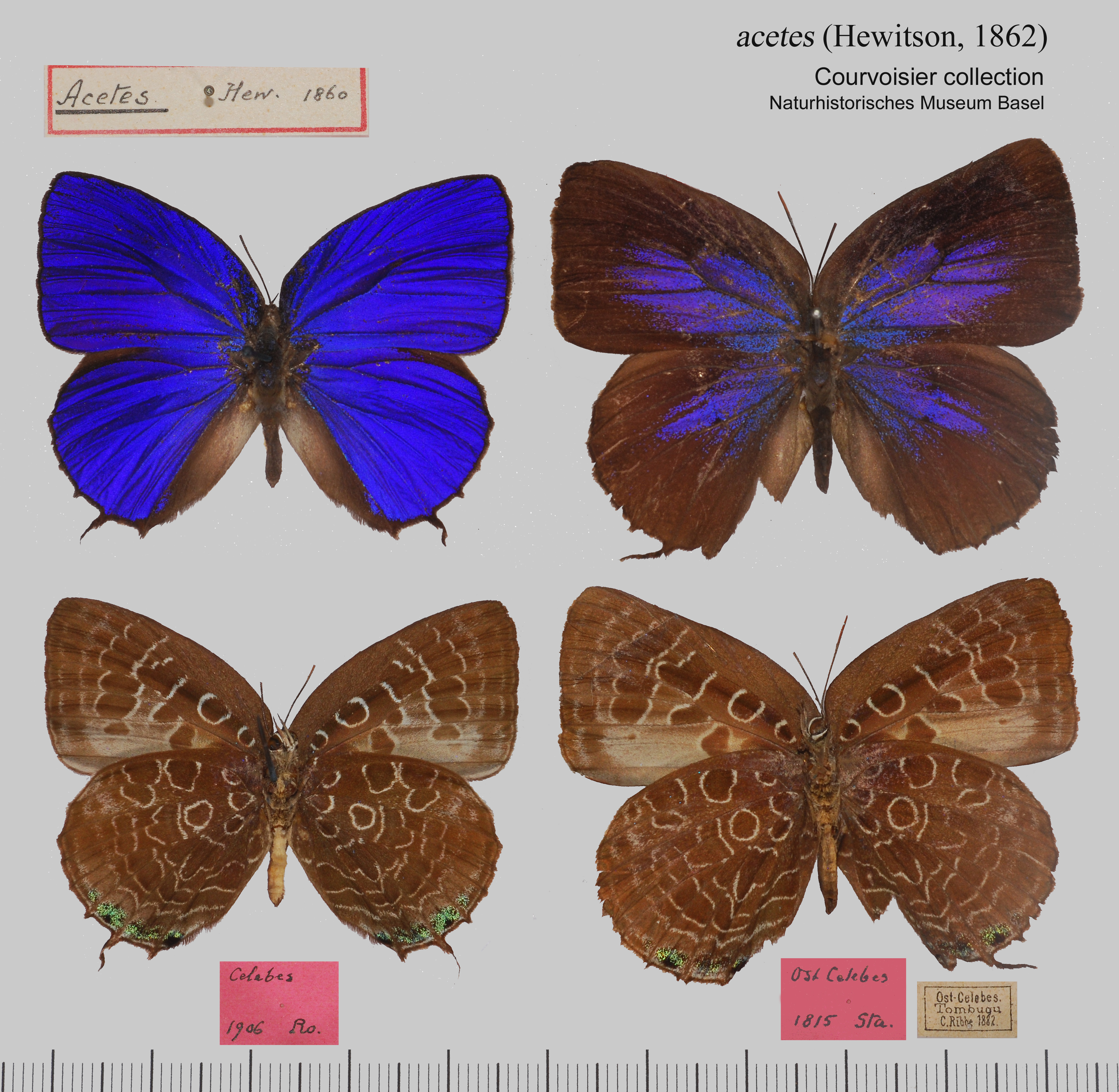
Male and female

== Description ==
Like Arhopala araxes a Celebes-form, from Macassar; size of araxes or still larger, but the upper surface of the is uniformly blue; beneath the markings are also in the forewing intensely surrounded with yellowish-white.
