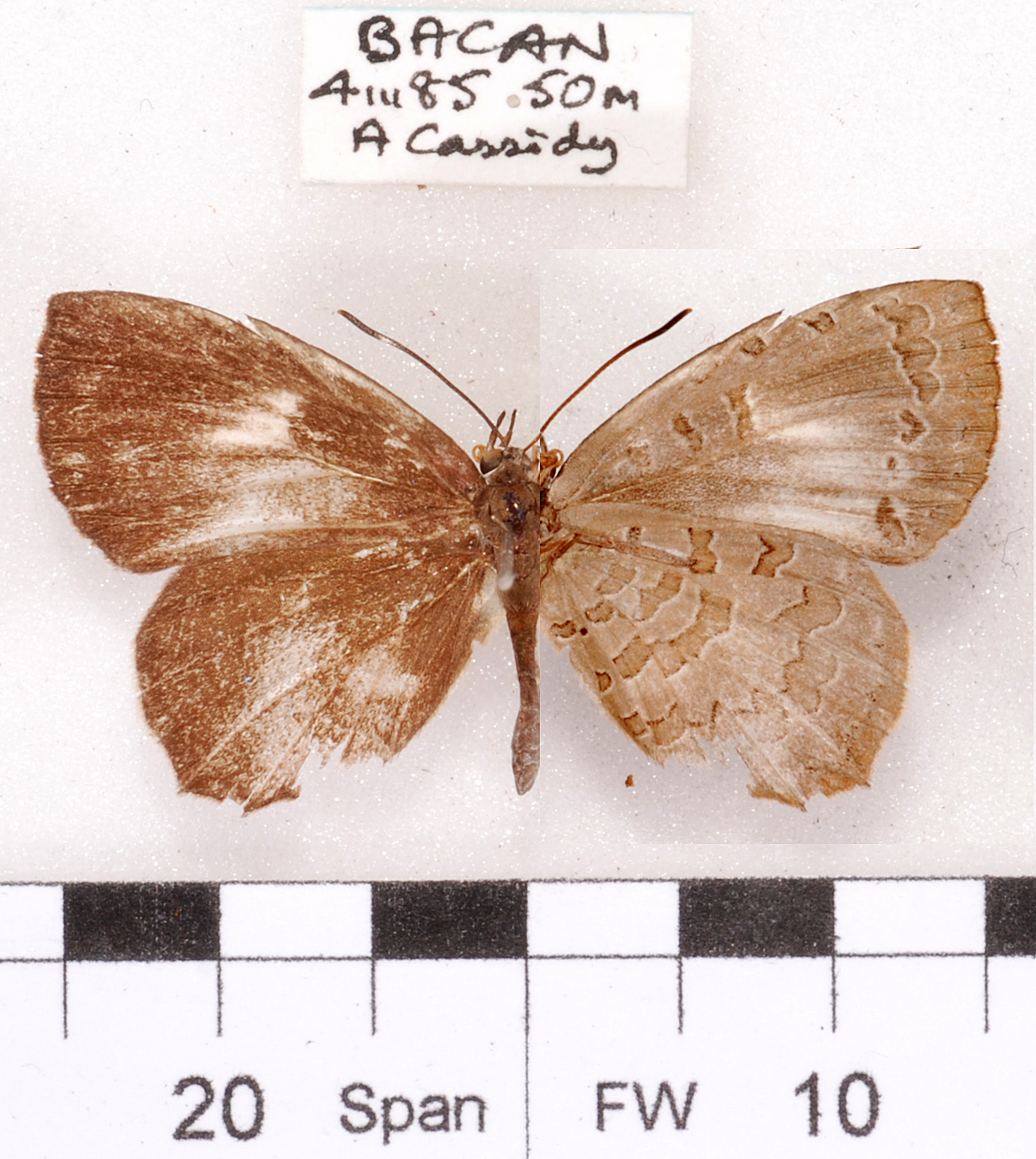

Scientific classification
- Kingdom: Animalia
- Phylum: Arthropoda
- Class: Insecta
- Order: Lepidoptera
- Family: Lycaenidae
- Genus: Miletus
- Species: M. boisduvali

Binomial name
- Miletus boisduvali (Butler, 1884)

Synonyms
- Gerydus boisduvali Moore, 1857; Gerydus vincula H. H. Druce, 1895; Gerydus buruensis Holland, 1900; Miletus chinensis var. ceramensis Ribbe, 1889; Gerydus stygianus Butler, 1884; Gerydus boisduvali avitus Fruhstorfer, 1916; Gerydus boisduvali heraeon Fruhstorfer, 1916; Gerydus courvoisieri courvoisieri Fruhstorfer, 1916; Gerydus boisduvali oxylus Fruhstorfer, 1916; Gerydus boisduvali lombokianus Fruhstorfer, 1913; Gerydus boisduvali var. acragas Doherty, 1892; Gerydus boisduvali dossemus Fruhstorfer, 1913; Gerydus boisduvali adeua Fruhstorfer, 1913; Gerydus boisduvali diotrophes Fruhstorfer, 1913

= Miletus boisduvali =

Species of butterfly

Miletus boisduvali, the common brownie, is a small but striking butterfly found in India and Myanmar that belongs to the lycaenids or blues family.

== Range ==
It ranges from Sikkim to Assam in India to Myanmar.

== Status ==
The species is not considered rare.

== Description ==
A small butterfly, 32 to 38 mm in wingspan. The upper forewing in both sexes has an obscure narrow curved white discal band, the lower spots composing it are well separated. In males, this band may be reduced to a small whitish patch at base 4. In females there will always be a dark streak present in the cell while the band may coalesce and extend to base. The body of the male is elongated and slender and protrudes beyond the wing. The underside is white with fine brown striation.

=== Description based on Bingham ===
Male upperside: brown; apical half of forewing very dark. Forewing with a short, curved, discal white fascia, sometimes obsolescent and vary variable in length. In some specimens it extends from just beyond the cell to vein 3, with or without an elongate white spot in continuation of it in interspace 2 and another in interspace 1; in other individuals it is longer and reaches vein 2, with or without a single elongate while spot in interspace 1. Hindwing: uniform, immaculate. Underside: slightly shiny, silken brown, deepening to purplish brown towards the termen and on hindwing. Forewing: a pale whitish, irregular, somewhat diffuse discal patch; cell crossed by six very slender obscure sinuate white lines, that give the cell the appearance of being crossed by three short brown bands; an irregular postdiscal sinuate transverse series of brown lunules of a shade slightly darker than the ground colour, those on the anterior portion of the wing are very slender and thread-like, those posteriorly broad and formed into somewhat annular transverse spots, the lower spots cross the discal whitish area; a subterminal series of black dots continued along the apical half of the costa. Hindwing: crossed by more or less obscure, catenulated, dark brown, interrupted bands that are margined on the inner and outer sides by snort, thread-like, darker, sinuate lines; a short, maculate, dark purple, transverse band from the middle of the dorsum to vein 4; and a subterminal series of minute black dots that is continued both subcostally and subdorsally to the base of the wing.

Female similar to the male but the colour and markings both on the upper and under sides duller. On the upperside of the forewing the white fascia is generally but not always broader. On the underside the purplish-brown gloss on the hindwing is restricted to a small area near the middle of the termen, the rest of the ground colour of the wing is dull brown. The catenulated transverse bands on both forewings and hindwings are however, more distinct. Antennae, head, thorax and abdomen above and beneath in both sexes uniform dark brown.

== Habits ==
Flies in forested country at lower elevations. Members of this genus are known to be carnivorous. Some species in other parts of the world are recorded as feeding on greenflies.

== Subspecies ==
- Miletus boisduvali boisduvali (Sundaland, Java, Sumatra, Borneo, Moluccas, New Guinea)
- Miletus boisduvali avitus (Fruhstorfer, 1916) (Kai Island)
- Miletus boisduvali diotrophes (Fruhstorfer, 1913) (eastern Sulawesi)

== See also ==
- List of butterflies of India
- List of butterflies of India (Lycaenidae)
