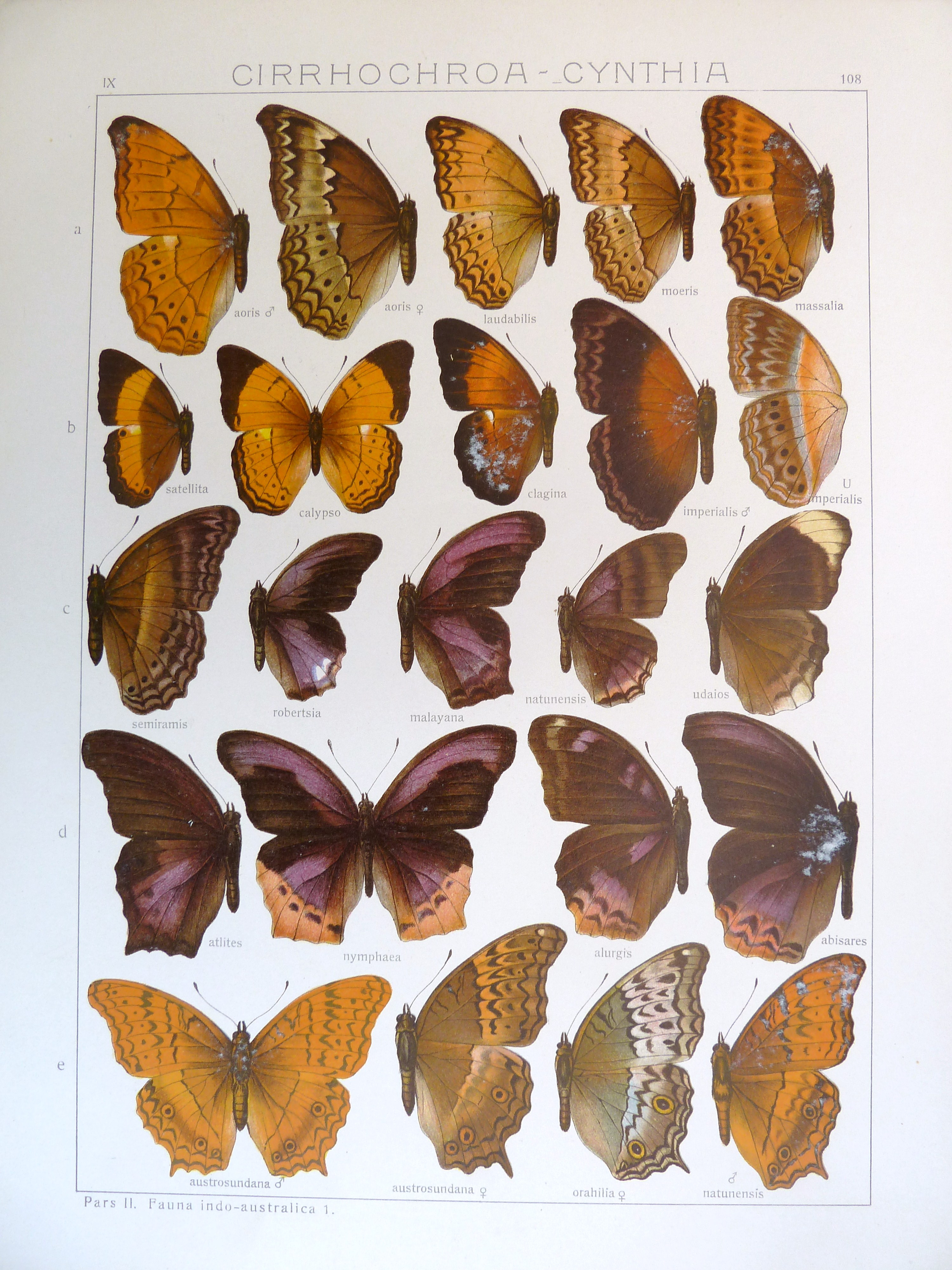
- Terinos taxiles abisares in Adalbert Seitz's Die Großschmetterlinge der Erde

Scientific classification
- Domain: Eukaryota
- Kingdom: Animalia
- Phylum: Arthropoda
- Class: Insecta
- Order: Lepidoptera
- Family: Nymphalidae
- Genus: Terinos
- Species: T. taxiles

Binomial name
- Terinos taxiles (Hewitson, 1862)

Synonyms
- Terinos abisares C. & R. Felder, [1867]

= Terinos taxiles =

Species of butterfly

Terinos taxiles is a butterfly in the family Nymphalidae. It was described by William Chapman Hewitson in 1862. It is found in the Australasian realm.

== Subspecies ==
- T. t. taxiles (Celebes, Bachan)
- T. t. abisares C. & R. Felder, [1867] (Celebes)
- T. t. poros Fruhstorfer, 1906 (South Sulawesi)
- T. t. helleri Fruhstorfer, 1906 (Waigeu)
- T. t. amplior Fruhstorfer, 1906 (Halmahera)
- T. t. banggaiensis Detani, 1983 (Banggai)
- T. t. angurium Tsukada, 1985 (Sula: Sanana)

== Biology ==
The larva on feeds on Rinorea.
