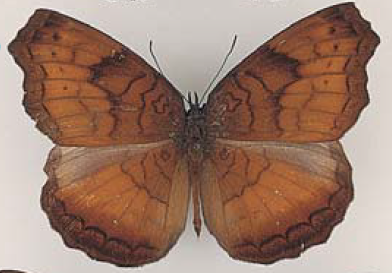

Scientific classification
- Kingdom: Animalia
- Phylum: Arthropoda
- Clade: Pancrustacea
- Class: Insecta
- Order: Lepidoptera
- Family: Nymphalidae
- Genus: Ariadne
- Species: A. celebensis

Binomial name
- Ariadne celebensis (Holland, 1898)

Synonyms
- Ergolis celebensis Holland, 1898

= Ariadne celebensis =

Species of butterfly

Ariadne celebensis, the Celebes castor, is a butterfly in the family Nymphalidae. It is found in Sulawesi.

The species was described from three male specimens and two female specimens by William Jacob Holland. It is one of the largest species in the genus.

== Subspecies ==
- Ariadne celebensis celebensis
- Ariadne celebensis dongalae (Fruhstorfer, 1903)
