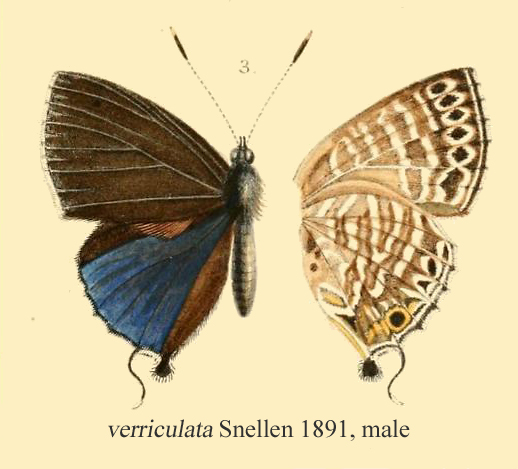

Scientific classification
- Kingdom: Animalia
- Phylum: Arthropoda
- Class: Insecta
- Order: Lepidoptera
- Family: Lycaenidae
- Genus: Sinthusa
- Species: S. verriculata

Binomial name
- Sinthusa verriculata (Snellen, 1891)

= Sinthusa verriculata =

Species of butterfly

Sinthusa verriculata, is a lycaenid butterfly found in Sulawesi. It was first described in 1891 by Pieter Cornelius Tobias Snellen.

== Gallery ==
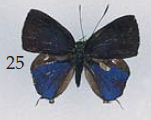
Upperside, syntype male, from southern Sulawesi

== See also ==
- Theclinae
