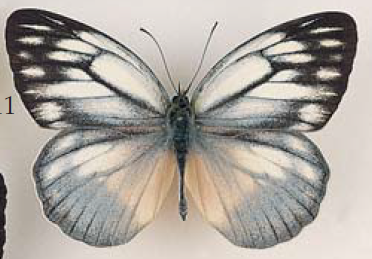

Scientific classification
- Kingdom: Animalia
- Phylum: Arthropoda
- Class: Insecta
- Order: Lepidoptera
- Family: Pieridae
- Genus: Cepora
- Species: C. timnatha

Binomial name
- Cepora timnatha (Hewitson, 1862)

Synonyms
- Pieris timnatha Hewitson, 1862

= Cepora timnatha =

Species of butterfly

Cepora timnatha is a butterfly in the family Pieridae. It is found in Indonesia.

== Subspecies ==
The following subspecies are recognised:

- Cepora timnatha timnatha (northern Sulawesi)
- Cepora timnatha sorror Fruhstorfer, 1899 (Sula Islands)
- Cepora timnatha filia Fruhstorfer, 1902 (southern Sulawesi)
- Cepora timnatha filiola Fruhstorfer, 1899 (Sula Besi)
- Cepora timnatha aurulenta Fruhstorfer, 1899 (Bangkai)
- Cepora timnatha butona Iwasaki & Yata, 2005 (Buton Island)
