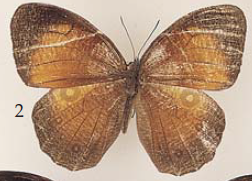
- Bletogona inexspectata (female), Sulawesi

Scientific classification
- Domain: Eukaryota
- Kingdom: Animalia
- Phylum: Arthropoda
- Class: Insecta
- Order: Lepidoptera
- Family: Nymphalidae
- Subfamily: Satyrinae
- Tribe: Melanitini
- Genus: Bletogona; Felder & Felder, 1867

= Bletogona =

Genus of butterfly

Bletogona is a butterfly genus from the subfamily Satyrinae in the family Nymphalidae. The genus was erected by Cajetan Felder and his son Rudolf Felder in 1867. This genus is endemic] to Sulawesi.

== Species ==
The most recent listing places Bletogona in tribe Melanitini with two species:

- Bletogona inexspectata Uémura, 1987
- Bletogona mycalesis Felder & Felder, 1867
