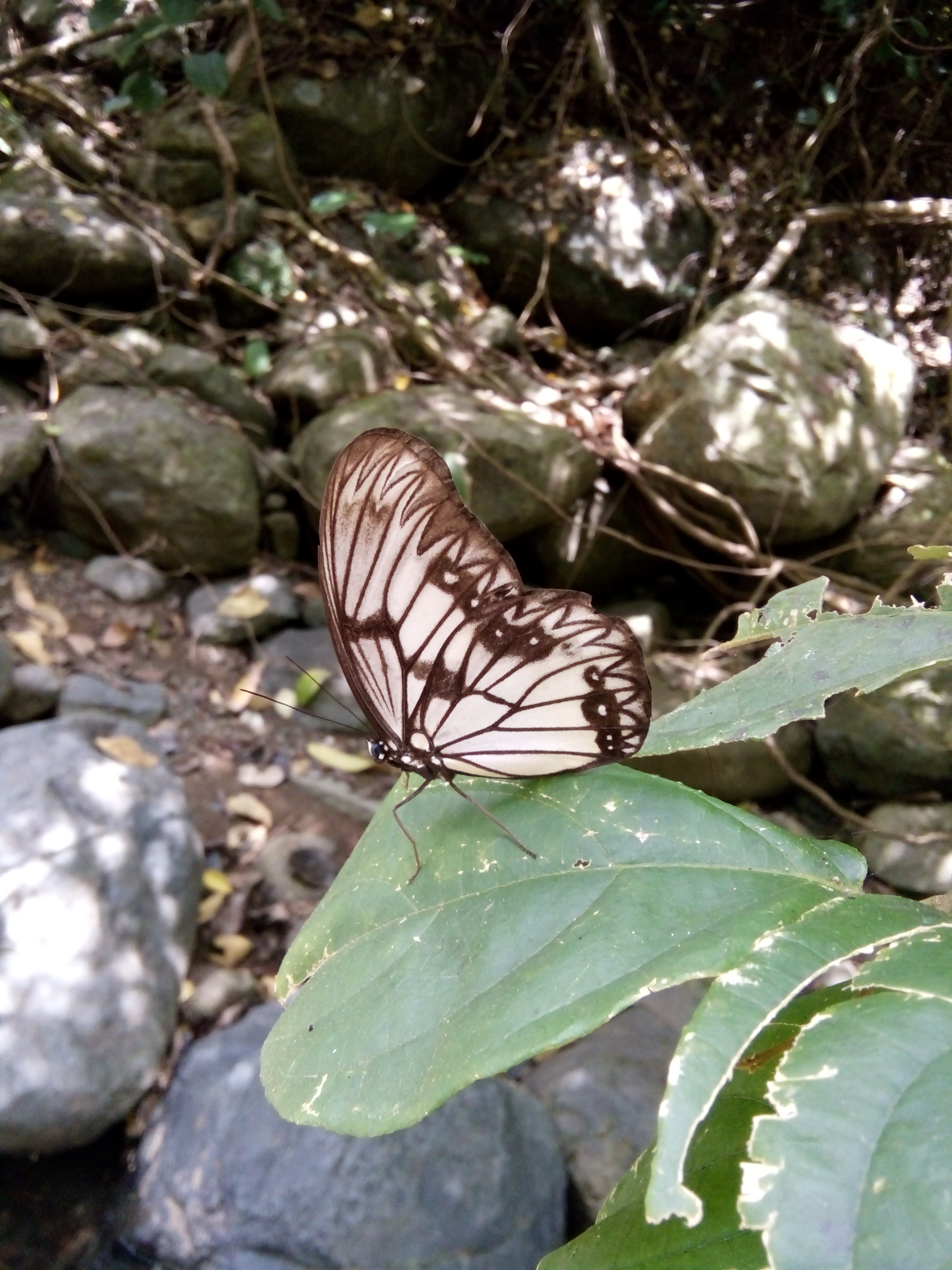
- From Sungai Buladu, Sumalata Timur, Indonesia
- male pinned specimen

Scientific classification
- Kingdom: Animalia
- Phylum: Arthropoda
- Clade: Pancrustacea
- Class: Insecta
- Order: Lepidoptera
- Family: Nymphalidae
- Genus: Zethera
- Species: Z. incerta

Binomial name
- Zethera incerta (Hewitson, 1869)

Synonyms
- Amechania incerta Hewitson, 1861

= Zethera incerta =

Species of butterfly

Zethera incerta, the great Wallacean, is butterfly endemic to the island of Sulawesi in Indonesia. It was described by William Chapman Hewitson in 1869.

== Subspecies ==
- Z. i. incerta (North Sulawesi)
- Z. i. tenggara Roos, 1992 (Southeast Sulawesi)
