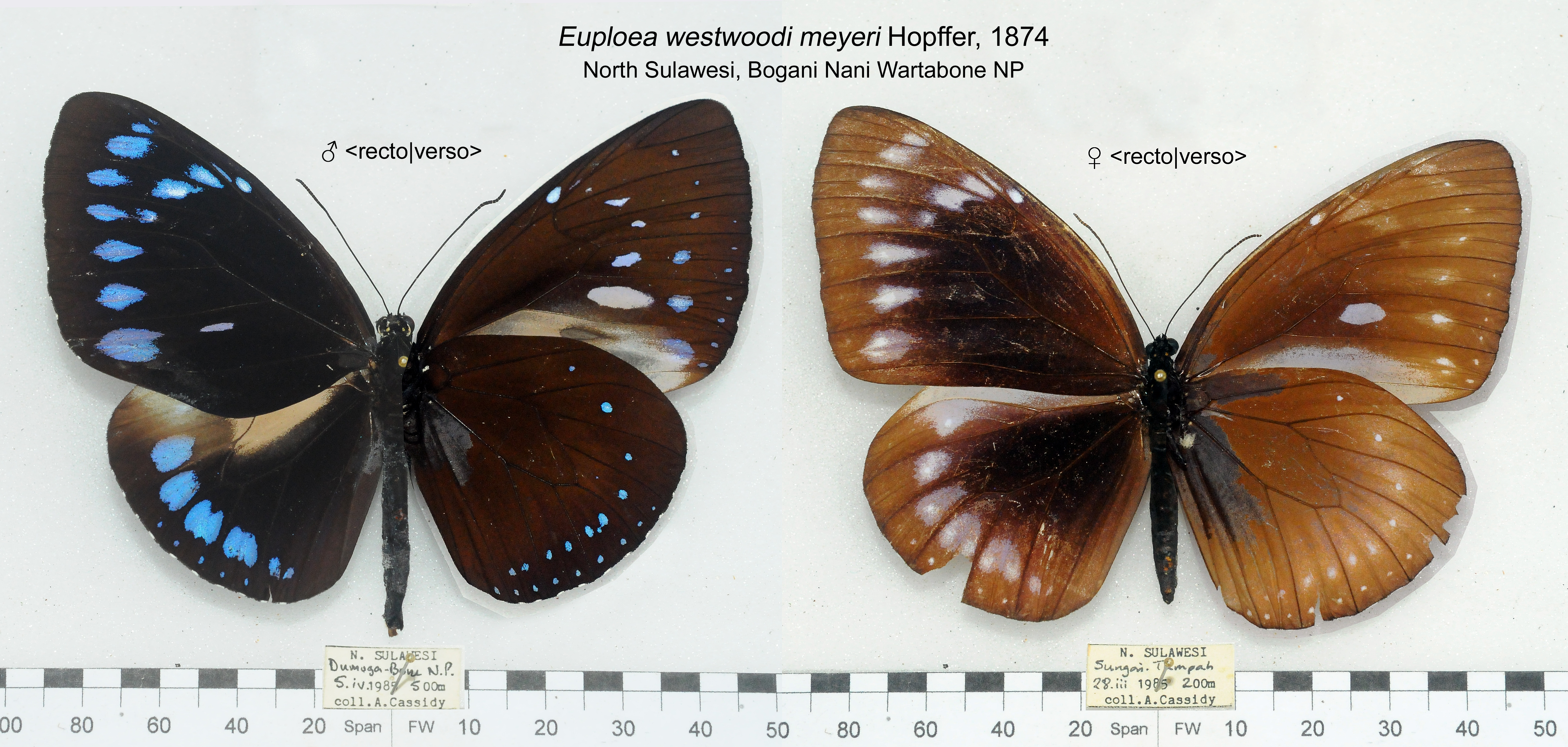
- Euploea westwoodii meyeri

Scientific classification
- Kingdom: Animalia
- Phylum: Arthropoda
- Clade: Pancrustacea
- Class: Insecta
- Order: Lepidoptera
- Family: Nymphalidae
- Genus: Euploea
- Species: E. westwoodii

Binomial name
- Euploea westwoodii Felder C. & Felder R., 1865

Synonyms
- Euploea westwoodii C. & R. Felder, [1865]; Salpinx weberi Moore, 1883; Salpinx brandti Moore, 1883; Salpinx (Euploea) platenae Staudinger, 1895; upis Fruhstorfer, 1910; perizonia Fruhstorfer, 1910; nivira Fruhstorfer, 1910; aisa Fruhstorfer, 1910; bongila Hulstaert, 1931; Euploea viola Butler, 1866; Euploea meyeri Hopffer, 1874; Salpinx labreyi Moore, 1883; Salpinx leucostictos bangkaiensis Fruhstorfer, 1899

= Euploea westwoodii =

Species of butterfly

Euploea westwoodii, or Westwood's king crow, is a butterfly in the family Nymphalidae. It was described by Cajetan Felder and Rudolf Felder in 1865. It is found in the Celebes in the Australasian realm.

== Subspecies ==
- E. w. westwoodii (South Sulawesi)
- E. w. viola Butler, 1866 (Sulawesi)
- E. w. meyeri Hopffer, 1874 (Sulawesi)
- E. w. labreyi (Moore, 1883) (Sula Islands)
- E. w. bangkaiensis (Fruhstorfer, 1899) (Banggai Islands)
- E. w. leochares Fruhstorfer, 1910 (Salajar)

== Etymology ==
The species is named for John Obadiah Westwood.
