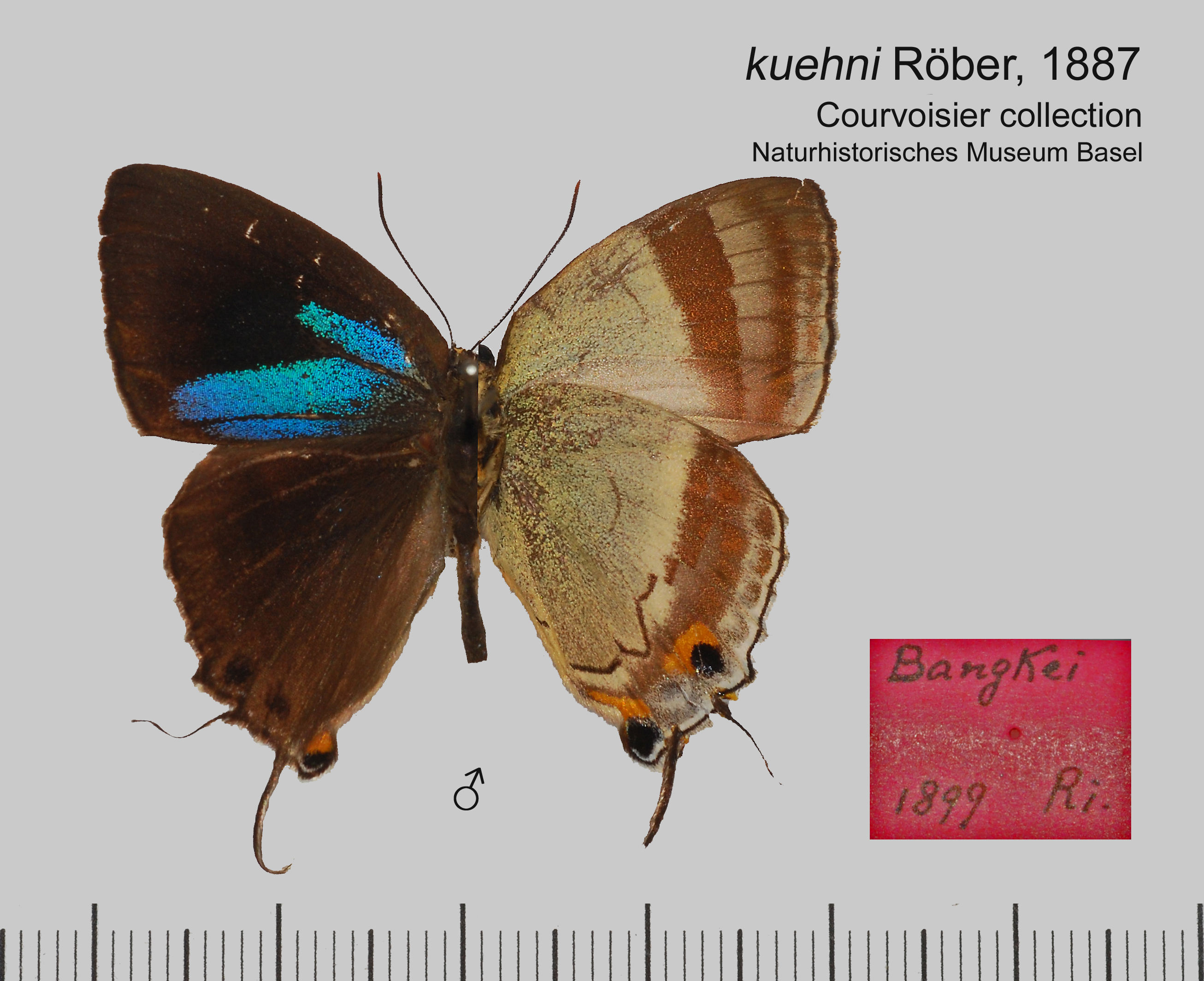
- From the Courvoisier Collection, Basel, Switzerland
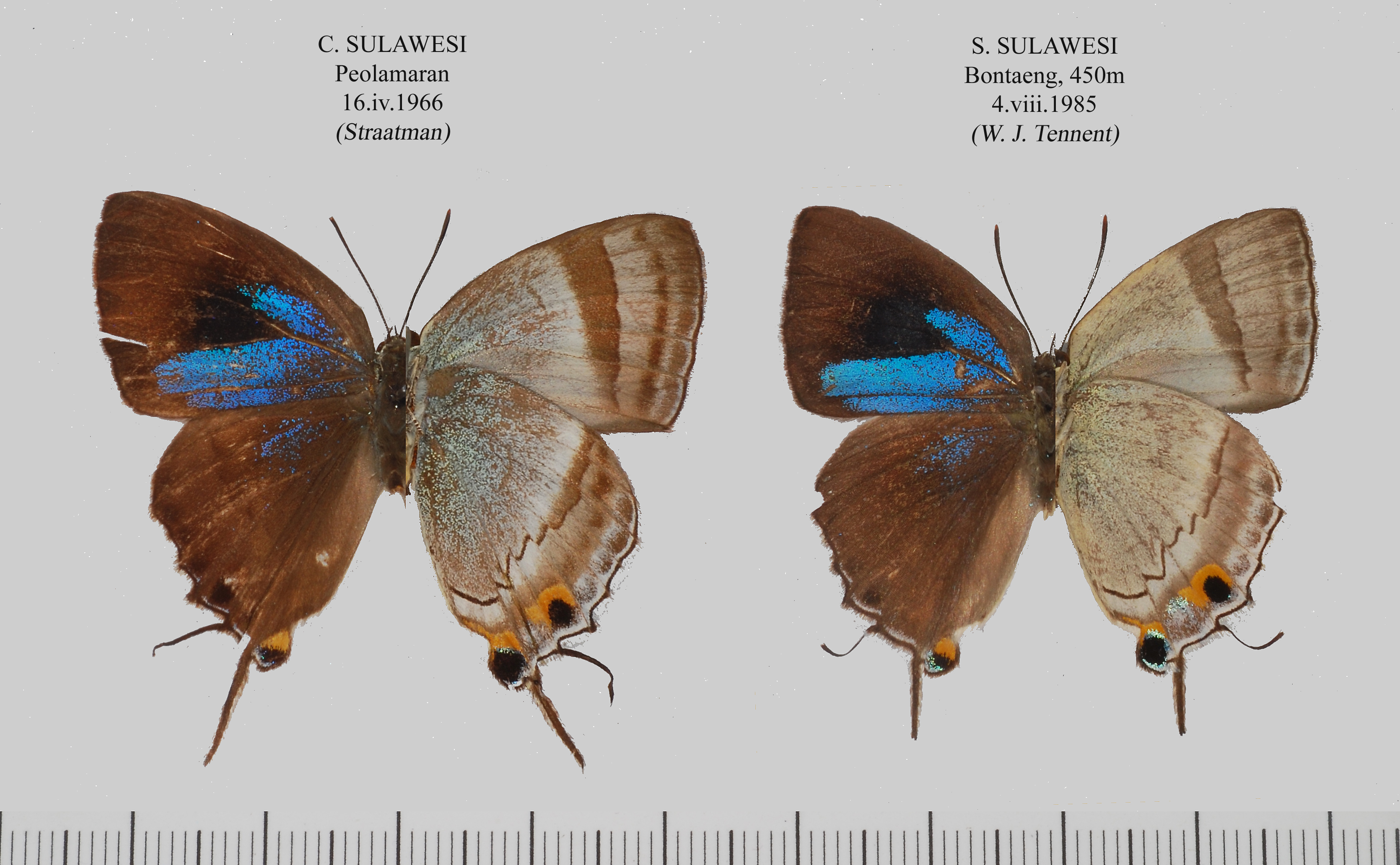
- Paruparo kuehni regulus

Scientific classification
- Kingdom: Animalia
- Phylum: Arthropoda
- Class: Insecta
- Order: Lepidoptera
- Family: Lycaenidae
- Genus: Paruparo
- Species: P. kuehni

Binomial name
- Paruparo kuehni (Röber, 1887)

Synonyms
- Jolaus kuehni Röber, 1887; Tajuria kuehni birumki Ribbe, 1926; Jolaus kuehni var. regulus Staudinger, 1888

= Paruparo kuehni =

Species of butterfly

Paruparo kuehni is a butterfly in the family Lycaenidae. It was described by Julius Röber in 1887. It is found in Sulawesi in the Australasian realm.

== Subspecies ==
- Paruparo kuehni kuehni (Banggai, central Sulawesi)
- Paruparo kuehni regulus (Staudinger, 1888) (northern Sulawesi)
