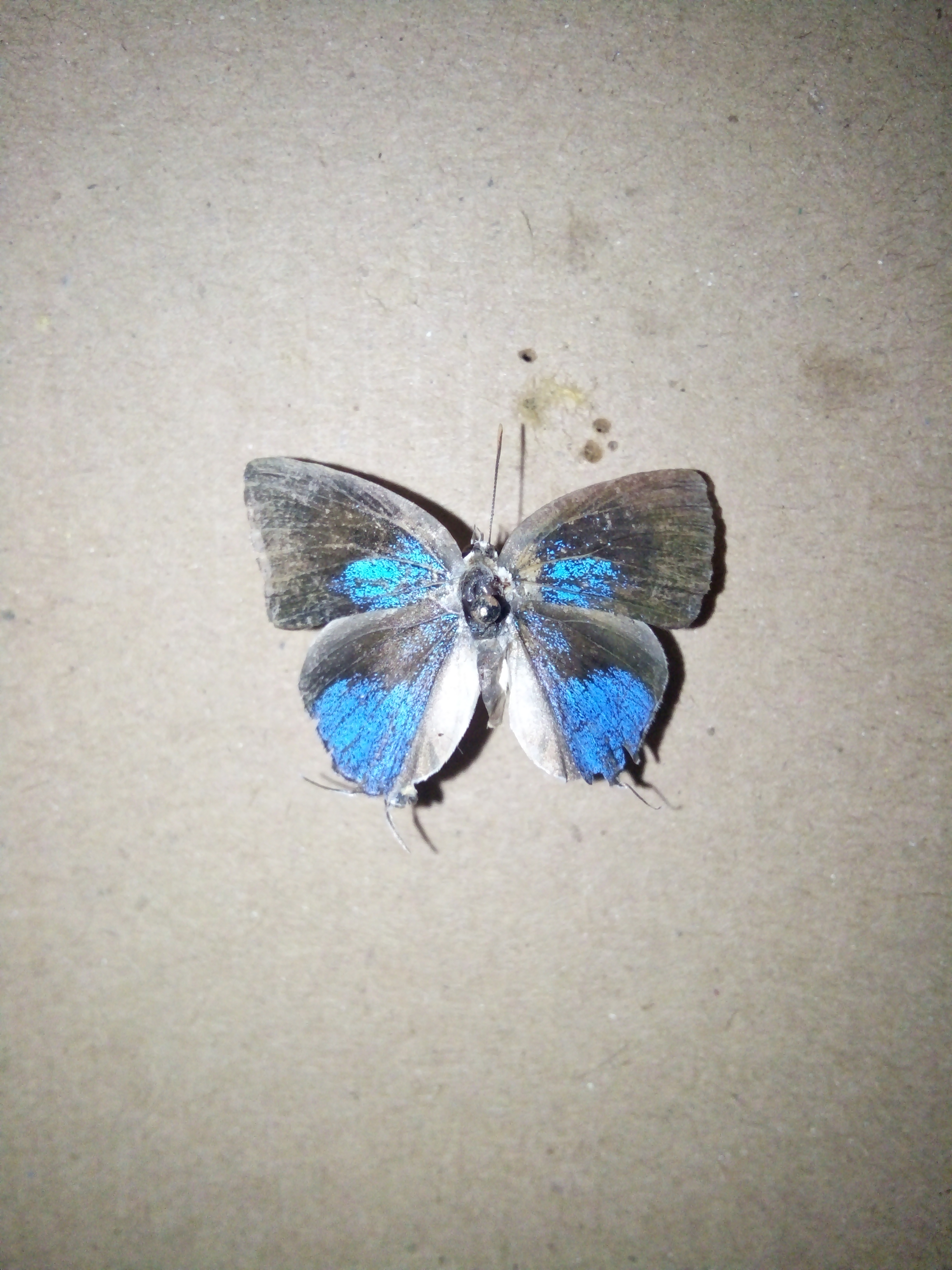
- From the Courvoisier Collection, Basel, Switzerland

Scientific classification
- Domain: Eukaryota
- Kingdom: Animalia
- Phylum: Arthropoda
- Class: Insecta
- Order: Lepidoptera
- Family: Lycaenidae
- Genus: Tajuria
- Species: T. iapyx

Binomial name
- Tajuria iapyx (Hewitson, 1865)

Synonyms
- Iolaus iapyx Hewitson, 1865; Tajuria japyx massicus Fruhstorfer, 1912; Tajuria japyx libori Ribbe, 1926; Tajuria japyx liberi f. metani Ribbe, 1926

= Tajuria iapyx =

Species of butterfly

Tajuria iapyx is a butterfly endemic to the island of Sulawesi. It was described by William Chapman Hewitson in 1865.

== Subspecies ==
- T. i. iapyx (Sulawesi)
- T. i. banggaianus Ribbe, 1926 (Banggai)
