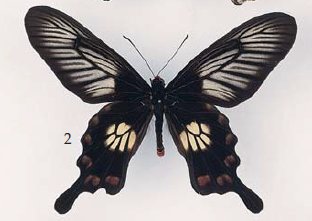

Scientific classification
- Kingdom: Animalia
- Phylum: Arthropoda
- Clade: Pancrustacea
- Class: Insecta
- Order: Lepidoptera
- Family: Papilionidae
- Genus: Pachliopta
- Species: P. polyphontes

Binomial name
- Pachliopta polyphontes (Boisduval, 1836)

Synonyms
- Papilio polyphontes Boisduval, 1836; Papilio polyphontes Rothschild, 1895; Pachlioptera polyphontes; Atrophaneura polyphontes (Boisduval, 1836)

= Pachliopta polyphontes =

Species of butterfly

Pachliopta polyphontes is a species of butterfly from the family Papilionidae that is found in Sulawesi and on the Moluccas.

== Subspecies ==
- Pachliopta polyphontes polyphontes (Sulawesi, Talaud)
- Pachliopta polyphontes rosea (Oberthür, 1879) (Selajar Islands)
- Pachliopta polyphontes aipytos Fruhstorfer (Sula Islands)
- Pachliopta polyphontes sejanus Fruhstorfer (Bachan, Halmahera, Ternate, Morotai)
