= Striped black crow =

Striped black crow is a common name shared by three species of butterflies in the genus Euploea:

- Euploea alcathoe
- Euploea doubledayi
- Euploea eyndhovii
