= Sumatran crow =

Conservation status
- Near Threatened (IUCN 2.3)

Scientific classification
- Kingdom: Animalia
- Phylum: Arthropoda
- Clade: Pancrustacea
- Class: Insecta
- Order: Lepidoptera
- Family: Nymphalidae
- Genus: Euploea
- Species: E. martinii

Binomial name
- Euploea martinii de Nicéville, 1893

Species of butterfly

The Sumatran crow (Euploea martinii) is a species of nymphalid butterfly in the Danainae subfamily. It is endemic to Sumatra, Indonesia.The name honours Ludwig Martin.
