= Cordelia's crow =

Conservation status
- Vulnerable (IUCN 2.3)

Scientific classification
- Kingdom: Animalia
- Phylum: Arthropoda
- Clade: Pancrustacea
- Class: Insecta
- Order: Lepidoptera
- Family: Nymphalidae
- Genus: Euploea
- Species: E. cordelia

Binomial name
- Euploea cordelia Martin, 1912

Species of butterfly

The Cordelia's crow (Euploea cordelia) is a species of nymphalid butterfly in the Danainae subfamily. It is endemic to Sulawesi, Indonesia.
