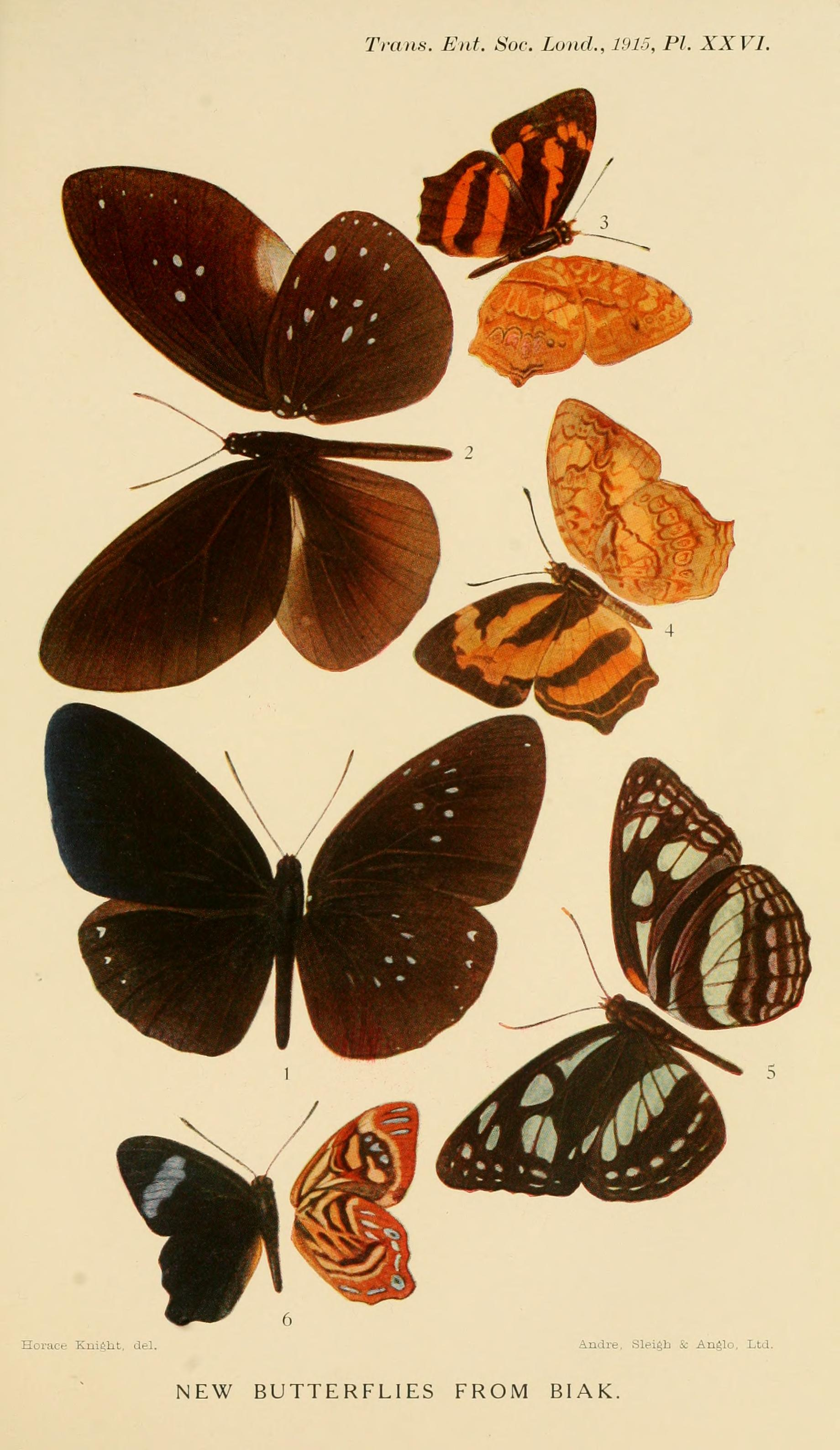

Conservation status
- Endangered (IUCN 2.3)

Scientific classification
- Kingdom: Animalia
- Phylum: Arthropoda
- Clade: Pancrustacea
- Class: Insecta
- Order: Lepidoptera
- Family: Nymphalidae
- Genus: Euploea
- Species: E. albicosta

Binomial name
- Euploea albicosta Joicey & Noakes 1915

= Biak dark crow =

Species of butterfly

The Biak dark crow (Euploea albicosta) is a species of nymphalid butterfly in the Danainae subfamily. It is endemic to Indonesia.
