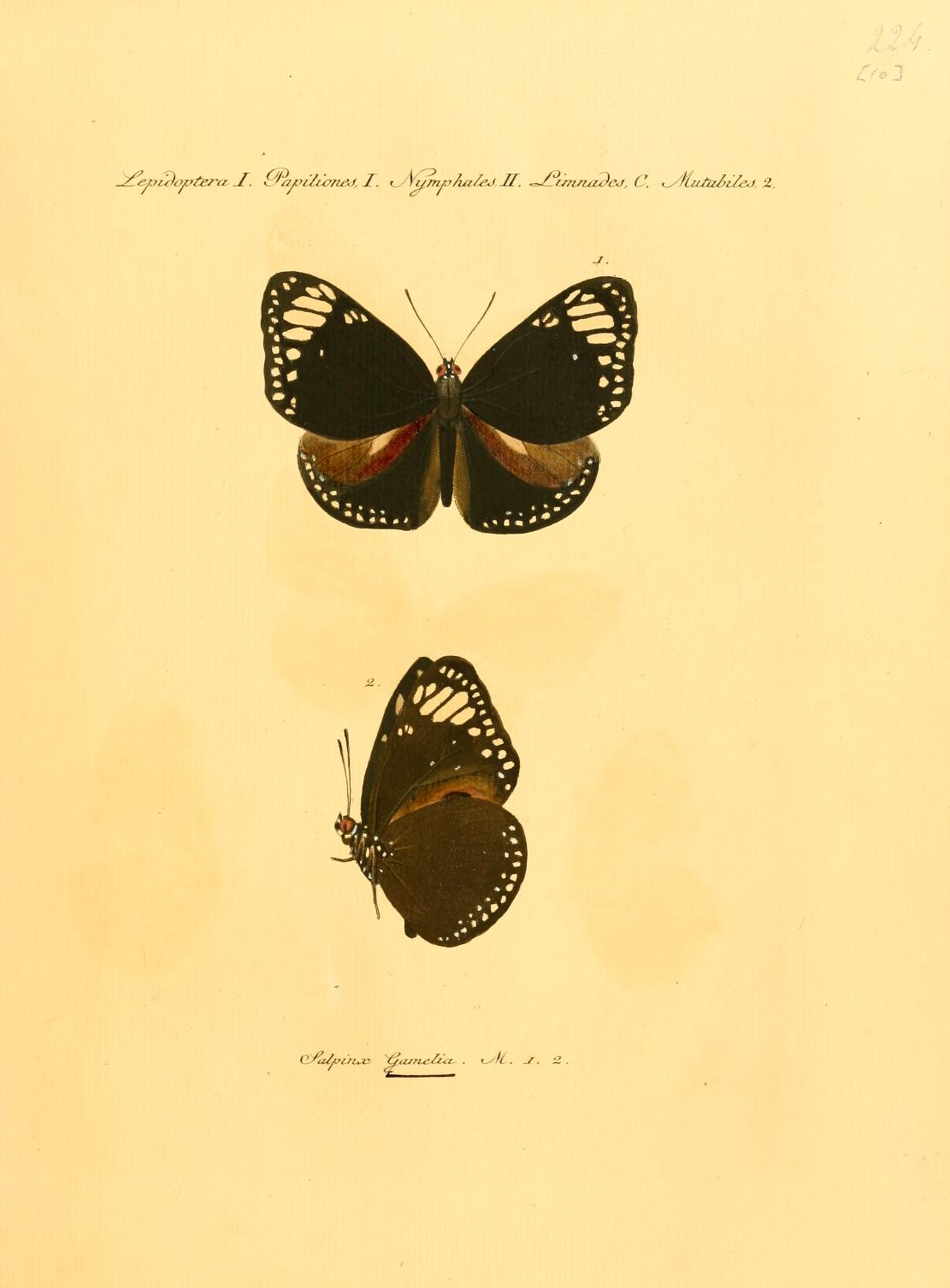

Conservation status
- Near Threatened (IUCN 2.3)

Scientific classification
- Kingdom: Animalia
- Phylum: Arthropoda
- Clade: Pancrustacea
- Class: Insecta
- Order: Lepidoptera
- Family: Nymphalidae
- Genus: Euploea
- Species: E. gamelia

Binomial name
- Euploea gamelia (Hübner, 1825)

= Javan crow =

Species of butterfly

The Javan crow (Euploea gamelia) is a species of nymphalid butterfly in the Danainae subfamily. It is endemic to Indonesia (Java).
