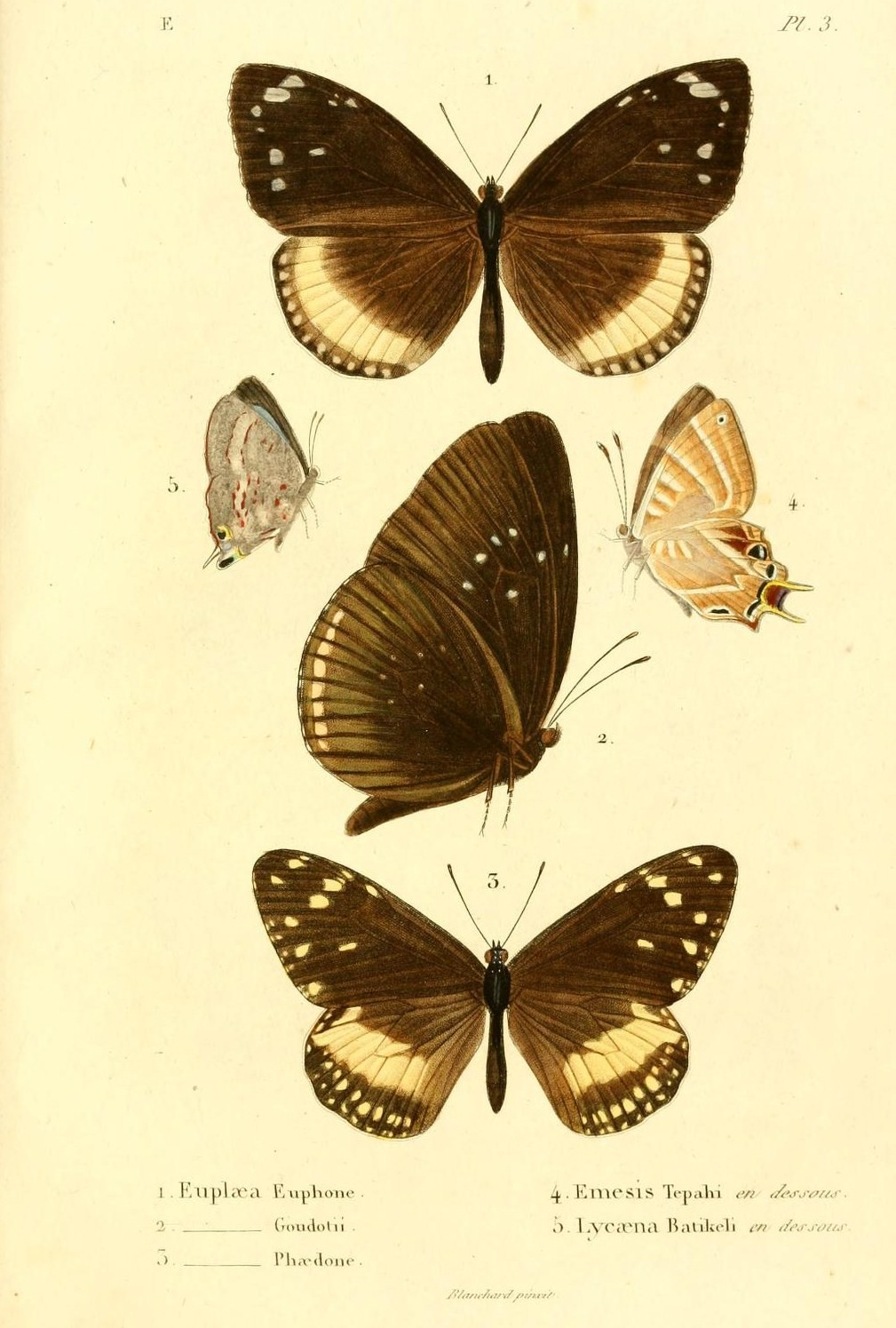
- Euploea goudotii figure 2

Scientific classification
- Kingdom: Animalia
- Phylum: Arthropoda
- Clade: Pancrustacea
- Class: Insecta
- Order: Lepidoptera
- Family: Nymphalidae
- Genus: Euploea
- Species: E. goudotii

Binomial name
- Euploea goudotii Boisduval, 1833

Synonyms
- Euploea euphon goudotii

= Euploea goudotii =

Species of butterfly

Euploea goudotii is a butterfly in the family Nymphalidae. It is endemic to La Réunion.

== Description ==
This large brown butterfly has a band of white spots on the ends of the forewings. Its hindwings are lighter brown and have larger white areas, and smaller white dots.

The caterpillar has horns and a dark band on its back, with its sides being orange-pink.

The chrysalis is silver in colour.

== Etymology ==
It is named for Justin Goudot.
