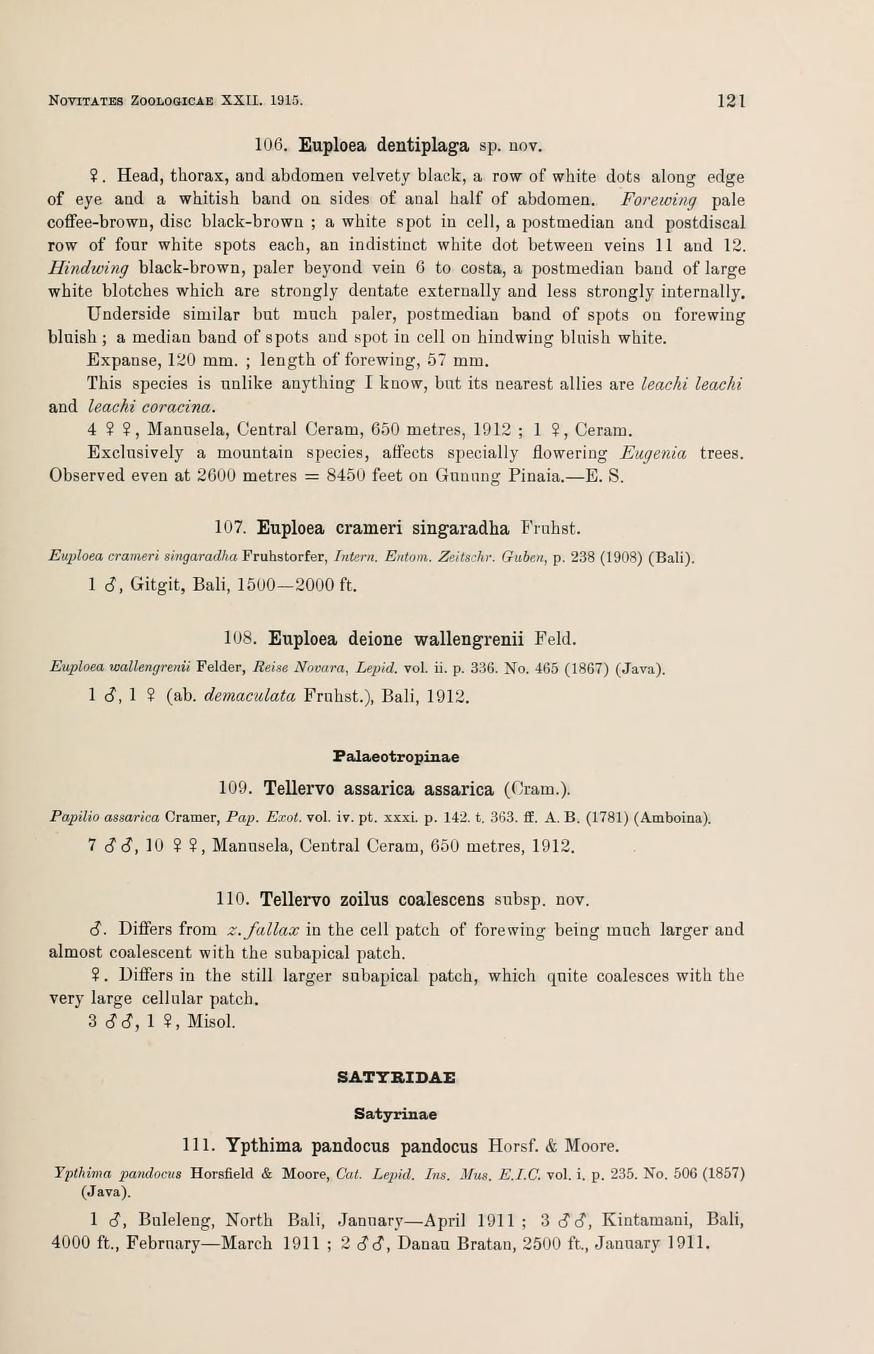
- Original description

Conservation status
- Least Concern (IUCN 2.3)

Scientific classification
- Kingdom: Animalia
- Phylum: Arthropoda
- Class: Insecta
- Order: Lepidoptera
- Family: Nymphalidae
- Genus: Euploea
- Species: E. dentiplaga

Binomial name
- Euploea dentiplaga Rothschild, 1915

= Seram crow =

Species of butterfly

The Seram crow (Euploea dentiplaga) is a species of nymphalid butterfly in the Danainae subfamily. It is endemic to Indonesia.
