= Murphy's crow =

Conservation status
- Endangered (IUCN 2.3)

Scientific classification
- Kingdom: Animalia
- Phylum: Arthropoda
- Clade: Pancrustacea
- Class: Insecta
- Order: Lepidoptera
- Family: Nymphalidae
- Genus: Euploea
- Species: E. caespes

Binomial name
- Euploea caespes Ackery & Vane-Wright, 1984

Species of butterfly

The Murphy's crow (Euploea caespes) is a species of nymphalid butterfly in the Danainae subfamily. It is endemic to Indonesia.
