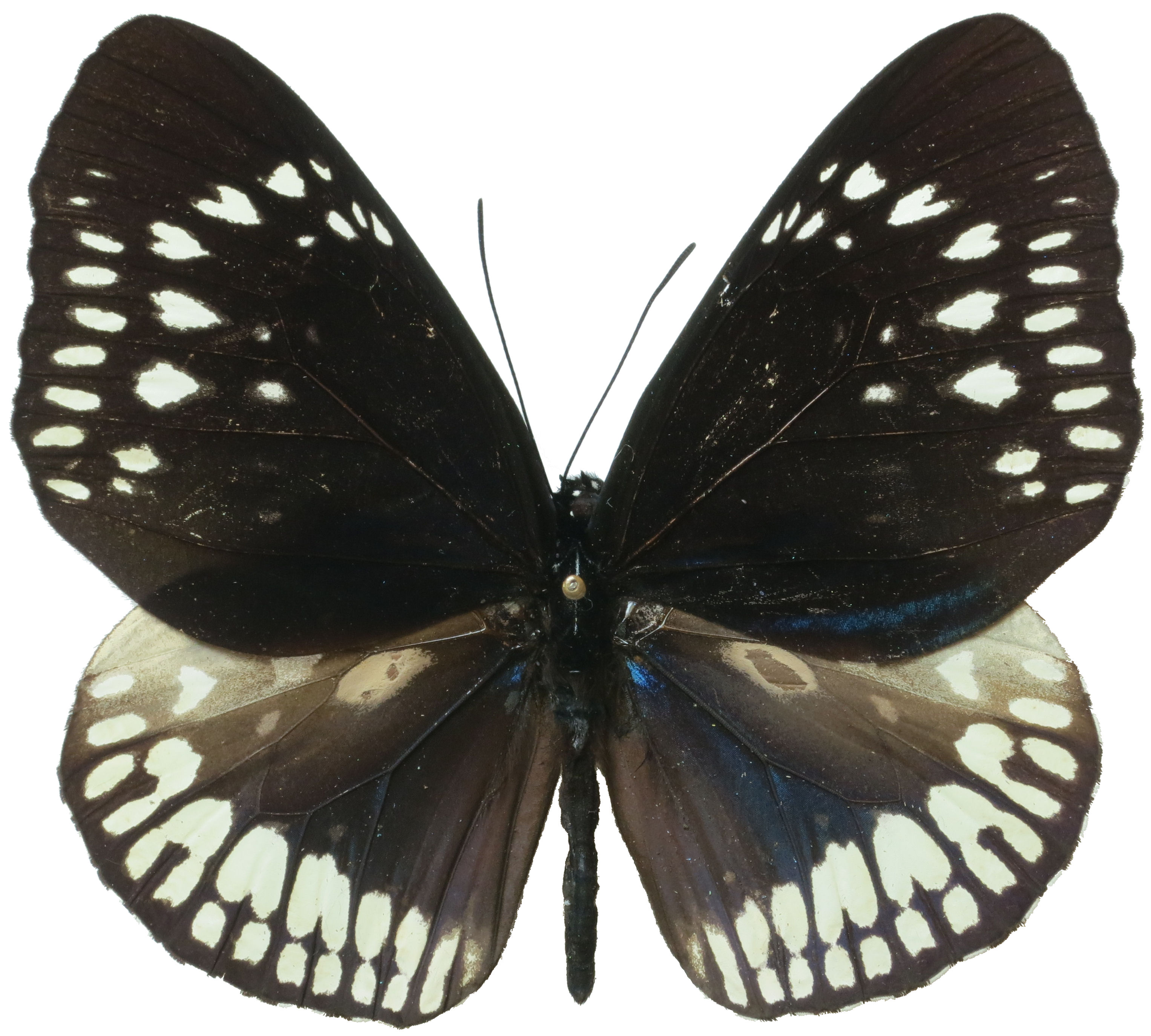
- Euploea blossomae from Ifugao, Philippines

Conservation status
- Near Threatened (IUCN 2.3)

Scientific classification
- Kingdom: Animalia
- Phylum: Arthropoda
- Clade: Pancrustacea
- Class: Insecta
- Order: Lepidoptera
- Family: Nymphalidae
- Genus: Euploea
- Species: E. blossomae

Binomial name
- Euploea blossomae Schaus, 1929

= Schaus's crow =

Schaus' crow

Species of butterfly

The Schaus's crow (Euploea blossomae) is a species of nymphalid butterfly in the Danainae subfamily. Its common name is due to the author who first described it, William Schaus. It is endemic to the Philippines.
