= Bismark crow =

Conservation status
- Least Concern (IUCN 2.3)

Scientific classification
- Kingdom: Animalia
- Phylum: Arthropoda
- Clade: Pancrustacea
- Class: Insecta
- Order: Lepidoptera
- Family: Nymphalidae
- Genus: Euploea
- Species: E. eboraci

Binomial name
- Euploea eboraci (Grose-Smith, 1894)

Species of butterfly

The Bismark crow (Euploea eboraci) is a species of nymphalid butterfly in the Danainae subfamily. It is endemic to Papua New Guinea.
