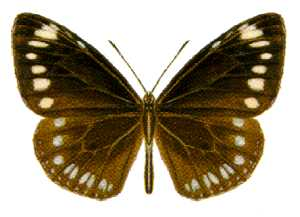

Scientific classification
- Kingdom: Animalia
- Phylum: Arthropoda
- Clade: Pancrustacea
- Class: Insecta
- Order: Lepidoptera
- Family: Nymphalidae
- Genus: Euploea
- Species: E. darchia

Binomial name
- Euploea darchia MacLeay, 1826

= Small brown crow =

Species of butterfly

The small brown crow (Euploea darchia) is a butterfly found in Australia that belongs to the crows and tigers, that is, the danaid group of the brush-footed butterflies family.
