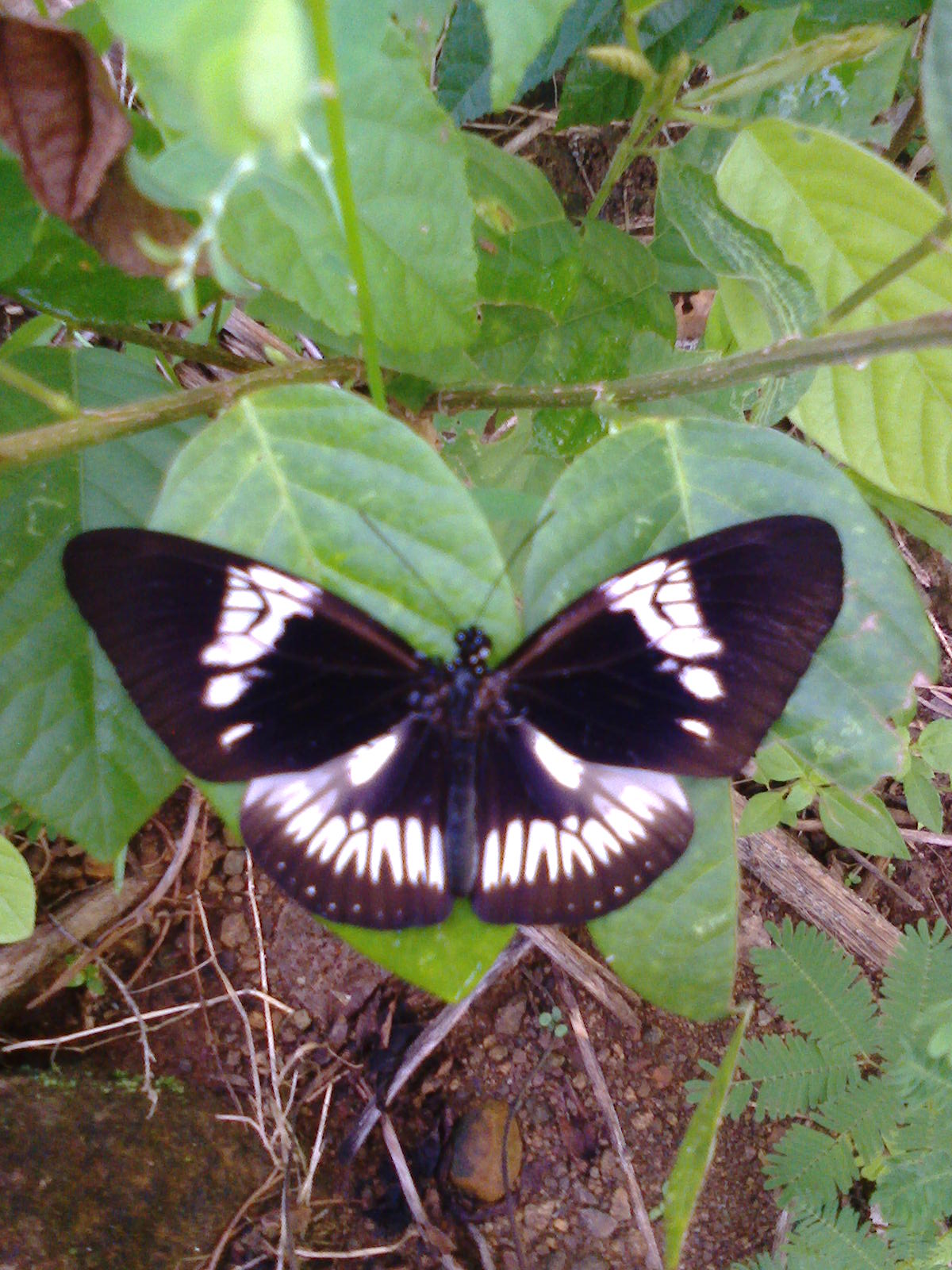
- from Sungai Pontolo, North Gorontalo, Sulawesi

Conservation status
- Least Concern (IUCN 2.3)

Scientific classification
- Kingdom: Animalia
- Phylum: Arthropoda
- Clade: Pancrustacea
- Class: Insecta
- Order: Lepidoptera
- Family: Nymphalidae
- Genus: Euploea
- Species: E. eupator

Binomial name
- Euploea eupator Hewitson, 1858

= Sulawesi pied crow =

Species of butterfly

The Sulawesi pied crow or Vanoort's crow (Euploea eupator) is a species of nymphalid butterfly in the Danainae subfamily. It is endemic to Sulawesi, Indonesia.
