= Pagenstecher's crow =

Conservation status
- Least Concern (IUCN 2.3)

Scientific classification
- Kingdom: Animalia
- Phylum: Arthropoda
- Clade: Pancrustacea
- Class: Insecta
- Order: Lepidoptera
- Family: Nymphalidae
- Genus: Euploea
- Species: E. doretta

Binomial name
- Euploea doretta Pagenstecher, 1894

Species of butterfly

Pagenstecher's crow (Euploea doretta) is a species of nymphalid butterfly in the Danainae subfamily. It is endemic to Papua New Guinea.
