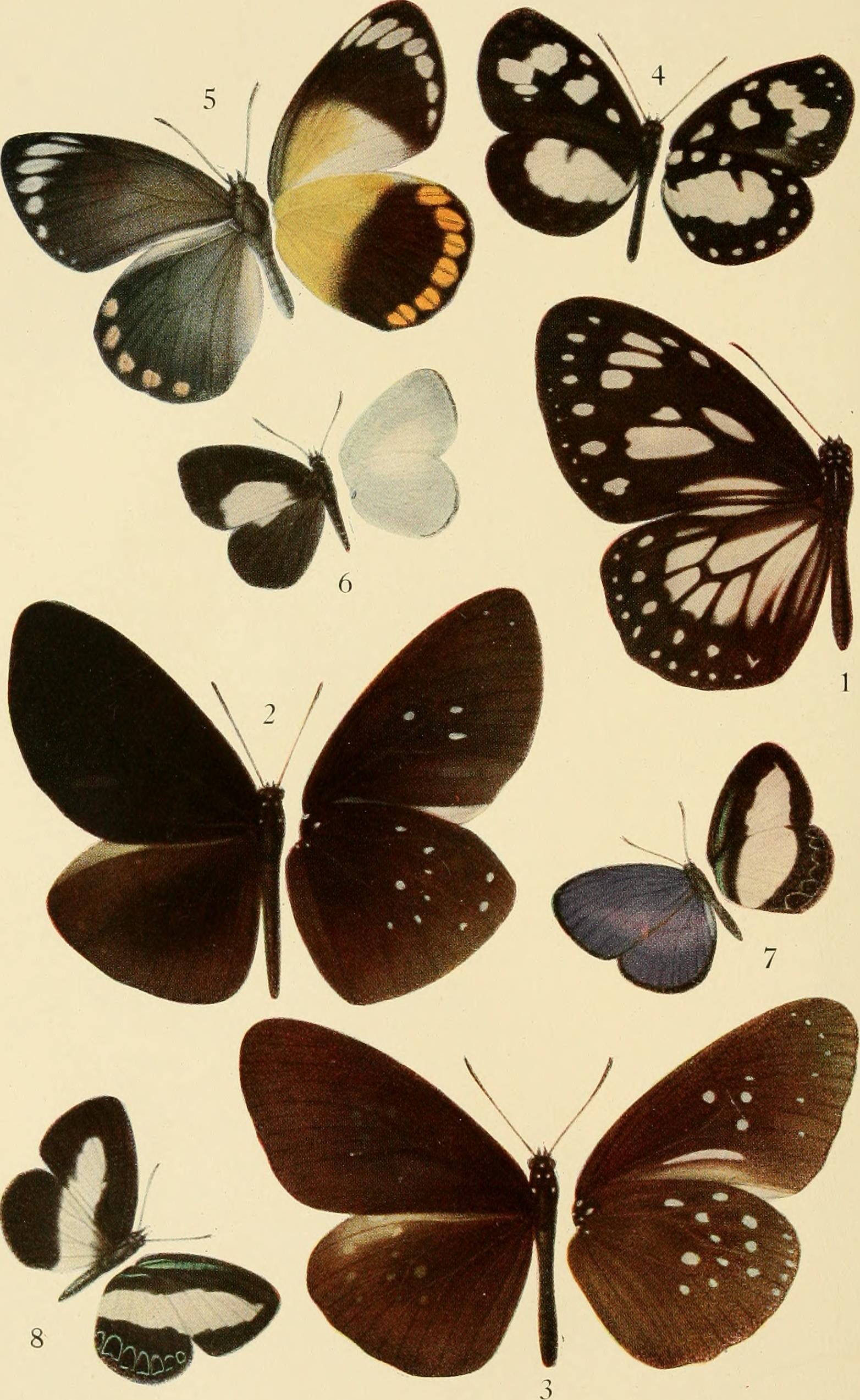
- Euploea morosa lugubris (figures 2, 3)

Scientific classification
- Kingdom: Animalia
- Phylum: Arthropoda
- Clade: Pancrustacea
- Class: Insecta
- Order: Lepidoptera
- Family: Nymphalidae
- Genus: Euploea
- Species: E. morosa

Binomial name
- Euploea morosa Butler, 1866

Synonyms
- Euploea morosa Butler, 1866; Euploea morosina Fruhstorfer, 1910; Euploea morosa gebehensis van Eecke, 1915; Chirosa lugubris Grose-Smith, 1894

= Euploea morosa =

Species of butterfly

Euploea morosa is a butterfly in the family Nymphalidae. It was described by Arthur Gardiner Butler in 1866. It is found in the Australasian realm.

== Subspecies ==
- E. m. morosa (Ternate, Bachan, Halmahera, Obi)
- E. m. lugubris (Grose-Smith, 1894) (Biak)
