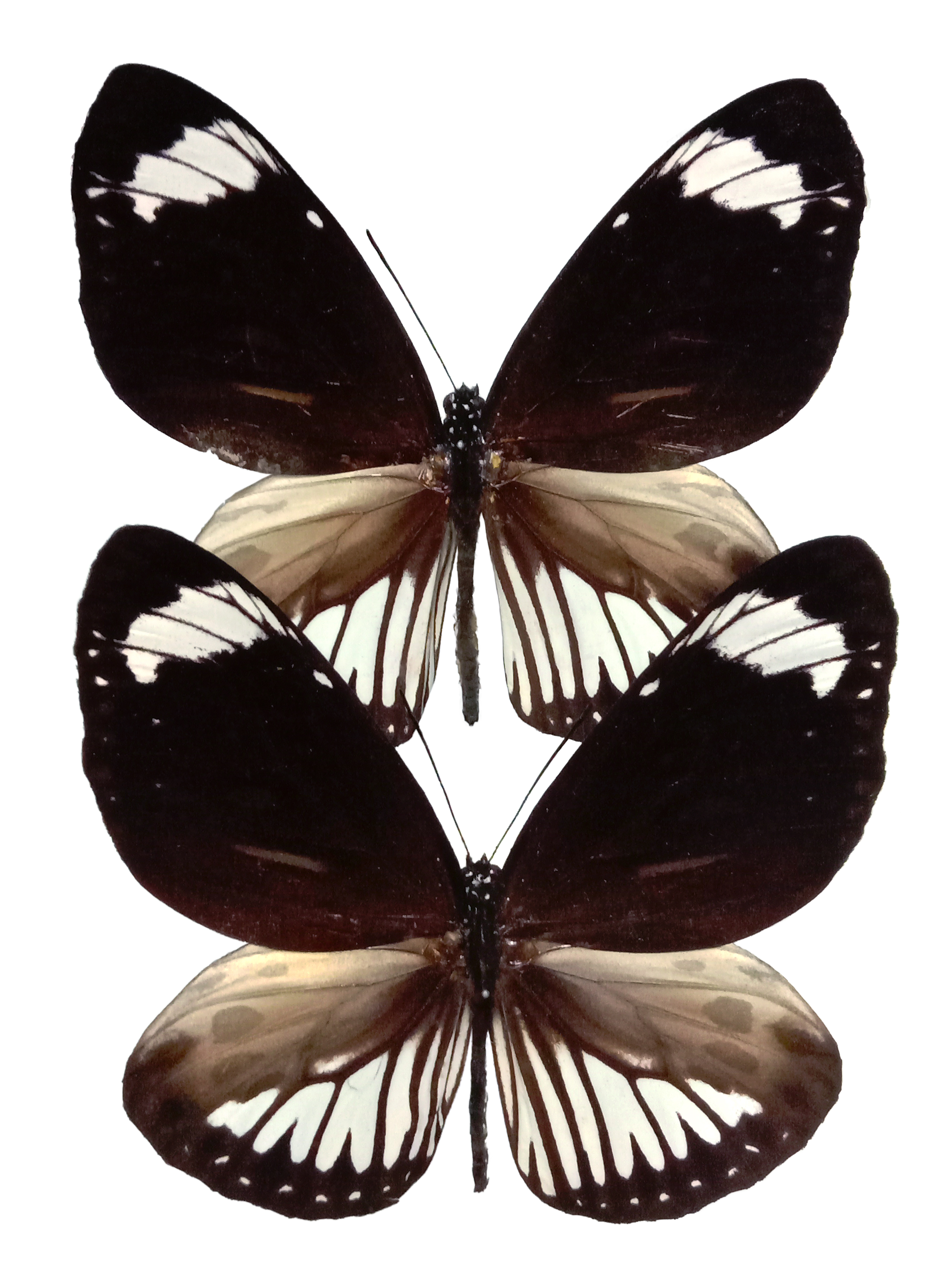
- Dorsal view of male museum specimens (NMNS)

Conservation status
- Near Threatened (IUCN 2.3)

Scientific classification
- Kingdom: Animalia
- Phylum: Arthropoda
- Clade: Pancrustacea
- Class: Insecta
- Order: Lepidoptera
- Family: Nymphalidae
- Genus: Euploea
- Species: E. tobleri

Binomial name
- Euploea tobleri Semper, 1878

= Tobler's crow =

Species of butterfly

The Tobler's crow (Euploea tobleri) is a species of nymphalid butterfly in the Danainae subfamily. It is endemic to the Philippines.
