= Euploea desjardinsii =

Scientific classification
- Kingdom: Animalia
- Phylum: Arthropoda
- Clade: Pancrustacea
- Class: Insecta
- Order: Lepidoptera
- Family: Nymphalidae
- Genus: Euploea
- Species: E. desjardinsii

Binomial name
- Euploea desjardinsii (Guérin-Méneville, 1844)

Synonyms
- Danaida (Euplea) desjardinsii Guérin-Méneville, 1844; Euploea euphon desjardinsii Guérin-Méneville, 1844

Species of butterfly

Euploea desjardinsii is a butterfly in the family Nymphalidae. It is found on Rodrigues and is likely to be extinct.
