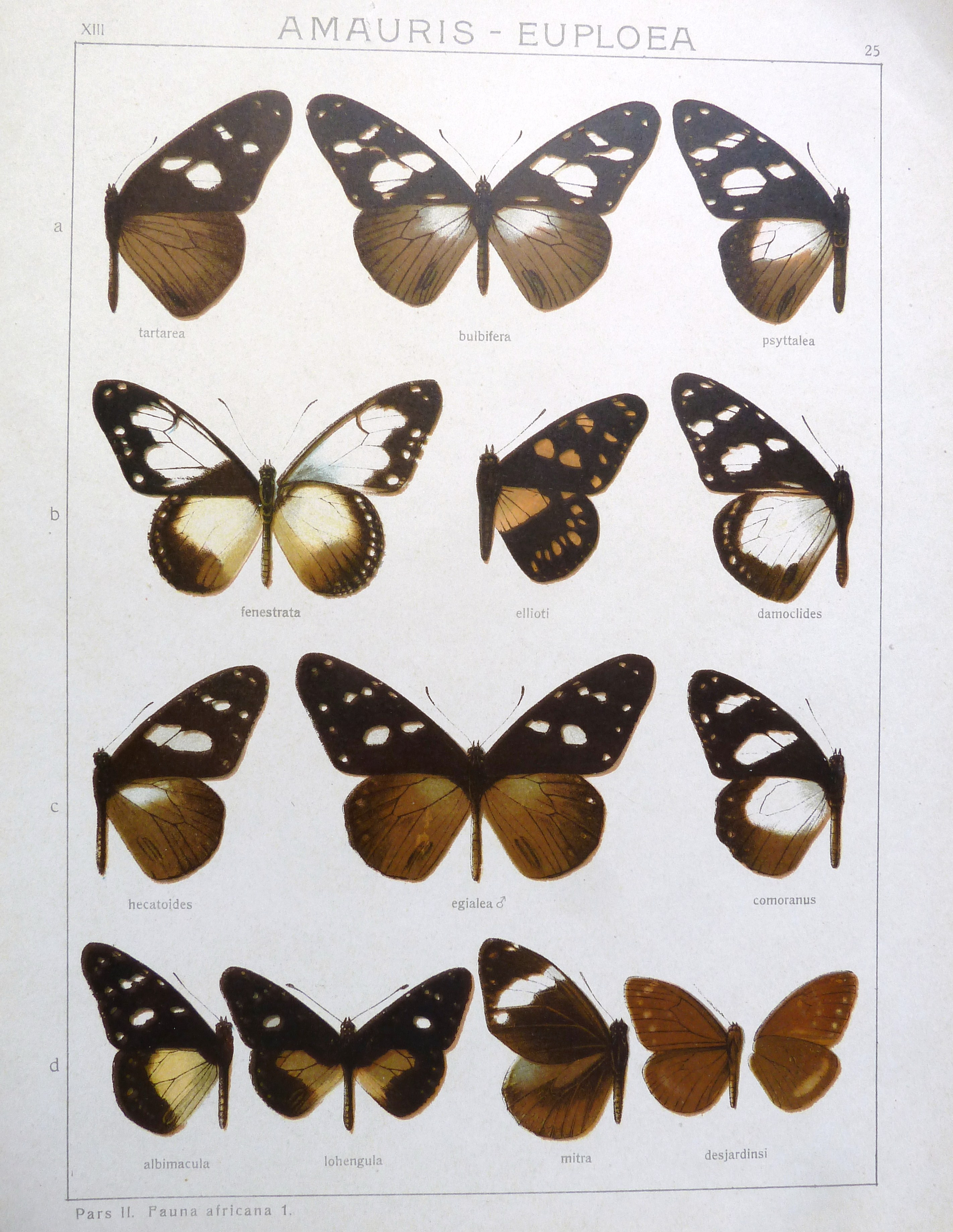
- Amauris mitra depicted in Seitz Fauna Africana

Conservation status
- Endangered (IUCN 2.3)

Scientific classification
- Kingdom: Animalia
- Phylum: Arthropoda
- Clade: Pancrustacea
- Class: Insecta
- Order: Lepidoptera
- Family: Nymphalidae
- Genus: Euploea
- Species: E. mitra

Binomial name
- Euploea mitra Moore, 1857

= Seychelles crow =

Species of butterfly

The Seychelles crow (Euploea mitra) is a species of nymphalid butterfly in the Danainae subfamily. It is endemic to the Seychelles, where it is only found on the islands of Mahe and Silhouette.
