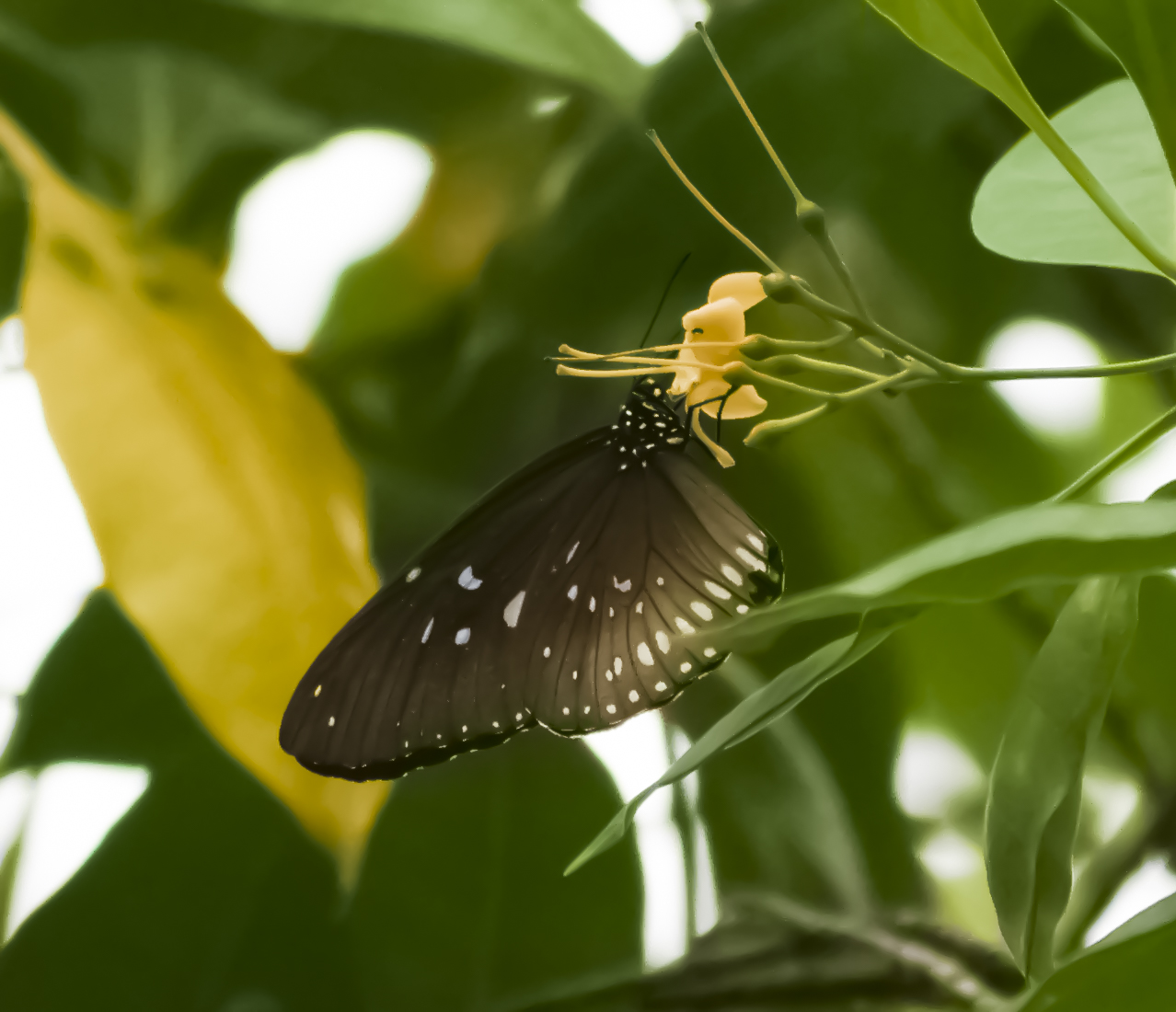

Scientific classification
- Kingdom: Animalia
- Phylum: Arthropoda
- Clade: Pancrustacea
- Class: Insecta
- Order: Lepidoptera
- Family: Nymphalidae
- Genus: Euploea
- Species: E. crameri

Binomial name
- Euploea crameri H. Lucas, 1853

= Euploea crameri =

Spotted black crow

Species of butterfly

Euploea crameri, the spotted black crow, is a butterfly found in Asia that belongs to the crows and tigers, that is, the Danaid group of the brush-footed butterflies family.

== Description ==
Shape of the wings as in Euploea godarti, Lucas. Upperside very dark brown, almost black, scarcely at all paler towards the terminal margins; forewings and hindwings with subterminal and terminal series of white spots; on the forewing the spots in the subterminal series much larger than the spots in the terminal series and bent inwards opposite apex, a spot in the apex of the cell often obsolescent and a discal series of four or five spots, of which one or two may be very small or obsolescent; on the hindwing the spots in the subterminal and terminal series sub-equal. Underside chocolate-brown, the white spots as on the upperside but more distinct, and in the hindwing with the addition of a spot in the apex of the cell and five or six discal small spots beyond. The antennae, head, thorax and abdomen are very dark brown, and, the antennae excepted, spotted with white beneath. It has a wingspan of 88–94 mm (3.5–3.7 in).

== Ecology ==
The spotted black crow is found in the Indomalayan realm. It is known to undertake seasonal migrations.

== Subspecies ==
- E. c. crameri Borneo
- E. c. bremeri C. Felder & R. Felder, 1860 South Burma - Peninsular Malaya, Langkawi, Singapore
- E. c. frauenfeldi C. Felder, 1862 Nicobars, Andamans
- E. c. niasica (Moore, 1883) Nias
- E. c. daatensis (Moore, 1883) North Borneo (Pulau Daat)
- E. c. labuana (Moore, 1883) North Borneo (Labuan)
- E. c. metavica Hagen, 1898 Mentawai Islands
- E. c. nicevillei (Moore, [1890]) Bengal
- E. c. heylaertsi (Moore, [1890]) Sumatra
- E. c. oceanis Doherty, 1891 Enggano
- E. c. pagenstecheri Hagen, 1896 Bawean
- E. c. tenggerensis (Fruhstorfer, 1898) East Java
- E. c. lanista Fruhstorfer, 1904 Natuna Islands
- E. c. nagasena Fruhstorfer, 1906 Batu Islands
- E. c. singaradha Fruhstorfer, 1908 Bali
- E. c. jedja Fruhstorfer, 1911 Banguey
- E. c. praedicabilis Fruhstorfer, 1914 South Vietnam
