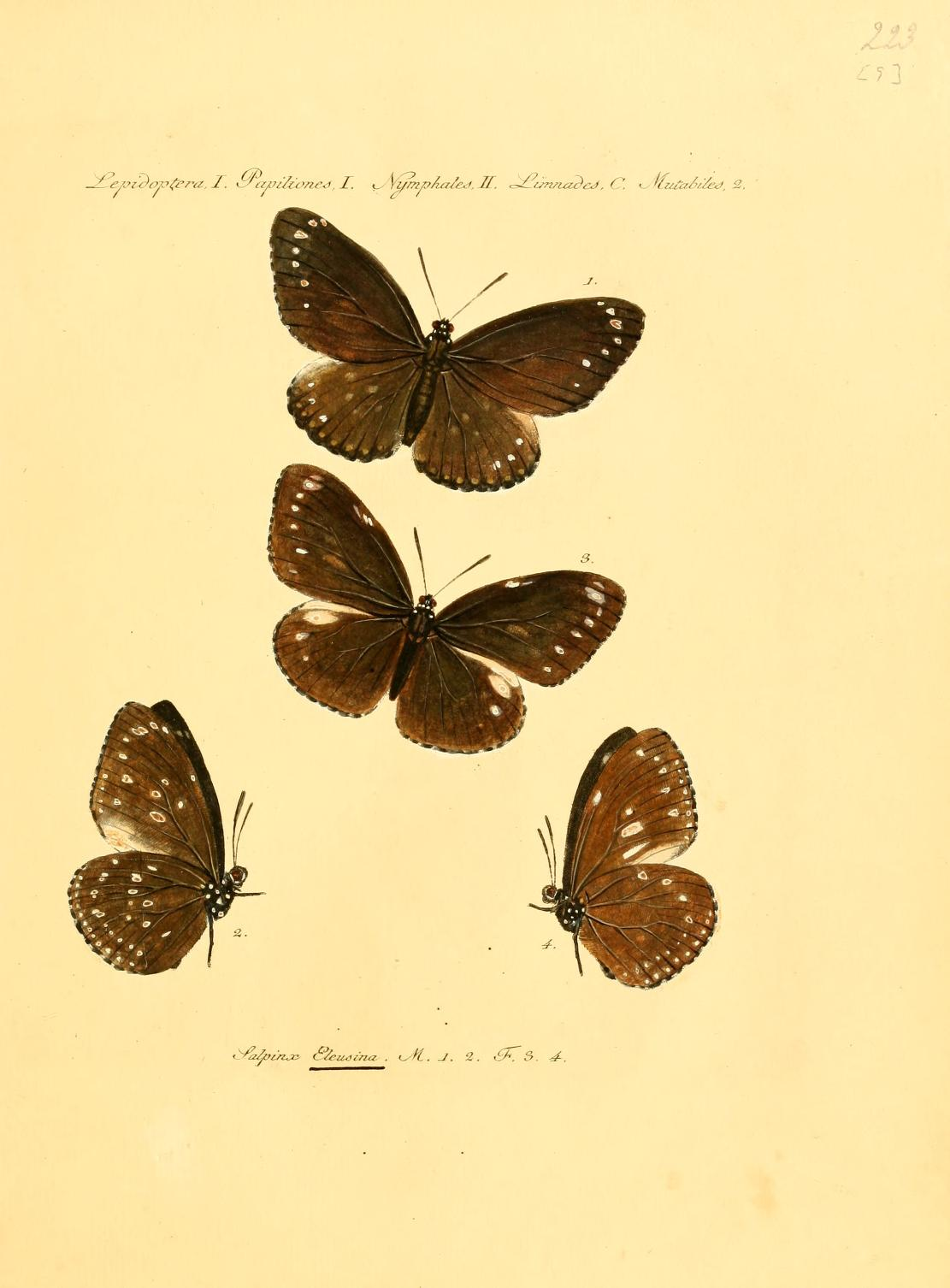
- In Jacob Hübner's Sammlung exotischer Schmetterlinge

Scientific classification
- Kingdom: Animalia
- Phylum: Arthropoda
- Clade: Pancrustacea
- Class: Insecta
- Order: Lepidoptera
- Family: Nymphalidae
- Genus: Euploea
- Species: E. eleusina

Binomial name
- Euploea eleusina Cramer, [1777]

Synonyms
- Papilio eleusina Cramer, [1780]; arona Fruhstorfer, 1910; Euploea mniszechii C. & R. Felder, 1859; Euploea vollenhovii C. & R. Felder, [1865]

= Euploea eleusina =

Species of butterfly

Euploea eleusina, or Vollenhov's crow, is a butterfly in the family Nymphalidae. It was described by Pieter Cramer in 1777. It is found in the Indomalayan realm crossing the Wallace line to Sulawesi in the Australasian realm.

== Subspecies ==
- E. e. eleusina (Java, Bali, Kangean)
- E. e. mniszechii C. & R. Felder, 1859 (South Sulawesi)
- E. e. vollenhovii C. & R. Felder, [1865] (Sulawesi)
- E. e. aganor Fruhstorfer, 1910 (Banggai Island)
- E. e. hygina Fruhstorfer, 1910 (Lombok, Sumbawa, Flores, Sumba, Alor)
- E. e. anitra Fruhstorfer, 1910 (Central Sulawesi)
- E. e. palata Fruhstorfer, 1910 (Central Sulawesi)

== Biology ==
The larva feeds on Streblus asper.
