= Sulawesi striped blue crow =

Conservation status
- Least Concern (IUCN 2.3)

Scientific classification
- Kingdom: Animalia
- Phylum: Arthropoda
- Clade: Pancrustacea
- Class: Insecta
- Order: Lepidoptera
- Family: Nymphalidae
- Genus: Euploea
- Species: E. configurata

Binomial name
- Euploea configurata Felder & Felder, 1865

Species of butterfly

The Sulawesi striped blue crow (Euploea configurata) is a species of nymphalid butterfly in the Danainae subfamily. It is endemic to Sulawesi, Indonesia.

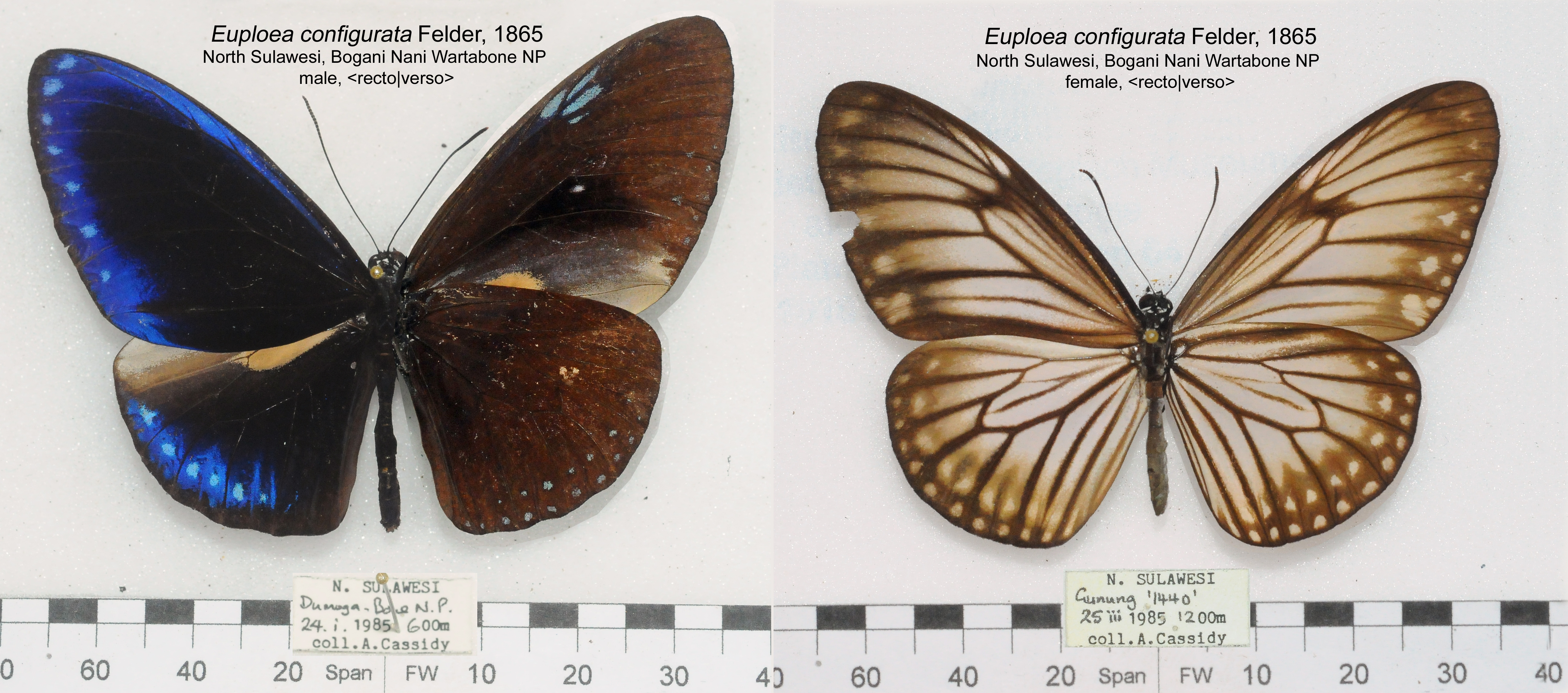
