= Euploea usipetes =

- From Hewitson's Illustrations of New Species of Exotic Butterflies

Scientific classification
- Kingdom: Animalia
- Phylum: Arthropoda
- Clade: Pancrustacea
- Class: Insecta
- Order: Lepidoptera
- Family: Nymphalidae
- Genus: Euploea
- Species: E. usipetes

Binomial name
- Euploea usipetes Hewitson, 1858

Synonyms
- purus van Eecke, 1915; Euploea hippias Miskin, 1890; Hirpada rezia Kirby, 1894; astrifera Fruhstorfer, 1910; albodiscalis Fruhstorfer, 1910

Species of butterfly

Euploea usipetes is a butterfly in the family Nymphalidae. It was described by William Chapman Hewitson in 1858. It is endemic to New Guinea and neighbouring Cape York Peninsula in the Australasian realm.

== Subspecies ==
- E. u. usipetes (New Guinea, Aru, Papua, Yule Island, Cape York, Thursday Island).
- E. u. rezia (Kirby, 1894) (West Irian, New Guinea - Papua, Yule Island, Samarai, Goodenough, Fergusson Island).
