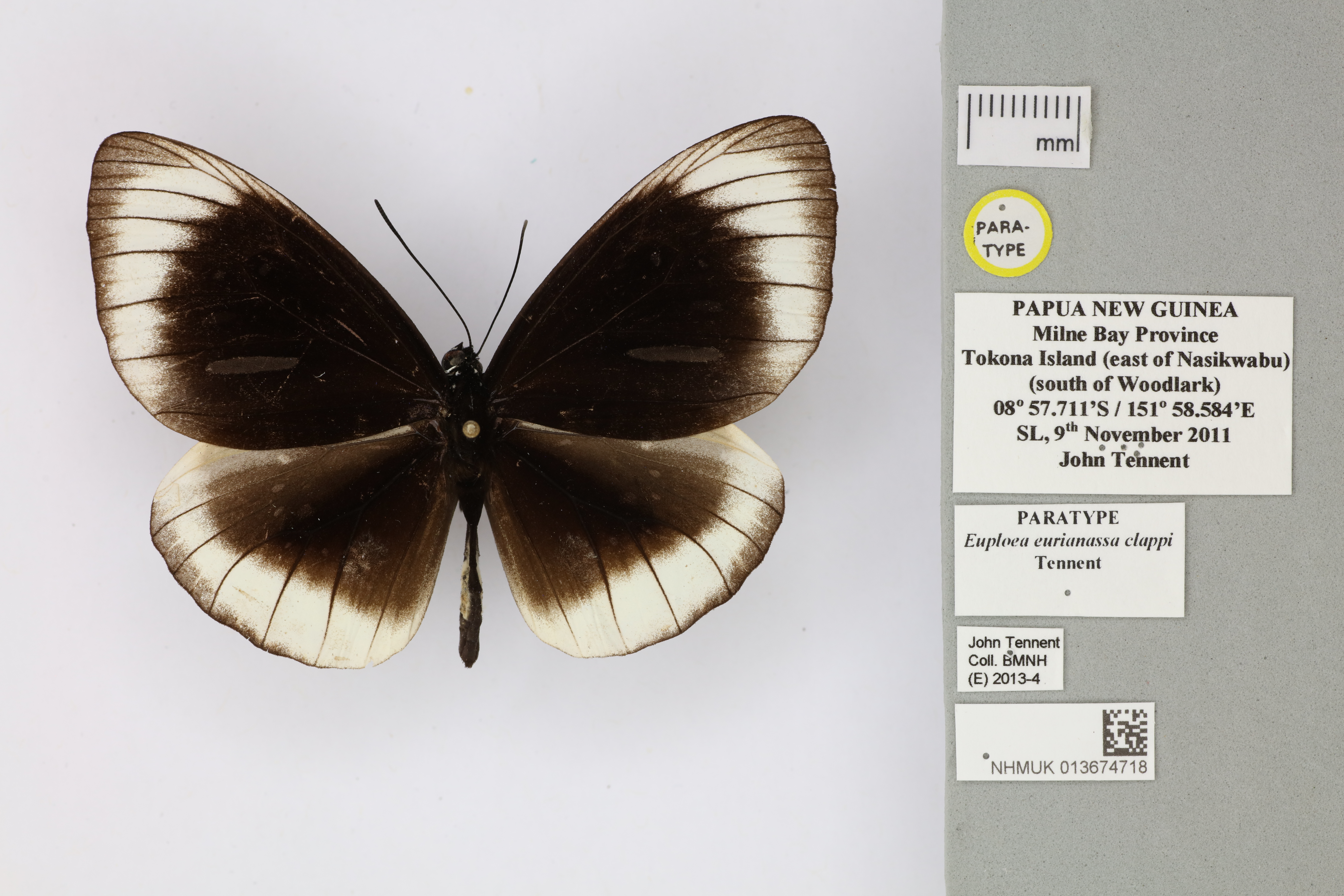

Scientific classification
- Kingdom: Animalia
- Phylum: Arthropoda
- Clade: Pancrustacea
- Class: Insecta
- Order: Lepidoptera
- Family: Nymphalidae
- Genus: Euploea
- Species: E. eurianassa

Binomial name
- Euploea eurianassa Hewitson 1858

Synonyms
- cumaxa Fruhstorfer, 1910; terentilia Fruhstorfer, 1910; Penoa thomsoni Kirby, 1889

= Euploea eurianassa =

Species of butterfly

Euploea eurianassa is a butterfly in the family Nymphalidae. It was described by William Chapman Hewitson in 1858. It is endemic to New Guinea in the Australasian realm.

The larva feeds on Ichnocarpus frutescens.
