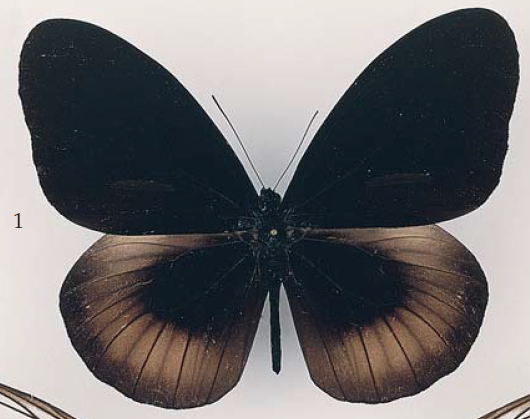
- a male specimen

Conservation status
- Vulnerable (IUCN 2.3)

Scientific classification
- Kingdom: Animalia
- Phylum: Arthropoda
- Clade: Pancrustacea
- Class: Insecta
- Order: Lepidoptera
- Family: Nymphalidae
- Genus: Euploea
- Species: E. magou

Binomial name
- Euploea magou

= Magou =

Species of butterfly

The Magou Crow (Euploea magou) is a species of nymphalid butterfly in the Danainae subfamily. It is endemic to Indonesia (Sulawesi).
