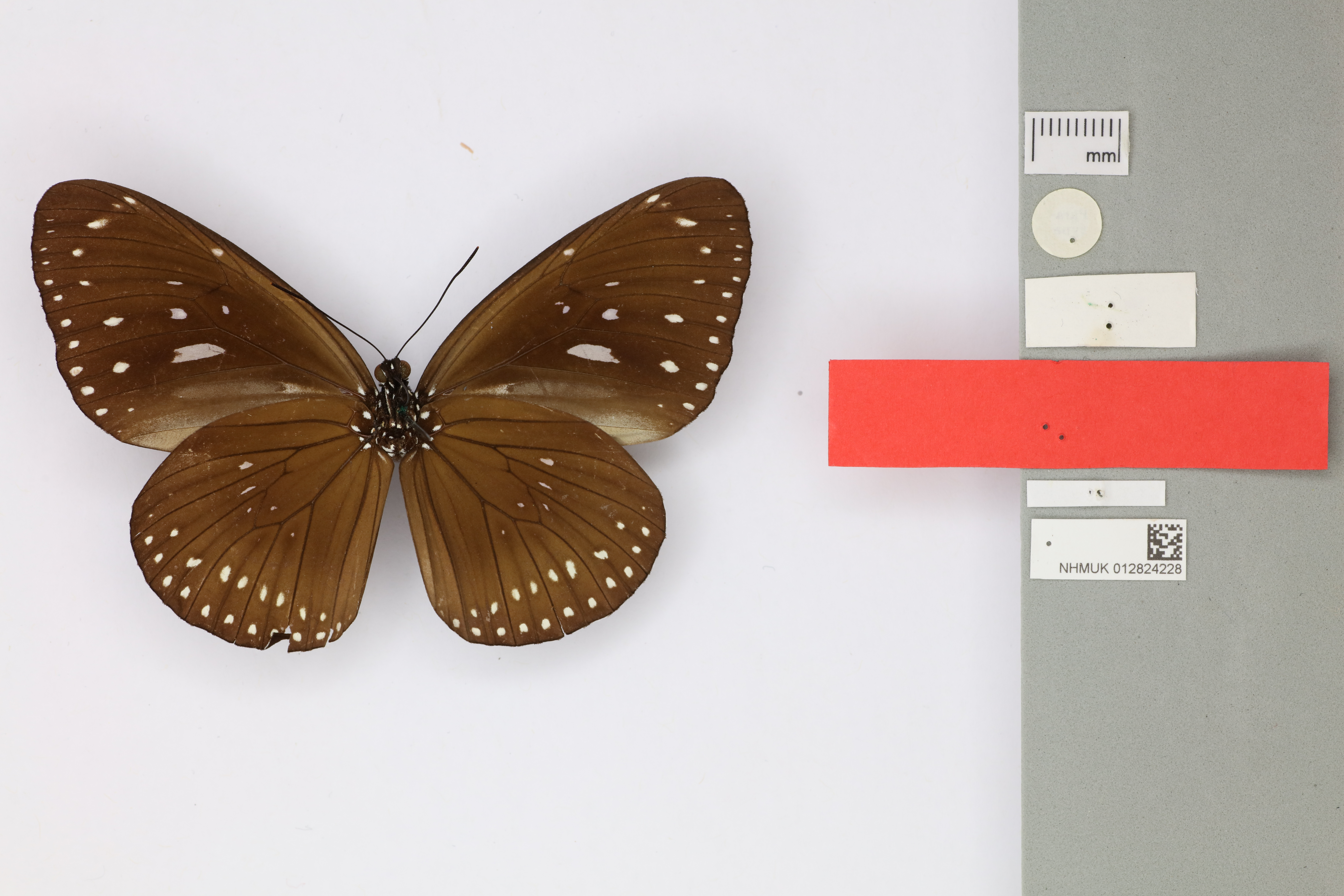

Conservation status
- Near Threatened (IUCN 2.3)

Scientific classification
- Kingdom: Animalia
- Phylum: Arthropoda
- Clade: Pancrustacea
- Class: Insecta
- Order: Lepidoptera
- Family: Nymphalidae
- Genus: Euploea
- Species: E. swainson

Binomial name
- Euploea swainson (Godart, 1824)

= Swainson's crow =

Species of butterfly

The Swainson's crow (Euploea swainson) is a species of nymphalid butterfly in the Danainae subfamily. It is found in Indonesia and the Philippines.
