= Spartan crow =

Conservation status
- Vulnerable (IUCN 2.3)

Scientific classification
- Kingdom: Animalia
- Phylum: Arthropoda
- Clade: Pancrustacea
- Class: Insecta
- Order: Lepidoptera
- Family: Nymphalidae
- Genus: Euploea
- Species: E. lacon

Binomial name
- Euploea lacon (Grose-Smith, 1894)

Species of butterfly

The Spartan crow (Euploea lacon) is a species of nymphalid butterfly in the Danainae subfamily. It is endemic to Papua New Guinea.
