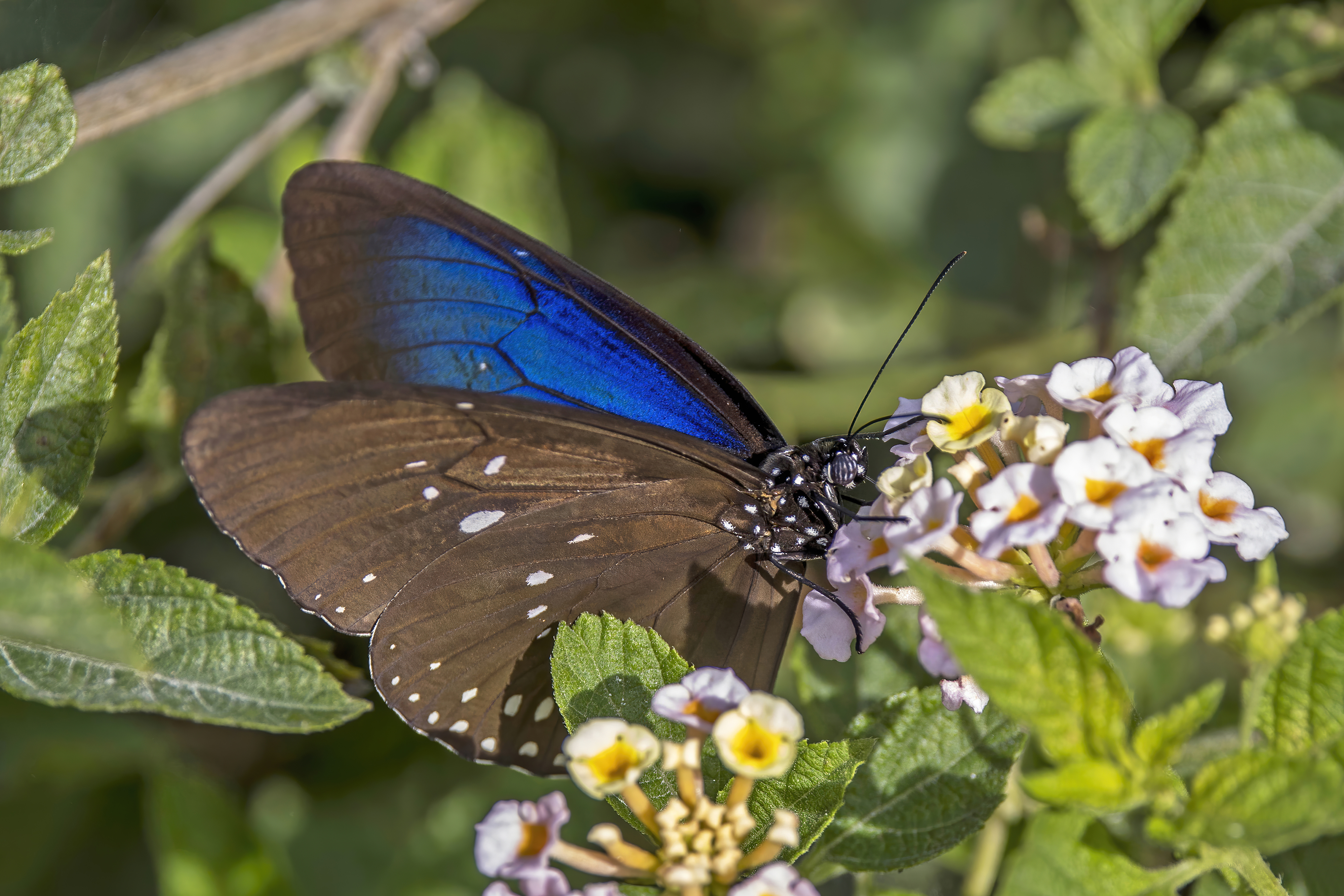

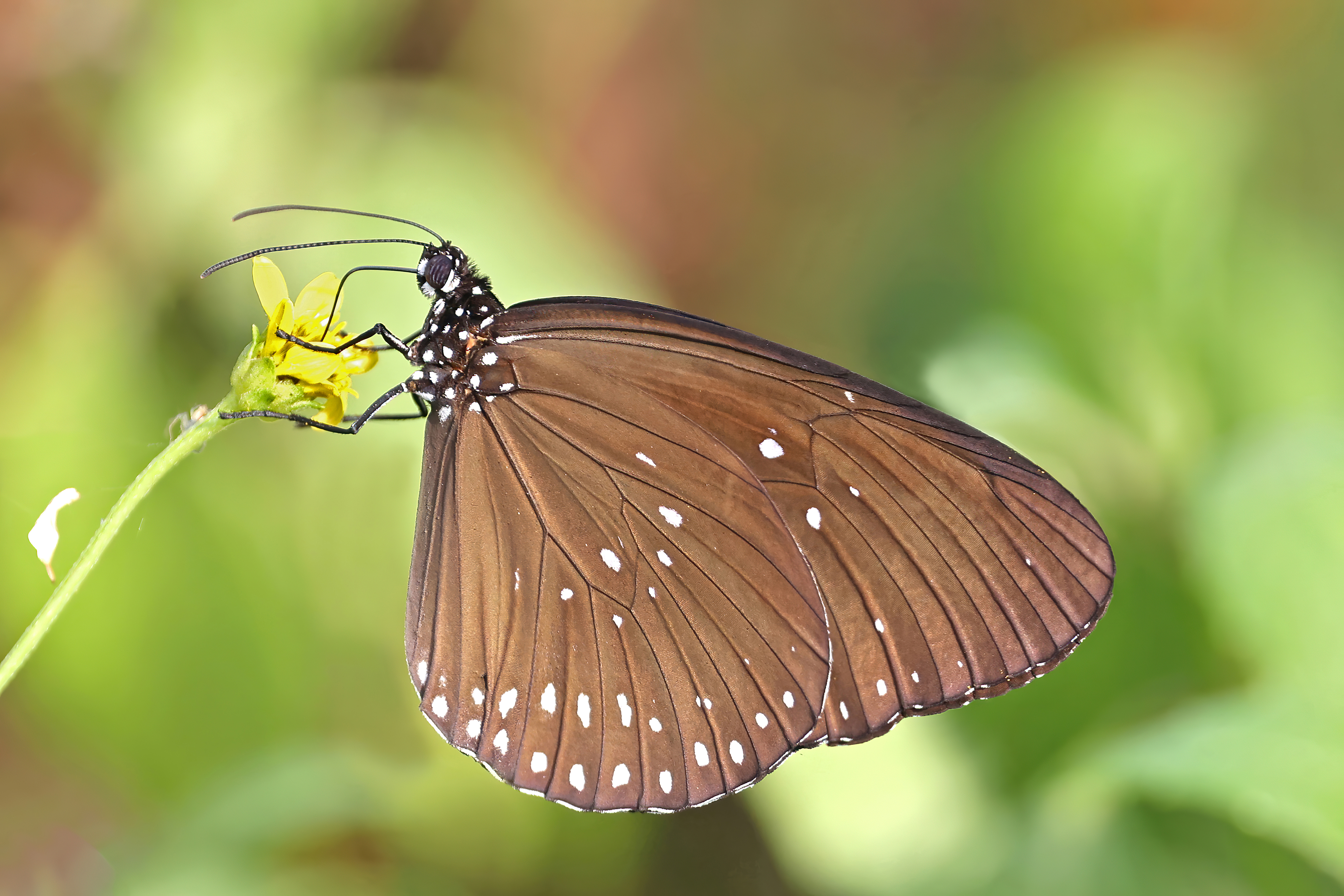
- both E. m. modesta Phi Phi, Thailand

Scientific classification
- Kingdom: Animalia
- Phylum: Arthropoda
- Clade: Pancrustacea
- Class: Insecta
- Order: Lepidoptera
- Family: Nymphalidae
- Genus: Euploea
- Species: E. modesta

Binomial name
- Euploea modesta Butler, 1866

Synonyms
- Euploea moorei Butler, 1866; Crastia cupreipennis Moore, [1879]; Menama tavoyana Moore, 1883; Menama mouhotii Moore, 1883; Tronga brookei Moore, 1883; Euploea (Tronga) morrisi Hagen, 1898; Tronga morrisi Hagen, 1902; Euploea (Menama) moorei thiemei Fruhstorfer, 1904; subpunctata Fruhstorfer, 1910; Euploea moorei anambalis van Eecke, 1915; Euploea deheeri crumena van Eecke, 1915; ainoae Bryk, 1937; griseitincta Carpenter, 1942; Menama tavoyana Elwes & de Nicéville, 1887; Euploea lugens Butler, 1876; Oranasma smithii Moore, 1883; Crastia cerberus Butler, 1882; Euploea buxtoni Moore, 1883; Menama lorzae Moore, 1883; Euploea deheerii Doherty, 1891; Euploea kühni Röber, 1891; Euploea (Patosa) obscura Pagenstecher, 1894; Euploea (Menama) suavissima Fruhstorfer, 1897; Euploea (Menama) deheeri salinator Fruhstorfer, 1904; Euploea (Menama) de heeri lamos Fruhstorfer, 1904; Euploea werneri Fruhstorfer, 1909; Euploea alecto misagenes Fruhstorfer, 1910; Euploea insulicola Strand, 1914; Euploea incerta Joicey & Noakes, 1915; Euploea tiomana Corbet, 1937; Euploea jennessi Carpenter, 1941

= Euploea modesta =

Species of butterfly

Euploea modesta, the plain blue crow, is a butterfly in the family Nymphalidae. It was described by Arthur Gardiner Butler in 1866. It is found in the Indomalayan realm and the Australasian realm.

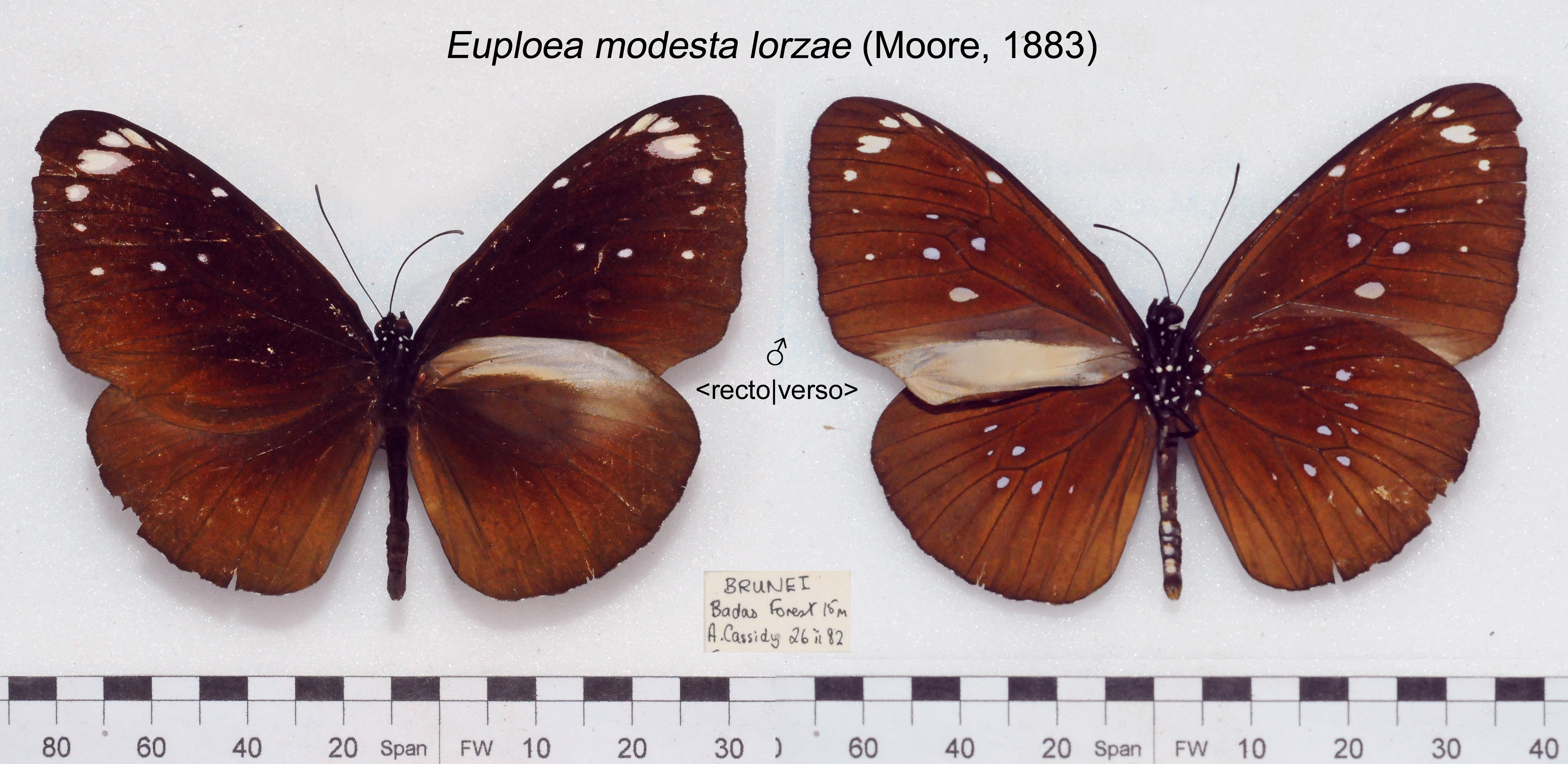
E. m. lorzae

== Subspecies ==
- E. m. modesta (India to Thailand, Vietnam, Peninsular Malaysia, Indo-China)
- E. m. lugens Butler, 1876 (Papua, East New Guinea)
- E. m. cerberus (Butler, 1882) (East New Guinea - Bismarck Archipelago, Biak)
- E. m. buxtoni (Moore, 1883) (Sumatra)
- E. m. lorzae (Moore, 1883) (Borneo)
- E. m. deheeri (Doherty, 1891) (Sumbawa)
- E. m. kuehni Röber, 1891 (Flores)
- E. m. obscura Pagenstecher, 1894 (Bismarck Archipelago)
- E. m. suavissima Fruhstorfer, 1897 (Lombok)
- E. m. salinator Fruhstorfer, 1904 (Alor)
- E. m. lamos Fruhstorfer, 1904 (East Java)
- E. m. werneri Fruhstorfer, 1909 (Manam Island)
- E. m. misagenes Fruhstorfer, 1910 (Karkar Island)
- E. m. deriopes Fruhstorfer, 1911 (Hainan)
- E. m. insulicola Strand, 1914 (Admiralty Islands)
- E. m. incerta Joicey & Noakes, 1915 (Biak)
- E. m. tiomana Corbet, 1937 (Pulau Tioman)
- E. m. jennessi Carpenter, 1941 (Goodenough Island)
