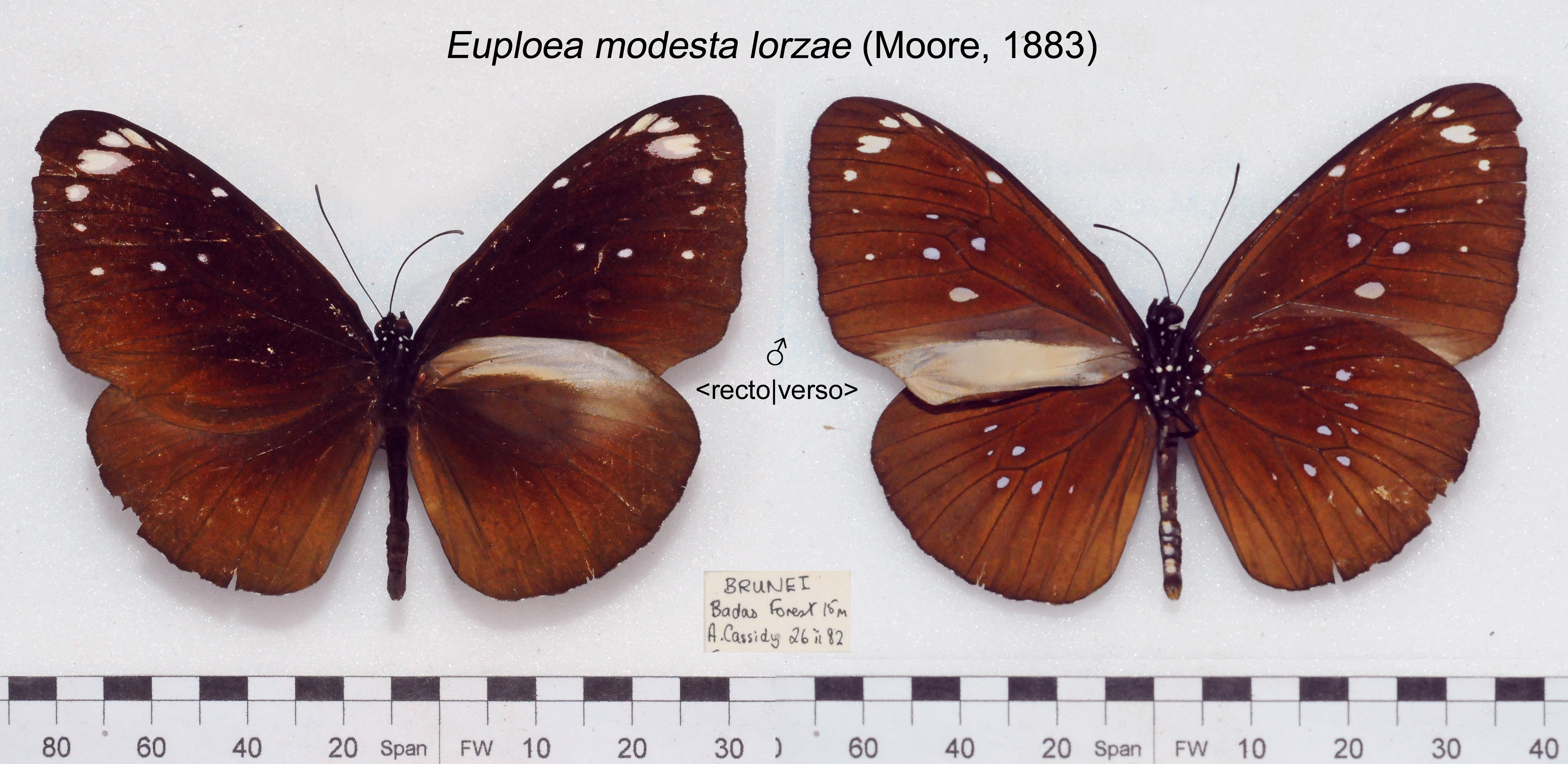
- Euploea redtenbacheri coracina

Scientific classification
- Kingdom: Animalia
- Phylum: Arthropoda
- Clade: Pancrustacea
- Class: Insecta
- Order: Lepidoptera
- Family: Nymphalidae
- Genus: Euploea
- Species: E. redtenbacheri

Binomial name
- Euploea redtenbacheri Felder C. & Felder R., 1865

Synonyms
- Gamatoba dromius Grose-Smith, 1895; Euploea (Gamatoba) spiculifera praxithea Fruhstorfer, 1904; Papilio dryasis Fabricius, 1793; Euploea leachi C. & R. Felder, [1865]; Euploea coracina Hopffer, 1874; Gamatoba spiculifera Moore, 1883; Euploea spiculifera pydna Fruhstorfer, 1904; Sarobia leachi albiplaga Fruhstorfer, 1899; albiplagiata Fruhstorfer, 1910

= Euploea redtenbacheri =

Species of butterfly

Euploea redtenbacheri, the Malayan crow or Redtenbacher's crow, is a butterfly in the family Nymphalidae. It was described by Cajetan Felder and Rudolf Felder in 1865. It is found in the Indomalayan realm and the Australasian realm.

== Subspecies ==
- E. r. redtenbacheri (Sulawesi, Burma, Malaya, Celebes, Moluccas)
- E. r. leachii C. & R. Felder, [1865] (South Sulawesi)
- E. r. coracina Hopffer, 1874 (North Sulawesi, Central Sulawesi)
- E. r. spiculifera (Moore, 1883) (Buru, Ambon, Obi)
- E. r. albiplaga (Fruhstorfer, 1899) (Banggai Island)
- E. r. selayarensis Tsukada & Nishiyama, 1979 (Salayar)

== Biology ==
The larva feeds on Strophanthus dichotomus.

== Etymology ==
The name honours Ludwig Redtenbacher.
