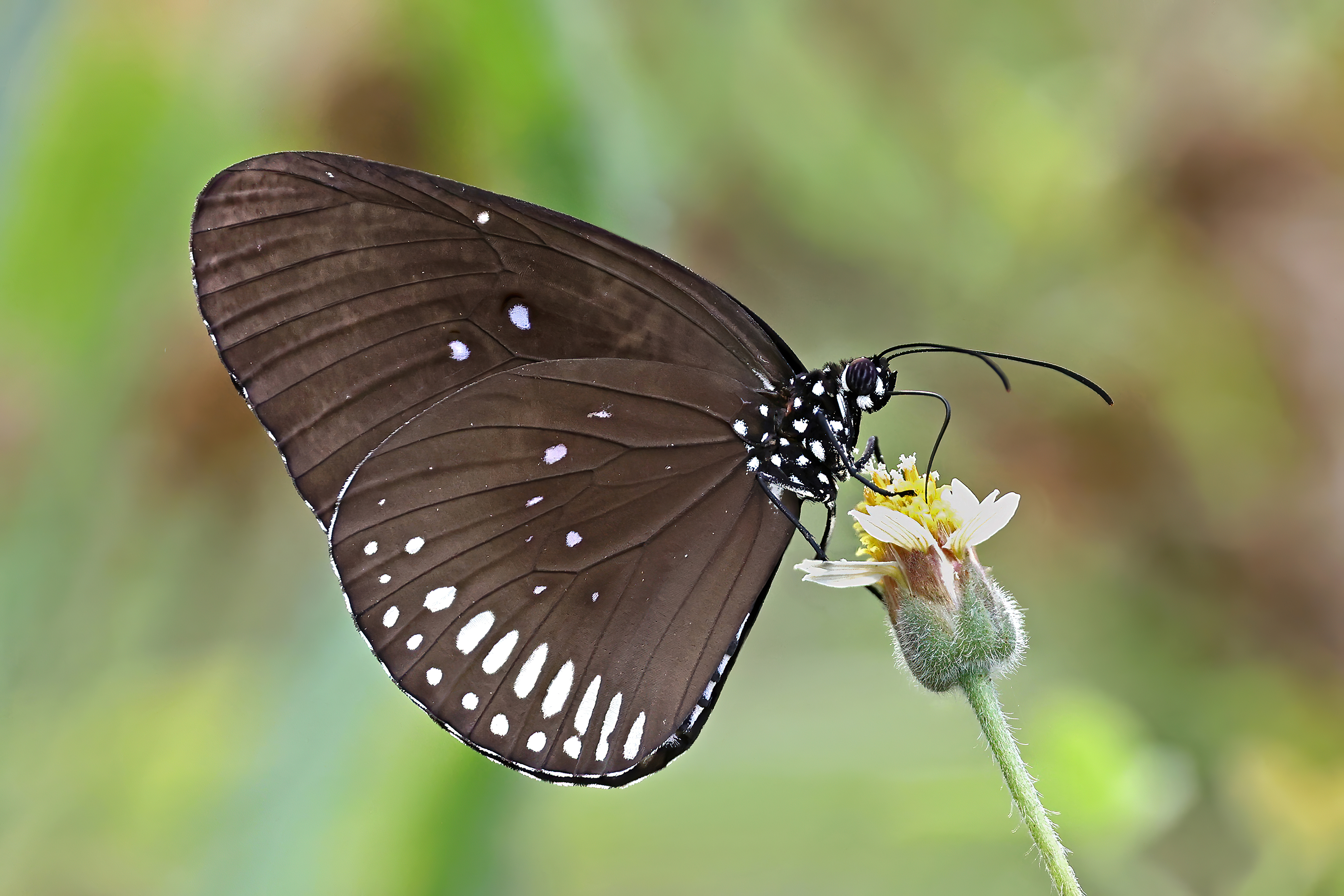
- Long-branded blue crow (E. algea menetriesii), Phi Phi, Thailand
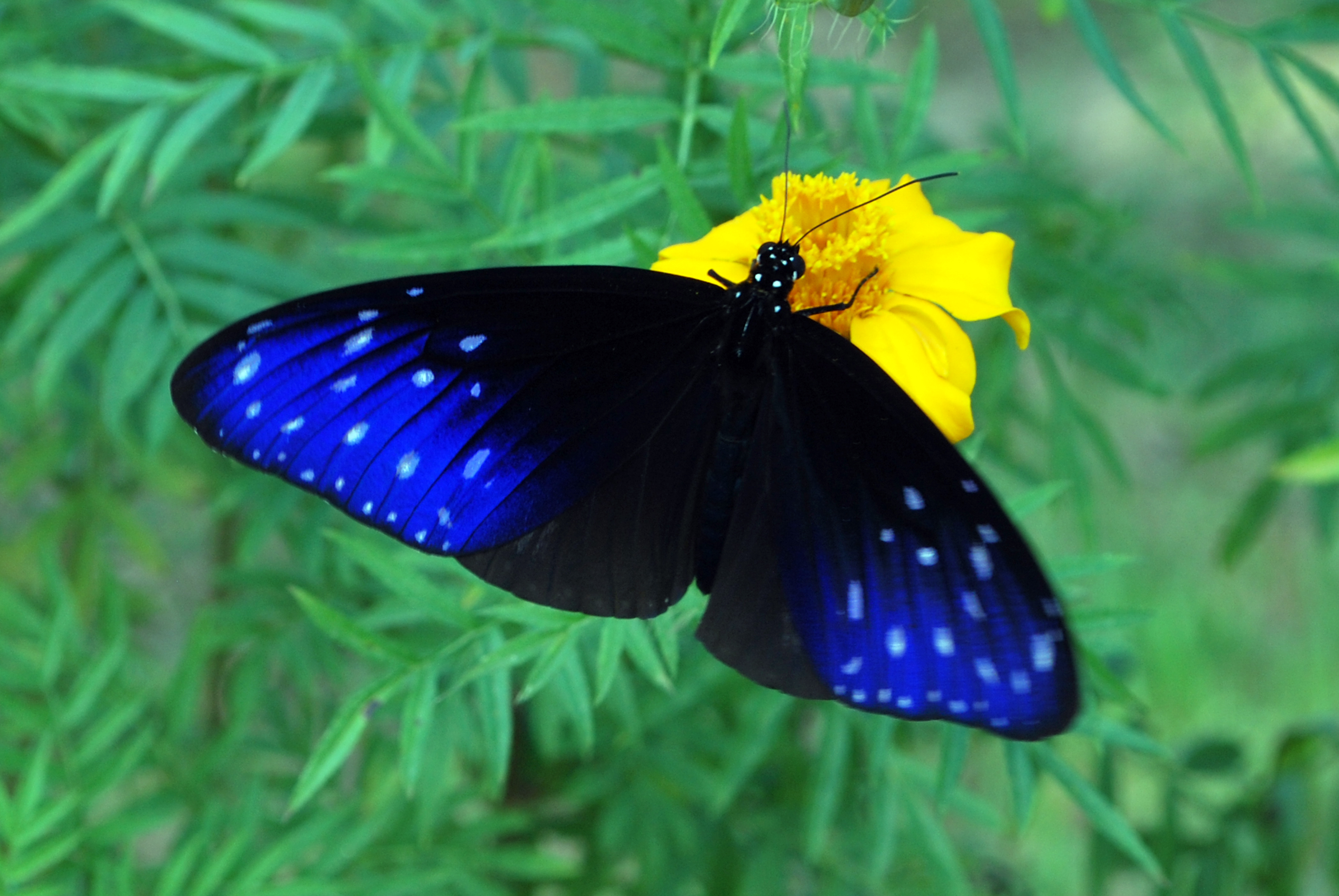
- Euploea mulciber showing structural blue colour

Scientific classification
- Kingdom: Animalia
- Phylum: Arthropoda
- Clade: Pancrustacea
- Class: Insecta
- Order: Lepidoptera
- Family: Nymphalidae
- Subfamily: Danainae
- Tribe: Danaini
- Subtribe: Euploeina
- Genus: Euploea; Fabricius, 1807

Type species
- Papilio corus Fabricius, 1793

Synonyms
- Anadara Moore, 1883; Doricha Moore, 1883

= Euploea =

Genus of brush-footed butterflies

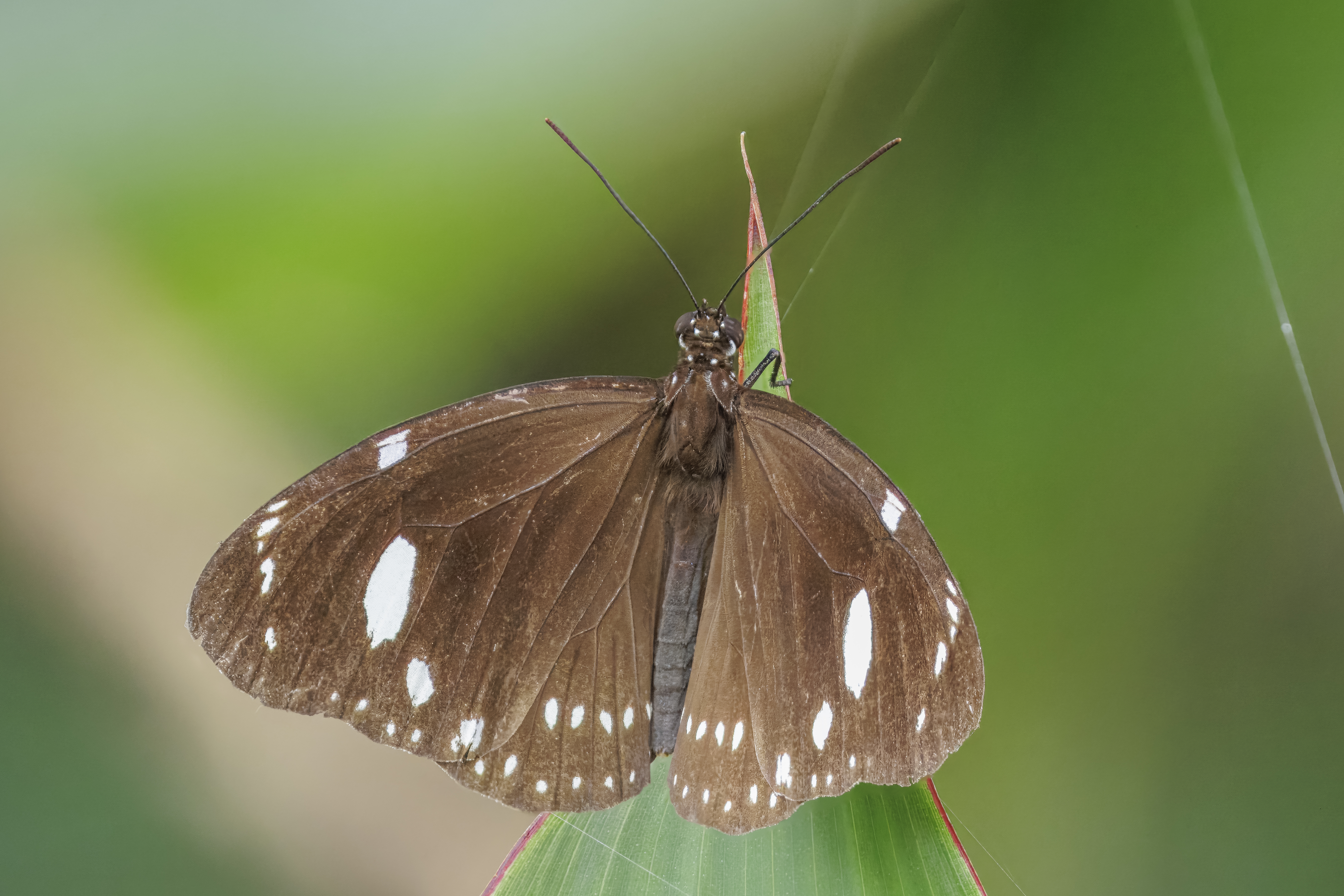
E. lewinii eschscholtzii, Fiji

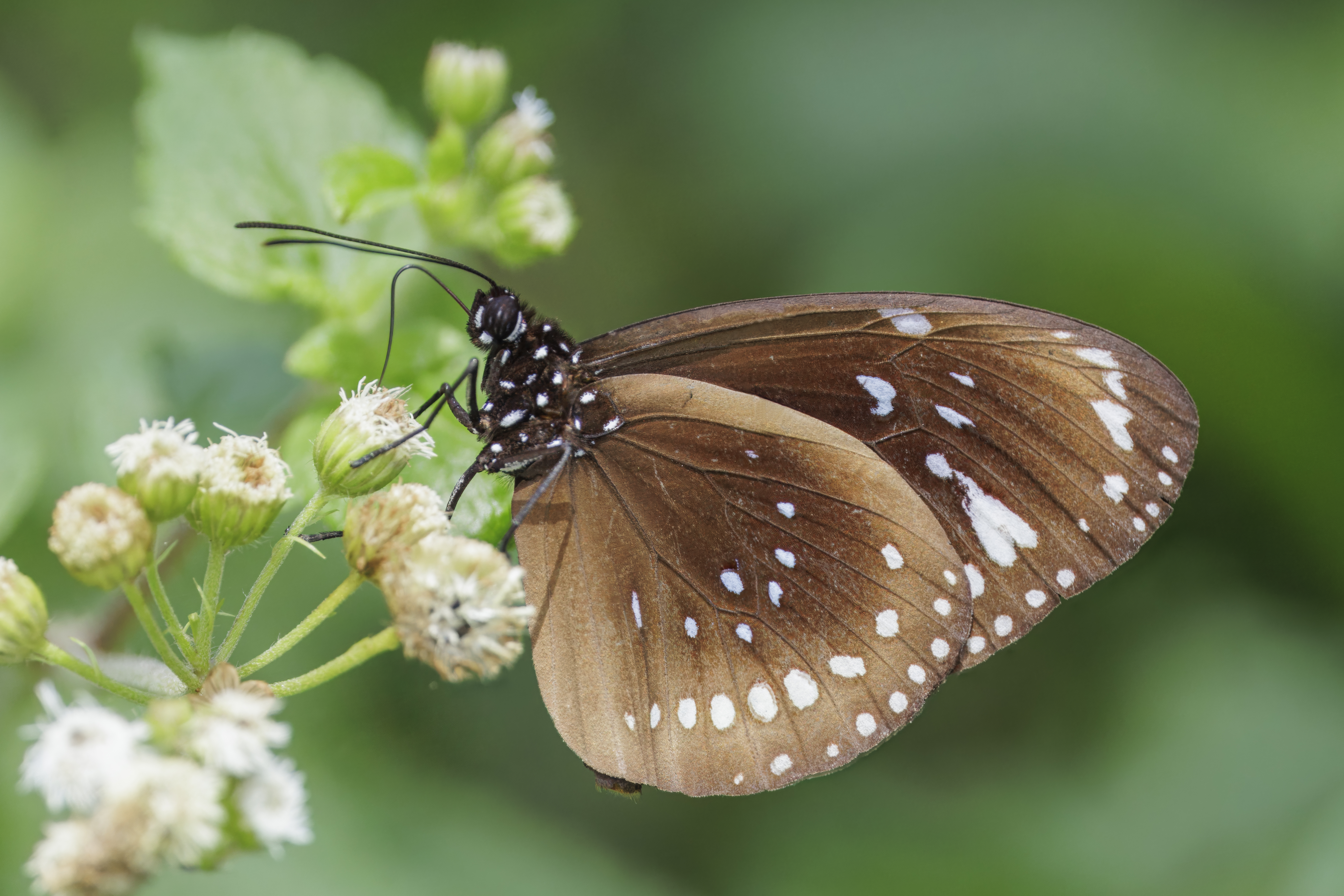
E. lewinii eschscholtzii, Fiji

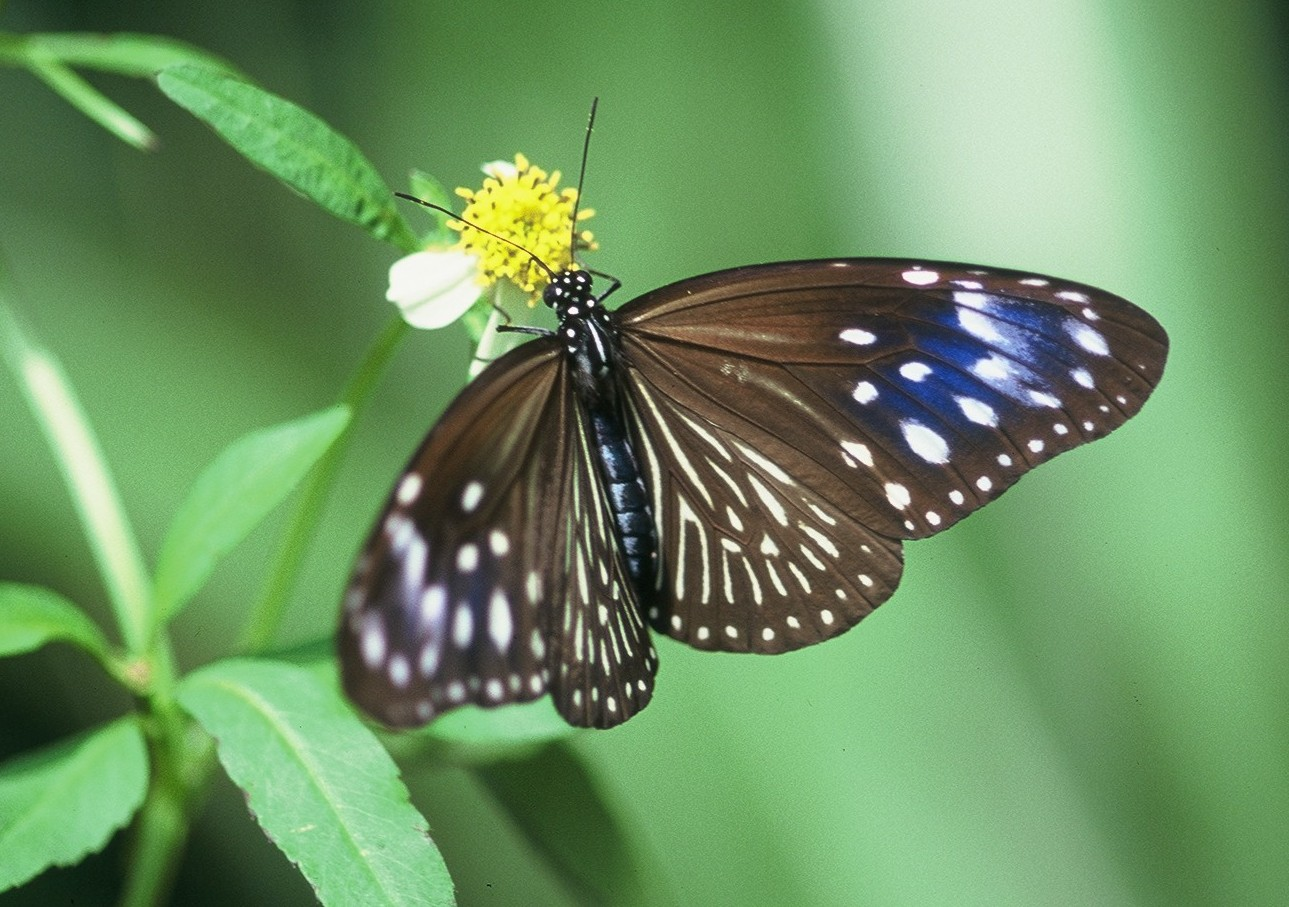
Striped blue crow (Euploea mulciber), ♀ Ishigaki Is., Japan

Euploea is a genus of milkweed butterflies. The species are generally dark in colouration, often quite blackish, for which reason they are commonly called crows. As usual for their subfamily, they are poisonous due to feeding on milkweeds and other toxic plants as caterpillars. The latter are aposematically colored to warn off predators from eating them, and the adult butterflies are often mimicked by unrelated species which are not or less poisonous.They are medium to large butterflies with a slender body and large, relatively narrow wings. The body is black with white spots.The typical butterfly wing colouring is dark blue, dark brown, or black often with white spots and ray-like stripes in the outer part.In some species the blue is or violet is shimmering metallic (structural as in Morpho and Arhopala) Caterpillars, on the other hand, are brightly coloured.

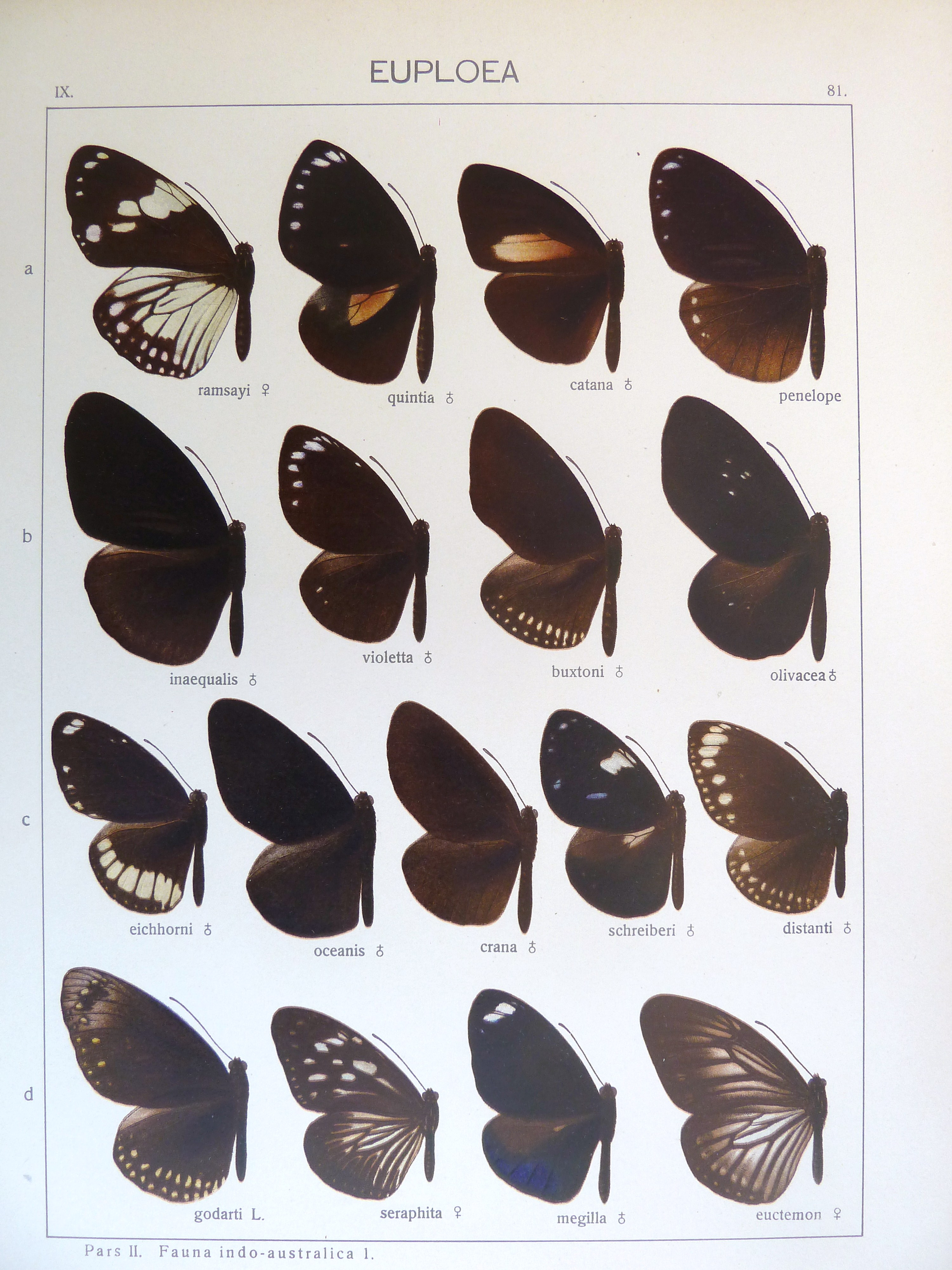

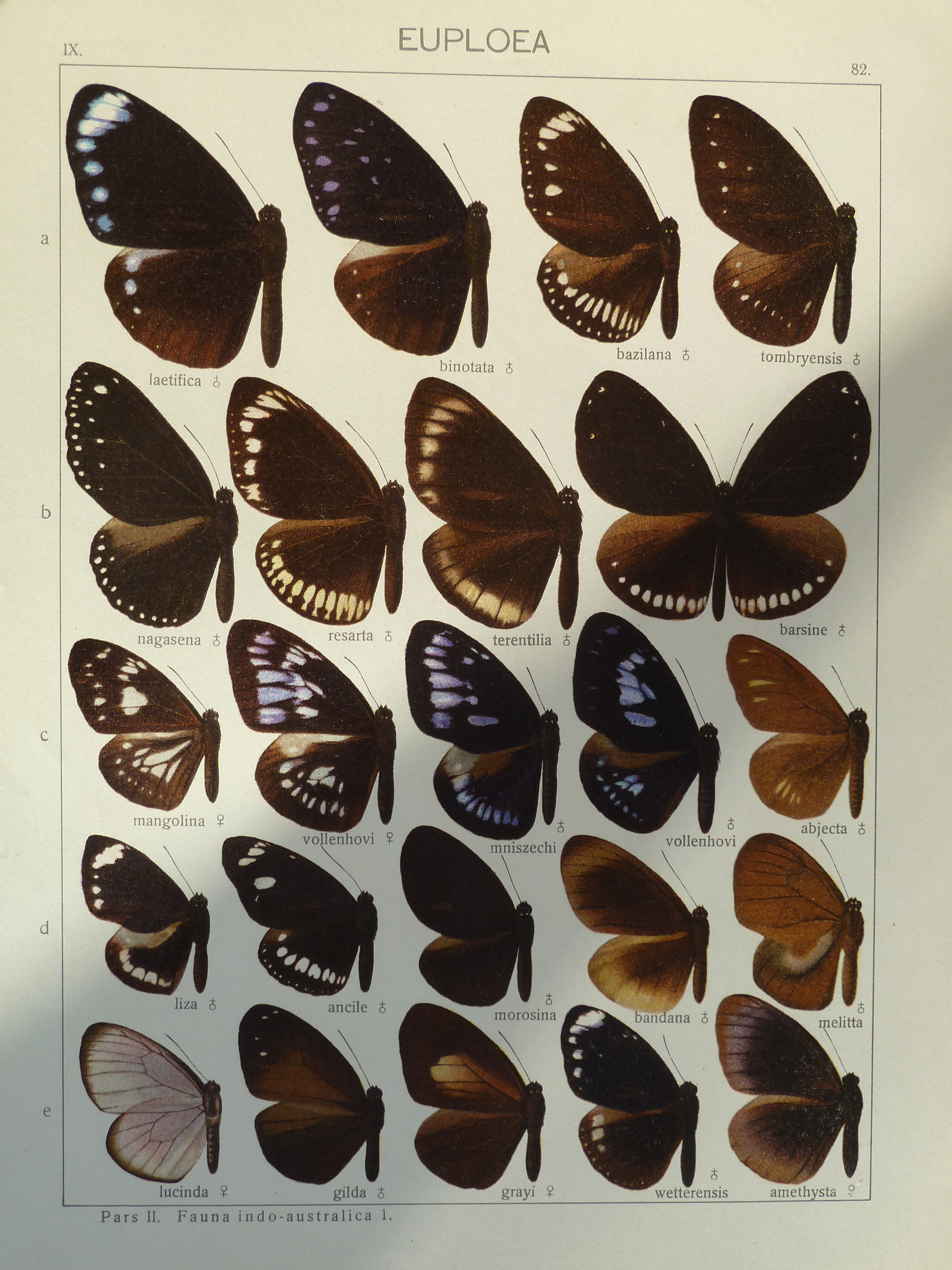

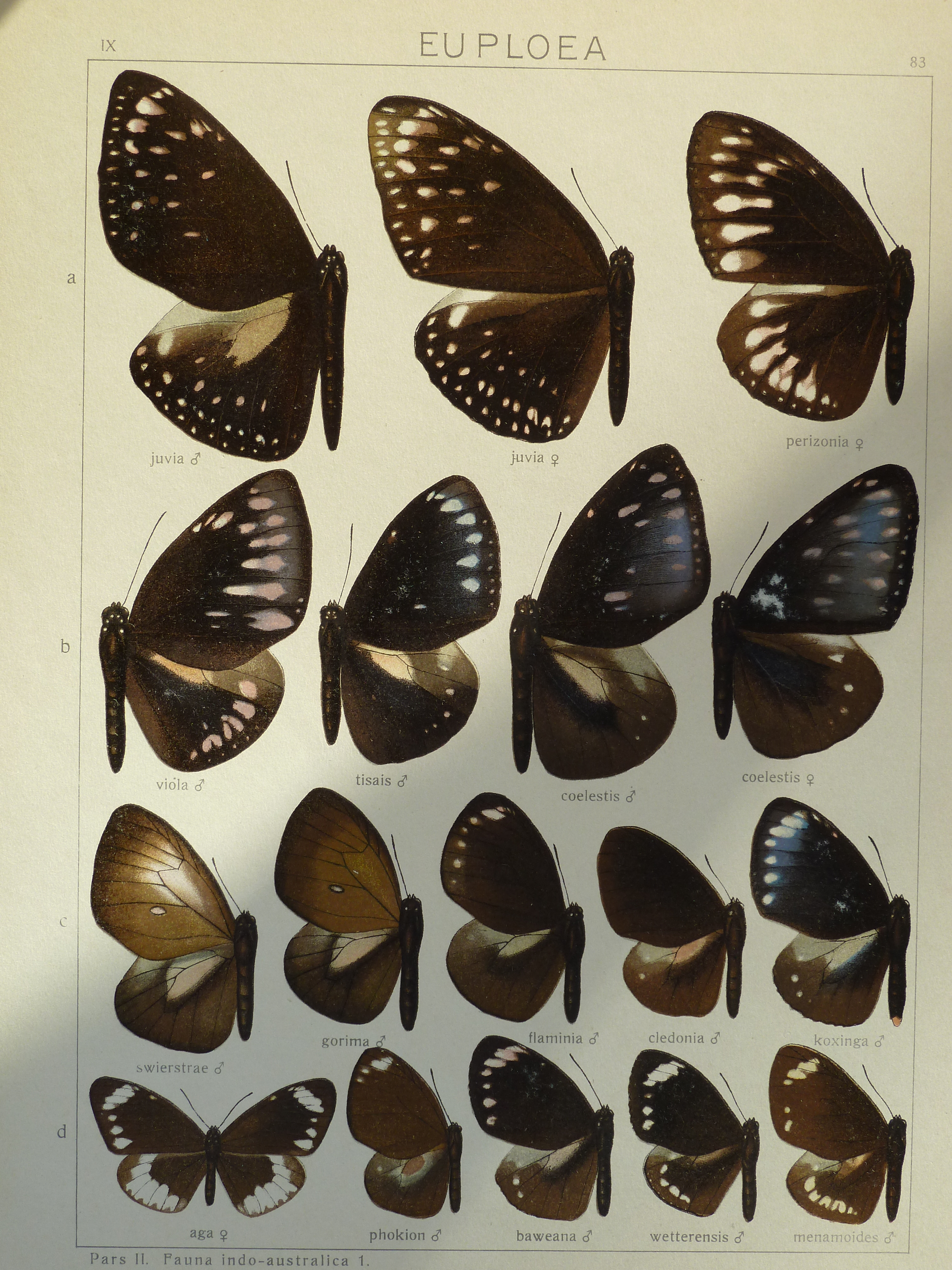

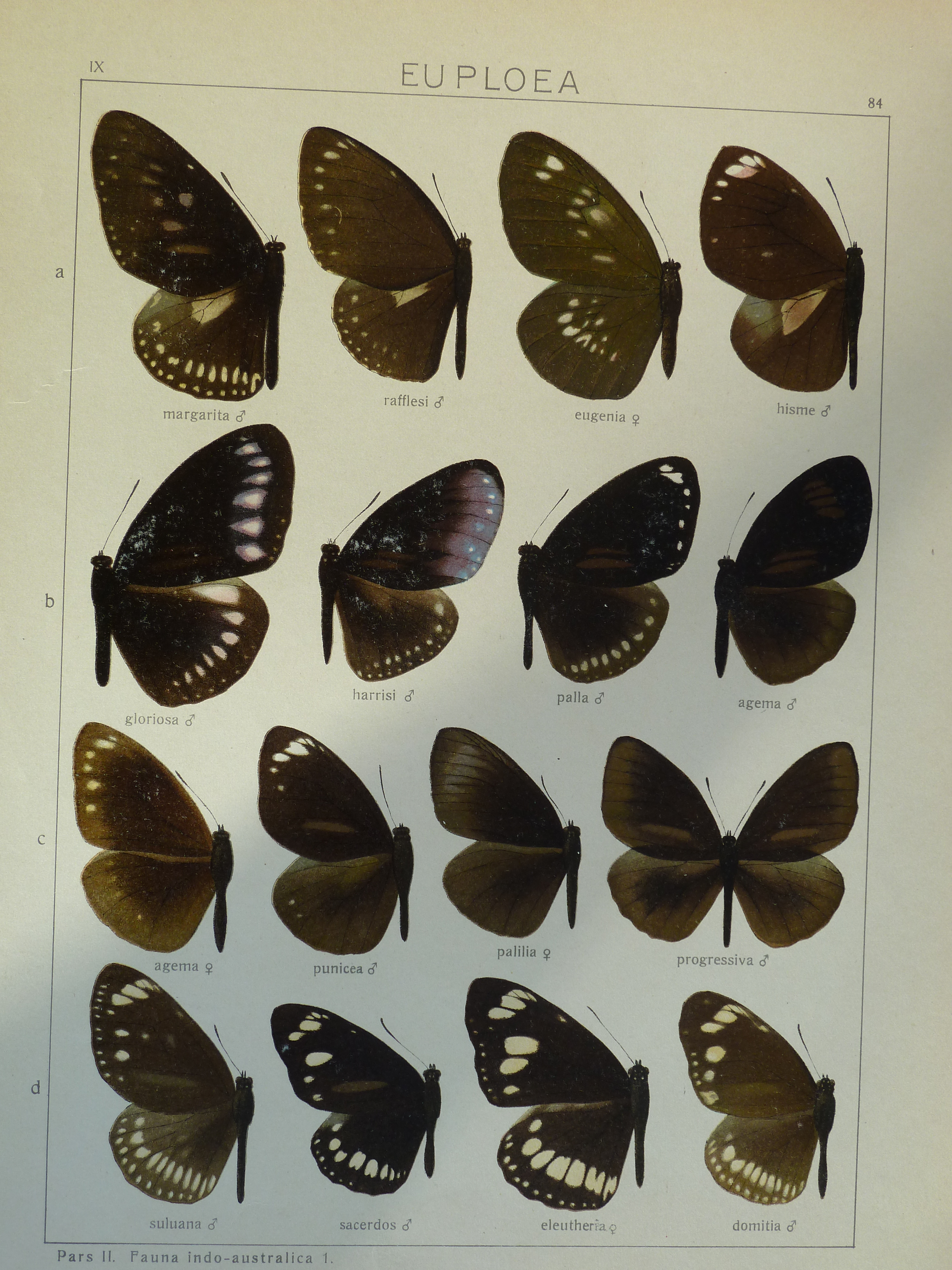

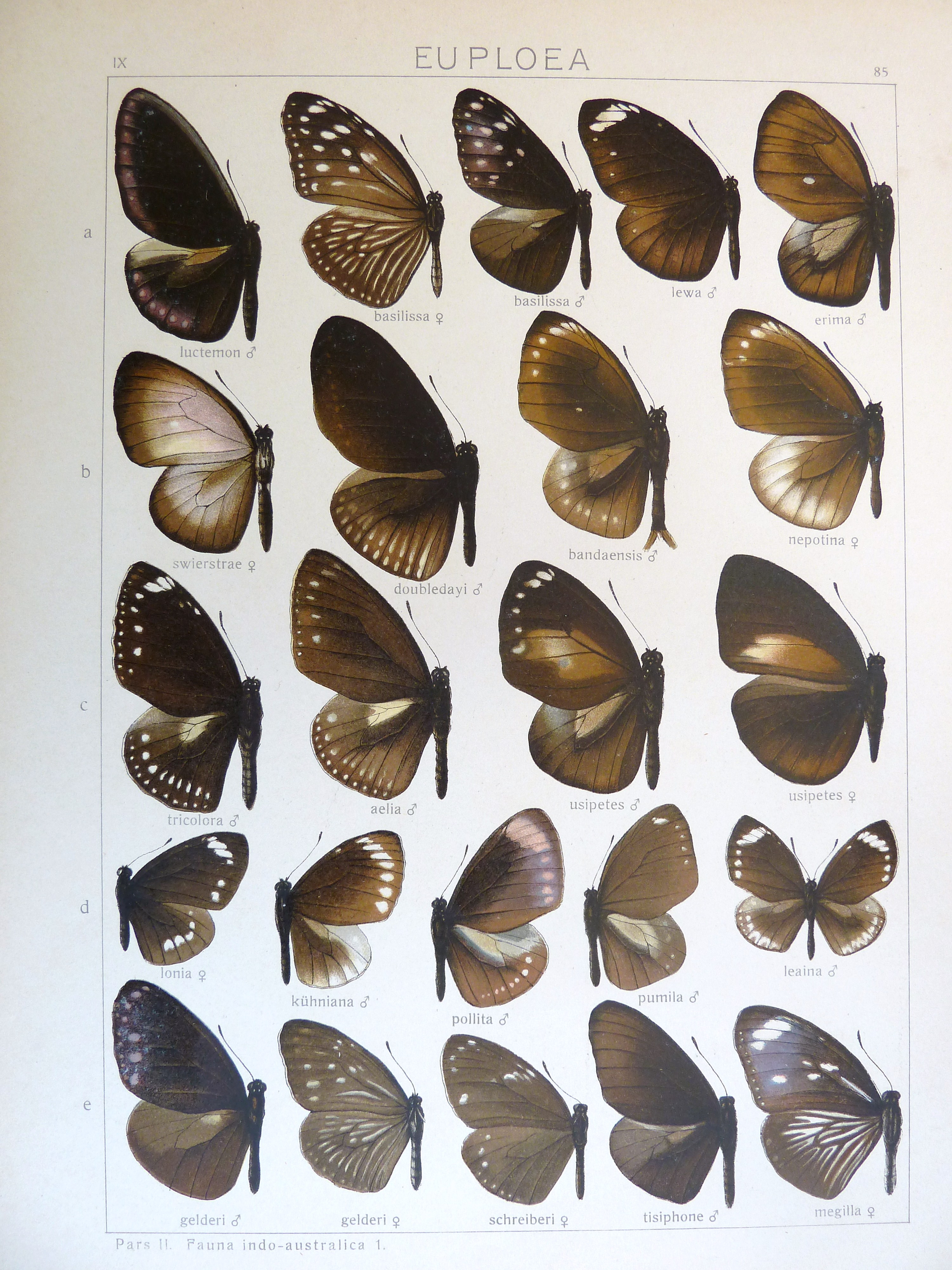

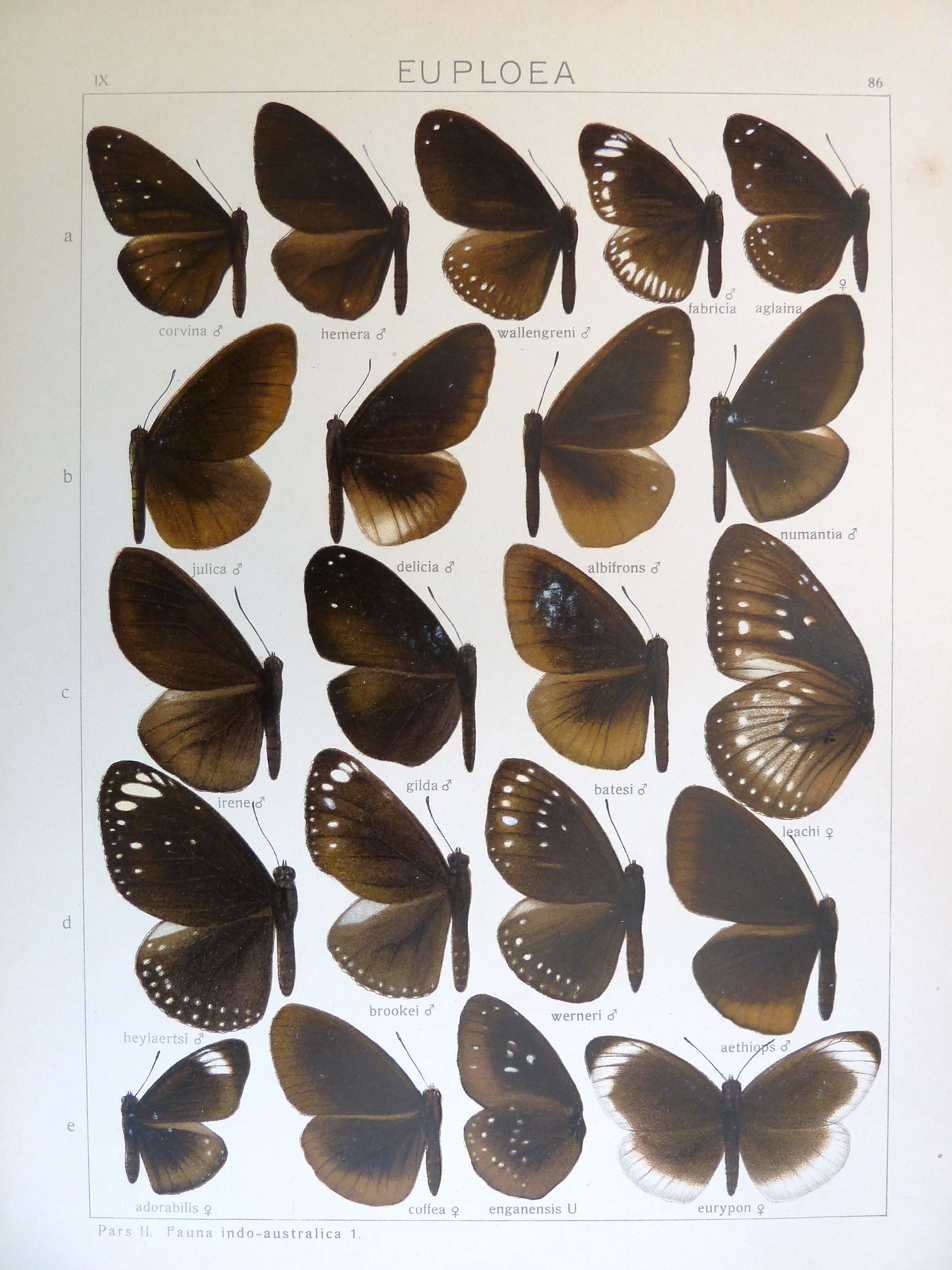

== Species ==
Listed alphabetically.

- Euploea albicosta – Biak dark crow
- Euploea alcathoe – no-brand crow, striped black crow
  - Euploea alcathoe enastri – Gove crow
- Euploea algea – long-branded blue crow, mournful crow, Algea crow
- Euploea andamanensis – Andaman crow
- Euploea asyllus
- Euploea batesii
- Euploea blossomae – Schaus's crow
- Euploea boisduvali
- Euploea caespes – Murphy's crow
- Euploea camaralzeman – Malayan crow
- Euploea climena
- Euploea configurata – Sulawesi striped blue crow
- Euploea cordelia – Cordelia crow
- Euploea core – common crow
- Euploea corinna – Australian common crow
- Euploea crameri – spotted black crow
- Euploea darchia – small brown crow
- Euploea dentiplaga – Seram crow
- Euploea desjardinsii
- Euploea doretta – Pagenstecher's crow
- Euploea doubledayi – striped black crow
- Euploea eboraci – Bismark crow
- Euploea eleusina – Vollenhov's crow
- Euploea eunice – blue-banded king crow
- Euploea eupator – Vanoort's crow
- Euploea euphon – Mascarene crow
- Euploea eurianassa
- Euploea eyndhovii
- Euploea gamelia – Javan crow
- Euploea goudotii
- Euploea hewitsonii – Hewitson's dwarf crow
- Euploea klugii – blue king crow
- Euploea lacon – Spartan crow
- Euploea latifasciata – Weymer's crow, broad-banded crow
- Euploea leucostictos – orange-flash crow
- Euploea lewinii
- Euploea magou – magou crow
- Euploea martinii – Sumatran crow
- Euploea midamus – blue spotted crow
- Euploea mitra – Seychelles crow
- Euploea modesta
- Euploea morosa
- Euploea mulciber – striped blue crow
- Euploea nechos
- Euploea netscheri
- Euploea orontobates

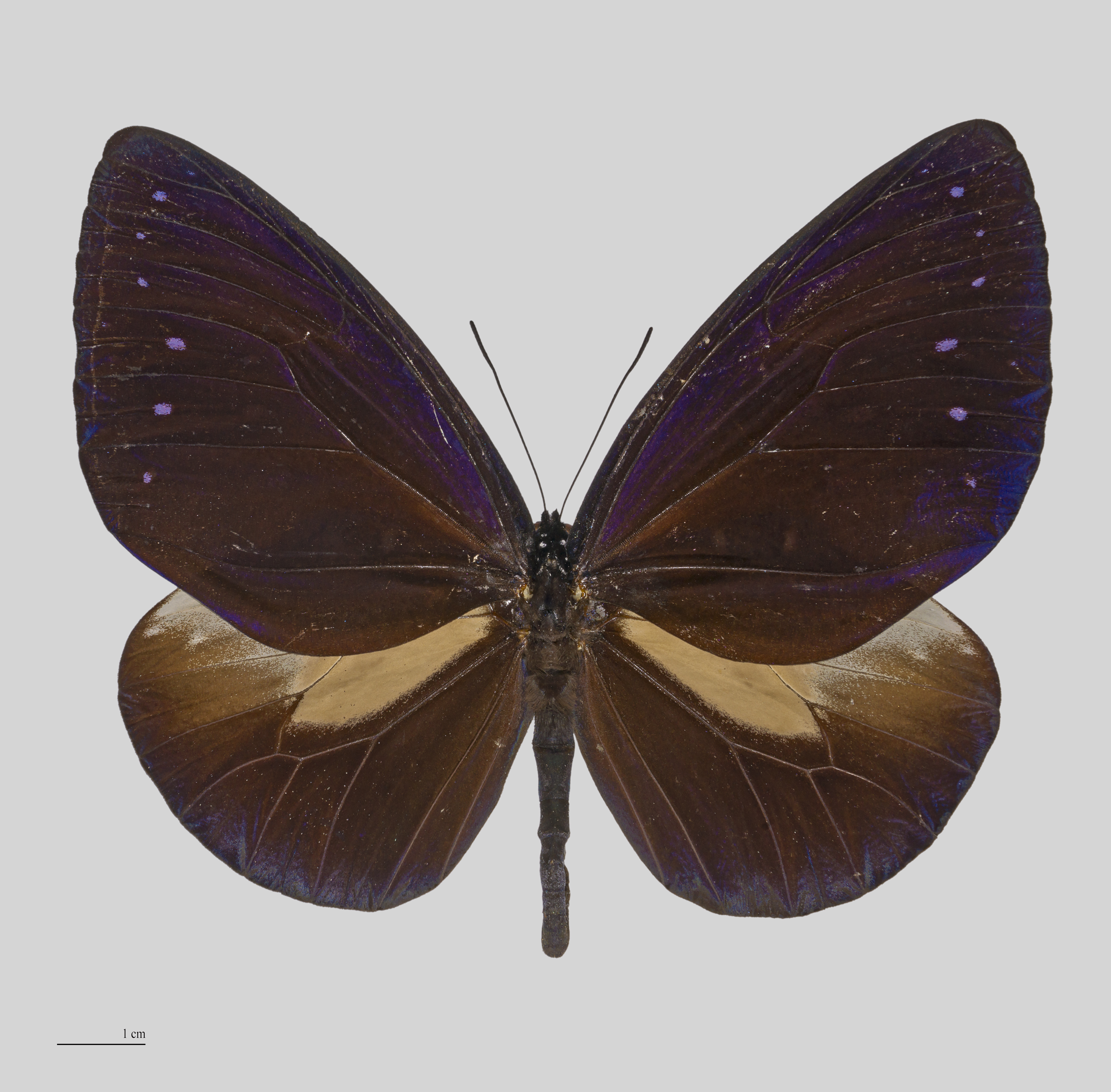
Euploea phaenareta hollandi

- Euploea phaenareta – great crow, large crow
  - Euploea phaenareta juvia – Taiwan or juvia large crow, extinct (1960s)
- Euploea radamanthus – magpie crow
- Euploea redtenbacheri – Malayan crow, Redtenbacher's crow
- ?Euploea rogeri – Roger's monarch
- Euploea stephensii
- Euploea swainson – Swainson's crow
- Euploea sylvester – double-branded crow
- Euploea tobleri – Tobler's crow
- Euploea transfixa
- Euploea treitschkei
- Euploea tripunctata – Biak threespot crow
- Euploea tulliolus – eastern brown crow, dwarf crow
- Euploea usipetes
- Euploea wallacei
- Euploea westwoodii – Westwood's king crow

== Nomenclature ==
This genus has a large number of junior synonyms, due in part to Moore committing what probably ranks as one of the most drastic cases of oversplitting in the history of zoology:

Crastia Hübner, 1816
Trepsichrois Hübner, 1816
Salpinx Hübner, 1819
Eudaemon Billberg, 1820
Terpsichrois Hübner, 1821 (lapsus)
Euplaea Boisduval, 1832 (lapsus)
Calliploea Butler, 1875
Macroploea Butler, 1878
Stictoploea Butler, 1878
Euplea W.F. Kirby, 1879 (lapsus)
Adigama Moore, 1880
Andasena Moore, 1883
Betanga Moore, 1883
Bibisana Moore, 1883
Chanapa Moore, 1883
Chirosa Moore, 1883
Danisepa Moore, 1883
Deragena Moore, 1883
Gamatoba Moore, 1883
Glinama Moore, 1883
Hirdapa Moore, 1883
Isamia Moore, 1883
Karadira Moore, 1883
Lontara Moore, 1883
Mahintha Moore, 1883
Menama Moore, 1883
Mestapra Moore, 1883
Nacamsa Moore, 1883
Narmada Moore, 1880
Nipara Moore, 1883
Oranasma Moore, 1883
Pademma Moore, 1883
Patosa Moore, 1883
Penoa Moore, 1883
Pramasa Moore, 1883
Pramesta Moore, 1883
Rasuma Moore, 1883
Sabanosa Moore, 1883
Saphara Moore, 1883
Sarobia Moore, 1883
Satanga Moore, 1883
Selinda Moore, 1883
Tabada Moore, 1883
Tagata Moore, 1883
Tiruna Moore, 1883
Tronga Moore, 1883
Vadebra Moore, 1883
Vonona Moore, 1883
Anadara Moore, 1883 (non Gray, 1847: preoccupied)
Doricha Moore, 1883 (non Reichenbach, 1853: preoccupied)
Karadina Moore, 1891 (lapsus)
Chirosia Sharp, 1904 (lapsus)
Daniseppa Fruhstorfer, 1910 (lapsus)
Pamasa Fruhstorfer, 1910 (lapsus)
Rausuma Fruhstorfer, 1910 (lapsus)
Ironga Martin, 1914 (lapsus)
Makroploea Martin, 1915 (lapsus)
Eupolea Hulstaert, 1931 (lapsus)
Ramasa Hulstaert, 1931 (lapsus)
