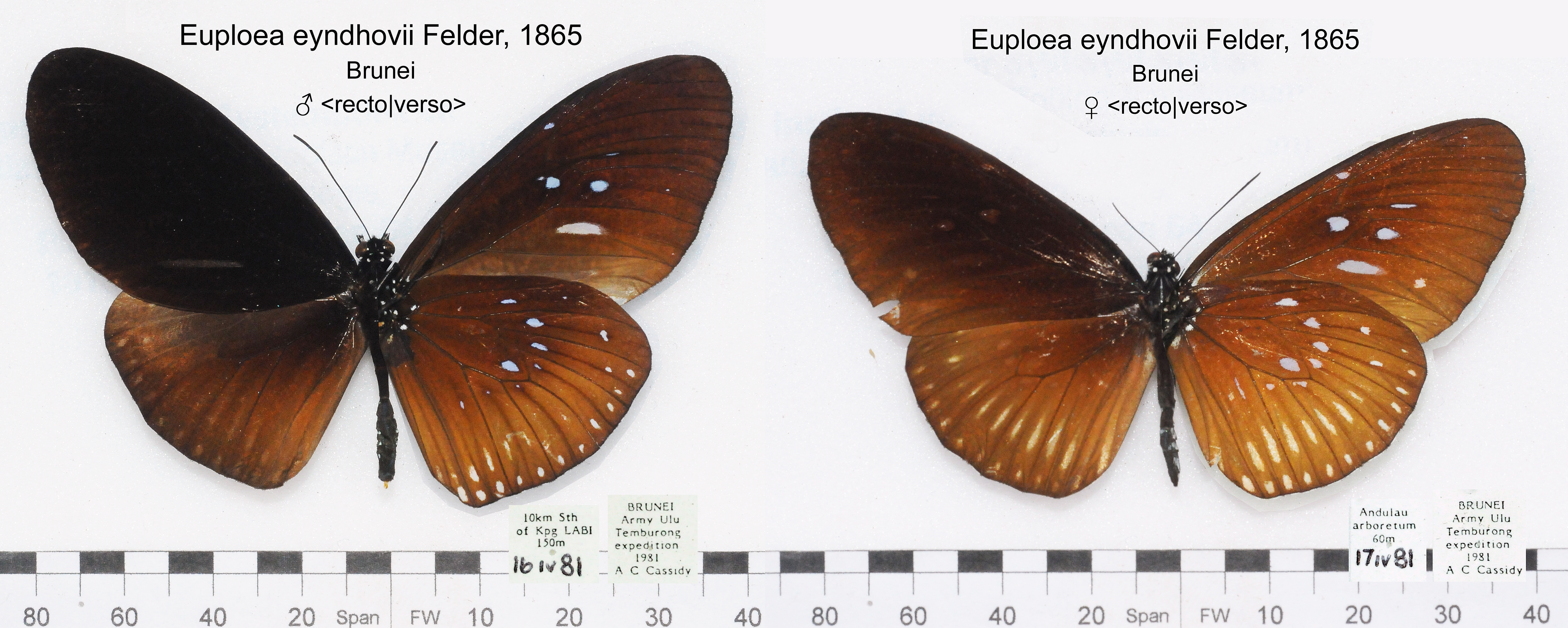

Scientific classification
- Kingdom: Animalia
- Phylum: Arthropoda
- Clade: Pancrustacea
- Class: Insecta
- Order: Lepidoptera
- Family: Nymphalidae
- Genus: Euploea
- Species: E. eyndhovii

Binomial name
- Euploea eyndhovii Felder C. & Felder R., 1865

Synonyms
- Euploea anthrax Moore, 1857; Euploea (Penoa) menetriesii var. distincta Staudinger, 1889; Penoa uniformis Moore, [1890]; pahakela Doherty, 1891; Euploea (Crastia) alcathoe simplex Fruhstorfer, 1904; vonara Fruhstorfer, 1910; martinus Fruhstorfer, 1910; salistra Fruhstorfer, 1910; lucania Fruhstorfer, 1911; distinctissima Fruhstorfer, 1911; Euploea alcathoe floresiana van Eecke, 1933; strix Bryk, 1937; Penoa alcothoe gardineri Fruhstorfer, 1898; Euploea alcathoe aesatia Fruhstorfer, 1910

= Euploea eyndhovii =

Species of butterfly

Euploea eyndhovii, the striped black crow, is a butterfly in the family Nymphalidae. It was described by Cajetan and Rudolf Felder in 1865. It is found in the Indomalayan realm.

== Subspecies ==
- E. e. eyndhovii (Java, Palawan, Engano, Nias, Wai Sano, Flores)
- E. e. gardineri (Fruhstorfer, 1898) (southern Myanmar, Thailand, Laos, Cambodia, Vietnam, Langkawi, western Malaysia, Singapore)
- E. e. arasa Fruhstorfer, 1910 (Vietnam)
