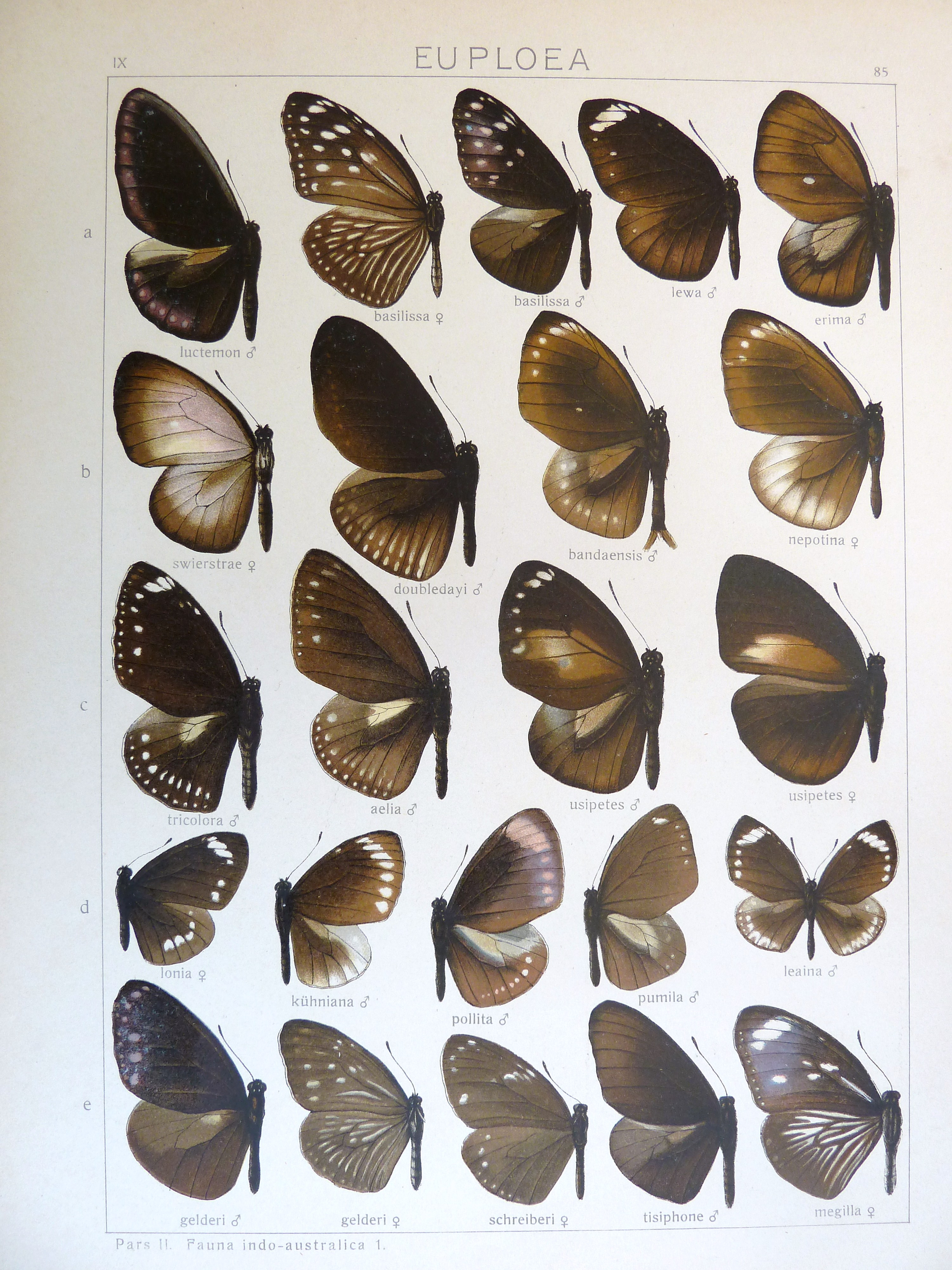
- In Seitz 85b male

Scientific classification
- Domain: Eukaryota
- Kingdom: Animalia
- Phylum: Arthropoda
- Class: Insecta
- Order: Lepidoptera
- Family: Nymphalidae
- Genus: Euploea
- Species: E. doubledayi

Binomial name
- Euploea doubledayi C. Felder & R. Felder, 1865

= Euploea doubledayi =

Striped black crow

Species of butterfly

Euploea doubledayi, the greater striped black crow, is a butterfly found in India and South-East Asia that belongs to the crows and tigers, that is, the danaid group of the brush-footed butterflies family.

== See also ==
- List of butterflies of India
- List of butterflies of India (Nymphalidae)
