= Ludwig Martin (entomologist) =

Ludwig Martin (17 February 1858 in Munich—10 December 1924 in München-Purkheim) was a German entomologist.

Ludwig Martin was a physician in Palu.

He collected and studied butterflies in Sumatra (1882 and 1895), South Celebes (1906), West Borneo (1909/10) and Central-Celebes.

== Works ==
Partial list:

- Nicéville, L. & Martin, L., 1896. A list of the butterflies of Sumatra with especial reference to the species occurring in the north-east of the island. Journal of the Asiatic Society of Bengal [II] 64 :357-555.
- Martin, L., 1914-1920. Die Tagfalter der Insel Celebes. Deutsche Entomologische Zeitschrift Iris, Dresden 28: 59-107; 29: 4-19, 50-90; 33: 48-98; 34: 181-210.
- Martin, L., 1920-1924. Die Tagfalter der Insel Celebes. Eine kritische Studie mit einigen Neubeschreibungen.Tijdschrift voor Entomologie 63: 111-159; 67: 32-116.
- Martin, L., 1929. Die Tagfalter der Insel Celebes. Mitteilungen der Münchner Entomologischen Gesellschaft 19: 117-164 (Teil 8: Satyriden), 371-380 (Fam. Amathusiidae).
