= List of Mecysmaucheniidae species =

This page lists all described species of the spider family Mecysmaucheniidae accepted by the World Spider Catalog as of January 2021:

== Aotearoa ==
Aotearoa Forster & Platnick, 1984

- A. magna (Forster, 1949) (type) — New Zealand

== Chilarchaea ==
Chilarchaea Forster & Platnick, 1984

- C. quellon Forster & Platnick, 1984 (type) — Chile, Argentina

== Mecysmauchenioides ==
Mecysmauchenioides Forster & Platnick, 1984

- M. nordenskjoldi (Tullgren, 1901) (type) — Chile, Argentina
- M. quetrihue Grismado & Ramírez, 2005 — Argentina

== Mecysmauchenius ==
Mecysmauchenius Simon, 1884

- M. canan Forster & Platnick, 1984 — Chile
- M. chacamo Forster & Platnick, 1984 — Chile
- M. chapo Forster & Platnick, 1984 — Chile
- M. chepu Forster & Platnick, 1984 — Chile
- M. chincay Forster & Platnick, 1984 — Chile
- M. eden Forster & Platnick, 1984 — Chile
- M. fernandez Forster & Platnick, 1984 — Chile (Juan Fernandez Is.)
- M. gertschi Zapfe, 1960 — Chile, Argentina
- M. newtoni Forster & Platnick, 1984 — Chile
- M. osorno Forster & Platnick, 1984 — Chile, Argentina
- M. platnicki Grismado & Ramírez, 2005 — Chile
- M. puyehue Forster & Platnick, 1984 — Chile
- M. segmentatus Simon, 1884 (type) — Chile, Argentina, Falkland Is.
- M. termas Forster & Platnick, 1984 — Chile
- M. thayerae Forster & Platnick, 1984 — Chile, Argentina
- M. victoria Forster & Platnick, 1984 — Chile
- M. villarrica Forster & Platnick, 1984 — Chile

== Mesarchaea ==
Mesarchaea Forster & Platnick, 1984

- M. bellavista Forster & Platnick, 1984 (type) — Chile

== Semysmauchenius ==
Semysmauchenius Forster & Platnick, 1984

- S. antillanca Forster & Platnick, 1984 (type) — Chile

== Zearchaea ==
Zearchaea

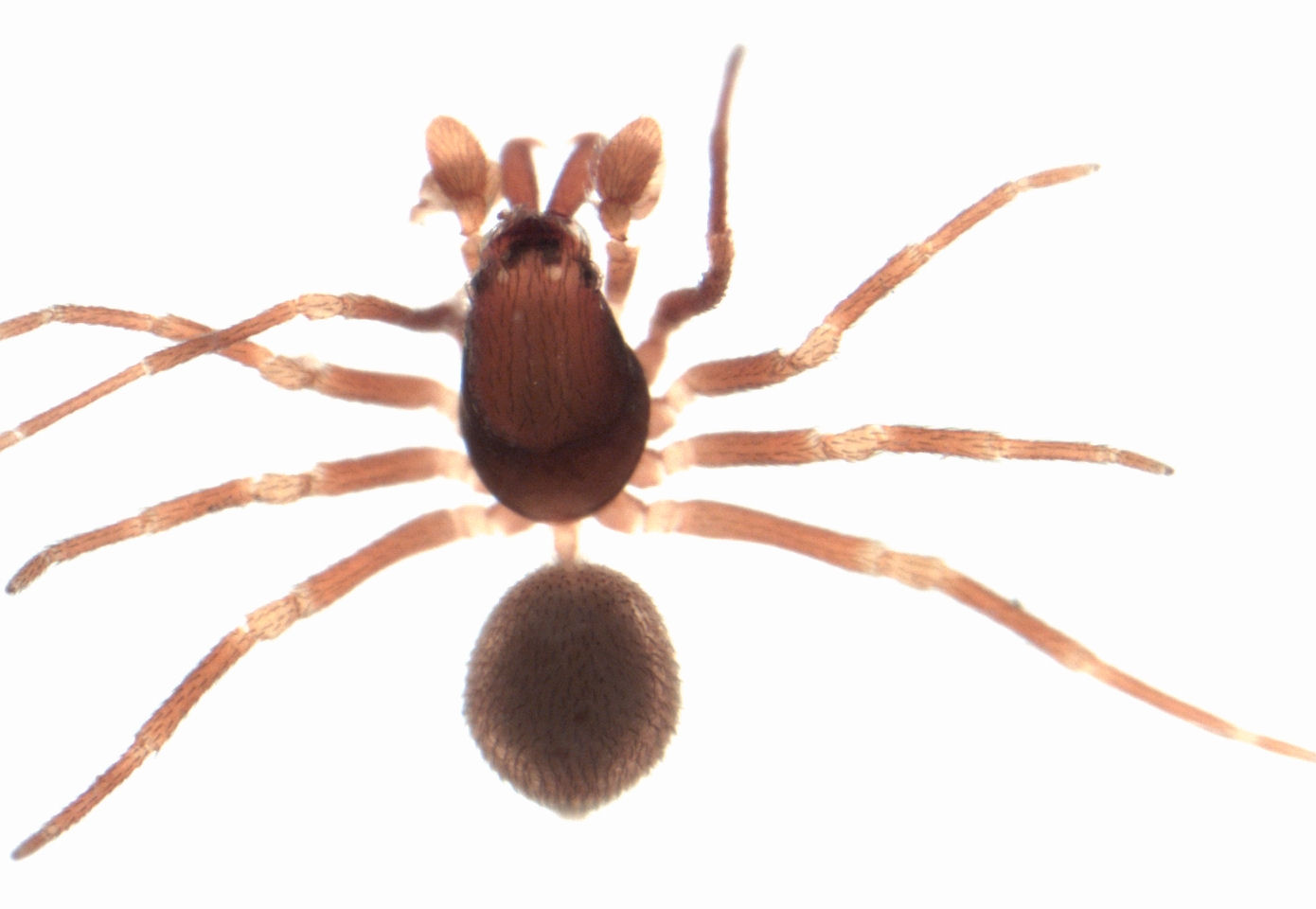
Zearchaea clypeata, male

Zearchaea Wilton, 1946

- Z. clypeata Wilton, 1946 (type) — New Zealand
- Z. fiordensis Forster, 1955 — New Zealand
