= List of Stenochilidae species =

This page lists all described species of the spider family Stenochilidae accepted by the World Spider Catalog as of December 2020:

== Colopea ==
Colopea Simon, 1893

- C. laeta (Thorell, 1895) — Myanmar, Thailand
- C. lehtineni Zheng, Marusik & Li, 2009 — China
- C. malayana Lehtinen, 1982 — Thailand, Malaysia, Singapore
- C. pusilla (Simon, 1893) (type) — Philippines
- C. romantica Lehtinen, 1982 — Bali
- C. silvestris Lehtinen, 1982 — New Guinea
- C. tuberculata Platnick & Shadab, 1974 — Fiji
- C. unifoveata Lehtinen, 1982 — Borneo
- C. virgata Lehtinen, 1982 — Thailand, Vietnam
- C. xerophila Lehtinen, 1982 — New Guinea

== Stenochilus ==
Stenochilus O. Pickard-Cambridge, 1871

- S. crocatus Simon, 1884 — Myanmar, Cambodia, Sri Lanka
- S. hobsoni O. Pickard-Cambridge, 1871 (type) — India
- S. scutulatus Platnick & Shadab, 1974 — India
