= C. laeta =

C. laeta may refer to:

- Callirhipis laeta, a polyphagan beetle
- Canna laeta, a garden plant
- Capsula laeta, a North American moth
- Carex laeta, a grassy plant
- Carmenta laeta, a clearwing moth
- Cepora laeta, a Timorese butterfly
- Cerbera laeta, an evergreen plant
- Cercomacra laeta, a bird endemic to Brazil
- Chalcophorotaenia laeta, a jewel beetle
- Chersotis laeta, an owlet moth
- Clavatula laeta, a sea snail
- Clivina laeta, a ground beetle
- Coenosia laeta, a true fly
- Collonia laeta, a sea snail
- Colopea laeta, a spider that produces ecribellate silk
- Cynorkis laeta, an orchidoid orchid
- Cypella laeta, a northeastern Argentinian plant
