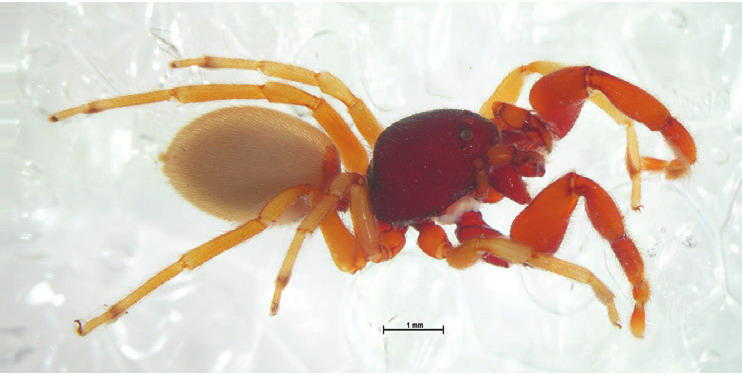
- Male Sarascelis chaperi (Palpimanidae)

Scientific classification
- Kingdom: Animalia
- Phylum: Arthropoda
- Subphylum: Chelicerata
- Class: Arachnida
- Order: Araneae
- Infraorder: Araneomorphae
- Superfamily: Palpimanoidea

Families
- Archaeidae; Huttoniidae; Mecysmaucheniidae; Palpimanidae; Stenochilidae; †Lagonomegopidae; †?Micropalpimanidae; †?Spatiatoridae; †?Vetiatoridae; See text.

= Palpimanoidea =

Palpimanoids Temporal range: Jurassic–present

Superfamily of spiders

The Palpimanoidea or palpimanoids, also known as assassin spiders, are a group of araneomorph spiders, originally treated as a superfamily. As with many such groups, its circumscription has varied. As of September 2018, the following five families were included:

- Archaeidae
- Huttoniidae
- Mecysmaucheniidae
- Palpimanidae
- Stenochilidae

Many palpimanoids specialize in preying on other spiders, hence the name "assassin spiders". They have various adaptations for catching prey, including enlarged spade-like front legs, and heads raised up on a "neck" with long chelicerae ("jaws"). Fossils suggest that the group was once widespread, but most species are now found in the Southern Hemisphere. Morphological studies support the monophyly of the group, although molecular studies have produced different results.

== Description ==
Many palpimanoids, particularly members of the families Archaeidae, Huttoniidae and Stenochilidae, specialize in preying on other spiders, hence the description "assassin spiders". They enter the retreats and webs of other spiders and seize them. Members of the families Huttoniidae, Palpimanidae and Stenochilidae have extensive scopulae on the sides of their often enlarged front legs, which enable them to both seize and manipulate prey. Members of the family Archaeidae have much smaller scopulae, but have a highly modified prosoma (cephalothorax), in which a long narrow "neck" separates a "head" portion from the rest of the prosoma. The long neck is matched by long chelicerae. Members of the Mecysmaucheniidae also have an elongated prosoma and chelicerae, although less so than archaeids. When hunting prey, mecysmaucheniids hold their chelicerae widely open. Long, forward directed hairs (setae) appear to act as triggers; when these are touched by prey, the chelicerae rapidly snap shut, enabling mecysmaucheniids to catch fast-moving prey, such as springtails.

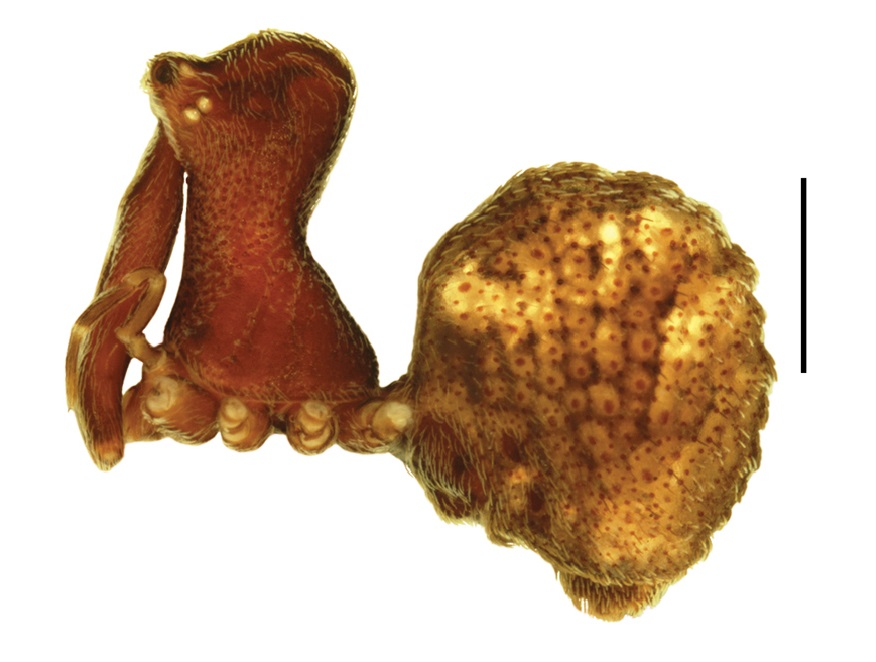
Zephyrarchaea grayi (Archaeidae), showing the "neck" and long chelicerae (bar = 1 mm)

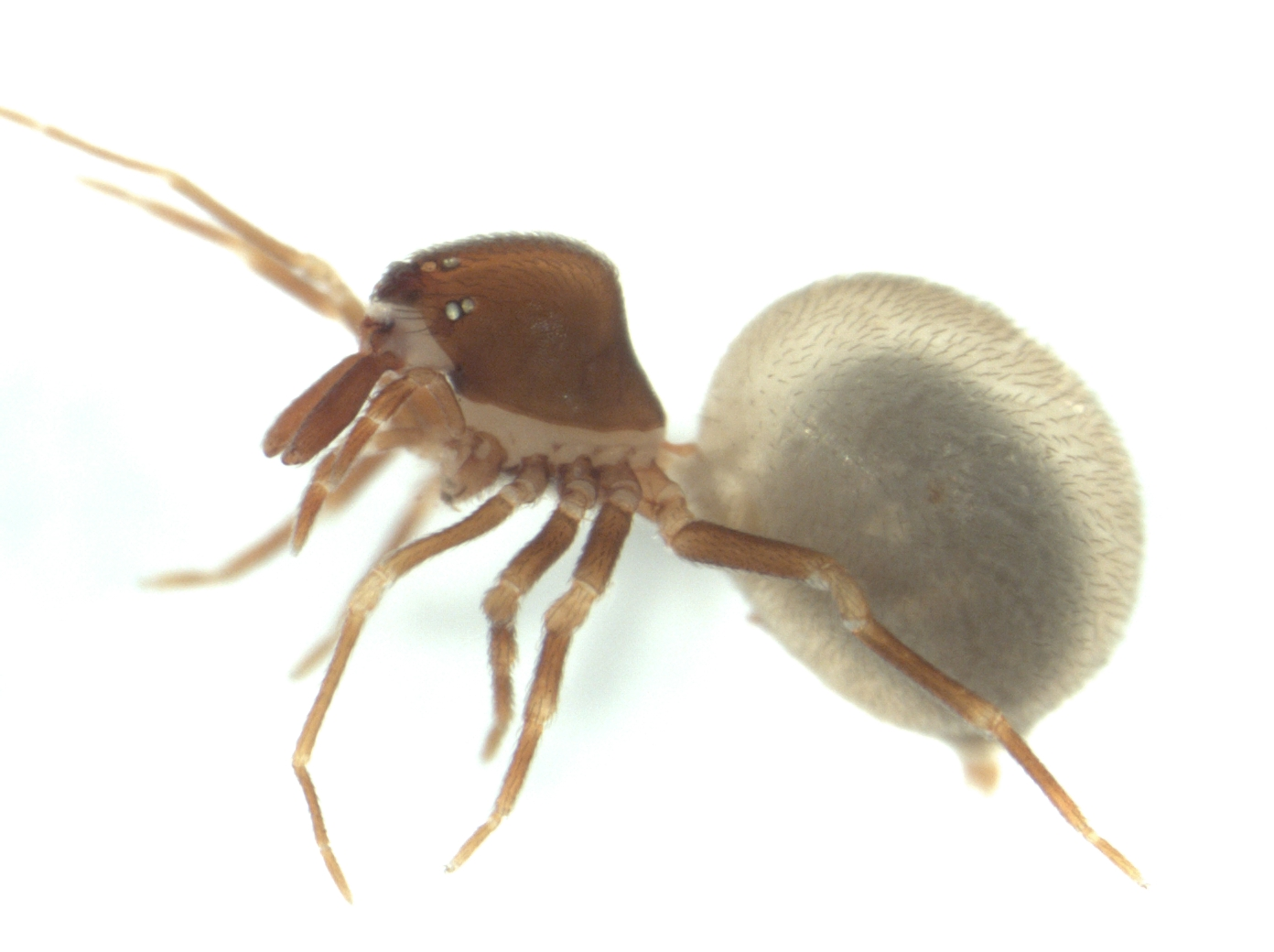
Zearchaea clypeata (Mecysmaucheniidae), showing the less long "neck" and chelicerae

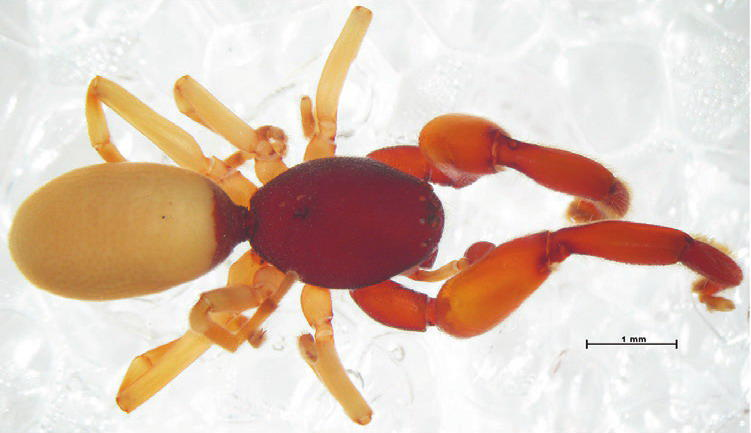
Boagrius sp. (Palpimanidae), showing the enlarged front legs (bar = 1 mm)

== Phylogeny ==
In 1984, Raymond R. Forster and Norman I. Platnick proposed that some groups previously considered araneoid actually belonged in the distantly related Palpimanoidea, including the then families Holarchaeidae, Micropholcommatidae, Mimetidae and Pararchaeidae. Subsequent phylogenetic studies have rejected this proposal, firmly placing them in Araneoidea.

Studies published in 2012 and 2013, using morphological, molecular and fossil evidence, agreed that Palpimanoidea is monophyletic. Molecular data suggested the following relationship between the five families comprising the Palpimanoidea, although three of the families were represented by only one species each:

- Palpimanoidea
  - Mecysmaucheniidae
  - - - Palpimanidae (Palpimanus sp.)
      - Huttoniidae (Huttonia sp.)
    - - Stenochilidae (Colopea sp.)
      - Archaeidae

Using only morphological data produced a different arrangement of the families:

- Palpimanoidea
  - Huttoniidae (Huttonia sp.)
  - - - Palpimanidae (Palpimanus sp.)
      - Stenochilidae (Colopea sp.)
    - - Mecysmaucheniidae
      - Archaeidae

A large molecular phylogenetic study, first published online in 2016, grouped the five families in the same way, but suggested that the Palpimanoidea, together with part of the non-monophyletic Leptonetidae, were a paraphyletic group basal to the large Entelegynae clade:

- - Mecysmaucheniidae
  - - - Palpimanidae
      - Huttoniidae
    - - - Stenochilidae
        - Archaeidae
      - - Leptonetidae (part)
        - Entelegynae

Nevertheless, the authors preferred to accept the earlier conclusion based on multiple lines of evidence that the Palpimanoidea are a monophyletic group.

Although the morphological data suggests that the two families with "necks" in the prosoma, Archaeidae and Mecysmaucheniidae, are sisters, molecular data suggests otherwise. It is now believed that the elongated and elevated "neck" has evolved independently in these two families, as well as in the more distantly related Malkaridae (Pararchaeidae).

== Distribution ==
The Palpimanoidea are mainly found in the Southern Hemisphere. Archaeidae, Huttoniidae and Mecysmaucheniidae have a Gondwanan distribution, with species native to South America, South Africa, Madagascar, Australia and New Zealand. The Stenochilidae are found in South-east Asia. Only the Palpimanidae cross into the Northern Hemisphere, with a few species reaching Central Asia and China. Palpimanoids were once more widely distributed; thus 12 fossil genera of Archaeidae have been found in the Northern Hemisphere.
