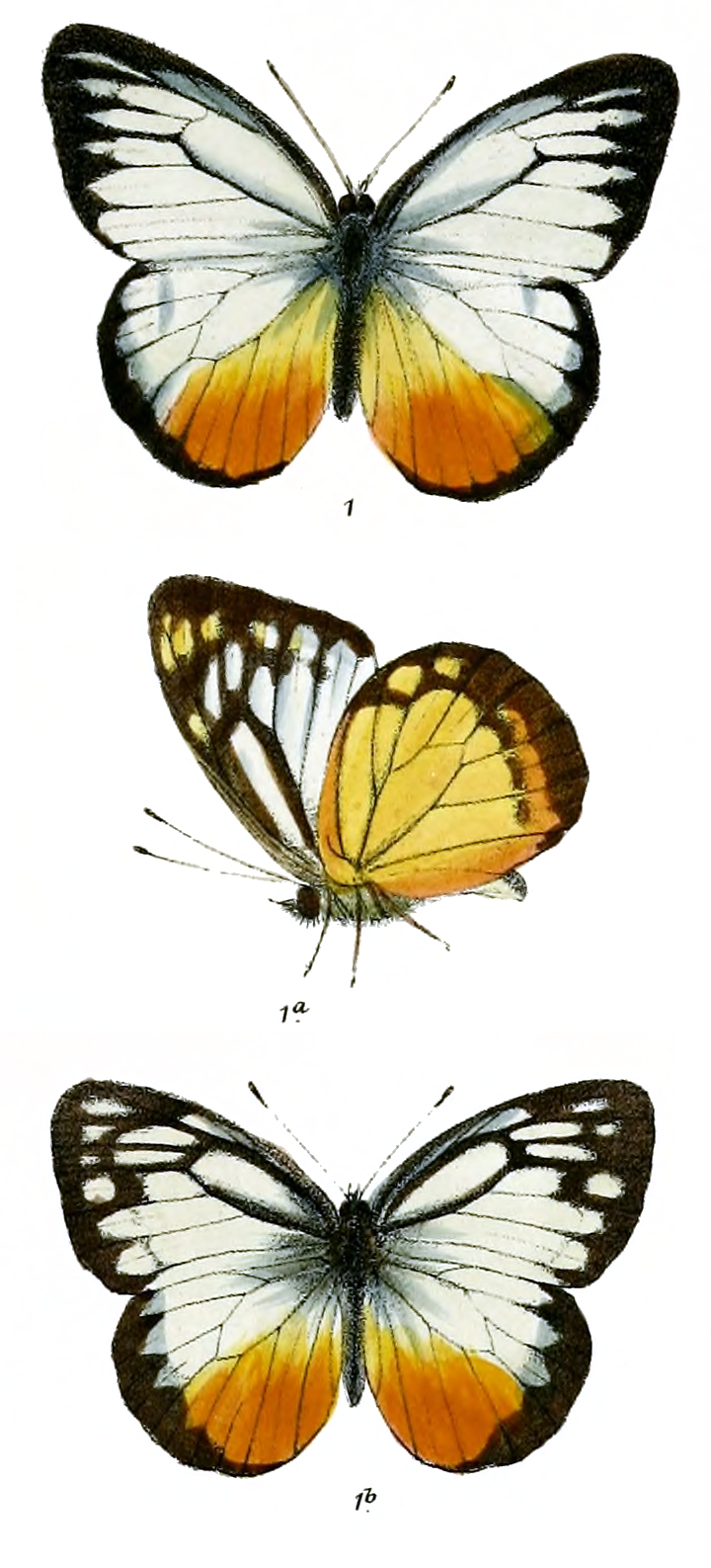
- C. j. lea (male upper and underside, female)

Scientific classification
- Kingdom: Animalia
- Phylum: Arthropoda
- Class: Insecta
- Order: Lepidoptera
- Family: Pieridae
- Genus: Cepora
- Species: C. judith

Binomial name
- Cepora judith (Fabricius, 1787)

Synonyms
- Papilio iudith Fabricius, 1787; Cepora iudith (Fabricius, 1787); Pieris lea Doubleday, 1846; Cepora iudith lea (Doubleday,1846); Cepora lea (Doubleday, 1846); Huphina lea continentalis Rober, 1927; Papilio aspasia Stoll, [1790]; Huphina malaya Fruhstorfer, 1899; Huphina siamensis Butler, 1899; Cepora aora Pendlebury, 1933; Cepora talboti Corbet, 1937; Pieris jael Wallace, 1867; Pieris asterope Godart, 1819; Cepora asterope

= Cepora judith =

Species of butterfly

Cepora judith is a butterfly of the family Pieridae. It has no common name, although a subspecies is referred to as the orange gull. It is found in south-eastern Asia (see subspecies section).

The larvae feed on Capparis species.

== Subspecies ==
- C. j. judith (Java)
- C. j. lea (Doubleday, 1846) (southern Burma)
- C. j. malaya (Fruhstorfer, 1899) (Peninsular Malaysia, Langkawi, Singapore)
- C. j. siamensis (Butler, 1899) (Thailand, Pulau Aur)
- C. j. talboti Corbet, 1937 (Pulau Tioman)
- C. j. amalia Vollenhoven, 1865 (Sumatra)
- C. j. montana Fruhstorfer, 1899 (northern Borneo)
- C. j. meridionalis Fruhstorfer, 1899 (south-eastern Borneo)
- C. j. hespera Butler, 1899 (Sarawak, Labuan)
- C. j. natuna Fruhstorfer, 1899 (Natuna Islands)
- C. j. selma Weymer, 1885 (Nias)
- C. j. ethel (Doherty, 1891) (Enggano)
- C. j. naomi Wallace, 1867 (Lombok)
- C. j. aga Fruhstorfer, 1902 (Sumbawa)
- C. j. oberthueri Röber, 1892 (Flores)
- C. j. eirene Doherty, 1891 (Sumba)
- C. j. olga (Eschscholtz, 1821) (the Philippines)
- C. j. anaitis Fruhstorfer, 1910 (north-western Luzon)
- C. j. rhemia Fruhstorfer, 1910 (Mindoro, Negros, Bohol)
- C. j. poetelia Fruhstorfer, 1910 (Cebu)
- C. j. orantia Fruhstorfer, 1910 (Mindanao)
- C. j. olgina Staudinger, 1889 (Palawan)
- C. j. zisca Fruhstorfer, 1899 (Basilan)
- C. j. irma Fruhstorfer, 1910 (Jolo)
- C. j. phokaia Fruhstorfer, 1910 (Balabac)
- C. j. jael (Wallace, 1867) (Buru, Ambon, Serang)
- ?C. j. emma Vollenhoven, 1865 (Morotai, Halmahera, Ternate, Bachan)
- ?C. j. aspasina Fruhstorfer, 1904 (Obi)
- ?C. j. hester Vollenhoven, 1865 (Waigeu)

Both Cepora aspasia and Cepora ethel are treated as a full species by some authors.
