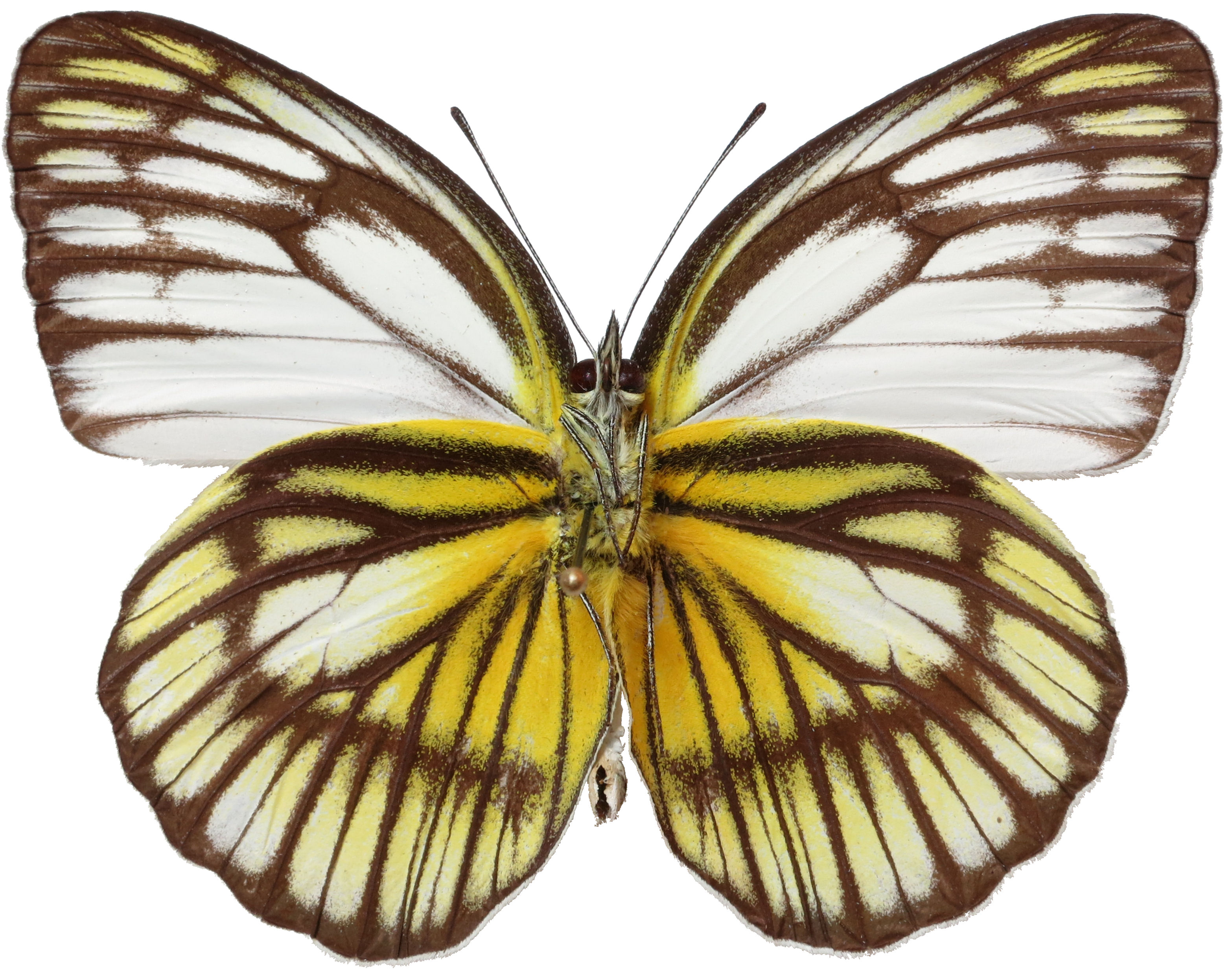

Scientific classification
- Kingdom: Animalia
- Phylum: Arthropoda
- Class: Insecta
- Order: Lepidoptera
- Family: Pieridae
- Genus: Cepora
- Species: C. eperia

Binomial name
- Cepora eperia (Boisduval, 1836)

Synonyms
- Pieris eperia Boisduval, 1836

= Cepora eperia =

Sulawesi gull

Species of butterfly

Cepora eperia, the Sulawesi gull, is a butterfly in the family Pieridae. It is found on Sulawesi.

== Subspecies ==
The following subspecies are recognised:

- Cepora eperia eperia (Sulawesi)
- Cepora eperia foa Fruhstorfer, 1897 (mountains of Sulawesi)
- Cepora eperia flava Iwasaki & Yata, 2005 (Buton Island)
