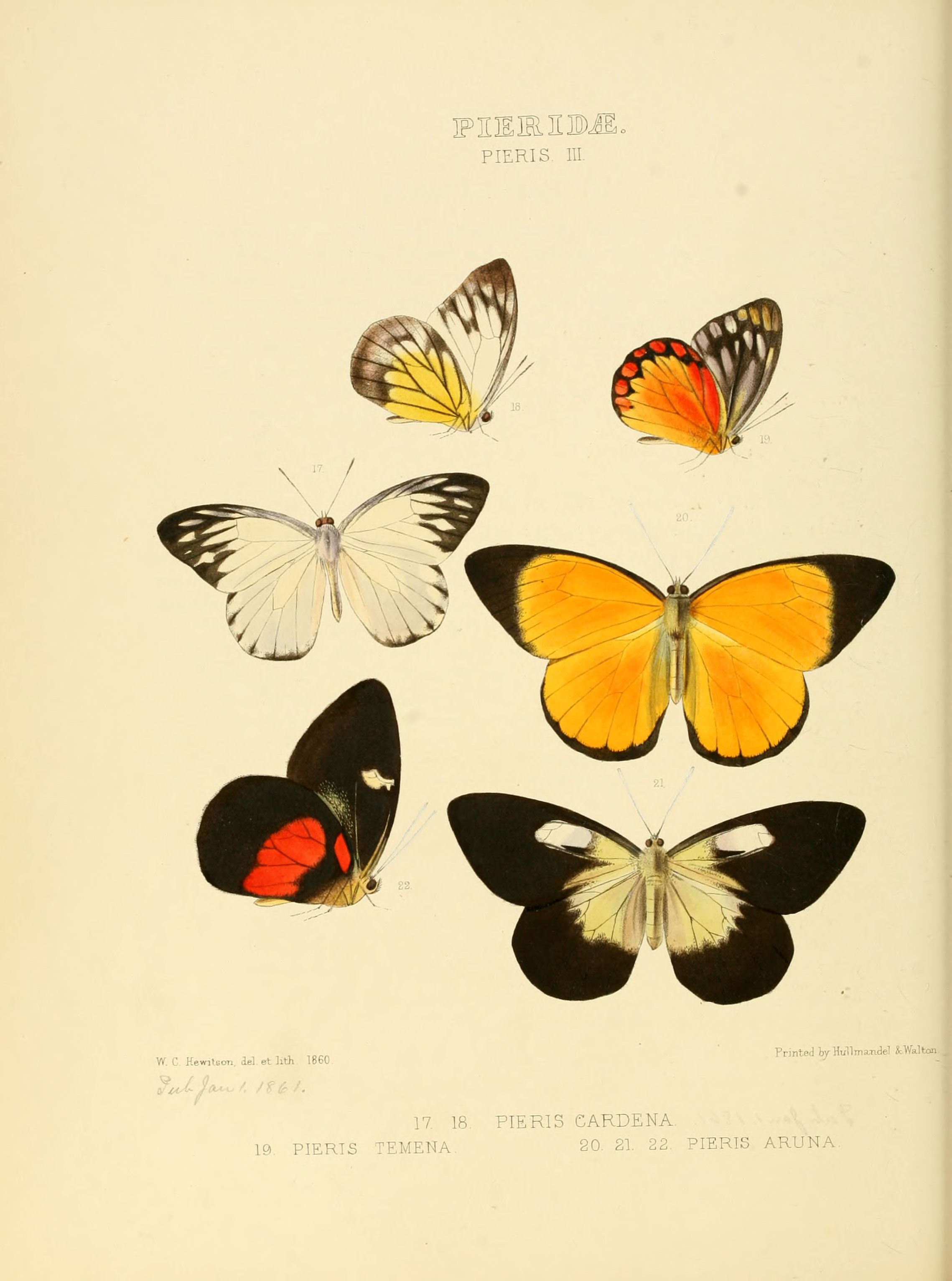
- Cepora temena (top right)

Scientific classification
- Kingdom: Animalia
- Phylum: Arthropoda
- Clade: Pancrustacea
- Class: Insecta
- Order: Lepidoptera
- Family: Pieridae
- Genus: Cepora
- Species: C. temena

Binomial name
- Cepora temena (Hewitson, 1861)

Synonyms
- Pieris temena Hewitson, 1861

= Cepora temena =

Species of butterfly

Cepora temena is a butterfly in the family Pieridae. It is found in Indonesia.

== Subspecies ==
The following subspecies are recognised:

- Cepora temena temena (Lombok)
- Cepora temena tamar Wallace, 1867 (Java, Bali)
- Cepora temena lenitas Fruhstorfer, 1910 (Sumbawa)
- Cepora temena hyele Fruhstorfer, 1910 (Lembata)
