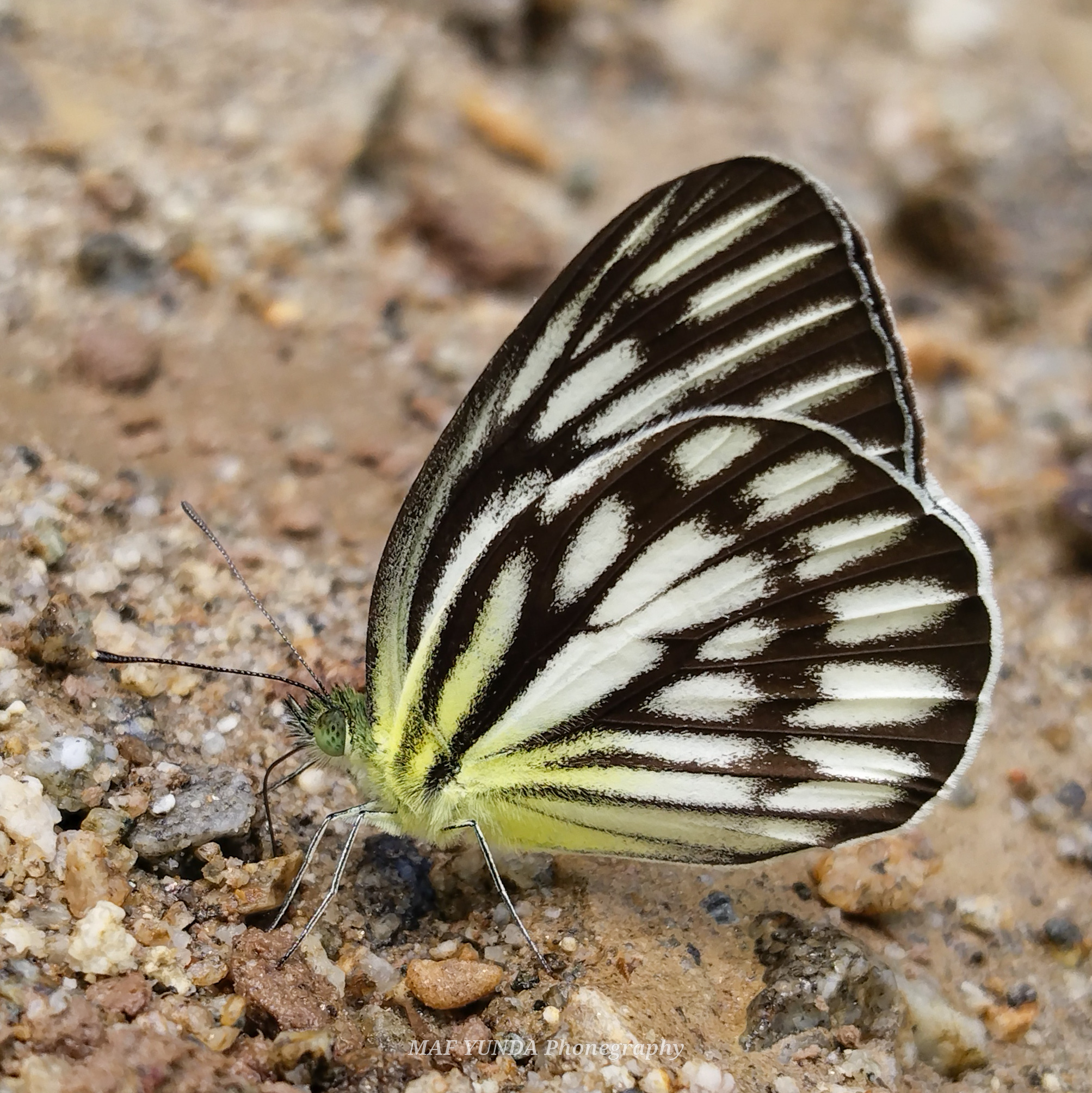
- Cepora fora from Sigi, Central Sulawesi

Scientific classification
- Kingdom: Animalia
- Phylum: Arthropoda
- Clade: Pancrustacea
- Class: Insecta
- Order: Lepidoptera
- Family: Pieridae
- Genus: Cepora
- Species: C. fora

Binomial name
- Cepora fora (Fruhstorfer, 1897)

= Cepora fora =

- in Seitz FaunaIndoAustralica d

Species of butterfly

Cepora fora is a butterfly in the family Pieridae. It is found on Sulawesi.

== Subspecies ==
The following subspecies are recognised:

- Cepora fora fora
- Cepora fora milos Watanabe, 1987 (south-eastern Sulawesi)
- Cepora fora papayatana Watanabe, 1987 (Sulawesi)
