= Cepora julia =

Scientific classification
- Kingdom: Animalia
- Phylum: Arthropoda
- Class: Insecta
- Order: Lepidoptera
- Family: Pieridae
- Genus: Cepora
- Species: C. julia

Binomial name
- Cepora julia (Doherty, 1891)

Synonyms
- Huphina julia Doherty, 1891

Species of butterfly

Cepora julia is a butterfly in the family Pieridae. It is found on Sumba and Sumbawa.

== Subspecies ==
The following subspecies are recognised:

- Cepora julia julia (Sumba)
- Cepora julia calliparga Fruhstorfer, 1910 (Sumbawa)
