= Cepora licea =

Nias gull

Scientific classification
- Kingdom: Animalia
- Phylum: Arthropoda
- Class: Insecta
- Order: Lepidoptera
- Family: Pieridae
- Genus: Cepora
- Species: C. licea

Binomial name
- Cepora licea (Fabricius, 1787)

Synonyms
- Papilio licea Fabricius, 1787; Cepora licaea

Species of butterfly

Cepora licea (Nias gull) is a butterfly in the family Pieridae. It is found on Nias.
