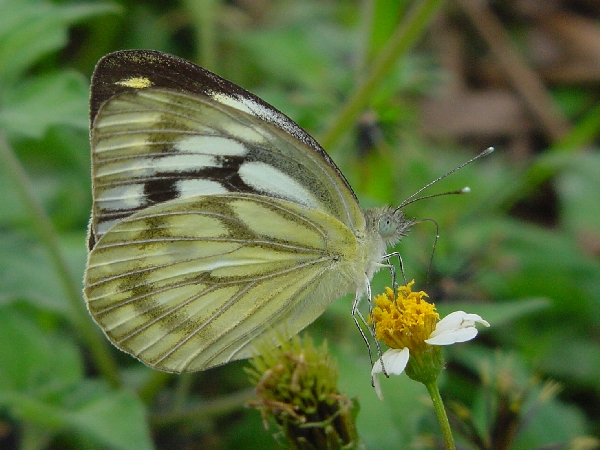
- Cepora nerissa

Scientific classification
- Kingdom: Animalia
- Phylum: Arthropoda
- Clade: Pancrustacea
- Class: Insecta
- Order: Lepidoptera
- Family: Pieridae
- Tribe: Pierini
- Genus: Cepora; Billberg, 1820

Species
- See text

Synonyms
- Huphina Moore, [1881]

= Cepora =

Genus of butterflies

Cepora is a genus of butterflies, commonly called gulls, in the family Pieridae. The genus contains about 20 species shared between the Indomalayan and Australasian realms.

== Species ==
Listed alphabetically:

- Cepora abnormis (Wallace, 1867) – Papuan gull
- Cepora aspasia (Stoll, [1790])
- Cepora bathseba (Snellen, 1902)
- Cepora boisduvaliana (C & R Felder, 1862)
- Cepora celebensis (Rothschild, 1892)
- Cepora eperia (Boisduval, 1836) – Sulawesi gull
- Cepora eurygonia (Hopffer, 1874)
- Cepora fora (Fruhstorfer, 1897)
- Cepora himiko Hanafusa, 1994
- Cepora judith (Fabricius, 1787) – orange gull
- Cepora julia (Doherty, 1891)
- Cepora kotakii Hanafusa, 1989
- Cepora laeta (Hewitson, 1862) – Timor gull
- Cepora licea (Fabricius, 1787) – Nias gull
- Cepora nadina (Lucas, 1852) – lesser gull
- Cepora nerissa (Fabricius, 1775) – common gull
- Cepora pactolicus (Butler, 1865)
- Cepora perimale (Donovan, 1805) – caper gull, Australian gull
- Cepora temena (Hewitson, 1861)
- Cepora timnatha (Hewitson, 1862)
- Cepora wui Chou, Zhang & Wang, 2001
