= Colopea xerophila =

Scientific classification
- Domain: Eukaryota
- Kingdom: Animalia
- Phylum: Arthropoda
- Subphylum: Chelicerata
- Class: Arachnida
- Order: Araneae
- Infraorder: Araneomorphae
- Family: Stenochilidae
- Genus: Colopea
- Species: C. xerophila

Binomial name
- Colopea xerophila Lehtinen, 1982

Species of spider

Colopea xerophila is a species of spider in the genus Colopea found in New Guinea.

== Description ==
Male length: 4.5 mm

Female length: 5.0 mm
