= Cepora himiko =

Scientific classification
- Kingdom: Animalia
- Phylum: Arthropoda
- Clade: Pancrustacea
- Class: Insecta
- Order: Lepidoptera
- Family: Pieridae
- Genus: Cepora
- Species: C. himiko

Binomial name
- Cepora himiko Hanafusa, 1994

Species of butterfly

Cepora himiko is a butterfly in the family Pieridae. It is found on the Mentawai Islands.
