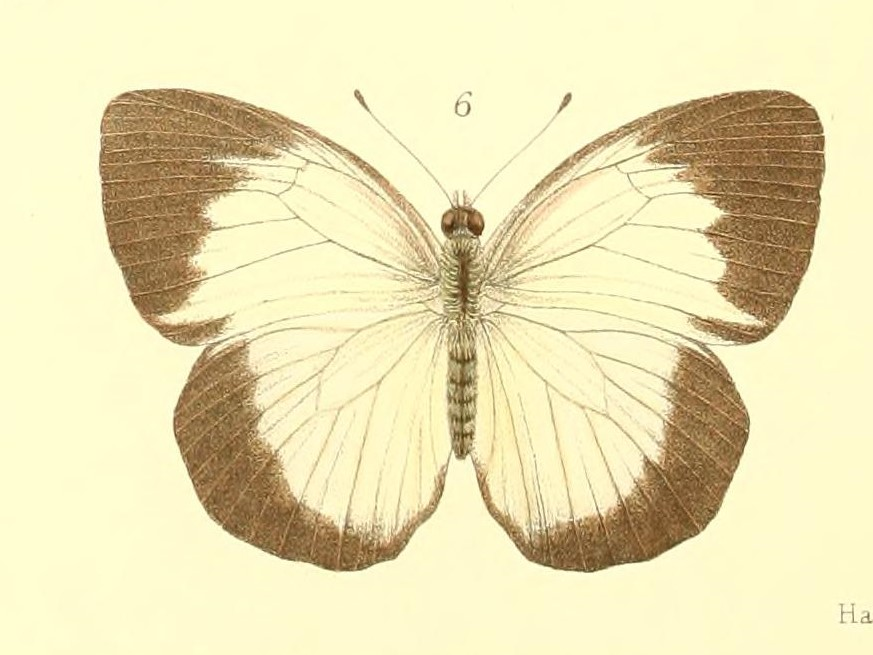

Scientific classification
- Kingdom: Animalia
- Phylum: Arthropoda
- Class: Insecta
- Order: Lepidoptera
- Family: Pieridae
- Genus: Cepora
- Species: C. abnormis

Binomial name
- Cepora abnormis (Wallace, 1867)

Synonyms
- Tachyris abnormis Wallace, 1867; Delias abnormis; Delias abnormis var. euryxantha Honrath, 1892

= Cepora abnormis =

Papuan gull

Species of butterfly

Cepora abnormis, the Papuan gull, is a species of butterfly in the family Pieridae found in Indonesia.

The larvae feed on Capparis zippeliana.

== Subspecies ==
The following subspecies are recognised:

- Cepora abnormis abnormis (West Irian to New Guinea)
- Cepora abnormis euryxantha (Honrath, 1892) (New Guinea to Papua New Guinea)
