= Cepora eurygonia =

Scientific classification
- Kingdom: Animalia
- Phylum: Arthropoda
- Class: Insecta
- Order: Lepidoptera
- Family: Pieridae
- Genus: Cepora
- Species: C. eurygonia

Binomial name
- Cepora eurygonia Hopffer, 1874

Species of butterfly

Cepora eurygonia is a butterfly in the family Pieridae. It is found on north-eastern Sulawesi.
