= Stenochilus crocatus =

Scientific classification
- Kingdom: Animalia
- Phylum: Arthropoda
- Subphylum: Chelicerata
- Class: Arachnida
- Order: Araneae
- Infraorder: Araneomorphae
- Family: Stenochilidae
- Genus: Stenochilus
- Species: S. crocatus

Binomial name
- Stenochilus crocatus Simon, 1884

Species of spider

Stenochilus crocatus is a species of spider in the genus Stenochilus.
