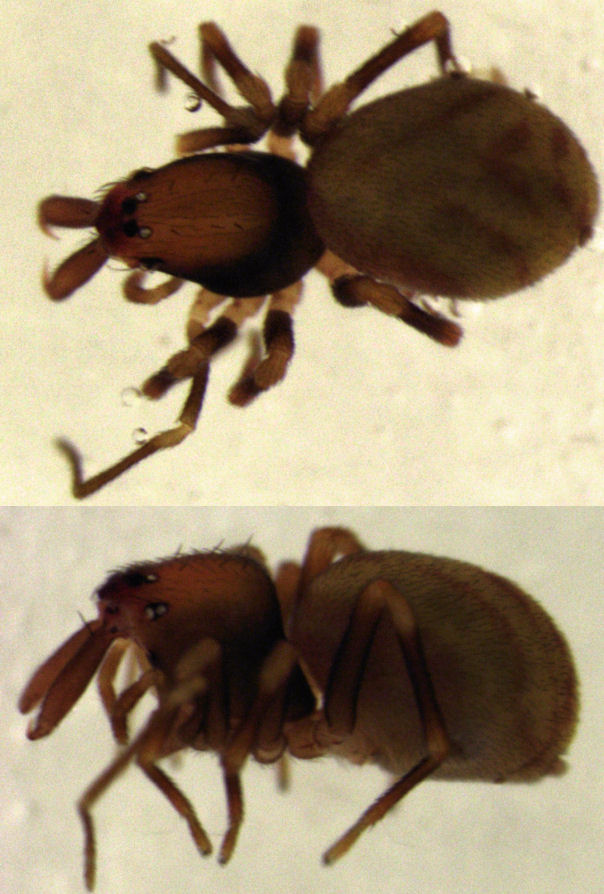

Conservation status
- Not Threatened (NZ TCS)

Scientific classification
- Kingdom: Animalia
- Phylum: Arthropoda
- Subphylum: Chelicerata
- Class: Arachnida
- Order: Araneae
- Infraorder: Araneomorphae
- Family: Mecysmaucheniidae
- Genus: Zearchaea
- Species: Z. fiordensis

Binomial name
- Zearchaea fiordensis Forster, 1955

= Zearchaea fiordensis =

Species of spider

Zearchaea fiordensis is a species of Mecysmaucheniidae spider that is endemic to New Zealand.

== Taxonomy ==
This species was described in 1955 by Ray Forster from male and female specimens collected in the South Island. The holotype is stored in Canterbury Museum.

== Description ==
The male is recorded at 1.63mm in length whereas the female is 1.57mm. This species has a yellowish brown cephalothorax, yellowish brown legs and uniform creamy white abdomen.

== Distribution ==
This species is only known from scattered localities in the South Island of New Zealand.

== Conservation status ==
Under the New Zealand Threat Classification System, this species is listed as "Not Threatened".
