= Cepora bathseba =

Scientific classification
- Kingdom: Animalia
- Phylum: Arthropoda
- Class: Insecta
- Order: Lepidoptera
- Family: Pieridae
- Genus: Cepora
- Species: C. bathseba

Binomial name
- Cepora bathseba (Snellen, 1902)

Species of butterfly

Cepora bathseba is a butterfly in the family Pieridae. It is found on Kangean.
