= Cepora kotakii =

Scientific classification
- Kingdom: Animalia
- Phylum: Arthropoda
- Class: Insecta
- Order: Lepidoptera
- Family: Pieridae
- Genus: Cepora
- Species: C. kotakii

Binomial name
- Cepora kotakii Hanafusa, 1989

Species of butterfly

Cepora kotakii is a butterfly in the family Pieridae. It is found on Simeulue Island.
