= Cepora wui =

Scientific classification
- Kingdom: Animalia
- Phylum: Arthropoda
- Clade: Pancrustacea
- Class: Insecta
- Order: Lepidoptera
- Family: Pieridae
- Genus: Cepora
- Species: C. wui

Binomial name
- Cepora wui Chou, Zhang & Wang, 2001

Species of butterfly

Cepora wui is a butterfly in the family Pieridae. The butterfly is found in China (Yunnan).
