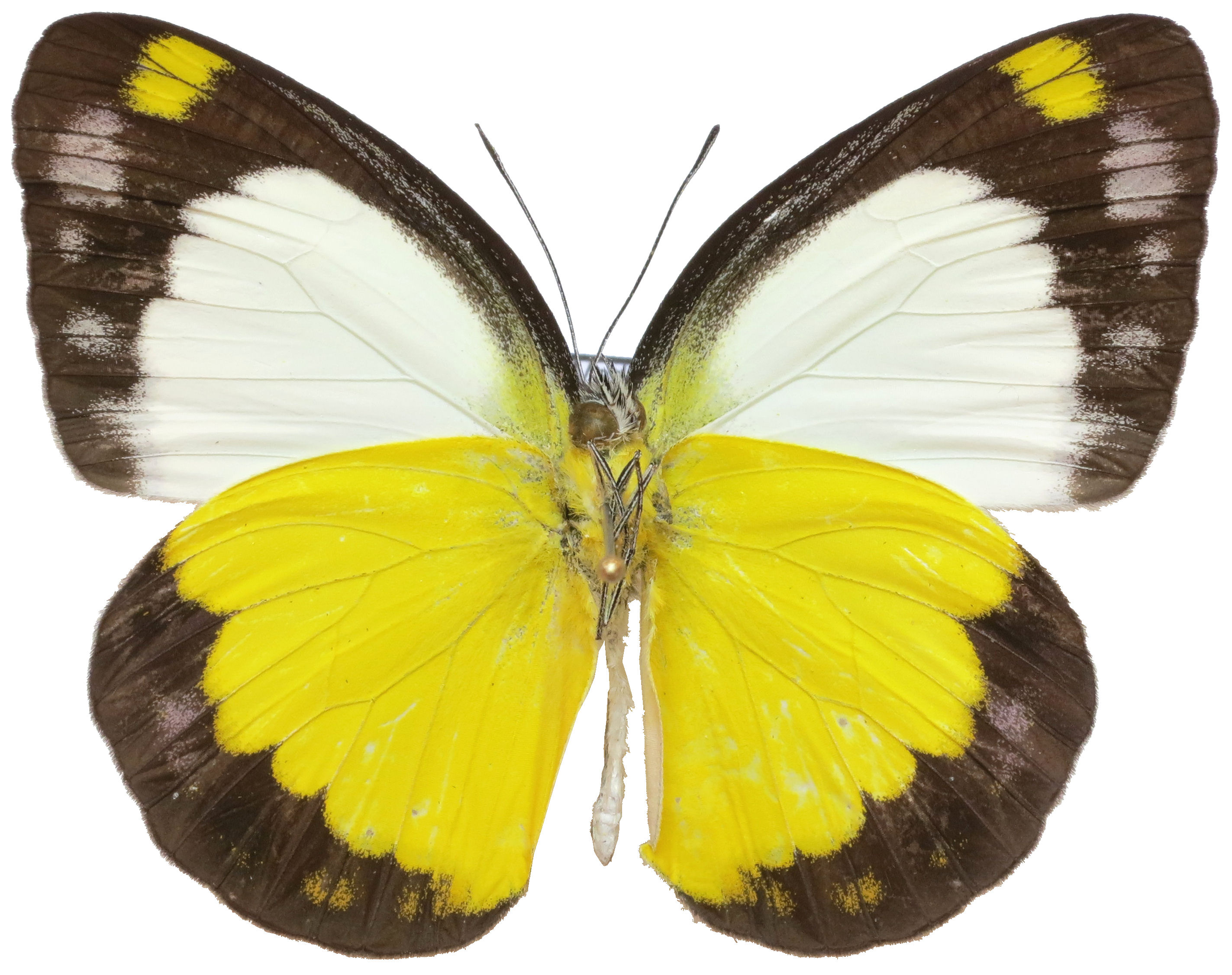
- Cepora boisduvaliana boisduvaliana

Scientific classification
- Kingdom: Animalia
- Phylum: Arthropoda
- Class: Insecta
- Order: Lepidoptera
- Family: Pieridae
- Genus: Cepora
- Species: C. boisduvaliana

Binomial name
- Cepora boisduvaliana C. & R. Felder, 1862

= Cepora boisduvaliana =

Species of butterfly

Cepora boisduvaliana is a butterfly in the family Pieridae. It is found on the Philippines.

== Subspecies ==
The following subspecies are recognised:

- Cepora boisduvaliana boisduvaliana (Luzon, Marinduque, Masbate, Mindoro, Panay)
- Cepora boisduvaliana semperi Staudinger, 1890 (Basilan, Mindanao, Samar, Ticao)
- Cepora boisduvaliana cirta Fruhstorfer, 1910 (Bohol)
- Cepora boisduvaliana balbagona Semper 1890 (Camiguin de Mindanao)
- Cepora boisduvaliana sibuyanensis Schröder, 1977 (Sibuyan)
- Cepora boisduvaliana cebuensis Schroder, 1977 (Cebu)
- Cepora boisduvaliana leytensis M.& T.Okano, 1991 (Leyte)
- Cepora boisduvaliana negrosensis M.& T.Okano, 1991 (Negros)
