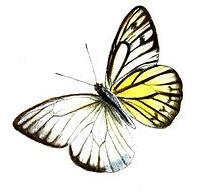

Scientific classification
- Kingdom: Animalia
- Phylum: Arthropoda
- Class: Insecta
- Order: Lepidoptera
- Family: Pieridae
- Genus: Cepora
- Species: C. pactolicus

Binomial name
- Cepora pactolicus (Butler, 1865)

Synonyms
- Pieris pactolicus Butler, 1865

= Cepora pactolicus =

Species of butterfly

Cepora pactolicus is a butterfly in the family Pieridae. It is found on Borneo.
