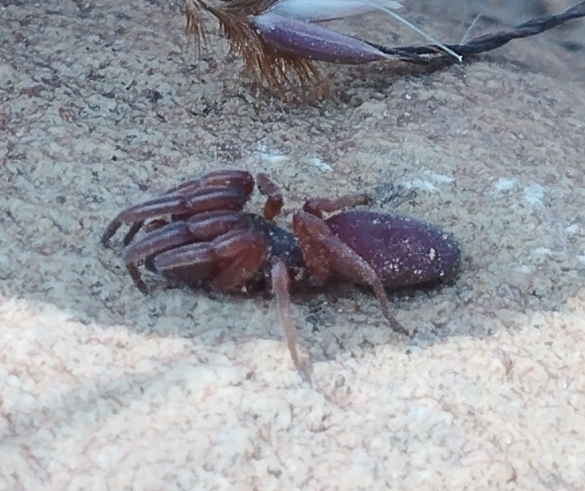
- Stenochilus sp. in India

Scientific classification
- Kingdom: Animalia
- Phylum: Arthropoda
- Subphylum: Chelicerata
- Class: Arachnida
- Order: Araneae
- Infraorder: Araneomorphae
- Family: Stenochilidae
- Genus: Stenochilus; O. Pickard-Cambridge, 1871

Type species
- S. hobsoni O. Pickard-Cambridge, 1871

Species
- S. crocatus Simon, 1884; S. hobsoni O. Pickard-Cambridge, 1871; S. scutulatus Platnick & Shadab, 1974

Synonyms
- Metronax Simon, 1893

= Stenochilus =

Genus of spiders

Stenochilus is a genus of Asian araneomorph spiders in the Stenochilidae family, with three described species. It was first described by Octavius Pickard-Cambridge in 1871.

This genus is considered a senior synonym of Metronax

== Species ==
As of January 2026, this genus includes three species:

- Stenochilus crocatus Simon, 1884 – Myanmar, Cambodia, Sri Lanka
- Stenochilus hobsoni O. Pickard-Cambridge, 1871 – Iraq, India
- Stenochilus scutulatus Platnick & Shadab, 1974 – India
