= Mecysmauchenius =

Scientific classification
- Kingdom: Animalia
- Phylum: Arthropoda
- Subphylum: Chelicerata
- Class: Arachnida
- Order: Araneae
- Infraorder: Araneomorphae
- Family: Mecysmaucheniidae
- Genus: Mecysmauchenius; Simon

Type species
- Mecysmauchenius segmentatus

Species
- 17, see text

Genus of spiders

Mecysmauchenius is a genus of spiders in the Mecysmaucheniidae family. It was first described in 1884 by Eugène Simon. As of 2017, it contains 17 species.

== Species ==
Mecysmauchenius comprises the following species:

- Mecysmauchenius canan Forster & Platnick, 1984
- Mecysmauchenius chacamo Forster & Platnick, 1984
- Mecysmauchenius chapo Forster & Platnick, 1984
- Mecysmauchenius chepu Forster & Platnick, 1984
- Mecysmauchenius chincay Forster & Platnick, 1984
- Mecysmauchenius eden Forster & Platnick, 1984
- Mecysmauchenius fernandez Forster & Platnick, 1984
- Mecysmauchenius gertschi Zapfe, 1960
- Mecysmauchenius newtoni Forster & Platnick, 1984
- Mecysmauchenius osorno Forster & Platnick, 1984
- Mecysmauchenius platnicki Grismado & Ramírez, 2005
- Mecysmauchenius puyehue Forster & Platnick, 1984
- Mecysmauchenius segmentatus Simon, 1884
- Mecysmauchenius termas Forster & Platnick, 1984
- Mecysmauchenius thayerae Forster & Platnick, 1984
- Mecysmauchenius victoria Forster & Platnick, 1984
- Mecysmauchenius villarrica Forster & Platnick, 1984
