= Semysmauchenius =

Scientific classification
- Kingdom: Animalia
- Phylum: Arthropoda
- Subphylum: Chelicerata
- Class: Arachnida
- Order: Araneae
- Infraorder: Araneomorphae
- Family: Mecysmaucheniidae
- Genus: Semysmauchenius
- Species: S. antillanca

Binomial name
- Semysmauchenius antillanca Forster & Platnick, 1984

Monotypic genus of spiders

Semysmauchenius is a genus of spiders in the Mecysmaucheniidae family. It was first described in 1984 by Forster & Platnick. As of 2017, it contains only one Chilean species, Semysmauchenius antillanca.
