= Mesarchaea =

Scientific classification
- Kingdom: Animalia
- Phylum: Arthropoda
- Subphylum: Chelicerata
- Class: Arachnida
- Order: Araneae
- Infraorder: Araneomorphae
- Family: Mecysmaucheniidae
- Genus: Mesarchaea
- Species: M. bellavista

Binomial name
- Mesarchaea bellavista Forster & Platnick, 1984

Genus of spiders

Mesarchaea is a genus of spiders in the Mecysmaucheniidae family. It was first described in 1984 by Forster & Platnick. As of 2017, it contains only one species, Mesarchaea bellavista, found in Chile.
