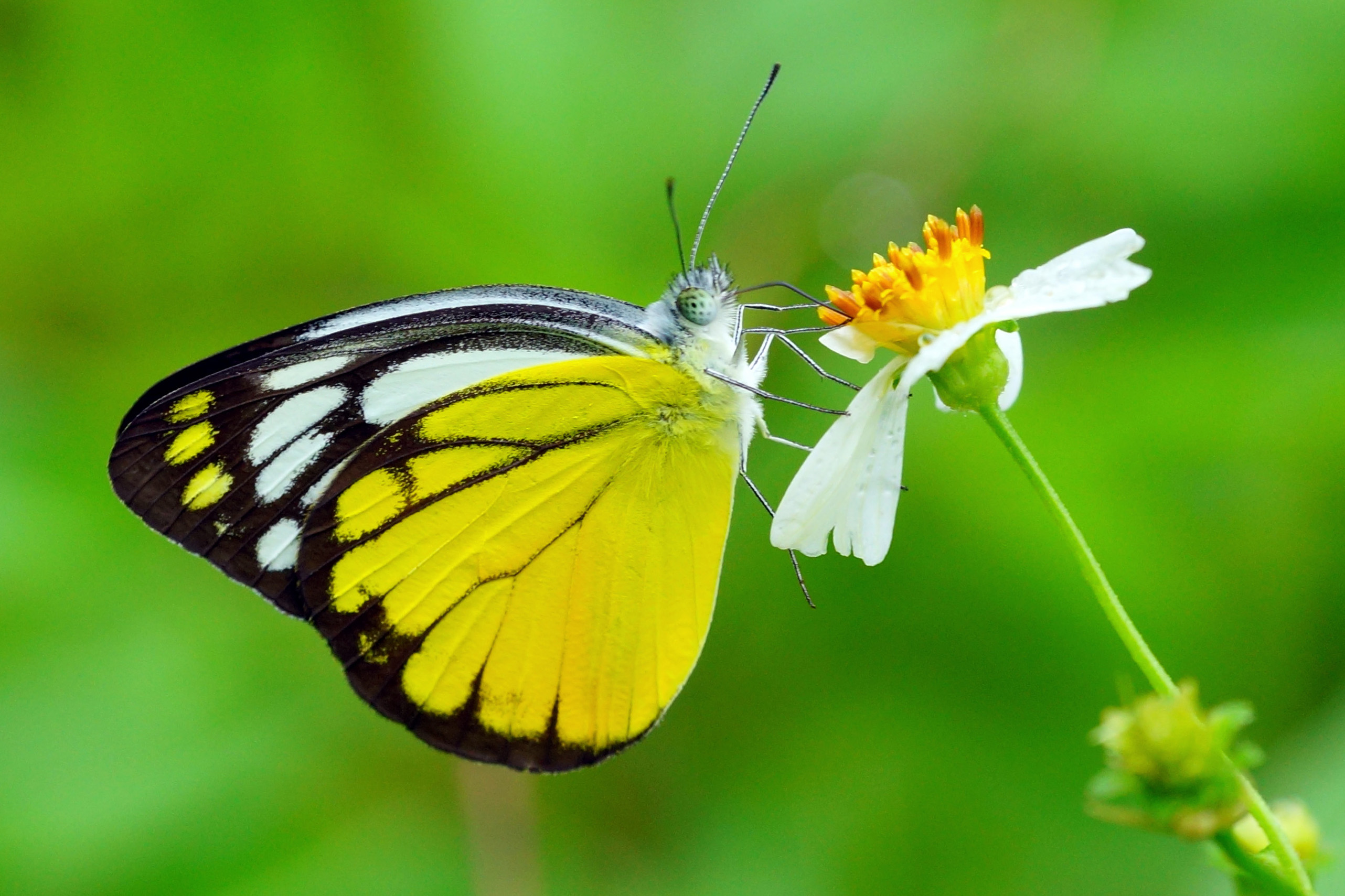
- Cepora aspasia olga

Scientific classification
- Kingdom: Animalia
- Phylum: Arthropoda
- Class: Insecta
- Order: Lepidoptera
- Family: Pieridae
- Genus: Cepora
- Species: C. aspasia

Binomial name
- Cepora aspasia (Stoll, [1790])

Subspecies
- C. a. aspasia; ?C. a. aspasina (Fruhstorfer, 1904); ?C. a. emma (Vollenhoven, 1865); ?C. a. hester (Vollenhoven, 1865); C. a. jael (Wallace, 1867); C. a. talautensis Niepelt, 1926

Synonyms
- Papilio aspasia

= Cepora aspasia =

Species of butterfly

Cepora aspasia is a butterfly in the family Pieridae, found in Indonesia.
