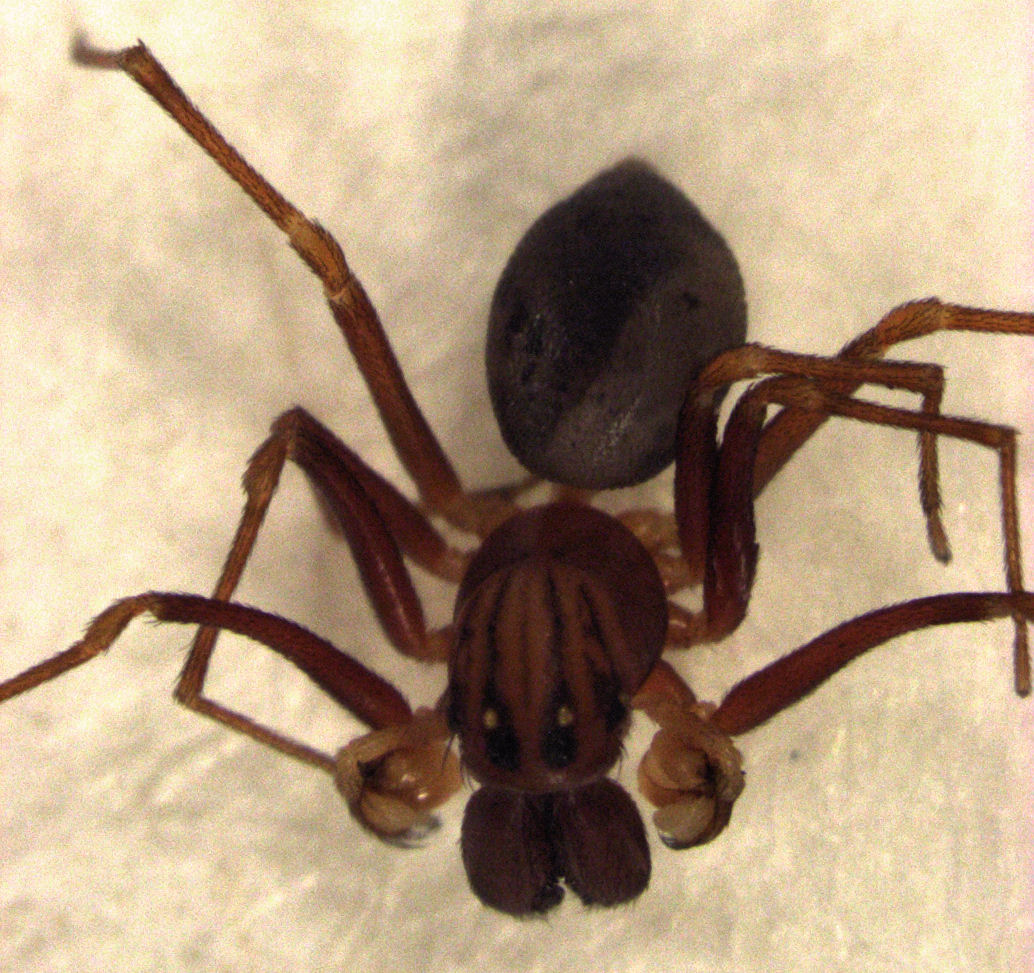
- Male Aotearoa magna

Conservation status
- Not Threatened (NZ TCS)

Scientific classification
- Kingdom: Animalia
- Phylum: Arthropoda
- Subphylum: Chelicerata
- Class: Arachnida
- Order: Araneae
- Infraorder: Araneomorphae
- Family: Mecysmaucheniidae
- Genus: Aotearoa; Forster & Platnick, 1984
- Species: A. magna

Binomial name
- Aotearoa magna (Forster, 1949)

Synonyms
- Zearchaea magna

= Aotearoa magna =

Species of spider

Aotearoa magna is a species of spiders in the Mecysmaucheniidae family. It was first described in 1949 by Forster. As of 2017, it is the only species in the genus Aotearoa, erected by Forster and Platnick in 1984. It is found in New Zealand. (The Māori name of the island nation is Aotearoa.)

== Taxonomy ==
This species was described in 1949 by Ray Forster from male and female specimens collected in Fiordland. In 1984, it was moved into the Aotearoa genus by Ray Forster and Norman Platnick, of which it is the sole member. The holotype is stored in Canterbury Museum.

== Description ==
The male is recorded at 2.62mm in length whereas the female is 3.83mm. This species has a dark brown carapace and a greyish yellow abdomen. The head has dark brown markings dorsally near the eyes.

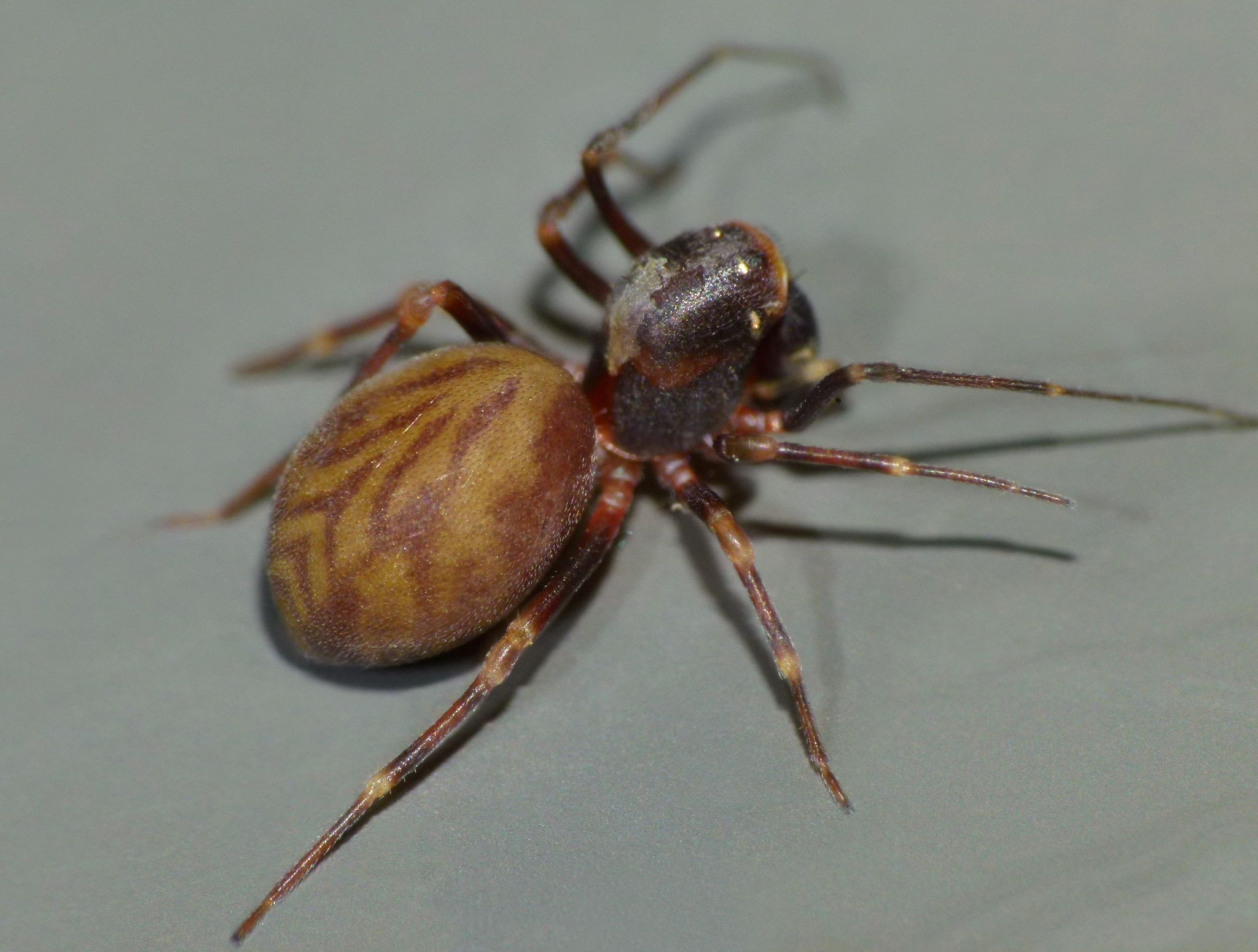

== Distribution ==
This species is only known from Fiordland, New Zealand.

== Conservation status ==
Under the New Zealand Threat Classification System, this species is listed as "Not Threatened".
