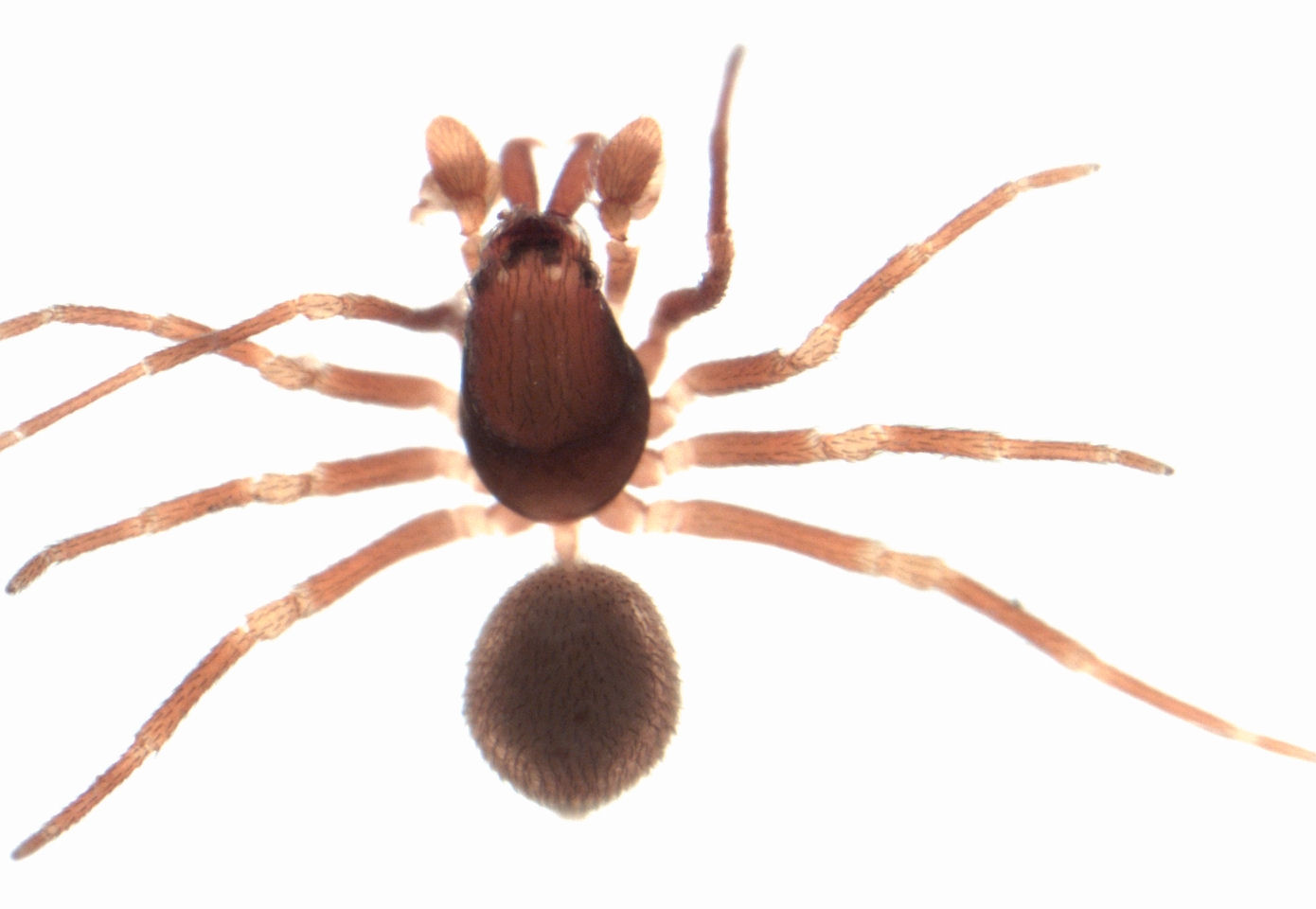
- Z. clypeata (male)

Scientific classification
- Domain: Eukaryota
- Kingdom: Animalia
- Phylum: Arthropoda
- Subphylum: Chelicerata
- Class: Arachnida
- Order: Araneae
- Infraorder: Araneomorphae
- Family: Mecysmaucheniidae
- Genus: Zearchaea; Wilton, 1946

Species
- Zearchaea clypeata Wilton, 1946; Zearchaea fiordensis Forster, 1955

= Zearchaea =

Genus of spiders

Zearchaea is a genus of spiders in the Mecysmaucheniidae family. It was first described in 1946 by Wilton. As of February 2019, it contains 2 species from New Zealand.
