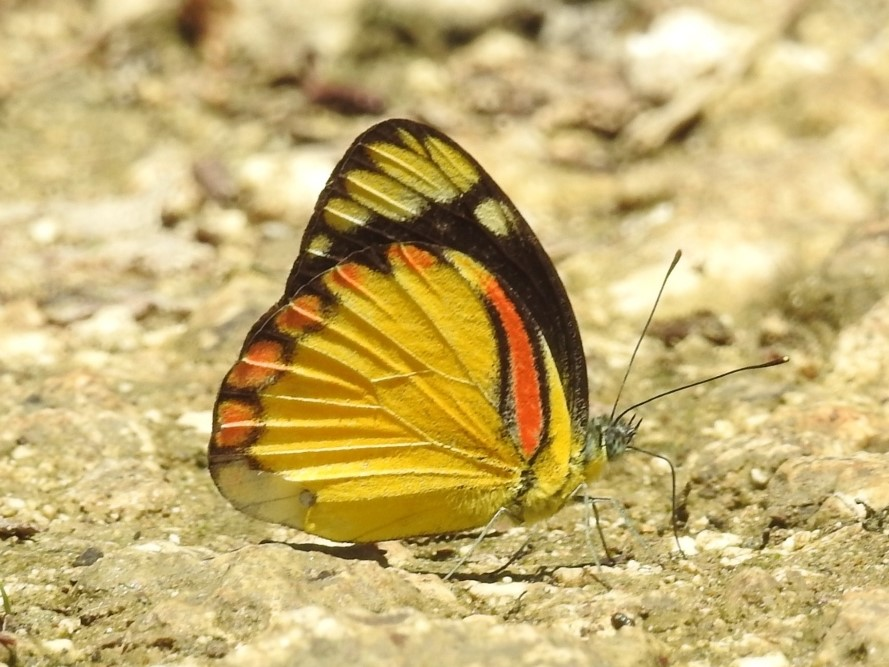

Scientific classification
- Kingdom: Animalia
- Phylum: Arthropoda
- Class: Insecta
- Order: Lepidoptera
- Family: Pieridae
- Genus: Cepora
- Species: C. laeta

Binomial name
- Cepora laeta Hewitson, [1862]

= Cepora laeta =

Timor gull

Species of butterfly

Cepora laeta, commonly known as the Timor gull, is a species of butterfly in the family Pieridae. It is found on Timor.
