= Chilarchaea =

Scientific classification
- Kingdom: Animalia
- Phylum: Arthropoda
- Subphylum: Chelicerata
- Class: Arachnida
- Order: Araneae
- Infraorder: Araneomorphae
- Family: Mecysmaucheniidae
- Genus: Chilarchaea; Forster & Platnick, 1984
- Species: C. quellon

Binomial name
- Chilarchaea quellon Forster & Platnick, 1984

Genus of spiders

Chilarchaea is a monotypic genus of spiders in the Mecysmaucheniidae family. It was first described by Forster & Platnick in 1984. As of 2023, it contains only one species, Chilarchaea quellon, found in Chile and Argentina.
