= Mecysmauchenioides =

Scientific classification
- Kingdom: Animalia
- Phylum: Arthropoda
- Subphylum: Chelicerata
- Class: Arachnida
- Order: Araneae
- Infraorder: Araneomorphae
- Family: Mecysmaucheniidae
- Genus: Mecysmauchenioides; Platnick

Species
- Mecysmauchenioides nordenskjoldi (Tullgren, 1901); Mecysmauchenioides quetrihue Grismado & Ramírez, 2005

Genus of spiders

Mecysmauchenioides is a genus of spiders in the Mecysmaucheniidae family. It was first described in 1984 by Forster & Platnick. As of 2016, it contains 2 species from South America.
