= Colopea =

Scientific classification
- Kingdom: Animalia
- Phylum: Arthropoda
- Subphylum: Chelicerata
- Class: Arachnida
- Order: Araneae
- Infraorder: Araneomorphae
- Family: Stenochilidae
- Genus: Colopea; Simon, 1893

Type species
- C. pusilla (Simon, 1893)

Species
- 10, see text

Genus of spiders

Colopea is a genus of araneomorph spiders in the Stenochilidae family, and was first described by Eugène Louis Simon in 1893.

== Species ==
As of September 2019 it contains ten species, found in Asia, on Fiji, and in Papua New Guinea:

- Colopea laeta (Thorell, 1895) – Myanmar, Thailand
- Colopea lehtineni Zheng, Marusik & Li, 2009 – China
- Colopea malayana Lehtinen, 1982 – Thailand, Malaysia, Singapore
- Colopea pusilla (Simon, 1893) (type) – Philippines
- Colopea romantica Lehtinen, 1982 – Bali
- Colopea silvestris Lehtinen, 1982 – New Guinea
- Colopea tuberculata Platnick & Shadab, 1974 – Fiji
- Colopea unifoveata Lehtinen, 1982 – Borneo
- Colopea virgata Lehtinen, 1982 – Thailand, Vietnam
- Colopea xerophila Lehtinen, 1982 – New Guinea
