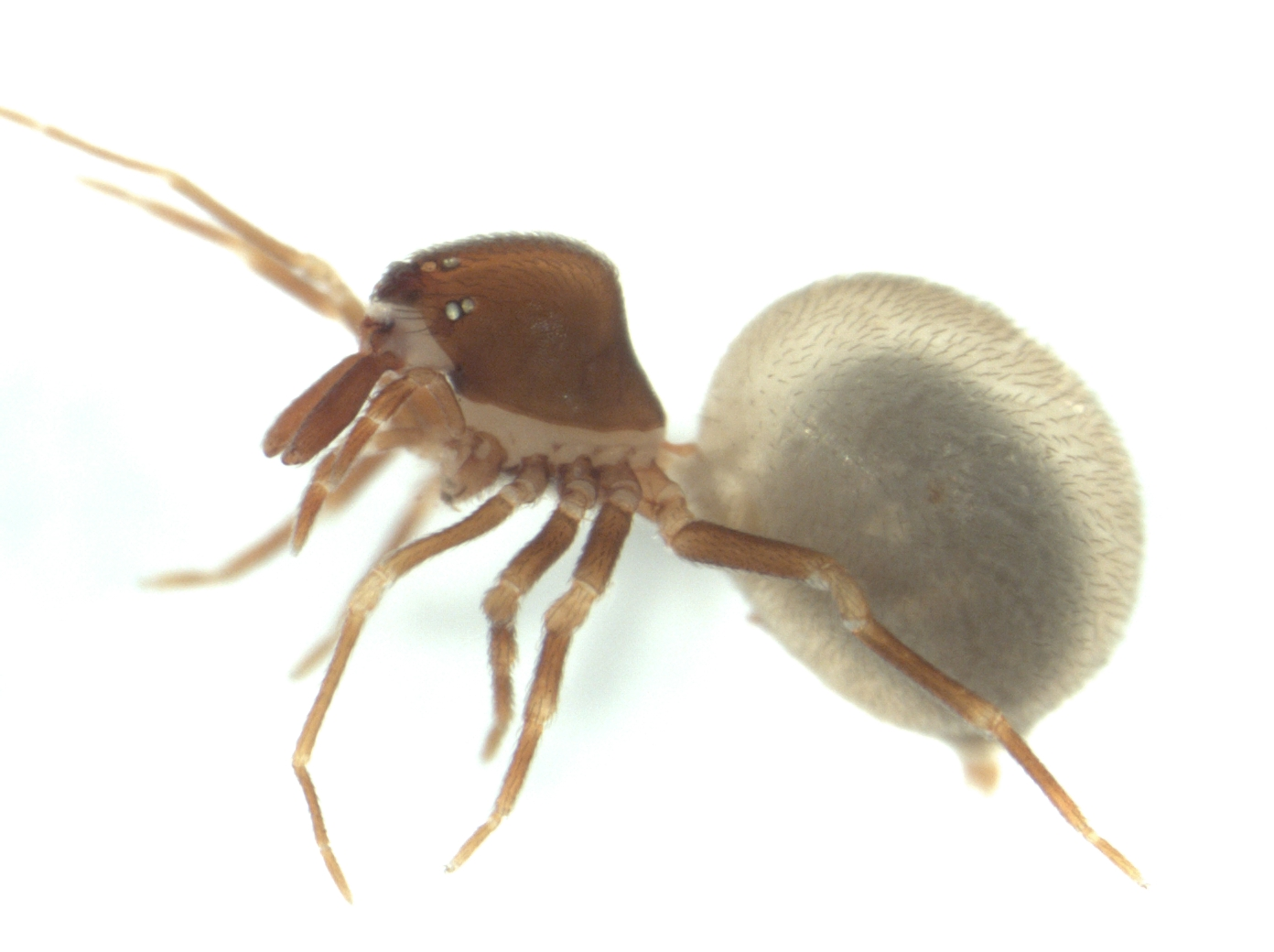
- Zearchaea clypeata
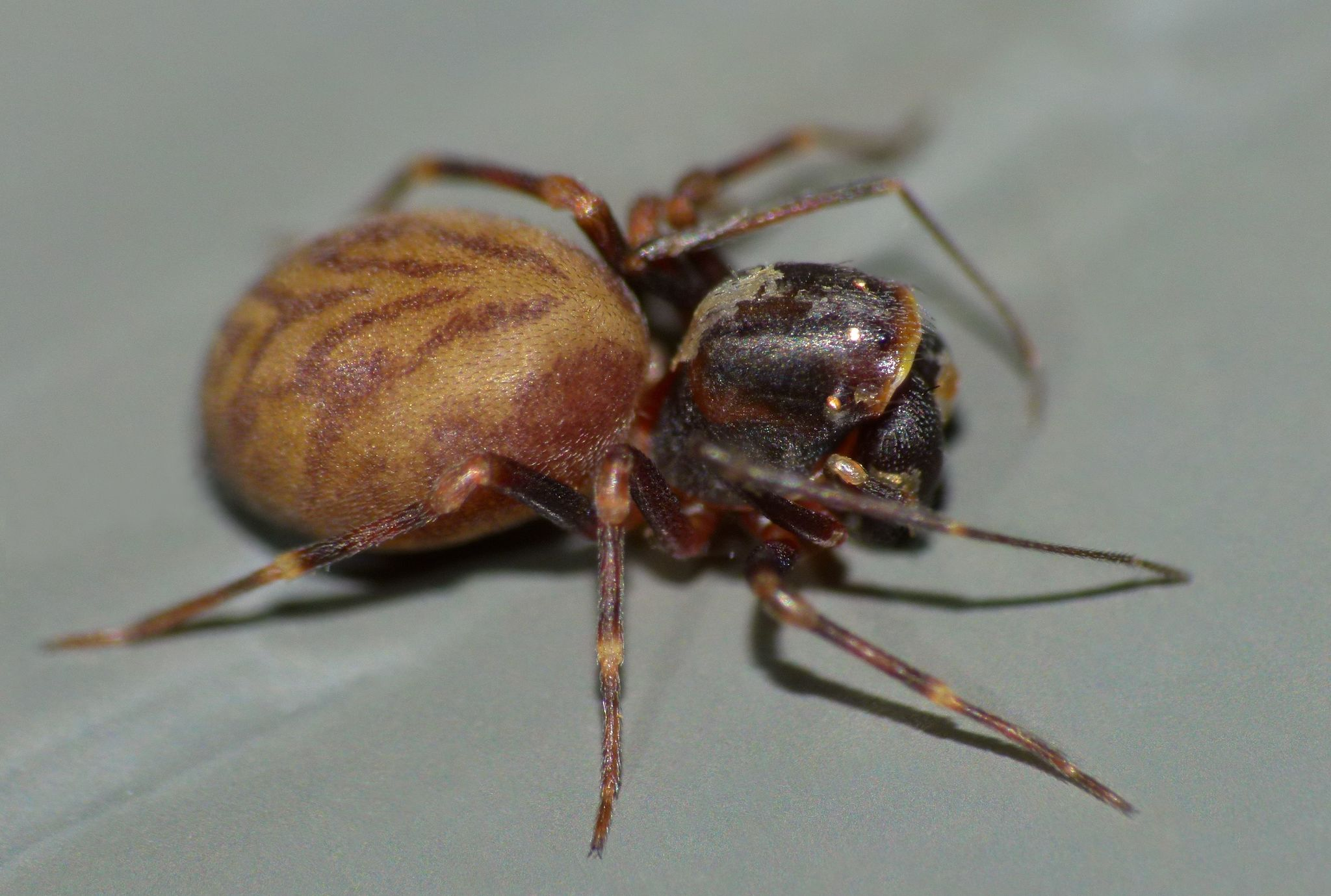
- Aotearoa magna in New Zealand

Scientific classification
- Kingdom: Animalia
- Phylum: Arthropoda
- Subphylum: Chelicerata
- Class: Arachnida
- Order: Araneae
- Infraorder: Araneomorphae
- Superfamily: Palpimanoidea
- Family: Mecysmaucheniidae; Simon, 1895

Diversity
- 7 genera, 25 species
- blue: reported countries (WSC)

= Mecysmaucheniidae =

Mecysmaucheniidae Temporal range: Cretaceous–present

Family of spiders

Mecysmaucheniidae is a family of araneomorph spiders first described by Eugène Simon in 1895. Most genera occur in South America (Chile and Argentina), with two genera endemic to New Zealand.

== Genera ==
As of January 2026, this family includes seven genera and 25 species:

- Aotearoa Forster & Platnick, 1984 – New Zealand
- Chilarchaea Forster & Platnick, 1984 – Argentina, Chile
- Mecysmauchenioides Forster & Platnick, 1984 – Argentina, Chile
- Mecysmauchenius Simon, 1884 – Argentina, Chile, Falkland Islands
- Mesarchaea Forster & Platnick, 1984 – Chile
- Semysmauchenius Forster & Platnick, 1984 – Chile
- Zearchaea Wilton, 1946 – New Zealand
