= Stenochilus hobsoni =

Scientific classification
- Domain: Eukaryota
- Kingdom: Animalia
- Phylum: Arthropoda
- Subphylum: Chelicerata
- Class: Arachnida
- Order: Araneae
- Infraorder: Araneomorphae
- Family: Stenochilidae
- Genus: Stenochilus
- Species: S. hobsoni

Binomial name
- Stenochilus hobsoni O. Pickard-Cambridge, 1871

Species of spider

Stenochilus hobsoni is a species of spiders in the genus Stenochilus.
