= Colopea laeta =

Scientific classification
- Kingdom: Animalia
- Phylum: Arthropoda
- Subphylum: Chelicerata
- Class: Arachnida
- Order: Araneae
- Infraorder: Araneomorphae
- Family: Stenochilidae
- Genus: Colopea
- Species: C. laeta

Binomial name
- Colopea laeta (Thorell, 1895)

Synonyms
- Metronax laetus; Colopea pusilla

Species of spider

Colopea laeta is a species of spider belonging to the family Stenochilidae.

== Distribution ==
This spider species is found in Myanmar and Thailand.

== Description ==
The juvenile holotype measures 4.25mm. The male spider, as described by Lehtinen in 1982, measures 4.7mm, and the female measures 7.6mm.

== Taxonomy ==
This spider species was first described under the protonym Metronax laetus by Thorell in 1895. In 1974, Platnick and Shadab placed it in synonymy with Colopea pusilla. It was later relieved of synonymy in the genus Colopea by Lehtinen in 1982.
