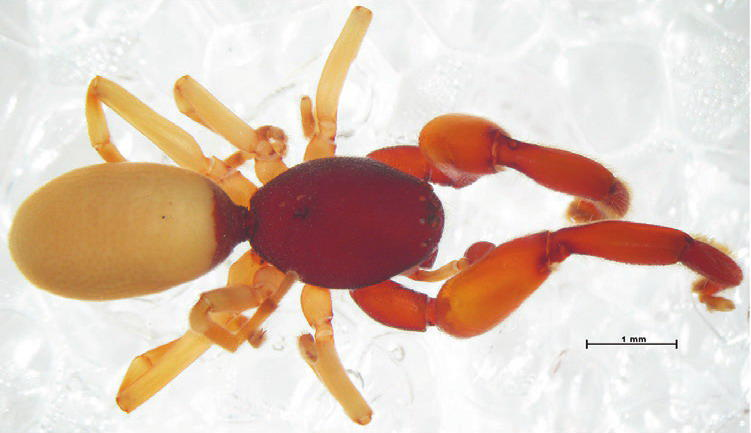

Scientific classification
- Kingdom: Animalia
- Phylum: Arthropoda
- Subphylum: Chelicerata
- Class: Arachnida
- Order: Araneae
- Infraorder: Araneomorphae
- Family: Palpimanidae
- Genus: Boagrius; Simon, 1893

Type species
- B. pumilus Simon, 1893

Species
- B. incisus Tullgren, 1910 – Tanzania; B. pumilus Simon, 1893 – Malaysia, Indonesia (Sumatra)

= Boagrius =

Genus of spiders

Boagrius is a genus of palp-footed spiders that was first described by Eugène Louis Simon in 1893. As of June 2019 it contains only two species, found only in Indonesia, Malaysia, and Tanzania: B. incisus and B. pumilus.
