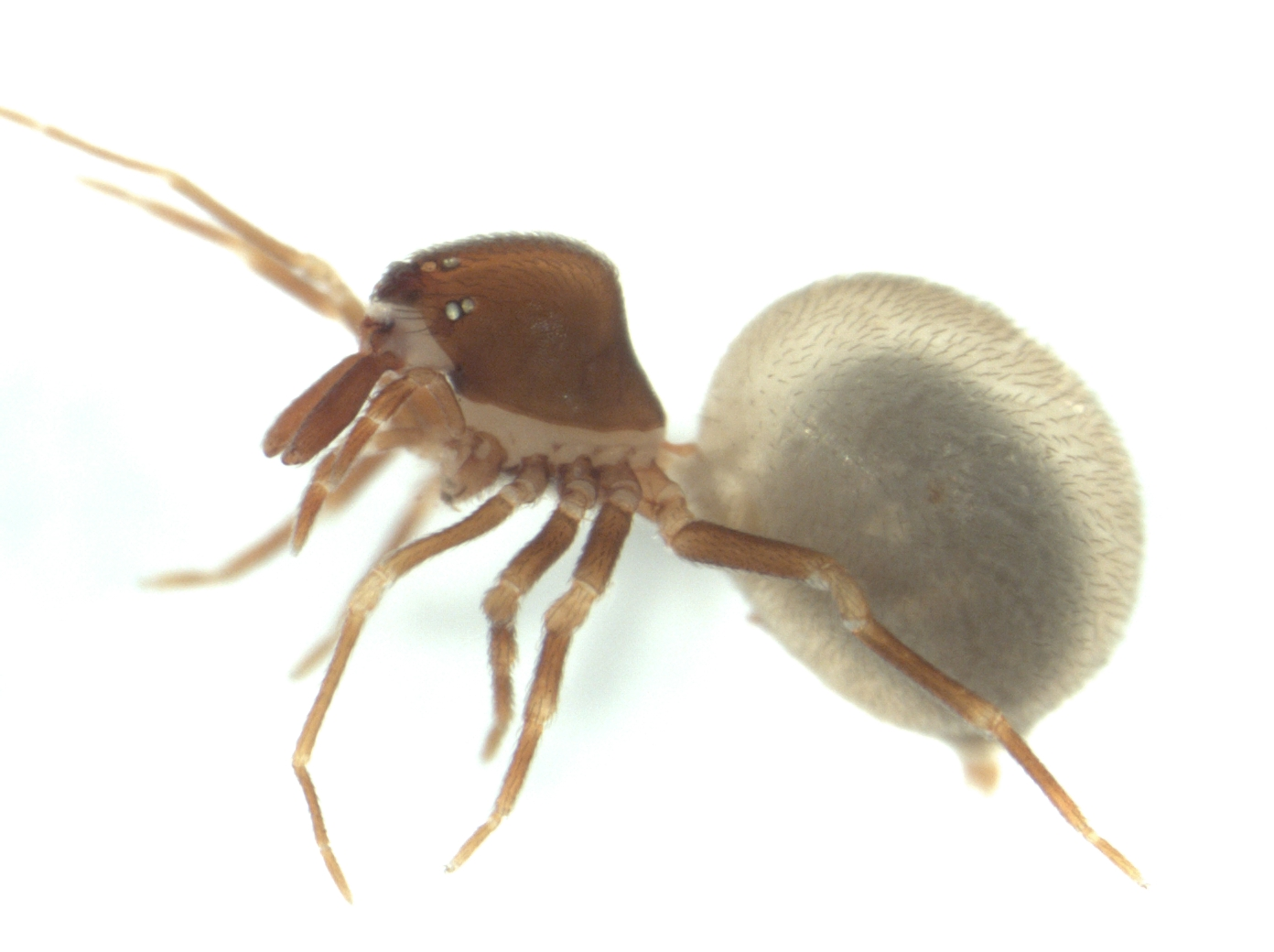

Conservation status
- Not Threatened (NZ TCS)

Scientific classification
- Kingdom: Animalia
- Phylum: Arthropoda
- Subphylum: Chelicerata
- Class: Arachnida
- Order: Araneae
- Infraorder: Araneomorphae
- Family: Mecysmaucheniidae
- Genus: Zearchaea
- Species: Z. clypeata

Binomial name
- Zearchaea clypeata Wilton, 1946

= Zearchaea clypeata =

Species of spider

Zearchaea clypeata is a species of Mecysmaucheniidae spider that is endemic to New Zealand.

== Taxonomy ==
This species was described in 1946 by Cecil Louis Wilton from female and male specimens collected in Masterton. It was then later redescribed in 1955. The holotype is stored in Te Papa Museum under registration number AS.000017.

== Description ==
The female is recorded at 2.2mm in length whereas the male is 1.5mm. This species has an orange brown cephalothorax and a creamy grey abdomen.

== Distribution ==
This species is only known from scattered localities in the North Island and the South Island of New Zealand.

== Conservation status ==
Under the New Zealand Threat Classification System, this species is listed as "Not Threatened".
