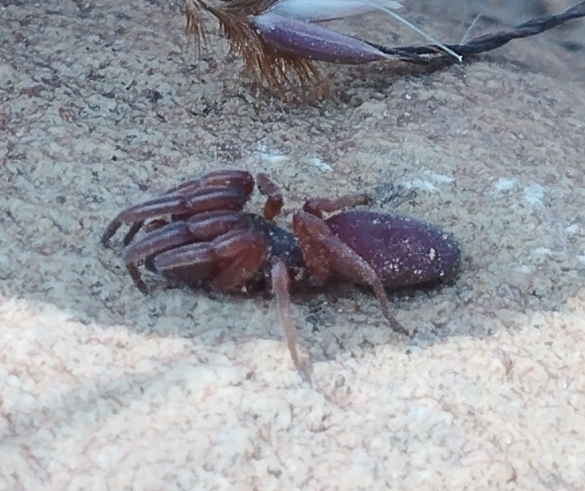
- Stenochilus sp. in India

Scientific classification
- Kingdom: Animalia
- Phylum: Arthropoda
- Subphylum: Chelicerata
- Class: Arachnida
- Order: Araneae
- Infraorder: Araneomorphae
- Superfamily: Palpimanoidea
- Family: Stenochilidae; Thorell, 1873

Genera
- Colopea Simon, 1893; Stenochilus O. Pickard-Cambridge, 1871

Diversity
- 2 genera, 13 species
- blue: reported countries (WSC)

= Stenochilidae =

Family of spiders

Stenochilidae is a family of southeast Asian araneomorph spiders that produce ecribellate silk. First described by Tamerlan Thorell in 1873, it now contains thirteen described species in two genera.

== Etymology ==
The family name Stenochilidae is derived from the type genus Stenochilus, which comes from the Greek words στενός (narrow) and χεῖλος (lip), referring to the narrow labium characteristic of these spiders.

== Distribution ==
Stenochilidae has a restricted distribution in the Oriental realm, ranging from India in the west to Fiji in the east. The family has been recorded from South and Southeast Asia (India, Sri Lanka, Myanmar, Cambodia, Thailand, Malaysia, Singapore, China, Philippines) and Oceania (Borneo, Bali, New Guinea, Fiji).

The westernmost record is Stenochilus hobsoni from Iraq, representing the first record of the family in the Middle East.

== Description ==
Stenochilidae are small spiders with a total length of 3.5–10 mm. They are instantly recognizable by their uniquely diamond-shaped carapace, which is widest behind coxae II and heavily tuberculate. The carapace is simple in outline in Colopea but modified with numerous undulations in Stenochilus. Unlike most spiders, stenochilids have two thoracic grooves rather than one – generally an anterior groove and a posterior pit.

The eye arrangement resembles that of prodidomids and some zodariids, with the eyes of the right and left sides forming single, continuous, gently curved rows. In four of the five known species at the time of Platnick & Shadab's revision, the posterior median eyes are unusually elongate, twice the size of the others. The anterior eye row is slightly recurved while the posterior row is strongly procurved.

The chelicerae are light red and lack marginal teeth, but possess a basal lamella and lateral stridulating files. The labium is elongate and completely fused to the sternum, unlike in Palpimanidae where it is free. The sternum has pronounced anterolateral elevations and sclerotized extensions surrounding the coxae.

A diagnostic feature is the presence of only two large spinnerets plus remnants of four posterior spinnerets. In males, these remnants appear nonfunctional and lack spigots, but in females they are larger, equipped with spigots, and fused into a platelike structure resembling a cribellum.

The leg formula is 1243, with both legs I and II enlarged and bearing divided prolateral scopulae on the metatarsi. Unlike Palpimanidae, the relative leg segment lengths are those of typical spiders, and the scopulae are divided into large prolateral and small ventral portions. The tarsi have two dentate claws and a protruding onychium, with claws reduced in size on legs I and II.

The opisthosoma is pale yellow with two brown oblique dorsal muscle impressions and is coated with dark spine-like setae. The abdominal scutum is restricted to the ventral surface only, unlike the ring-like structure found in Palpimanidae.

Male genitalia show remarkable diversity between the two genera. Stenochilus males have entelegyne palpi with hematodochae, an embolus, and accessory sclerites. Colopea males have a unique condition with hematodochae but lack an embolus entirely – a secondary reduction in complexity. Females of both genera lack an external epigyne and have haplogyne-type genitalia, with Stenochilus possessing unpaired median spermathecae and Colopea having paired spermathecae.

== Taxonomy ==
Stenochilidae was originally described as a family (Stenochiloidae) by Thorell in 1873, but Simon demoted it to a subfamily of Palpimanidae in 1893. In their comprehensive 1974 revision, Platnick and Shadab re-established the family status based on several morphological differences that distinguish Stenochilidae from Palpimanidae. These include the presence of prolateral leg scopulae (a shared derived character), differences in carapace shape, number of thoracic grooves, eye pattern, cheliceral dentition, labial structure, extent of the abdominal scutum, number of spinnerets, relative leg segment lengths, and genitalia.

The family was significantly expanded by Pekka Lehtinen in 1982, who described several new species of Colopea and provided detailed morphological descriptions.

== Genera ==
As of January 2026, this family includes two genera and thirteen species:

- Colopea Simon, 1893 – Asia, Fiji, New Guinea, Bali, Borneo
- Stenochilus O. Pickard-Cambridge, 1871 – Cambodia, Myanmar, India, Sri Lanka, Iraq

== See also ==
- Penney, D. (2004). "Cretaceous Canadian amber spider and the palpimanoidean nature of lagonomegopids" (PDF). Acta Palaeontologica Polonica. 49 (4): 579–584. Archived from the original (PDF) on 2005-12-31.
