= Vaga =

Vaga may refer to:

== Places ==
- Vaga (Tunisia), an ancient city and former bishopric in Tunisia, now the city of Béja and a Latin Catholic titular see
- Vaga (river), a river in Russia
- Vaga (inhabited locality), several inhabited localities in Russia
- Vágar Municipality on the Faroe Islands (Vága kommuna, in Faroese language)
- Vågå Municipality, a municipality in Innlandet county, Norway
  - Vågå Church, a stave church in Vågå Municipality, Norway
- Vaga, Morovis, Puerto Rico, a barrio

== Other ==
- VAGA, artists' rights organization and copyright collective
- Vaga (publisher), Lithuanian book publisher
- Vaga (surname)
- Vaga, butterfly genus usually included as a subgenus of Udara today

== See also ==
- Våga (disambiguation)
- Vága (disambiguation)
