= Vazgen =

Vazgen (Armenian: Վազգեն) is a given name and may refer to:

- Vazgen I of Bucharest, born Levon Garabed Baljian (1908–1994), the Catholicos of All Armenians 1955–1994
- Vazgen Azrojan (born 1977), retired Armenian ice dancer
- Vazgen Manasyan (born 1958), Tajikistani professional football coach and a former player
- Vazgen Manukyan (born 1946), the first Prime Minister of Armenia, from 1990 to 1991
- Vazgen Muradian (1921–2018), Armenian born Armenian-American neo-classicist composer
- Vazgen Safarian (born 1954), retired Iranian Armenian football player
- Vazgen Safaryants (born 1984), Belarusian amateur boxer of Armenian origin
- Vazgen Sargsyan (1959–1999), Armenian military commander and politician

== See also ==
- Vazgen Sargsyan House-Museum, a house-museum located in the Ararat village of Ararat Province, Armenia
- Vazgen Sargsyan Republican Stadium also known as the Republican Stadium
- Vazgen Sargsyan Military University under the Ministry of Defense of Armenia
- Vagen (disambiguation)
- Vazgestan
