= Vagan =

Vagan may refer to:

== Places ==
- Vagan, Croatia, a ghost town in Croatia
- Vagan, Glamoč, a village in Bosnia and Herzegovina

== Other ==
- Vagan, also known as Dark Bean, is a character that appears as the main/secondary antagonist of Killer Bean Forever

== See also ==
- Vågan (disambiguation)
