= Våge =

Våge (or the older spelling Vaage) may refer to:

== Places ==
- Våge, Agder, a village in Lindesnes Municipality in Agder county, Norway
- Våge, Austevoll, a village in Austevoll Municipality in Vestland county, Norway
- Våge, Møre og Romsdal, a village in Sande Municipality in Møre og Romsdal county, Norway
- Våge, Nordland, a village in Lødingen Municipality in Nordland county, Norway
- Våge, Rogaland, a village in Karmøy Municipality in Rogaland county, Norway
- Våge, Tysnes, a village in Tysnes Municipality in Vestland county, Norway

== People ==
- Jakob Vaage, a Norwegian skier and historian
- Lars Vaage, a Norwegian physician and politician
- Lars Amund Vaage, a Norwegian author and playwright
- Ragnvald Vaage, a Norwegian farmer, poet, novelist, and children's writer

== See also ==
- Våga (disambiguation)
- Vågan (disambiguation)
- Vágar
- Vågen (disambiguation)
- Vague (disambiguation)
