= Våga =

Våga may refer to the following locations:

- Våga, Agder, a village in Lindesnes Municipality, Agder county, Norway
- Våga, Vestland, a village in Sveio Municipality, Vestland county, Norway
- Våga, or Vågaholmen, the administrative centre of Rødøy Municipality, Nordland county, Norway

== See also ==
- Våge (disambiguation)
- Vagen (disambiguation)
- Vågan (disambiguation)
- Vågen, Bergen
- Vågå Municipality
