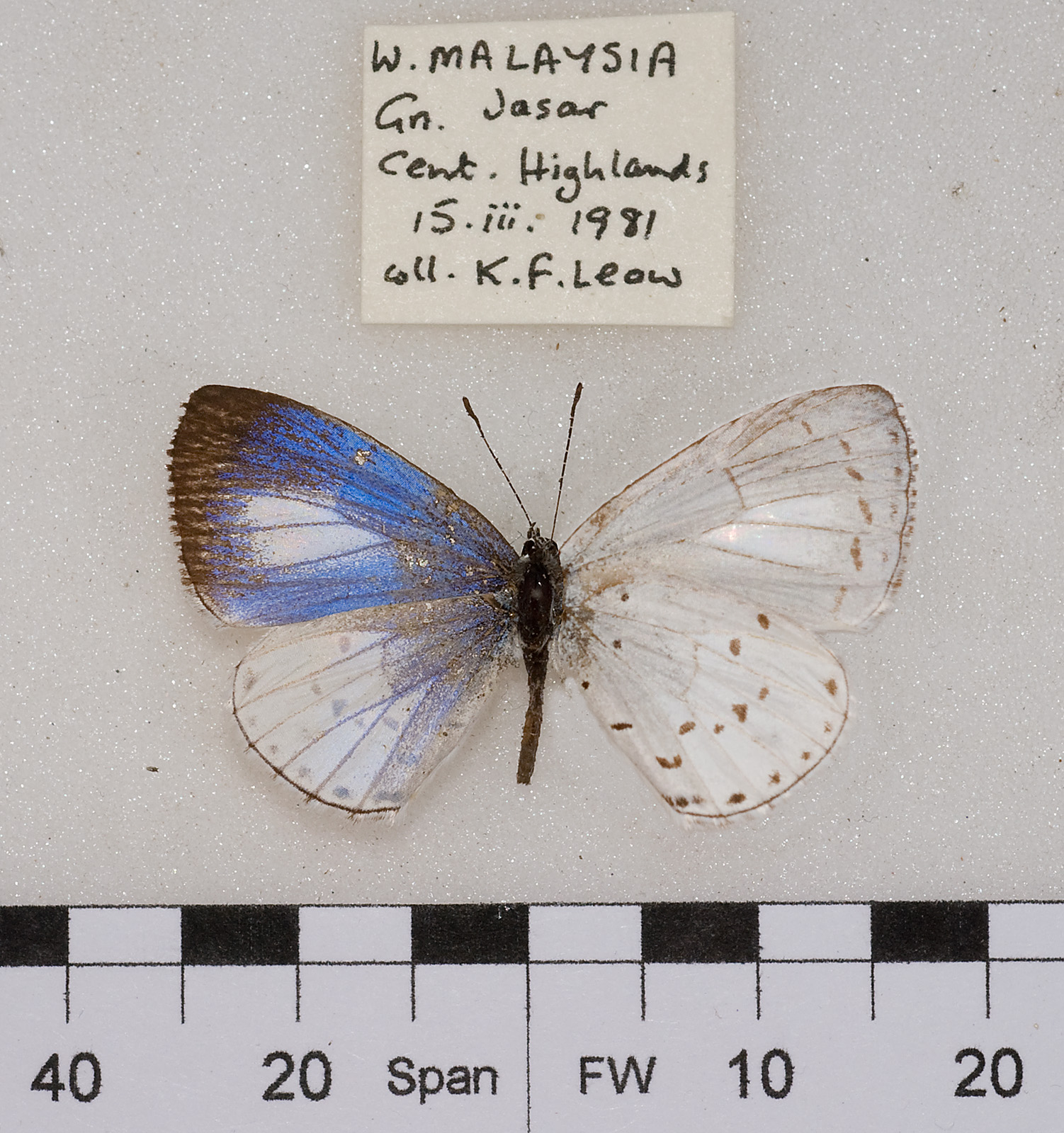
- U. a. sauteri

Scientific classification
- Kingdom: Animalia
- Phylum: Arthropoda
- Class: Insecta
- Order: Lepidoptera
- Family: Lycaenidae
- Genus: Udara
- Species: U. albocaerulea

Binomial name
- Udara albocaerulea (Moore, 1879)

Synonyms
- Polyommatus albocaeruleus Moore, 1879; Cyaniris albocaeruleus; Lycaenopsis albocaerulea; Celastrina albocaerulea; Cyaniris ceyx amadis Fruhstorfer, 1910; Lycaenopsis albocoeruleus sauteri Fruhstorfer, 1917; Celastrina scharffi Corbet, 1937; Celastrina albocaerulea yamanotoi Murayama, 1953

= Udara albocaerulea =

Species of butterfly

Udara albocaerulea, the albocerulean, is a butterfly of the family Lycaenidae. It was described by Frederic Moore in 1879. It is found from India (Simla to Assam) to Myanmar, Malaysia, Hong Kong, Taiwan and Japan.

== Subspecies ==
- U. a. albocaerulea (Yunnan)
- U. a. scharffi (Corbet, 1937) (western Malaysia)
- U. a. sauteri (Fruhstorfer, 1917) (Taiwan) (Udara sauteri is a synonym of Udara albocaerulea))
- U. a. yamanotoi (Murayama, 1953) (Japan)
