= Ararat (village), Armenia =

Village in Ararat, Armenia

Ararat Արարատ
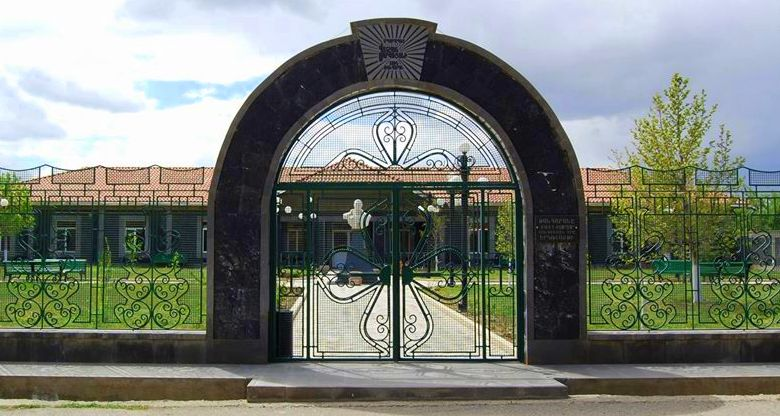
- The House-Museum of Vazgen Sargsyan in Ararat

- Location within Armenia Location within Ararat
- Coordinates: 39°49′49″N 44°42′09″E
- Country: Armenia
- Province: Ararat
- Municipality: Ararat
- Founded: 1828

Population (2011)
  - Total: 7,609
- Time zone: UTC+4
  - Summer (DST): UTC+5

Ararat (Armenian: Արարատ) is a village in the Ararat Municipality of the Ararat Province of Armenia, located 14 km south of the provincial centre Artashat. In the 2011 census, the village had a population of 7,609.

It hosted to the first CYMA – Canadian Youth Mission to Armenia led by Ronald Alepian in 1993. The village is home to the Vazgen Sargsyan House-Museum.

== Famous natives ==
- Vazgen Sargsyan, assassinated Prime Minister of Armenia.
- Aram Sargsyan, former Prime Minister of Armenia.
