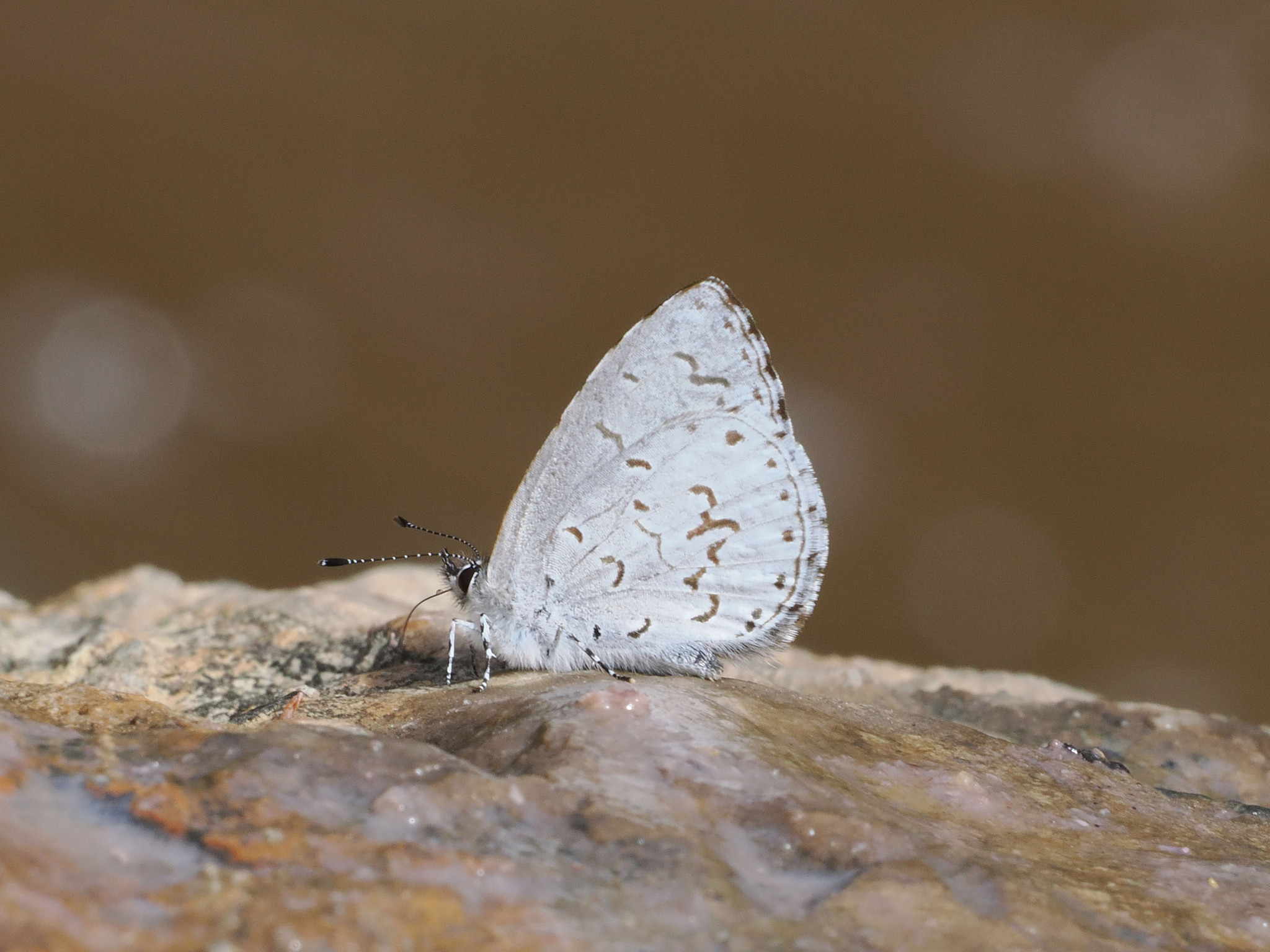

Scientific classification
- Domain: Eukaryota
- Kingdom: Animalia
- Phylum: Arthropoda
- Class: Insecta
- Order: Lepidoptera
- Family: Lycaenidae
- Genus: Udara
- Species: U. drucei

Binomial name
- Udara drucei (Bethune-Baker, 1906)

Synonyms
- Cyaniris drucei Bethune-Baker, 1906; Lycaenopsis drucei; Cyaniris ogwarra parvipuncta Rothschild, 1915

= Udara drucei =

Species of butterfly

Udara drucei is a species of butterfly of the family Lycaenidae. It is found in New Guinea.

== Subspecies ==
- Udara drucei drucei (Papua New Guinea: Owgarra, Aroa)
- Udara drucei tennenti Müller, 2002 (New Ireland)
