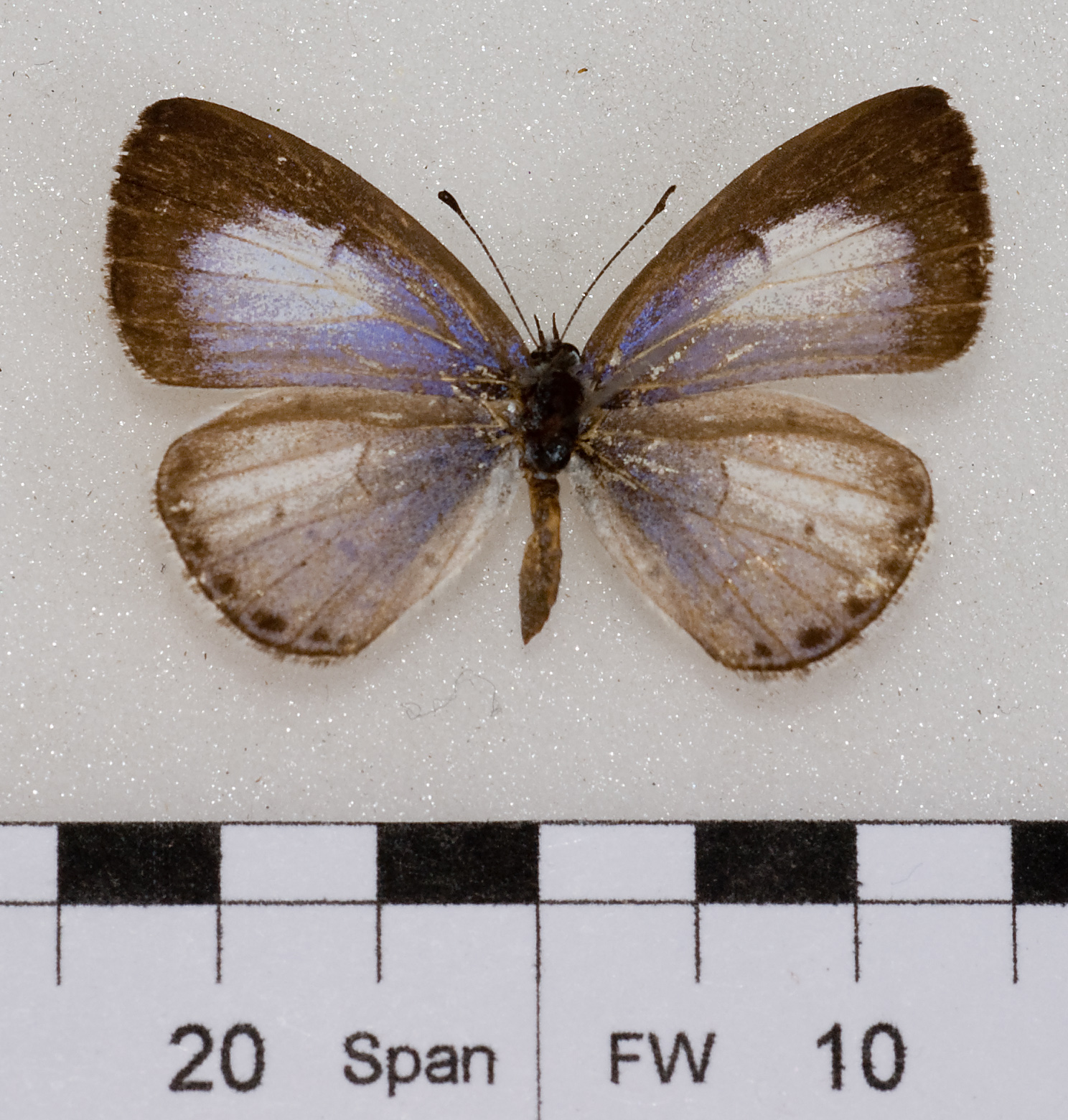

Scientific classification
- Kingdom: Animalia
- Phylum: Arthropoda
- Class: Insecta
- Order: Lepidoptera
- Family: Lycaenidae
- Genus: Udara
- Species: U. aristinus

Binomial name
- Udara aristinus (Fruhstorfer, 1917)

Synonyms
- Lycaenopsis aristius aristinus Fruhstorfer, 1917; Celastrina aristinus klossi Corbet, 1937

= Udara aristinus =

Species of butterfly

Udara aristinus is a butterfly in the family Lycaenidae, first described by Hans Fruhstorfer in 1917. It is found in the Indomalayan realm, where it has been recorded from Malaysia and Java. Fruhstorfer in Seitz ( page 864 ) provides a description differentiating aristinus from nearby taxa.
