= Vague (disambiguation) =

Vagueness is a problem in semantics, metaphysics and philosophical logic.

Vague may also refer to:

- Vagueness doctrine, a constitutional doctrine which prohibits unclearly written laws in the United States
- Vague (club), a club night in Leeds, England in the 1990s
- Richard Vague (born 1956), American businessperson, author, and formerly Pennsylvania's Secretary of Banking and Securities
- Rhys Vague (born 1996), American basketball player
- "Vague", a 1994 song by the indie rock band Blonde Redhead
- "Vague", a song by the industrial rock band Orgy from their 2004 album Punk Statik Paranoia
- Vera Vague, a character played by the American actor Barbara Jo Allen (1906–1974)

== See also ==
- Våge (disambiguation)
