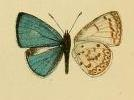

Scientific classification
- Domain: Eukaryota
- Kingdom: Animalia
- Phylum: Arthropoda
- Class: Insecta
- Order: Lepidoptera
- Family: Lycaenidae
- Genus: Udara
- Species: U. owgarra

Binomial name
- Udara owgarra (Bethune-Baker, 1906)

Synonyms
- Candalides owgarra Bethune-Baker, 1906; Parelodina mima Joicey & Talbot, 1916

= Udara owgarra =

Species of butterfly

Udara owgarra is a species of butterfly of the family Lycaenidae. It is found in New Guinea.

== Subspecies ==
- Udara owgarra owgarra (Papua New Guinea: Owgarra)
- Udara owgarra mima (Joicey & Talbot, 1916) (West Irian: Wandammen Mountains)
