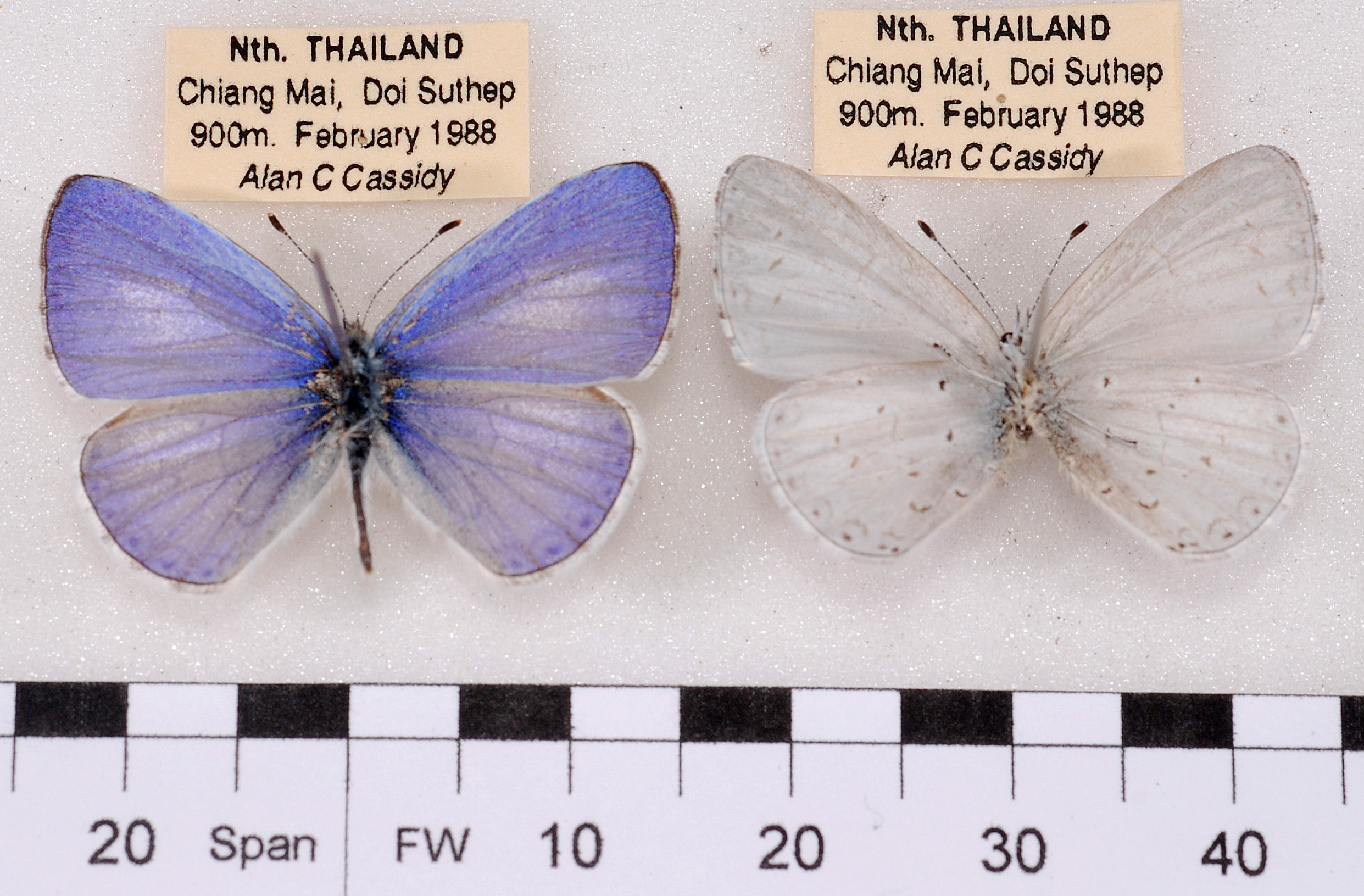
- Male Udara (Udara) dilecta dilecta from Thailand, type species of Udara
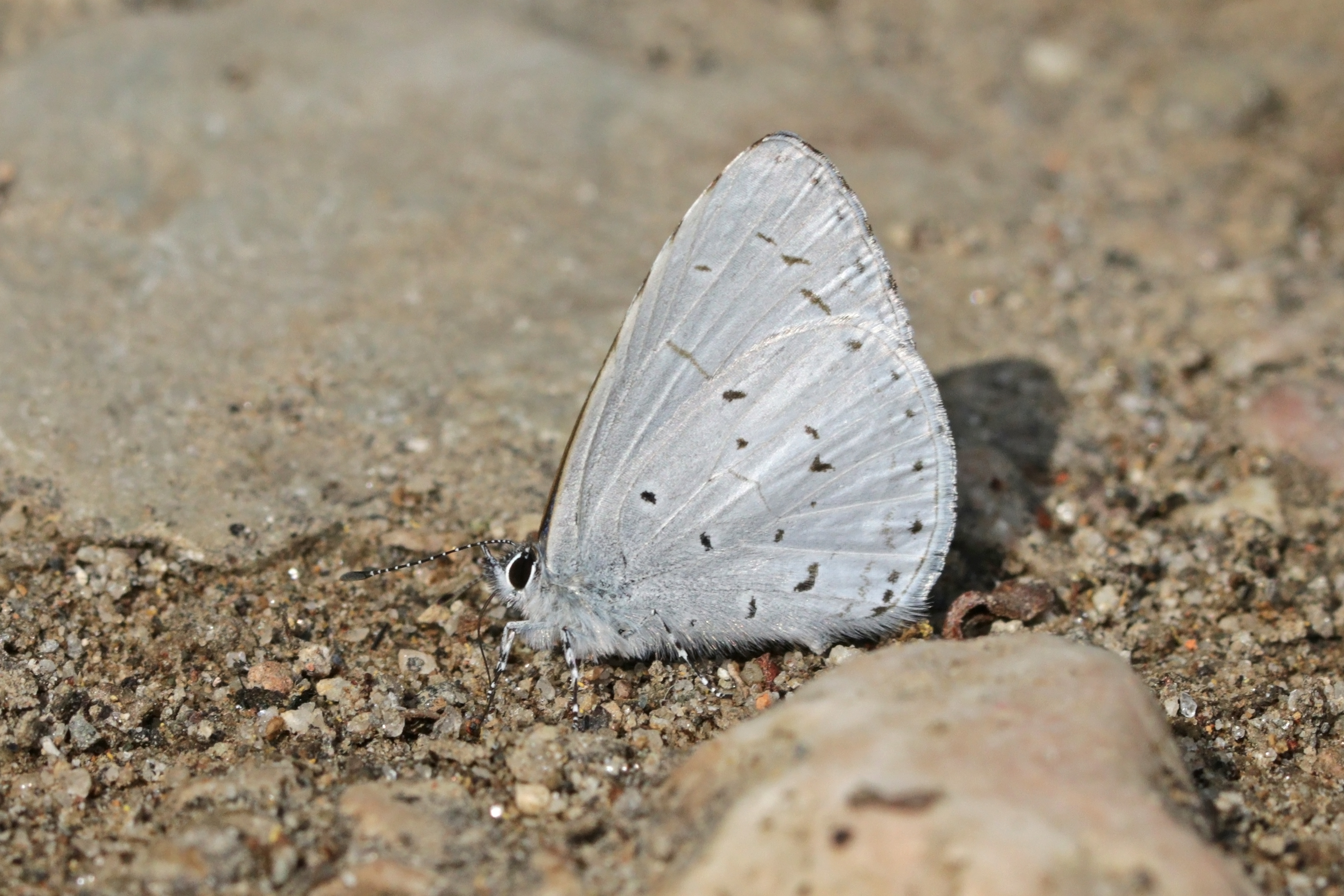
- In Nepal

Scientific classification
- Domain: Eukaryota
- Kingdom: Animalia
- Phylum: Arthropoda
- Class: Insecta
- Order: Lepidoptera
- Family: Lycaenidae
- Genus: Udara
- Species: U. dilecta

Binomial name
- Udara dilecta (Moore, 1879)

= Udara dilecta =

Pale hedge blue

Species of butterfly

Udara dilecta, the pale hedge blue or Himalayan pale hedge blue, is a small butterfly found in India, Nepal, China, and Malaya that belongs to the lycaenids or blues family. The species was first described by Frederic Moore in 1879.

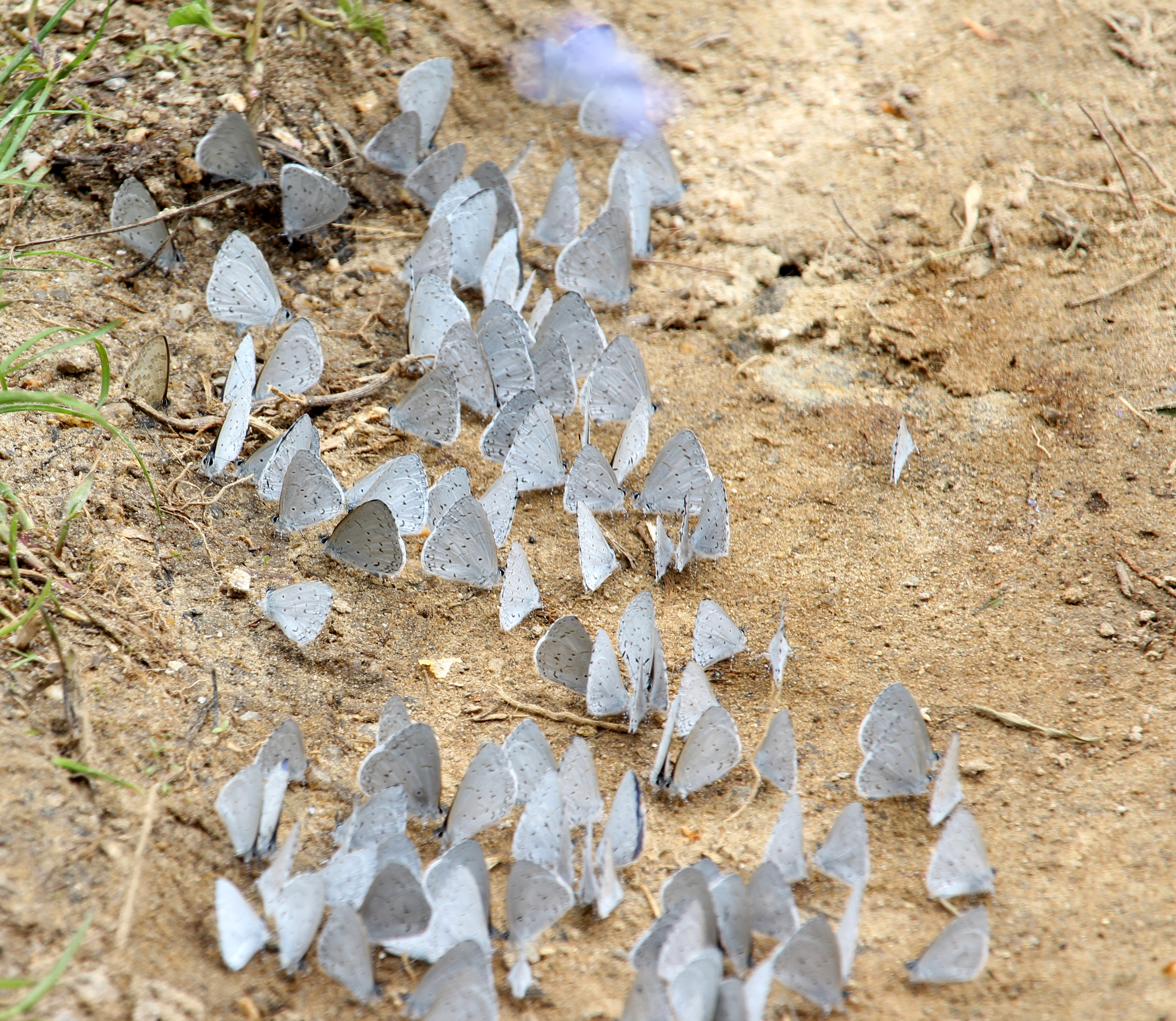
Mud-puddling

== Taxonomy ==
If adopting the common practice of many Lepidopterists to use the original gender of the species name, here the formation of the scientific name can instead be Udara dilectus (Moore, 1879).
