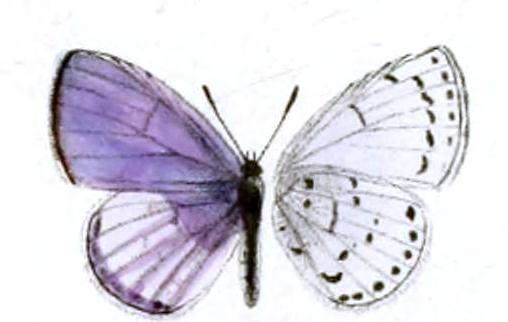
- Male
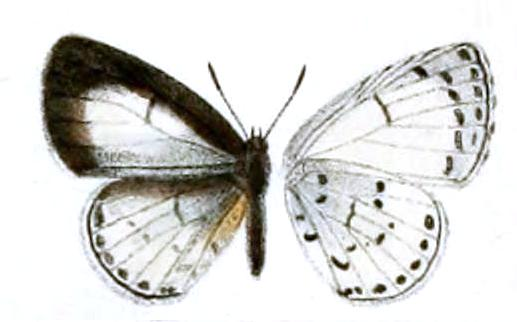
- Female

Scientific classification
- Domain: Eukaryota
- Kingdom: Animalia
- Phylum: Arthropoda
- Class: Insecta
- Order: Lepidoptera
- Family: Lycaenidae
- Genus: Udara
- Species: U. dilectissima

Binomial name
- Udara dilectissima (H.H.Druce, 1895)

Synonyms
- Cyaniris dilectissima H.H.Druce, 1895; Lycaenopsis dilectissima (H.H.Druce) Chapman, 1909; Lycaenopsis ceyx dilectissima (Druce); Fruhstorfer, 1922; Celastrina dilectissima dilectissima (Druce) Barlow, Banks & Holloway, 1971

= Udara dilectissima =

Species of butterfly

Udara dilectissima is a species of butterfly of the family Lycaenidae. It is found in South-east Asia.

== Subspecies ==
- Udara dilectissima dilectissima (Borneo)
- Udara dilectissima luzona Eliot and Kawazoé, 1983 (Philippines: Luzon)
