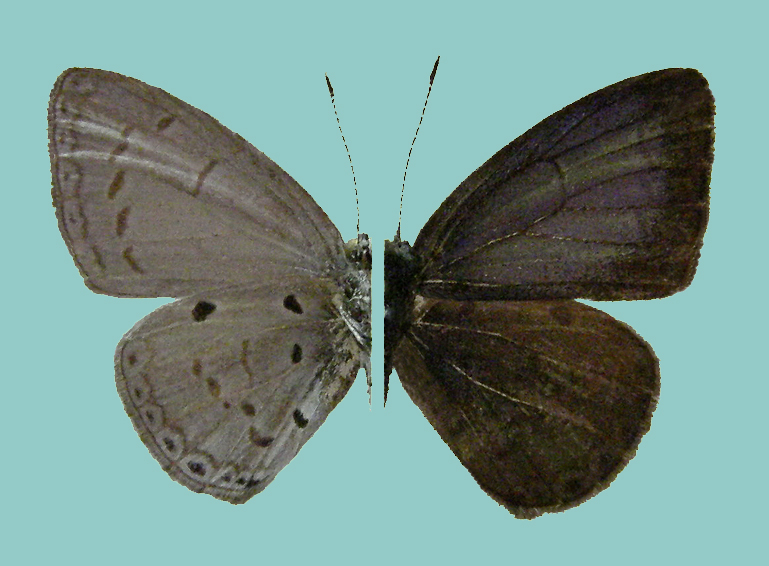

Scientific classification
- Domain: Eukaryota
- Kingdom: Animalia
- Phylum: Arthropoda
- Class: Insecta
- Order: Lepidoptera
- Family: Lycaenidae
- Genus: Udara
- Species: U. cyma

Binomial name
- Udara cyma (Toxopeus, 1927)

Synonyms
- Celastrina cyma Toxopeus, 1927

= Udara cyma =

Species of butterfly

Udara cyma is a butterfly in the family Lycaenidae. It was described by Lambertus Johannes Toxopeus in 1927. It is found in the Indomalayan realm.

== Subspecies ==
- Udara cyma cyma (southern Burma, Thailand, Malay Peninsula, Borneo, Sumatra)
- Udara cyma elioti H.Hayashi, 1976 (Palawan)
