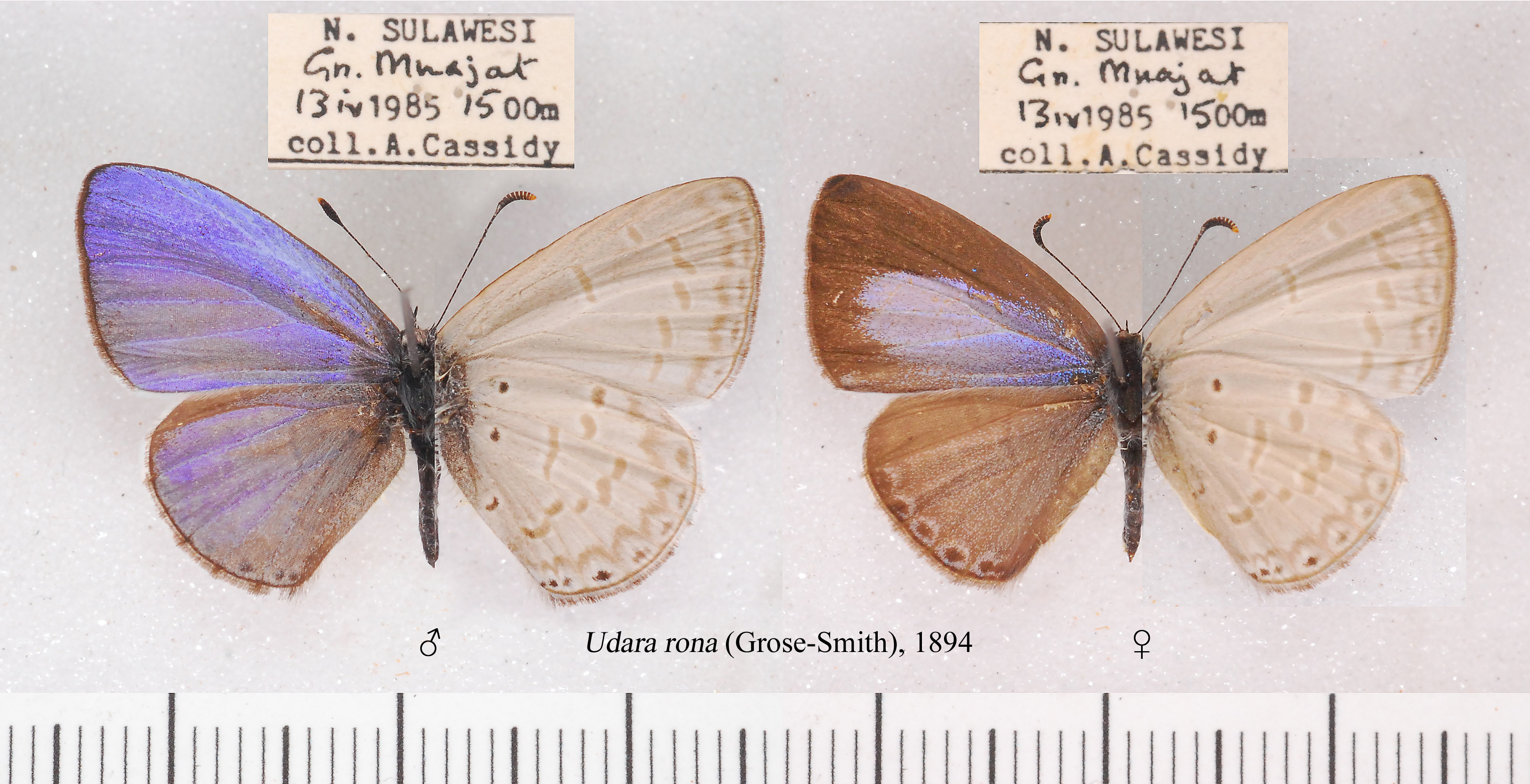

Scientific classification
- Domain: Eukaryota
- Kingdom: Animalia
- Phylum: Arthropoda
- Class: Insecta
- Order: Lepidoptera
- Family: Lycaenidae
- Genus: Udara
- Species: U. rona

Binomial name
- Udara rona (Grose-Smith, 1894)

Synonyms
- Cyaniris rona Grose-Smith, 1894; Cyaniris beretava Ribbe, 1899; Cyaniris biagi Bethune-Baker, 1908; Celastrina (Udara) singalensis thorida Toxopeus, 1928; Cyaniris singalensis catius Fruhstorfer, 1910; Cyaniris singalensis astarga Fruhstorfer, 1910; Lycaenopsis cardia catius f. catius Fruhstorfer, 1917; Lycaenopsis cardia astarga f. astarga Fruhstorfer, 1917; Cleastrina (Udara) singalensis astarga Toxopeus, 1928; Celastrina singalensis xanthippe Corbet, 1937; Celsatrina rona xanthippe Eliot, 1978

= Udara rona =

Species of butterfly

Udara rona is a species of butterfly of the family Lycaenidae. It is found in South-east Asia.

== Subspecies ==
- Udara rona rona (Sulaweis, Maluku, New Guinea, New Britain)
- Udara rona catius (Fruhstorfer, 1910) (north-eastern Sumatra)
- Udara rona imeldae Schröder & Treadaway, 1998 (Philippines)
