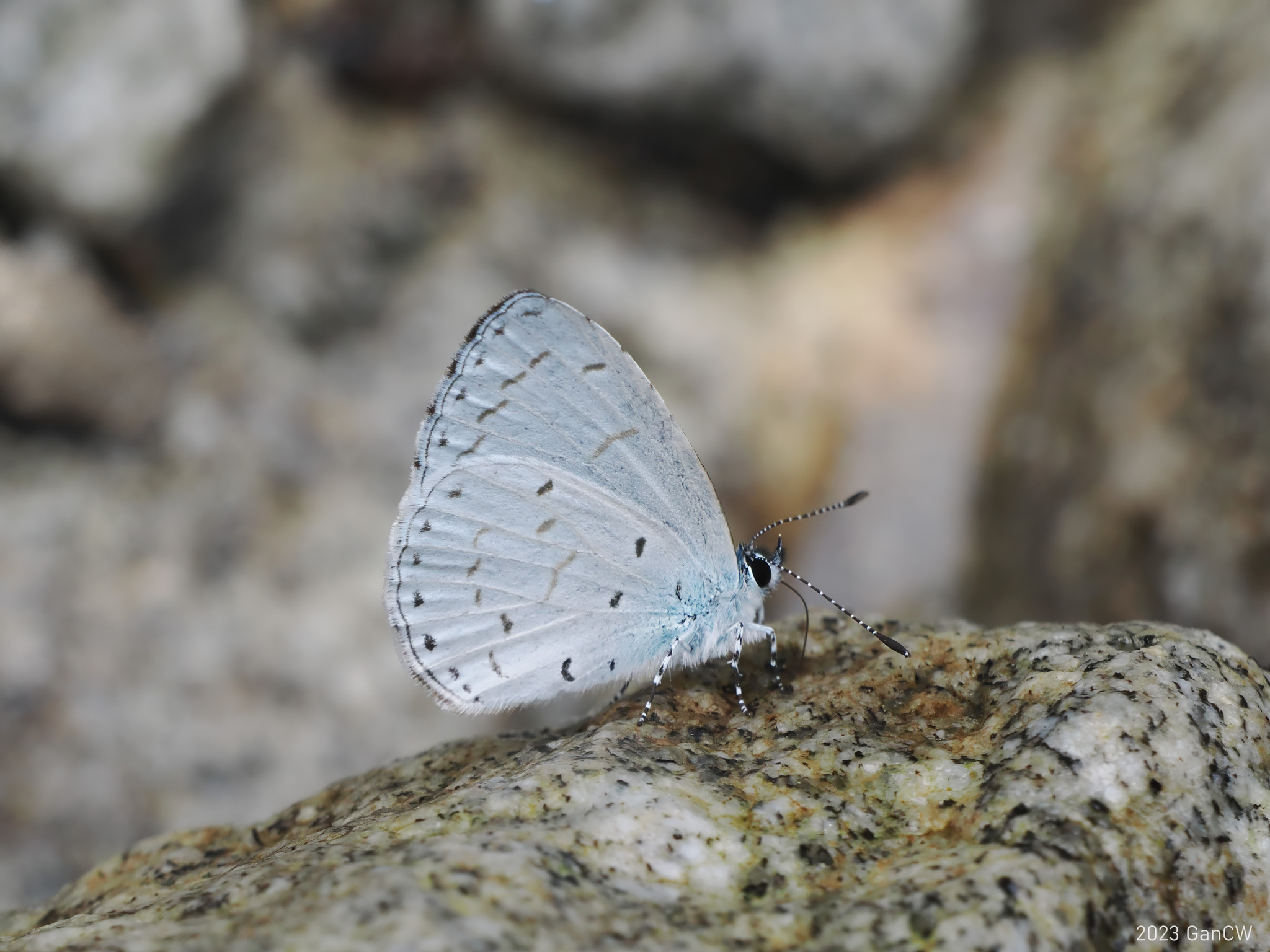

Scientific classification
- Domain: Eukaryota
- Kingdom: Animalia
- Phylum: Arthropoda
- Class: Insecta
- Order: Lepidoptera
- Family: Lycaenidae
- Genus: Udara
- Species: U. camenae

Binomial name
- Udara camenae (de Nicéville, 1895)

Synonyms
- Cyaniris camenae de Nicéville, 1895; Lycaenopisi camenae camenae; Celastrina camenae camenae; Cyaniris singalensis euphon Fruhstorfer, 1910; Cyaniris camenae valeria Fruhstorfer, 1910; Lycaenopsis strophis euphon (Fruhstorfer) Fruhstorfer, 1917; Lycaenopsis camenae valeria (Fruhstorfer) Fruhstorfer, 1917; Celastrina strophis filipina Murayama and Okamura, 1973; Cyaniris camenae de Nicéville, 1895; Lycaenopsis camenae (de Nicéville) Chapman, 1909; Celastrina camenae pendleburyi Corbet, 1937; Cyaniris strophis H. H. Druce, 1895; Lycaenopsis strophis strophis (Druce) Fruhstorfer, 1917; Celastrina camenae strophis

= Udara camenae =

Species of butterfly

Udara camenae is a butterfly of the family Lycaenidae. It is found in South-east Asia.

== Subspecies ==
- U. c. camenae (Sumatra)
- U. c. euphon (Fruhstorfer, 1910) (Sulawesi)
- U. c. filipina (Murayama and Okamura, 1973) (Philippines: Luzon)
- U. c. mansuela Eliot and Kawazoé, 1983 (Serang: Ceram)
- U. c. pendleburyi (Corbet, 1937) (western Malaysia)
- U. c. strophis (H.H.Druce, 1895) (Borneo)
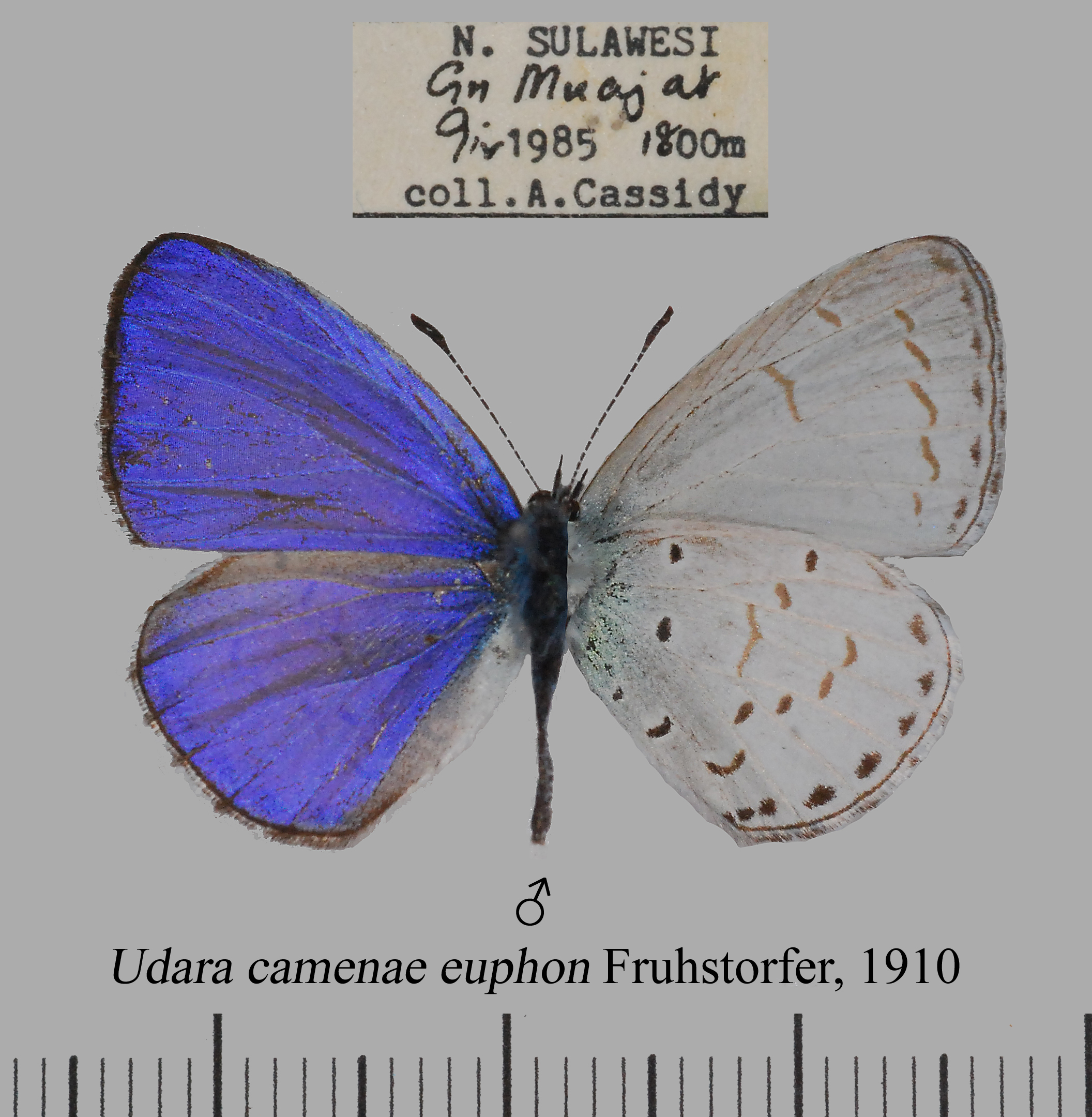
U. c. euphon

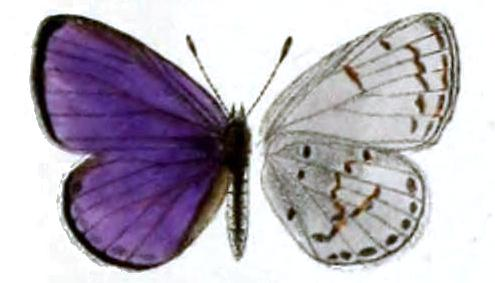
U. c. strophis
