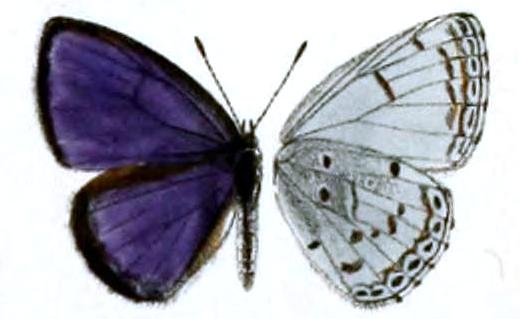
- Male
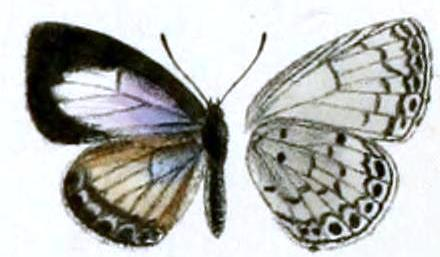
- Female

Scientific classification
- Domain: Eukaryota
- Kingdom: Animalia
- Phylum: Arthropoda
- Class: Insecta
- Order: Lepidoptera
- Family: Lycaenidae
- Genus: Udara
- Species: U. placidula

Binomial name
- Udara placidula H.H.Druce, 1895

Synonyms
- Cyaniris placidula H.H.Druce, 1895; Cyaniris puspa calata Fruhstorfer, 1910; Celastrina placidula confusa Toxopeus MS, 1930; Celastrina howarthi Cantlie and Norman, 1960; Celastrina placidula intensa Toxopeus, 1928; Lycaenopsis tenella var. placidula (H.H.Druce); Chapman, 1910; Celastrina placidula irenae Corbet, 1937; Cyaniris lyseas Grose-Smith, 1895; Lycaenopsis snelleni Toxopeus, 1926; Celsatrina (Udara) placidula snelleni (Toxopeus) Toxopeus, 1928

= Udara placidula =

Species of butterfly

Udara placidula is a butterfly of the family Lycaenidae. It is found in South-east Asia.

== Subspecies ==
- U. p. placidula (Borneo)
- U. p. calata (Fruhstorfer, 1910) (Flores)
- U. p. confusa Eliot and Kawazoé, 1983 (Moluccas: Buru)
- U. p. howarthi (Cantlie and Norman, 1960) (Assam to Burma, Thailand, Laos)
- U. p. intensa (Toxopeus, 1928) (Sumatra)
- U. p. irenae (Corbet, 1937) (western Malaysia)
- U. p. kawazoei H. Hayashi, 1976 (Philippines: Palawan)
- U. p. lyseas (Grose-Smith, 1895) (Moluccas: Batjan)
- U. p. snelleni (Toxopeus, 1926) (Java)
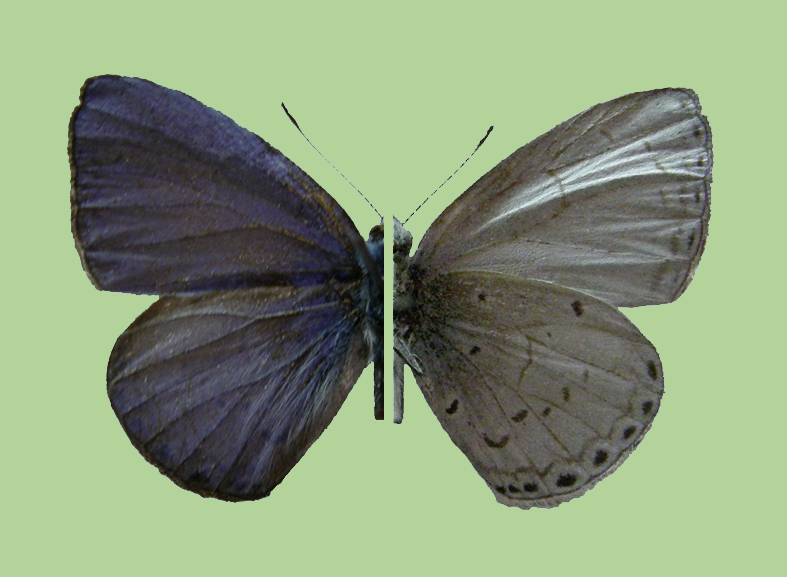
U. p. kawazoei, male

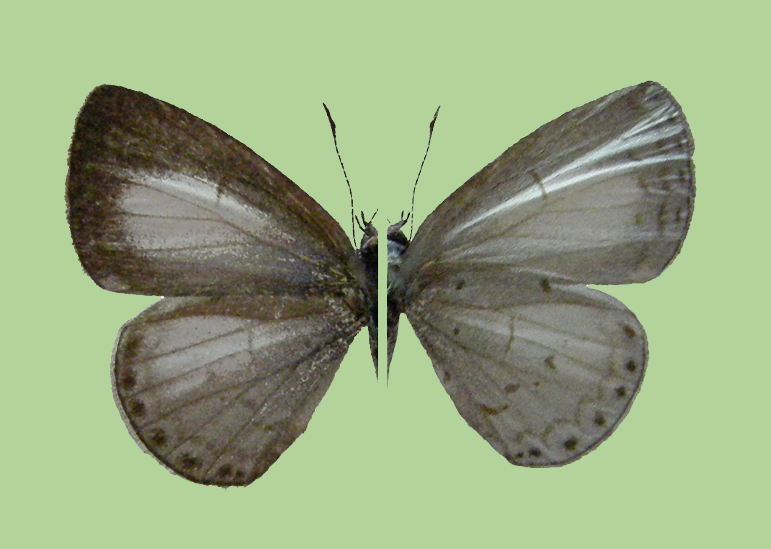
U. p. kawazoei, female

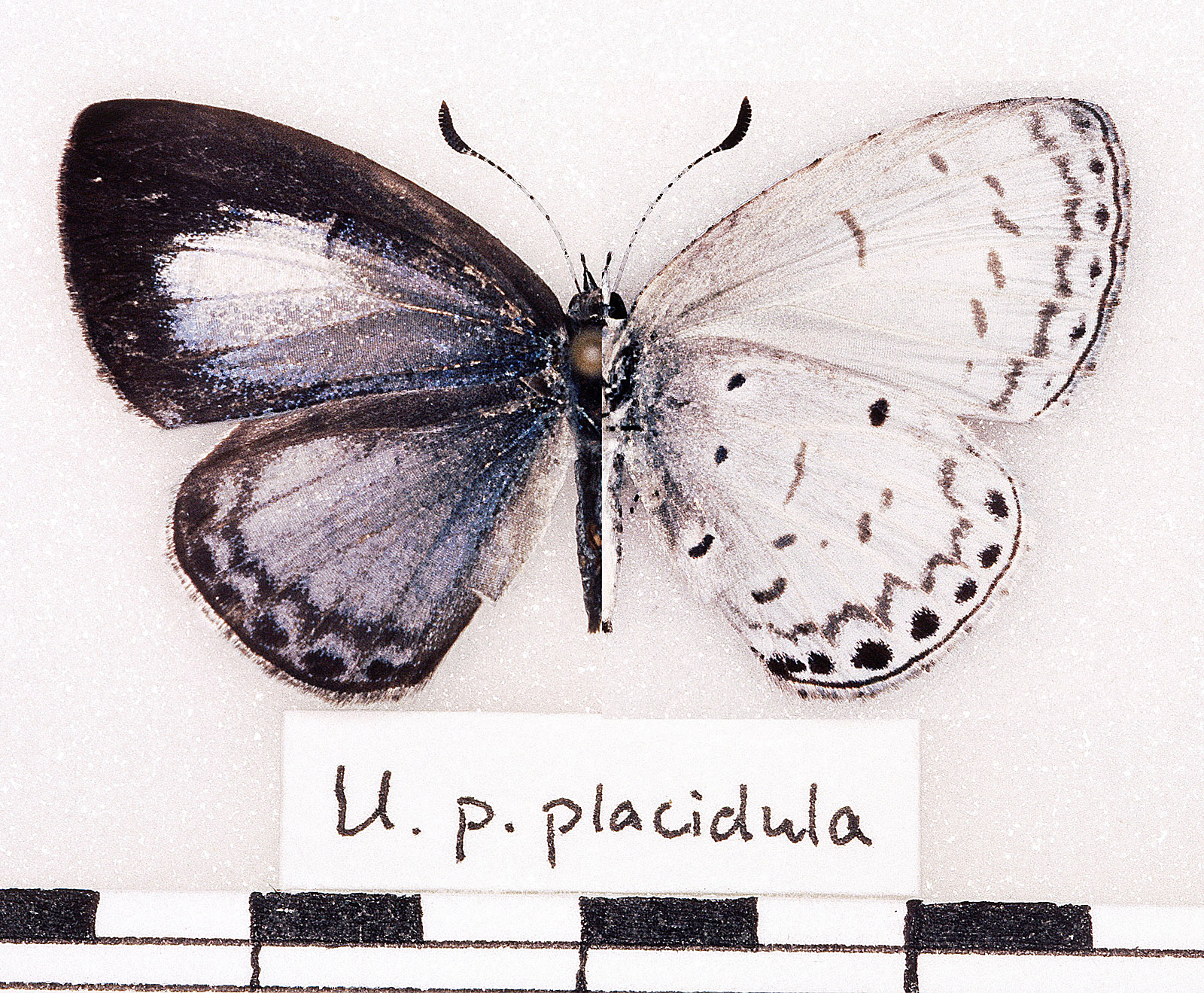
U. p. placidula
