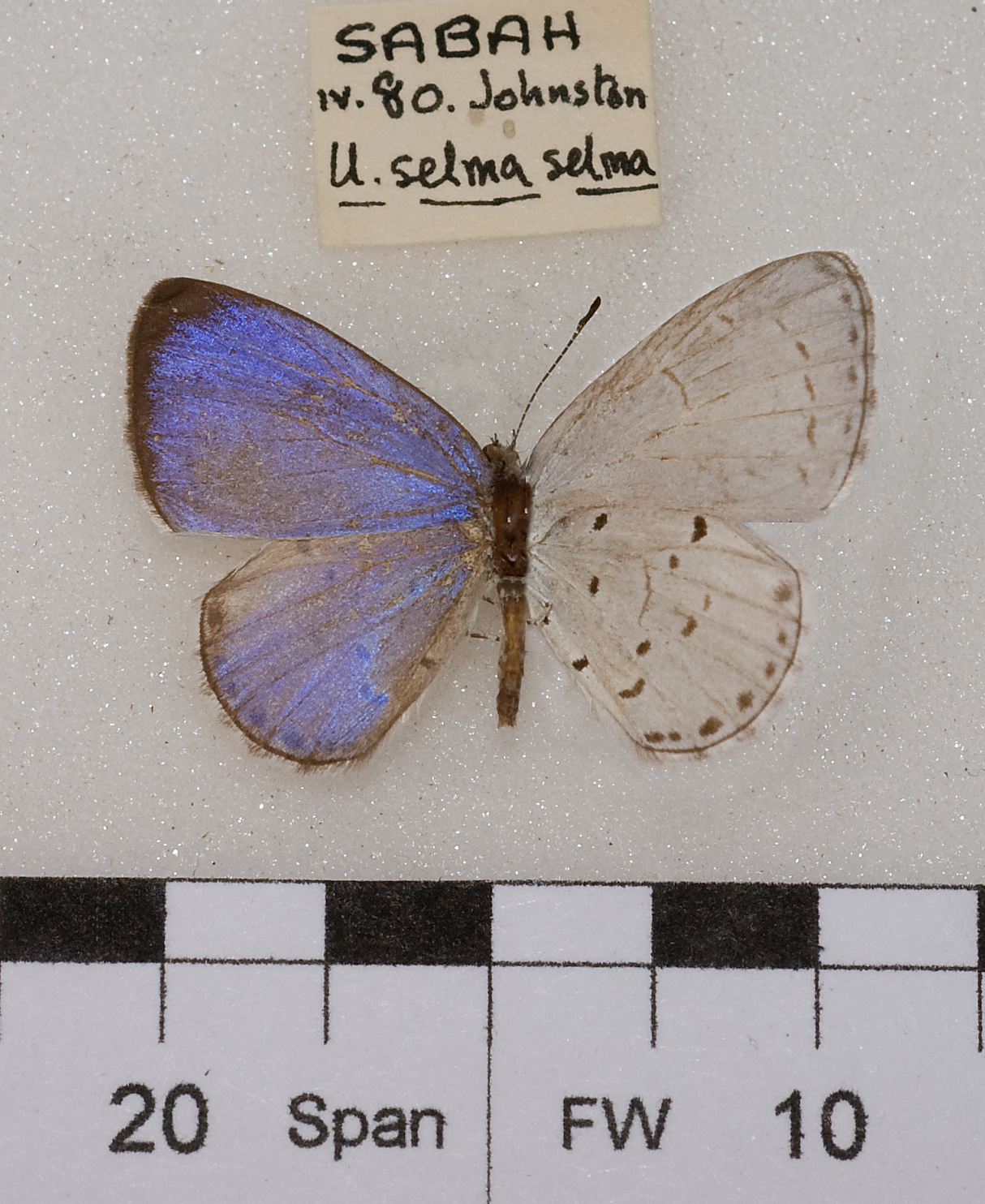
- U. s. selma

Scientific classification
- Domain: Eukaryota
- Kingdom: Animalia
- Phylum: Arthropoda
- Class: Insecta
- Order: Lepidoptera
- Family: Lycaenidae
- Genus: Udara
- Species: U. selma

Binomial name
- Udara selma (H.H.Druce, 1895)

Synonyms
- Cyaniris selma H. H. Druce, 1895; Cyaniris ceyx cerima Corbet, 1937; Lycaenopsis ceyx cerima; Cyaniris albidisca elothales Fruhstorfer, 1910; Cyaniris albidisca jugurtha Fruhstorfer, 1910; Lycaenopsis camenae elothales (Fruhstorfer) Fruhstorfer, 1917; Lycaenopsis camenae jugurtha (Fruhstorfer) Fruhstorfer, 1917; Celastrina (Akasinula) ceyx elothales (Fruhstorfer) Toxopeus, 1928; Celastrina (Akasinula) ceyx jugurtha; Celastrina ceyx tanarata (Druce) Corbet, 1937; Celastrina parvula Corbet, 1938; Celastrina selma tanarata Corbet Eliot. 1978

= Udara selma =

Species of butterfly

Udara selma is a species of butterfly of the family Lycaenidae. It is found in South-east Asia.

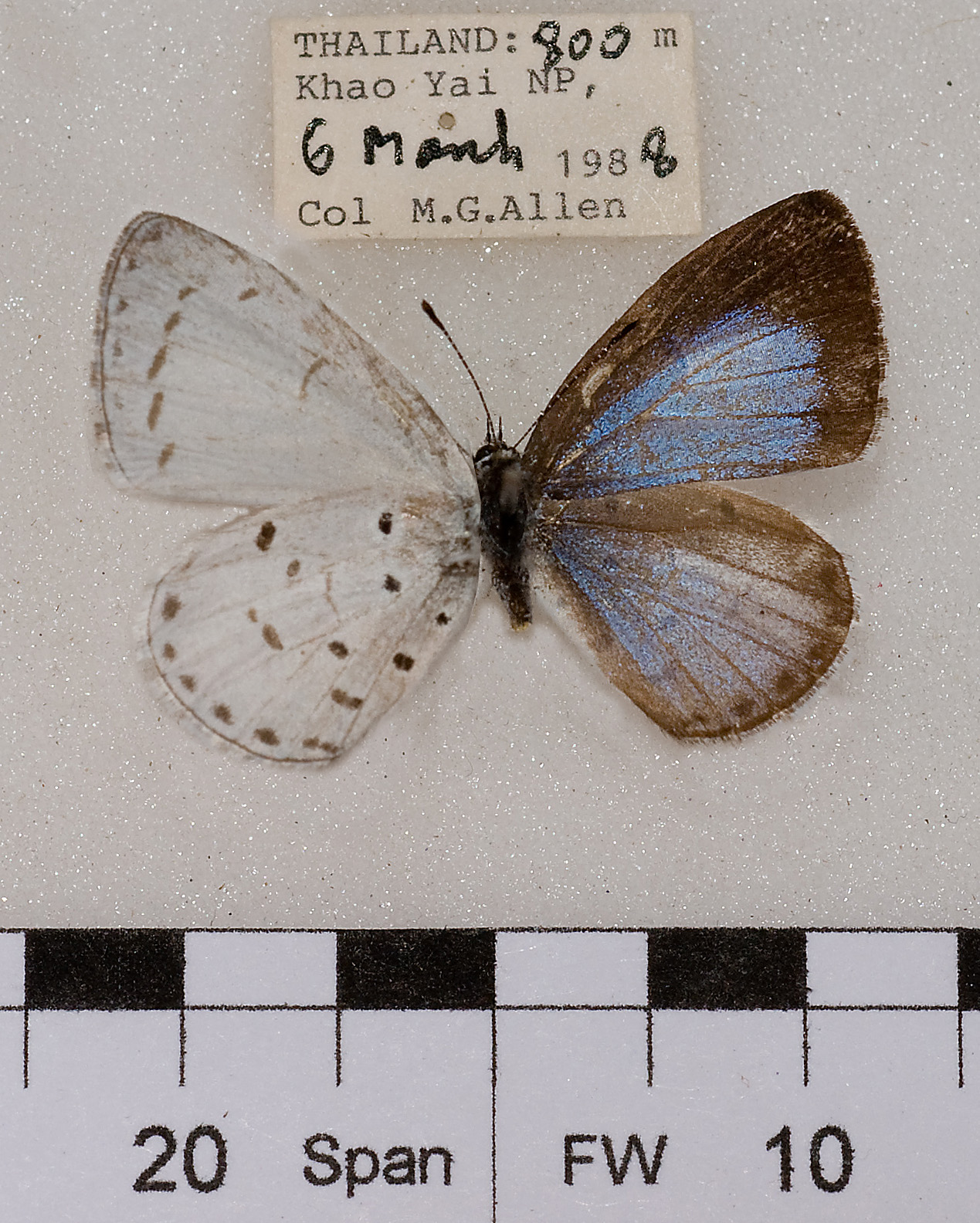
U. s. cerima

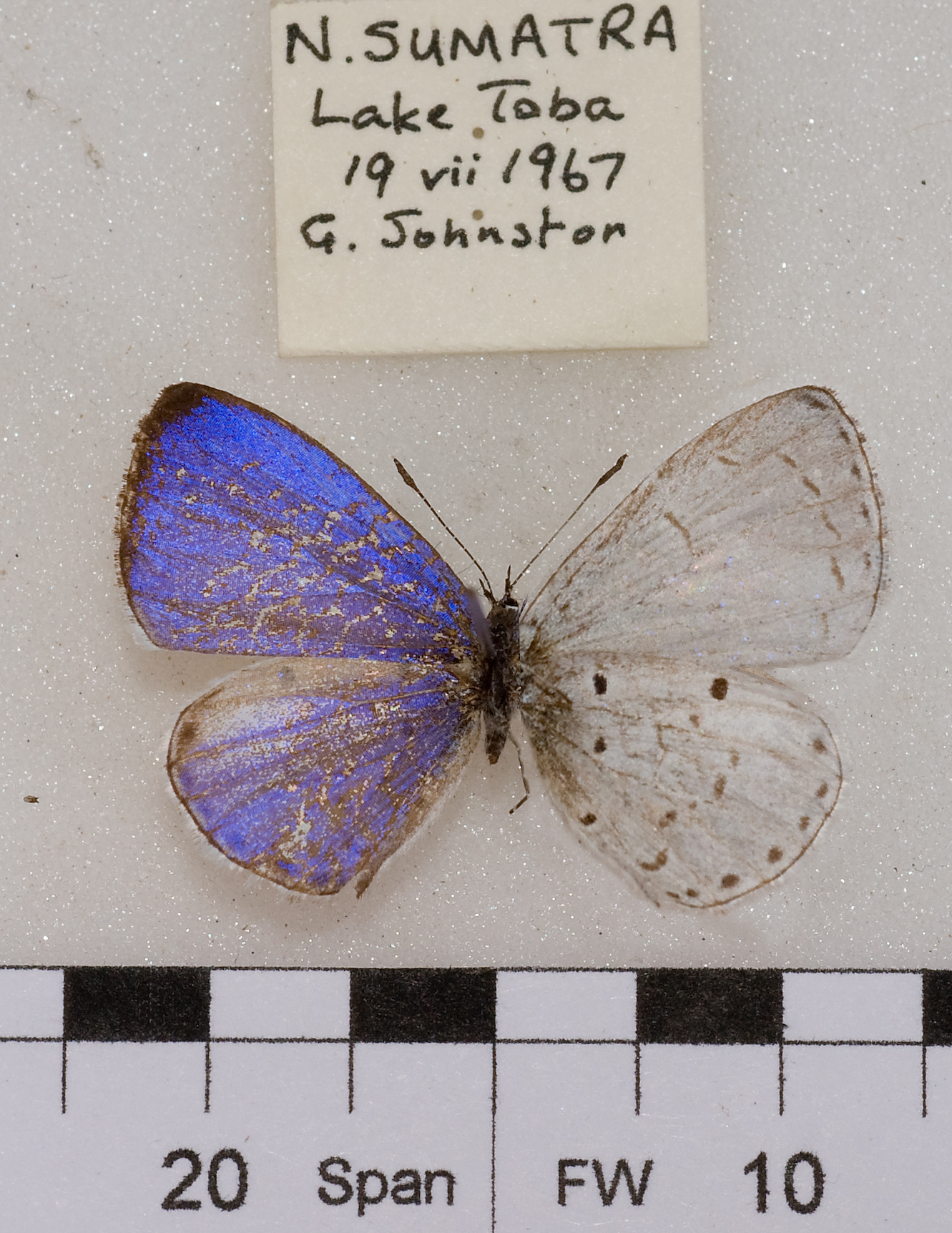
U. s. elothales

== Subspecies ==
- U. s. selma (Borneo)
- U. s. cerima (Corbet, 1937) (Assam, Burma, Thailand)
- U. s. elothales (Fruhstorfer, 1910) (Sumatra)
- U. s. mindanensis Eliot and Kawazoé, 1983 (Philippines: Mindanao)
- U. s. tanarata (Corbet, 1895) (Malaysia)
