= Vága =

Vága can refer to a municipality in:

- Slovakia, see Váhovce (Vága in Hungarian)
- the Faroe Islands, see Vága kommuna
