= Vagan, Glamoč =

Vagan
- Village
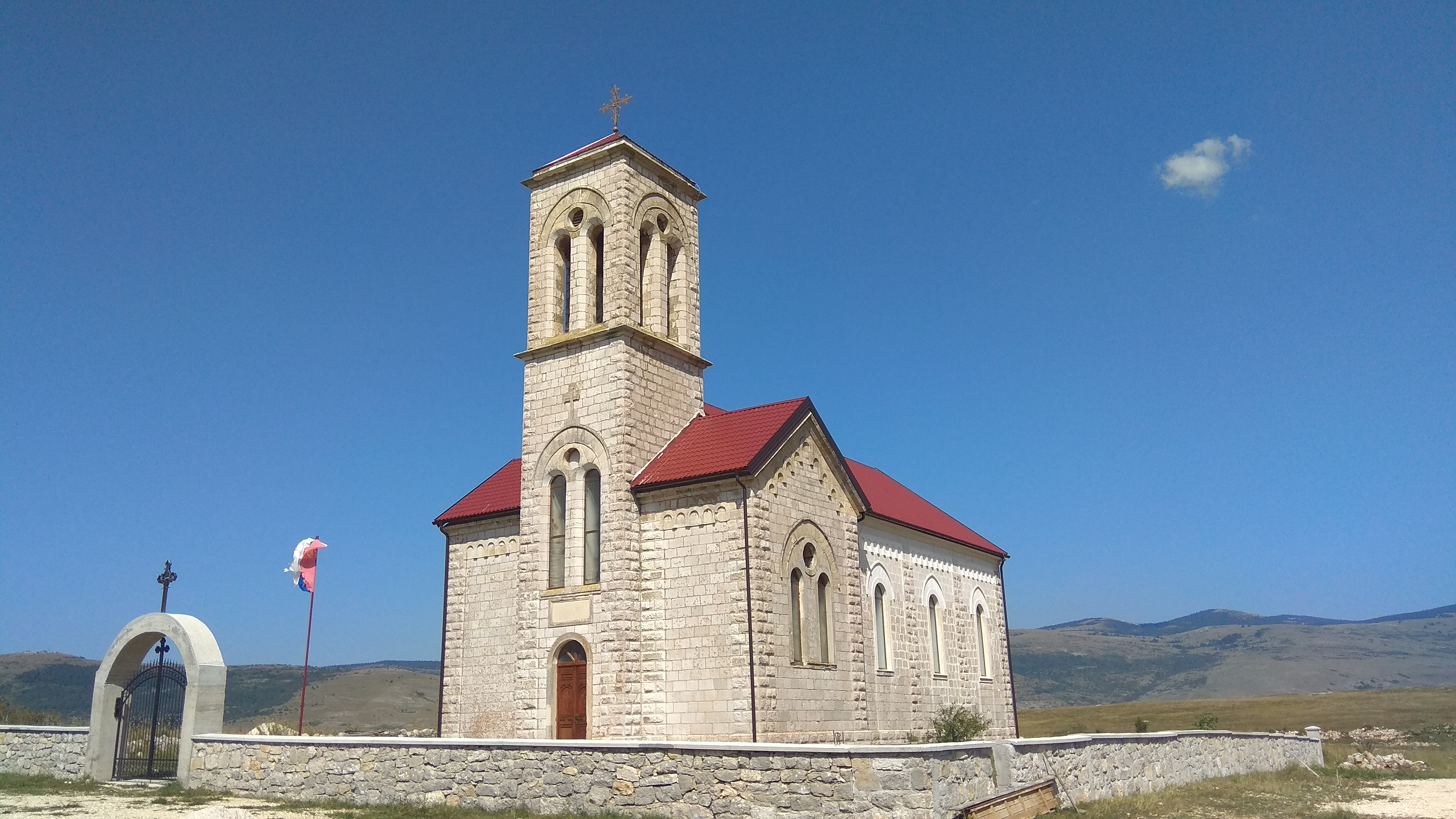
- The village church of the Saint Apostles Peter and Paul

- Location within Bosnia and Herzegovina
- Coordinates: 44°10′04″N 16°45′42″E
- Country: Bosnia and Herzegovina
- Entity: Federation of Bosnia and Herzegovina
- Canton: Canton 10
- Municipality: Glamoč

Area
  - Total: 17.76 km^{2} (6.86 sq mi)

Population (2013)
  - Total: 7
  - Density: 0.39/km^{2} (1.0/sq mi)
- Time zone: UTC+1 (CET)
  - Summer (DST): UTC+2 (CEST)

Vagan is a village in the Municipality of Glamoč in Canton 10 of the Federation of Bosnia and Herzegovina, an entity of Bosnia and Herzegovina.

== Demographics ==
According to the 2013 census, its population was 7, all Serbs.

== Bibliography ==
- Ethnicity/National Affiliation, Religion and Mother Tongue (PDF). Sarajevo: Agency for Statistics of Bosnia and Herzegovina. 2019.
