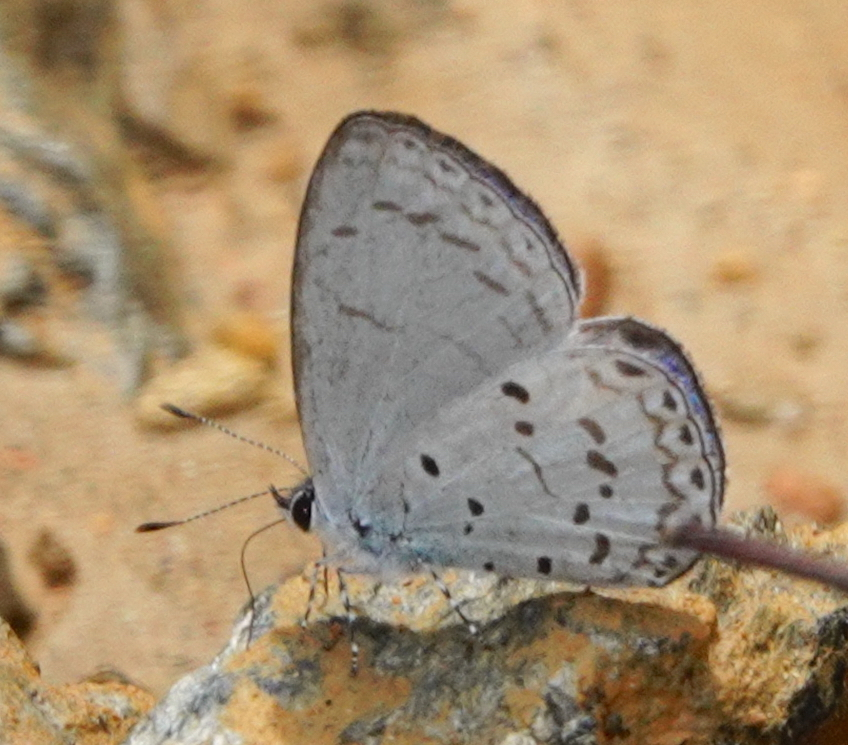
- Udara cardia

Scientific classification
- Domain: Eukaryota
- Kingdom: Animalia
- Phylum: Arthropoda
- Class: Insecta
- Order: Lepidoptera
- Family: Lycaenidae
- Subfamily: Polyommatinae
- Tribe: Polyommatini
- Genus: Udara; Toxopeus, 1928

Synonyms
- List: Akasinula Toxopeus, 1928; Penudara Eliot & Kawazoe, 1983; Perivaga Eliot & Kawazoe, 1983; Selmanix Eliot & Kawazoe, 1983; Vaga Zimmerman, 1958

= Udara =

Butterfly genus in family Lycaenidae

Udara is a genus of butterflies in the family Lycaenidae. The species are found in the Indomalayan and the Australasian realms.

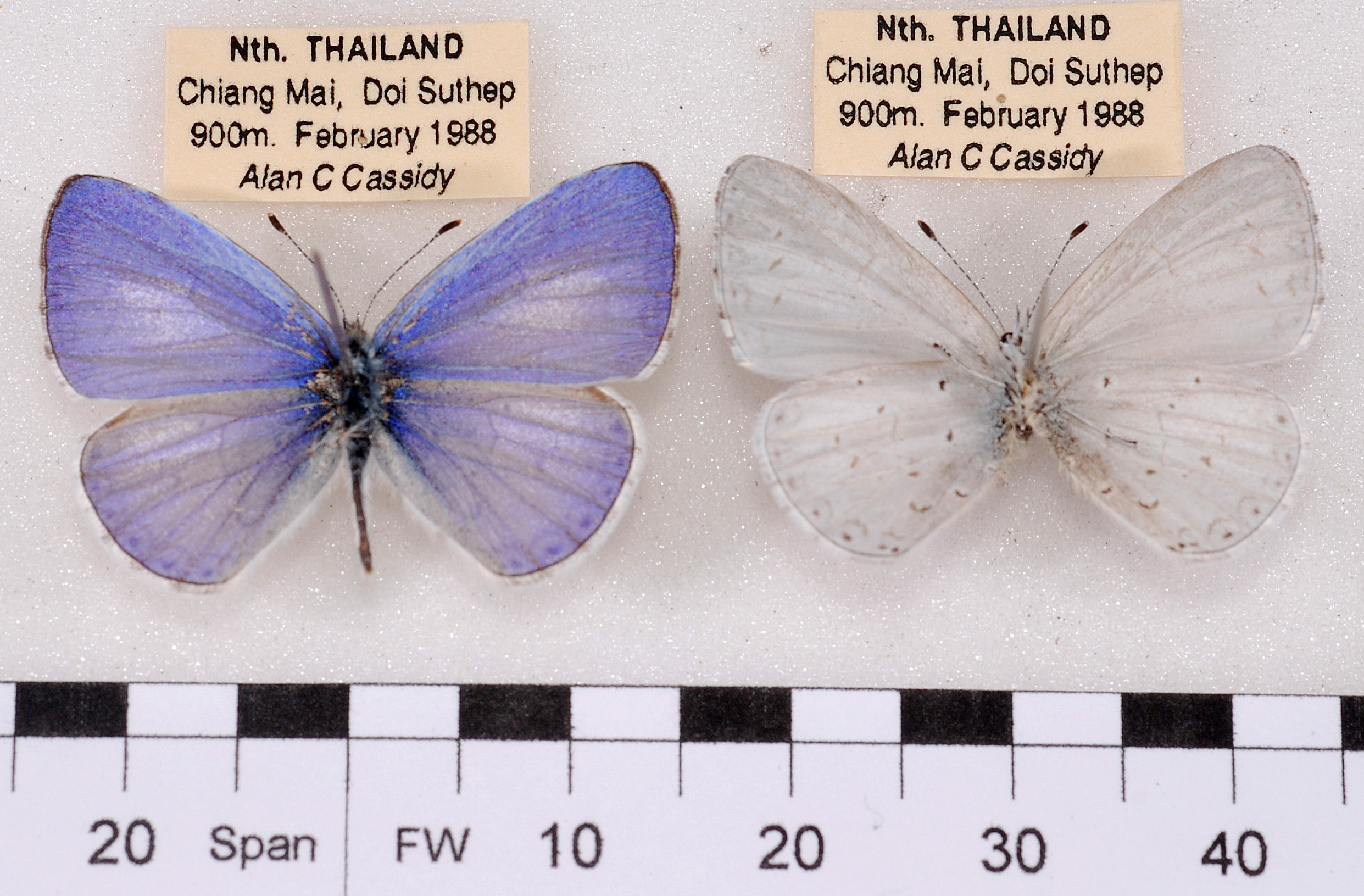
Male Udara dilecta from Thailand, type species of the genus

== Species ==
- Subgenus Udara Toxopeus, 1922
  - Udara akasa (Horsfield, 1828) - white hedge blue (India)
  - Udara aristinus (Fruhstorfer, 1917)
  - Udara aristius (Fruhstorfer, 1910)
  - Udara camenae (de Nicéville, [1895])
  - Udara cardia (Felder, 1860)
  - Udara coalita (de Nicéville, 1891)
  - Udara cyma (Toxopeus, 1927)
  - Udara dilectissima (Druce, 1895)
  - Udara dilecta (Moore, 1879) (India, China, Malay Peninsula)
  - Udara drucei (Bethune-Baker, 1906)
  - Udara etsuzoi Eliot & Kawazoé, 1983
  - Udara lanka Moore, 1877 - Ceylon hedge blue (Sri Lanka)
  - Udara masinissa (Fruhstorfer, 1910)
  - Udara placidula (Druce, 1895)
  - Udara rona (Grose-Smith, 1894)
  - Udara serangana Eliot & Kawazoé, 1983
  - Udara singalensis (R. Felder, 1868)
  - Udara tenella (Miskin, 1891)
  - Udara toxopeusi (Corbet, 1937)
- Subgenus Selmanix Eliot & Kawazoé, 1983
  - Udara aemulus Eliot & Kawazoé, 1983
  - Udara ceyx (de Nicéville, [1893])
  - Udara nishiyamai Eliot & Kawazoé, 1983
  - Udara santotomasana Eliot & Kawazoé, 1983
  - Udara selma (Druce, 1895)
  - Udara wilemani Eliot & Kawazoé, 1983
- Subgenus Penudara Eliot & Kawazoé, 1983
  - Udara albocaerulea (Moore, 1879)
  - Udara oviana (Fruhstorfer, 1917)
  - Udara tyotaroi Eliot & Kawazoé, 1983
- Subgenus Perivaga
  - Udara antonia Eliot & Kawazoé, 1983
  - Udara cybele Eliot & Kawazoé, 1983
  - Udara davenporti (Parsons, 1986)
  - Udara laetitia Eliot & Kawazoé, 1983
  - Udara manokwariensis (Joicey, Noakes & Talbot, 1915)
  - Udara meeki (Bethune-Baker, 1906)
  - Udara owgarra (Bethune-Baker, 1906)
  - Udara pullus (Joicey & Talbot, 1916)
  - Udara sibatanii (Eliot & Kawazoé, 1983)
- Subgenus Vaga
  - Udara blackburni (Tuely, 1878) - Hawaiian blue (Hawaii)
