= Vaga (surname) =

Vaga is a surname of multiple origins.

- August Vaga (1893–1960), Estonian botanist
- Kristo Enn Vaga (born 1997), Estonian racing cyclist and politician
- Malo Vaga (born 1965), Samoan football manager and referee
- Perino del Vaga (1501–1547), Italian painter
- Voldemar Vaga (1899–1999), Estonian art and architecture historian and teacher
