= Vazgen Sargsyan House-Museum =

Coordinates: 39°49′20″N 44°42′20″E

- Վազգեն Սարգսյանի տուն-թանգարան
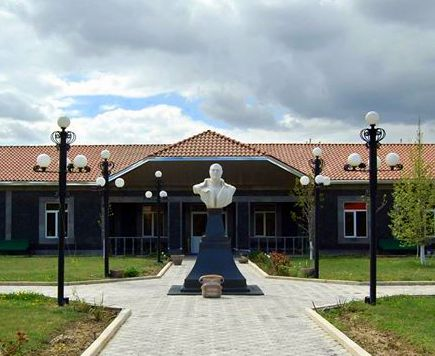
- The main facade of the museum
- Established: 2001
- Location: Ararat, Ararat Province Armenia
- Type: House-museum
- Key holdings: Vazgen Sargsyan's belongings

Vazgen Sargsyan House-Museum (Armenian: Վազգեն Սարգսյանի տուն-թանգարան) is a house-museum located in the Ararat village of Ararat Province, Armenia. It was opened in 2001. The museum is dedicated to the former Prime Minister of Armenia Vazgen Sargsyan.

== Gallery ==
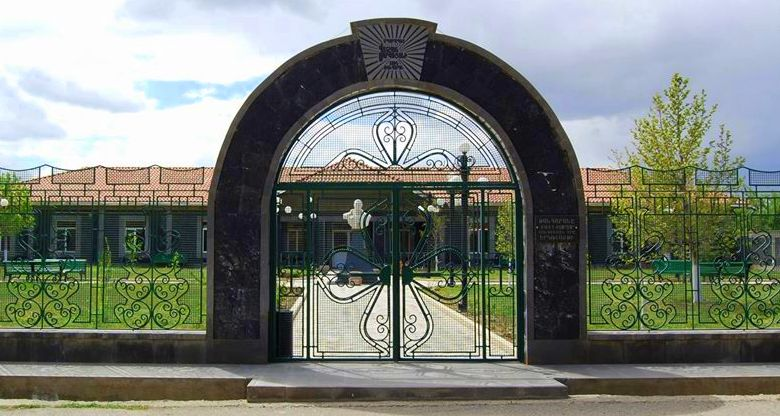

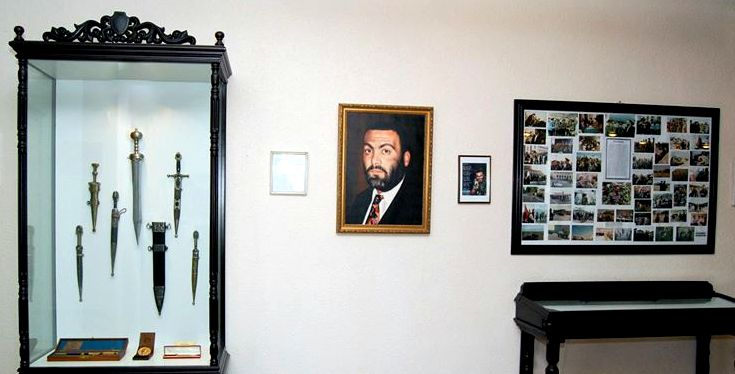

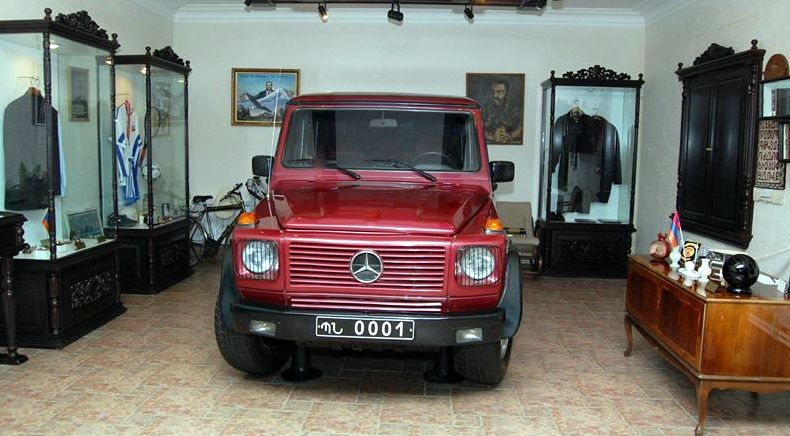

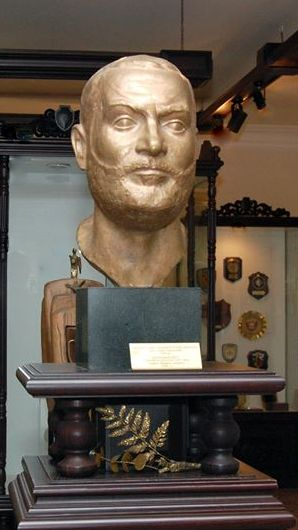

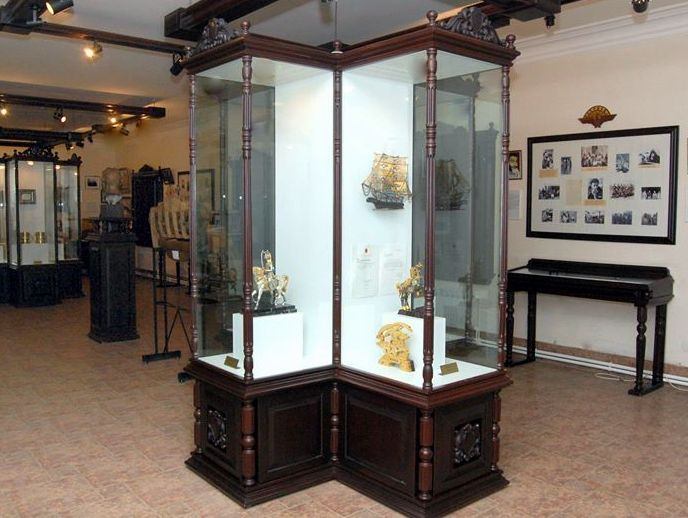
