= Vaga (inhabited locality) =

Vaga (Russian: Вага) is the name of several rural localities in Russia.

Modern rural localities

- Vaga, Arkhangelsk Oblast, a railway station classified as a rural locality under the administrative jurisdiction of the town of district significance of Velsk in Velsky District of Arkhangelsk Oblast
- Vaga, Bryansk Oblast, a settlement in Chelkhovsky Rural Administrative Okrug of Klimovsky District in Bryansk Oblast; 52°14′N 31°56′E
- Vaga, Kirov Oblast, a village in Ozernitsky Rural Okrug of Slobodskoy District in Kirov Oblast

Historical names

- Vaga, former name of Shenkursk, a town in Shenkursky District of Arkhangelsk Oblast
