= Vagen =

Vagen, Vågen or Vägen may refer to:

== People ==
- Arna Vågen (1905–2005), Norwegian missionary and politician
- Morten Vågen (born 1975), Norwegian writer

== Places ==
- Vagen, Germany, a large village in Bavaria
- Vågen, Nordland, Norway, a village
- Vågen, Bergen, Norway, a bay

== Other uses ==
- Battle of Vågen, a 1665 naval battle in the Second Anglo-Dutch War

== See also ==
- Våge (disambiguation)
