= Vågan =

Vågan or Vaagan may refer to:

== People ==
- Eldar Vågan, a songwriter and guitarist in the band Vazelina Bilopphøggers
- Ole Morten Vågan, a Norwegian jazz musician and composer
- Petter Vågan, a bandleader, singer, and guitarist of the Norwegian indie electronica band The Fjords
- Petter Vaagan Moen, a Norwegian former professional footballer

== Places ==
- Vågan Municipality, a municipality in Nordland county, Norway
- Vågan Church, a church in Vågan Municipality in Nordland county, Norway
- Vaagan River, a river in Rajasthan, India

== See also ==
- Similar spelled titled articles, Vagan
