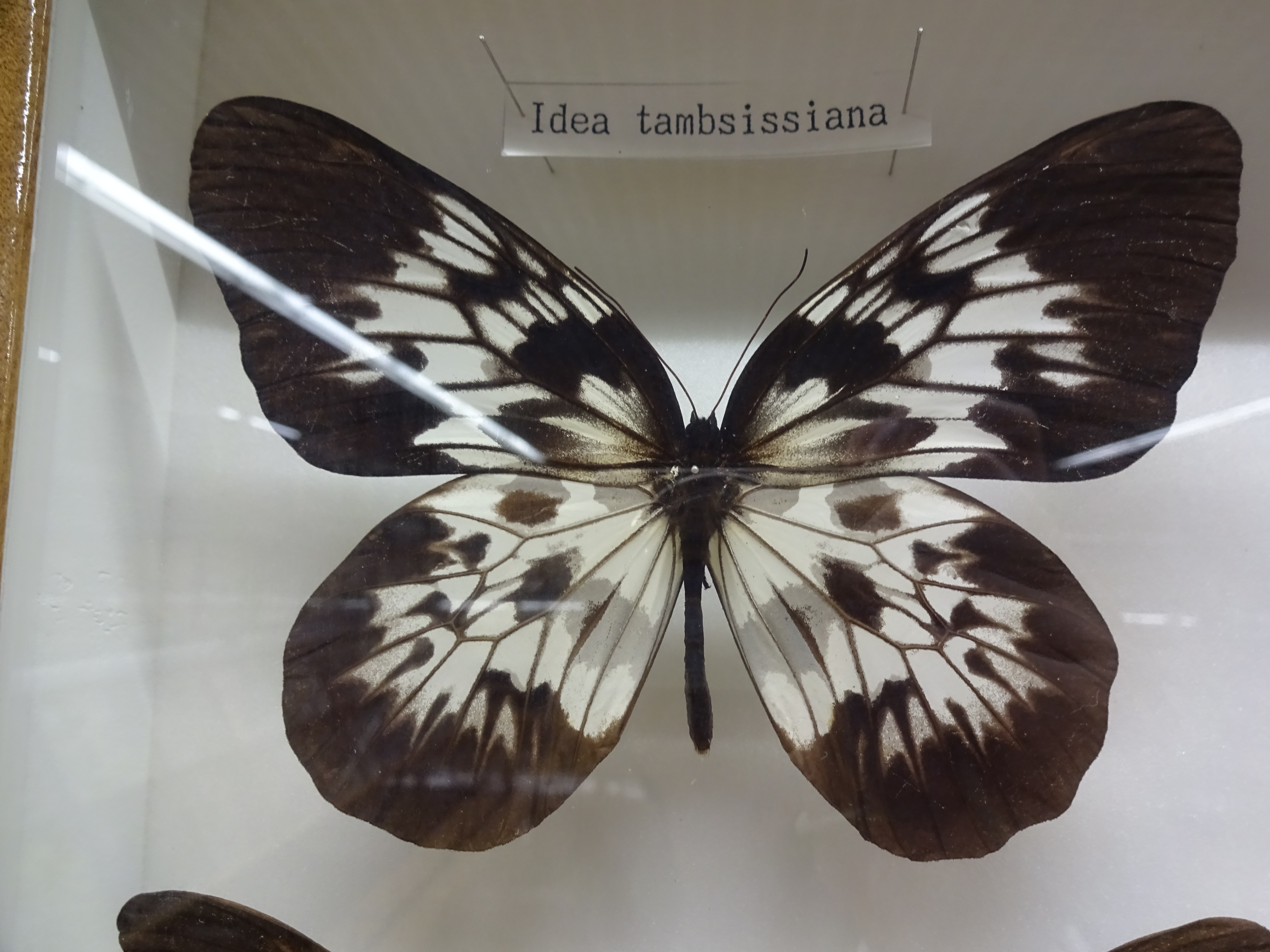

Conservation status
- Vulnerable (IUCN 2.3)

Scientific classification
- Kingdom: Animalia
- Phylum: Arthropoda
- Clade: Pancrustacea
- Class: Insecta
- Order: Lepidoptera
- Family: Nymphalidae
- Genus: Idea
- Species: I. tambusisiana

Binomial name
- Idea tambusisiana Bedford-Russell, 1981

= Bedford-Russell's tree-nymph =

Species of butterfly

The Bedford-Russell's tree-nymph or Sulawesi tree-nymph (Idea tambusisiana) is a species of nymphalid butterfly in the Danainae subfamily. It is endemic to Sulawesi, Indonesia.

The species was originally collected by Major A. Bedford-Russell in 1980. Although there were four separate sightings of this type of butterfly, the unique characteristics that identified it as a new species were centered on a singular female specimen from the region of Sulawesi Tengah (Indonesia) known as central Celebes.

The new specimen is unique in three important details: firstly, the forewing veins, identified as Sc and R1, exhibit a lengthier anastomosis than that generally found on specimens of the genus Idea, the type of butterfly usually sighted in this Indo-Oriental region. Secondly, it has been noted that the head, thorax, abdomen, and legs of the new species are solidly black, in contrast to the dappled coloration of their congeners. Finally, since butterflies maintain the distinctiveness of their group through the intricate reproductive organs, the fact that the genitalia of this female specimen does not conform to the traits characteristic of the species Idea lynceus is important in that it evinces the uniqueness of the specimen. Thus, this new species has been assigned to the group Idea idea.

== History of identification ==
For over 100 years, the only known species from Sulawesi was Idea blanchardii (Marshall 1845). Therefore, Major A. Bedford Russell's discovery of a new Idea species is of noteworthy importance. As seen from the classification table, the butterfly caught by Major A. Bedford Russell is placed in a singular category Idea idea. As Major A. Bedford-Russell recounts in his article entitled, "A Spectacular New Idea from Celebes (Lepidoptera, Danaidae)", it was between March 5 and 10, 1980, that, on four separate occurrences, he and some colleagues first observed both female and male specimens of this unique form of butterfly. While the specimens exhibited the same graceful flight patterns which have earned the genus Idea such names as "forest nymph" or "paper butterfly", upon closer observation, it was evident that the butterflies displayed some divergent physical characteristics which distinguished them from butterflies common in this geographical area, the Idea blanchardii species. On March 10, 1980, Major A. Bedford Russell was able to capture a female specimen and consequently, was able to document the unique traits which characterize these butterflies.

More specifically, the unique features observed lay in four main areas:

- The head, thorax, abdomen, and legs display a solid black colour as opposed to the dappled colouring of the Idea blanchardii species.
- The rib-like tubes supporting butterfly wings, known as "veins", had changed from the Idea blanchardii butterfly – in that the section which opens up one "vein" into another "vein", known as anastomosis, was longer in the "veins" Sc and R1 of the Idea idea butterfly than in the Idea blanchardii butterfly. https://www.researchgate.net/figure/4-General-structure-of-an-adult-butterfly-Papilio-demodocus_fig4_290193055
- The "corpus bursae", the female vessel that accepts sperm from the male, does not possess a ventral ridge characteristic of the lynceus-group. Moreover, the antrum, the posterior section of the "corpus bursae" of this specimen is simple, a trait that characterizes the Idea idea group. Such a specialized and sophisticated reproductive system is of critical importance as it prevents hybridization of the distinctive groups.

== Name ==
The sightings of Idea tambusisiana took place on the south-western face of Mount Tambusisi, in eastern Sulawesi Tengah. The butterflies were sighted at an altitude of 1300 m., usually at a height of 20 to 30 m. above the local ground level, in the treetops. In contrast, the more common Sulawesi native butterfly, Idea blanchardii, was not observed anywhere on Mt. Tambusisi nor was it spotted above 400 m. in altitude and was only seen flying up to 10 m. above ground level.
