= Tree nymph =

Tree nymph is another term for a Dryad in Ancient Greek mythology.

It can also refer to either of two or three genera of the brush-footed butterfly family (Nymphalidae). They occur in different parts of the world and are not particularly closely related:

- Idea (genus), the Asian tree nymphs or paper butterflies, from the milkweed butterfly subfamily (Danainae)
  - Idea lynceus, a butterfly of that genus called the tree-nymph
- Ideopsis, the Southeast Asian tree- and wood nymphs, also known as glassy tigers, from a different lineage of Danainae
- Sevenia, the African tree nymphs, from the tropical brushfoot subfamily (Biblidinae)

== See also ==
- List of tree deities
