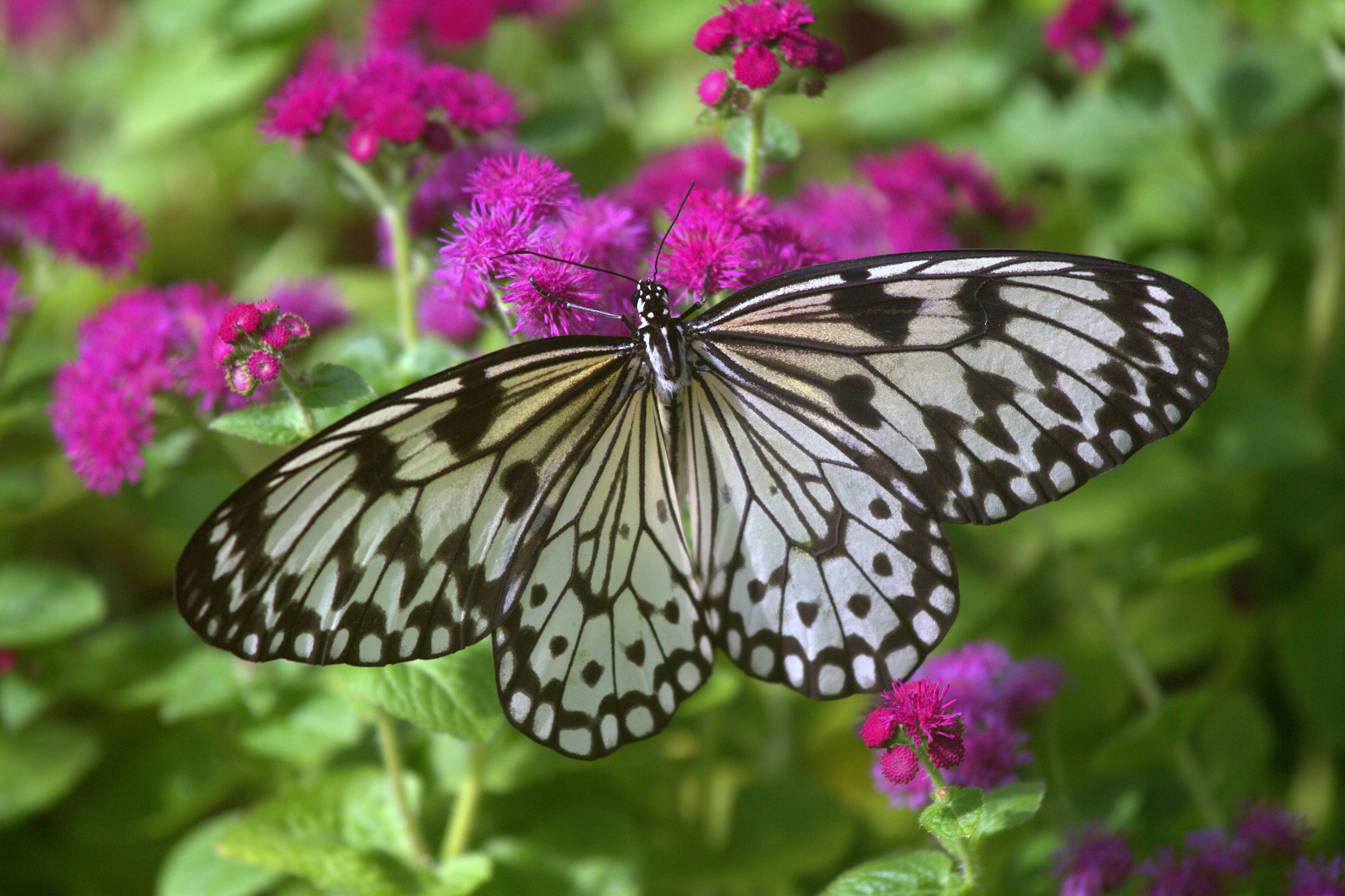
- Dorsal view
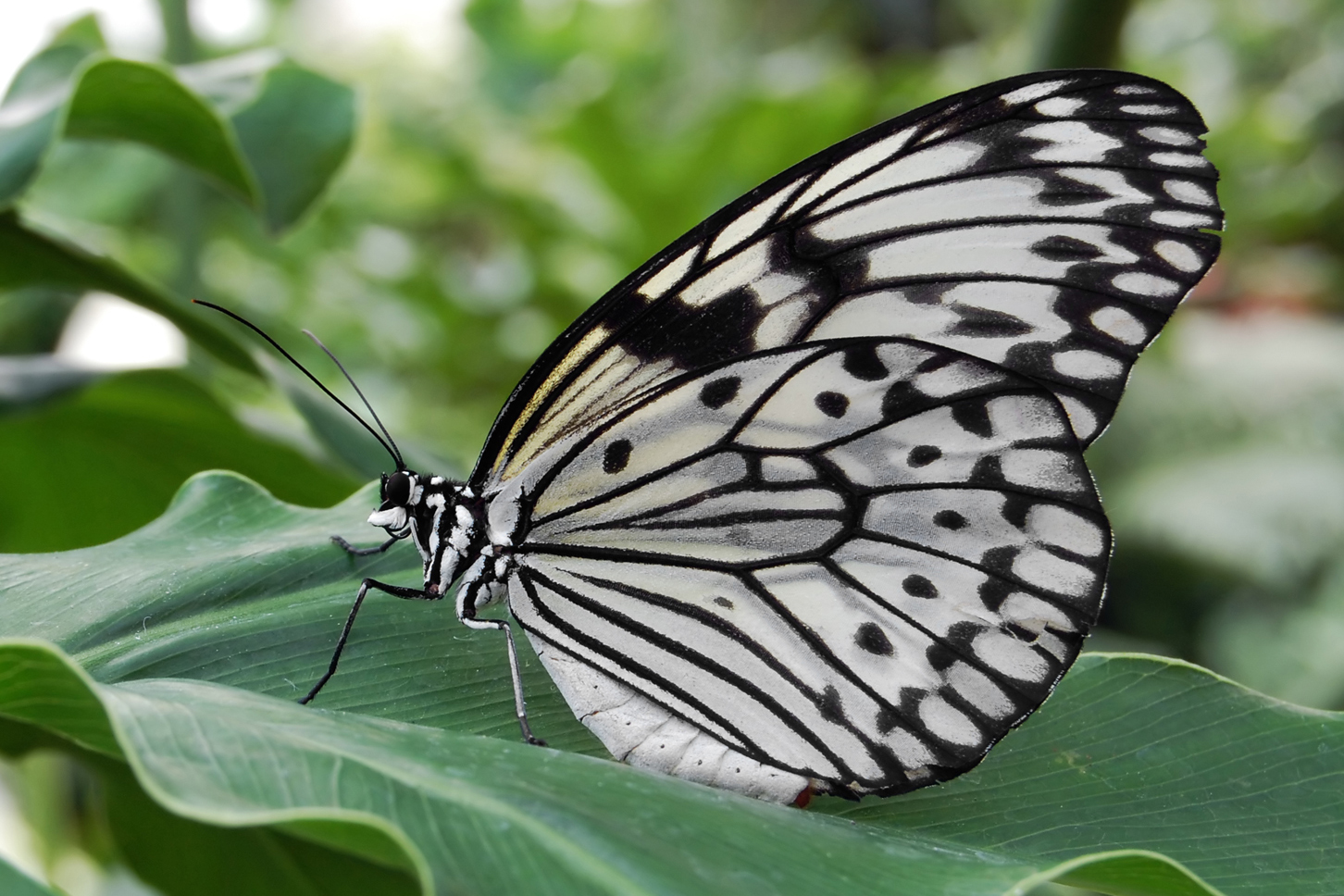
- Ventral view

Scientific classification
- Kingdom: Animalia
- Phylum: Arthropoda
- Clade: Pancrustacea
- Class: Insecta
- Order: Lepidoptera
- Family: Nymphalidae
- Genus: Idea
- Species: I. leuconoe

Binomial name
- Idea leuconoe Erichson, 1834
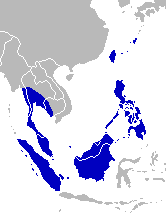

= Idea leuconoe =

Paper kite

Species of butterfly

Idea leuconoe, also known as the paper kite butterfly, rice paper butterfly, large tree nymph, white tree nymph, is a butterfly known especially for its presence in butterfly houses and live butterfly expositions. It has a wingspan of 12 to 14 cm. The paper kite is of Southeast Asian origin, but has also been found in Taiwan and the Ryukyu Islands.

Larvae feed on Parsonsia species, Tylophora hispida, Parsonsia helicandra, Parsonsia spiralis, and Cynanchum formosanum so both the butterfly and larvae are poisonous.

== Description ==
The paper kite butterfly's forewings and hindwings are translucent silvery white with black spots, similar to the Idea lynceus.

== Subspecies ==
Listed alphabetically:

- I. l. athesis Fruhstorfer, 1911
- I. l. caesena Fruhstorfer, 1911
- I. l. chersonesia (Fruhstorfer, 1898)
- I. l. clara (Butler, 1867)
- I. l. engania (Doherty, 1891)
- I. l. esanga Fruhstorfer, 1898
- I. l. fregela Fruhstorfer, 1911
- I. l. godmani Oberthür, 1878
- I. l. gordita Fruhstorfer, 1911
- I. l. javana Fruhstorfer, 1896
- I. l. kwashotoensis (Sonan, 1928)
- I. l. lasiaka van Eecke, 1913
- I. l. leuconoe Erichson, 1834
- I. l. moira Fruhstorfer, 1910
- I. l. natunensis Snellen, 1895
- I. l. nigriana Grose-Smith, 1895
- I. l. obscura Staudinger, 1889
- I. l. princesa Staudinger, 1889
- I. l. samara Fruhstorfer, 1910
- I. l. siamensis (Godfrey, 1916)
- I. l. solyma Fruhstorfer, 1910
- I. l. vedana Fruhstorfer, 1906
- I. l. vicetia Fruhstorfer, 1911

== Gallery ==
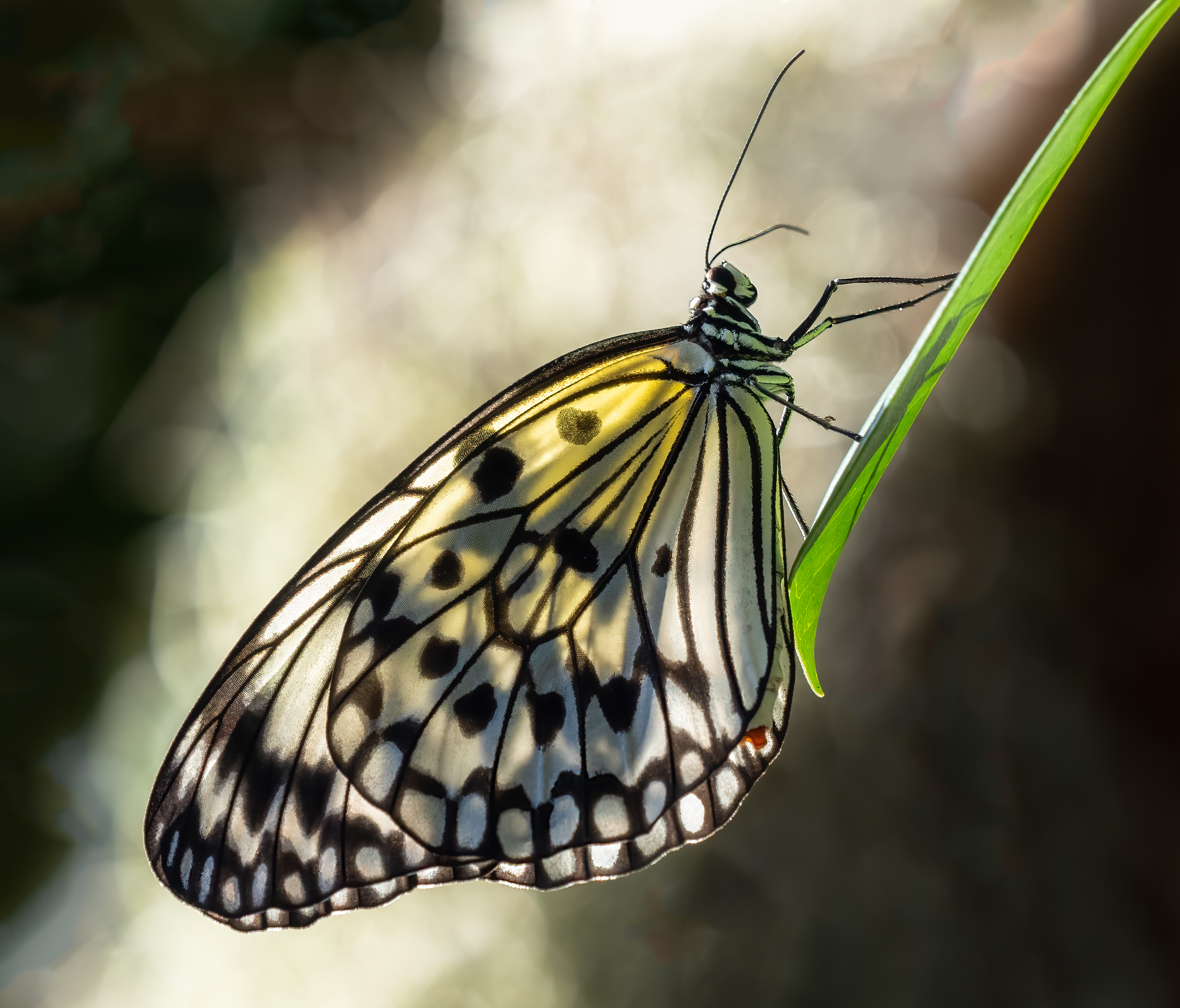
A backlighted side ventral view of the silver wings illustrates why the descriptor “rice paper” is used.

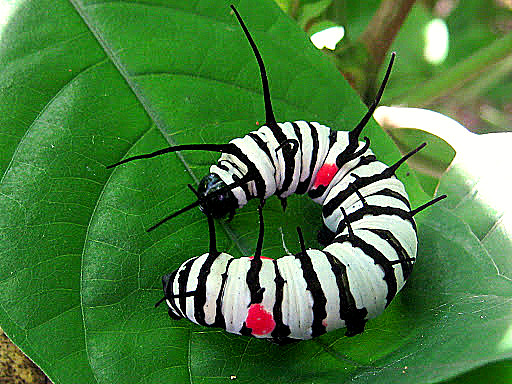
Larva (caterpillar)

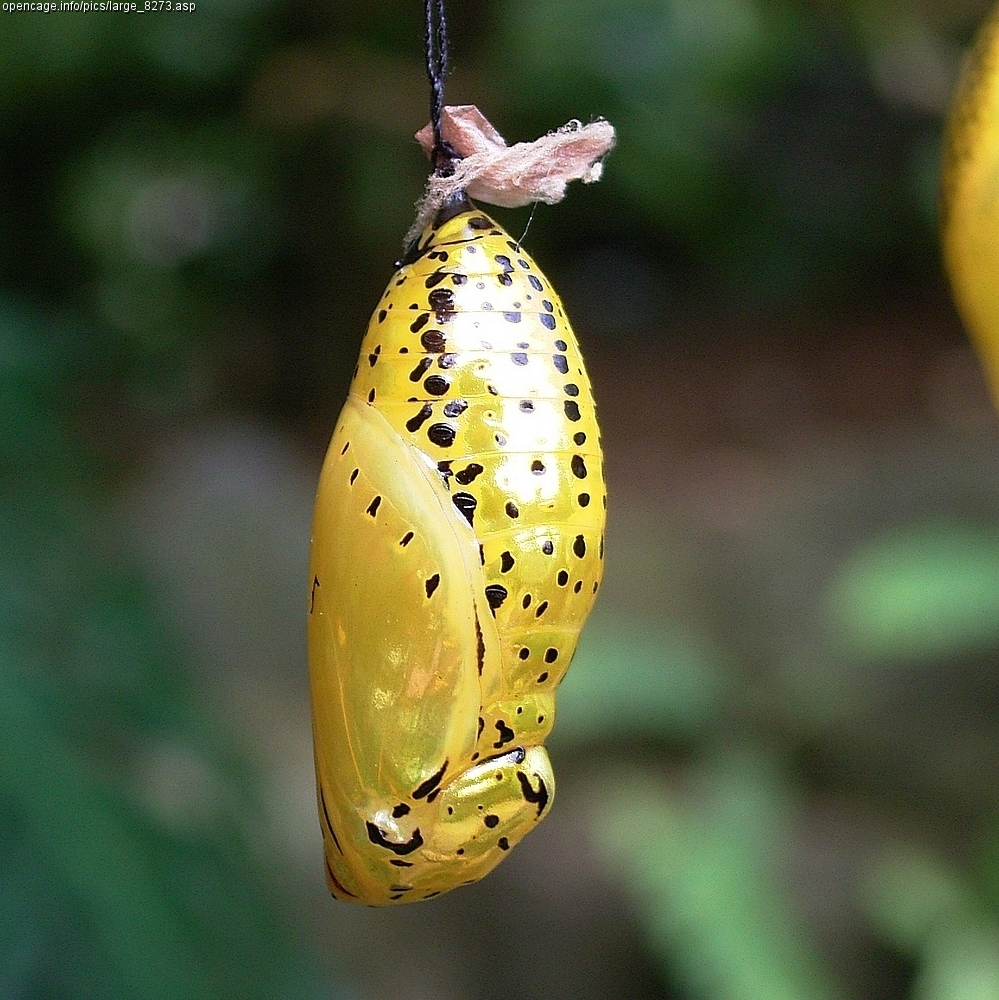
Pupa

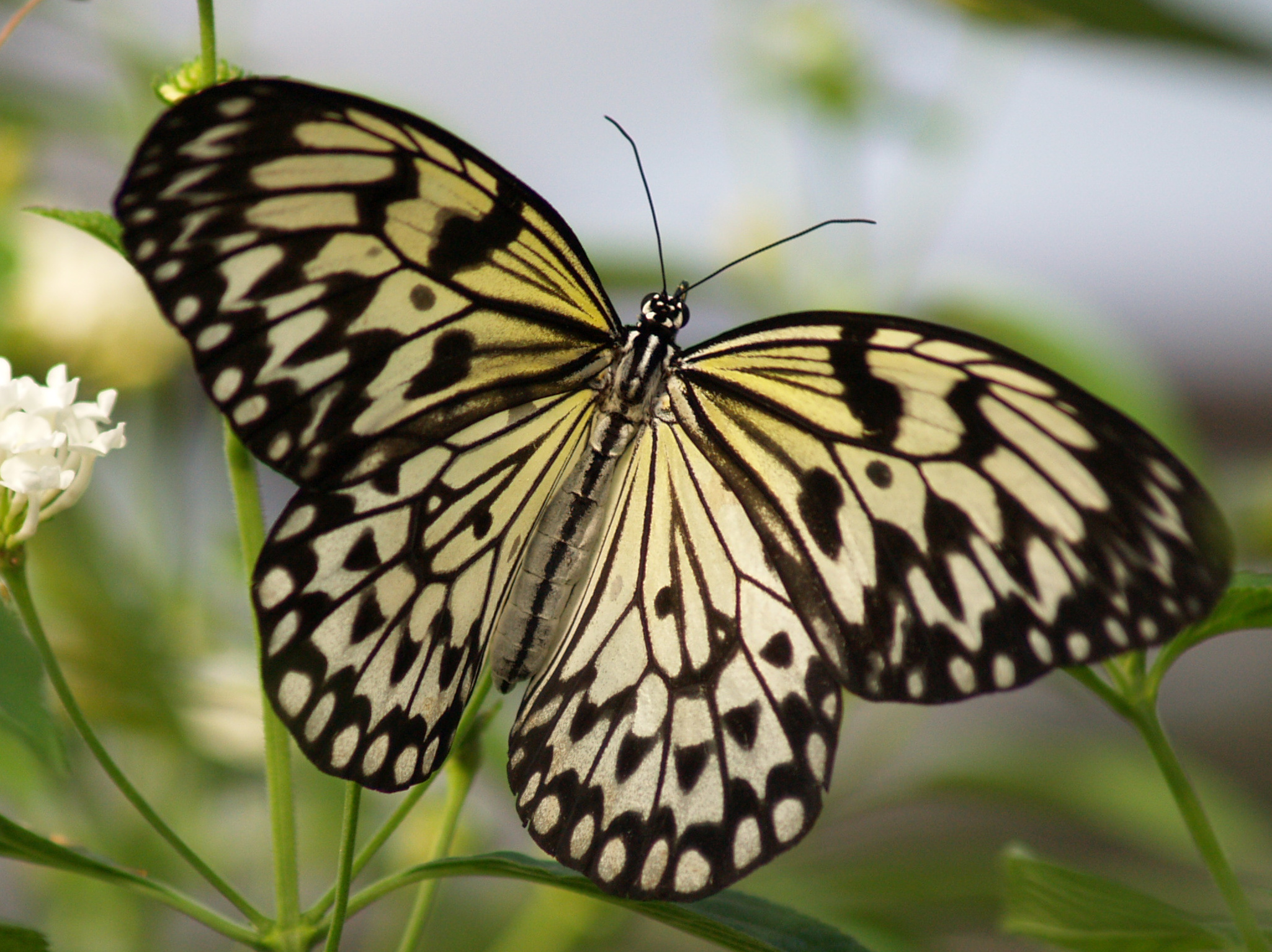
Dorsal view

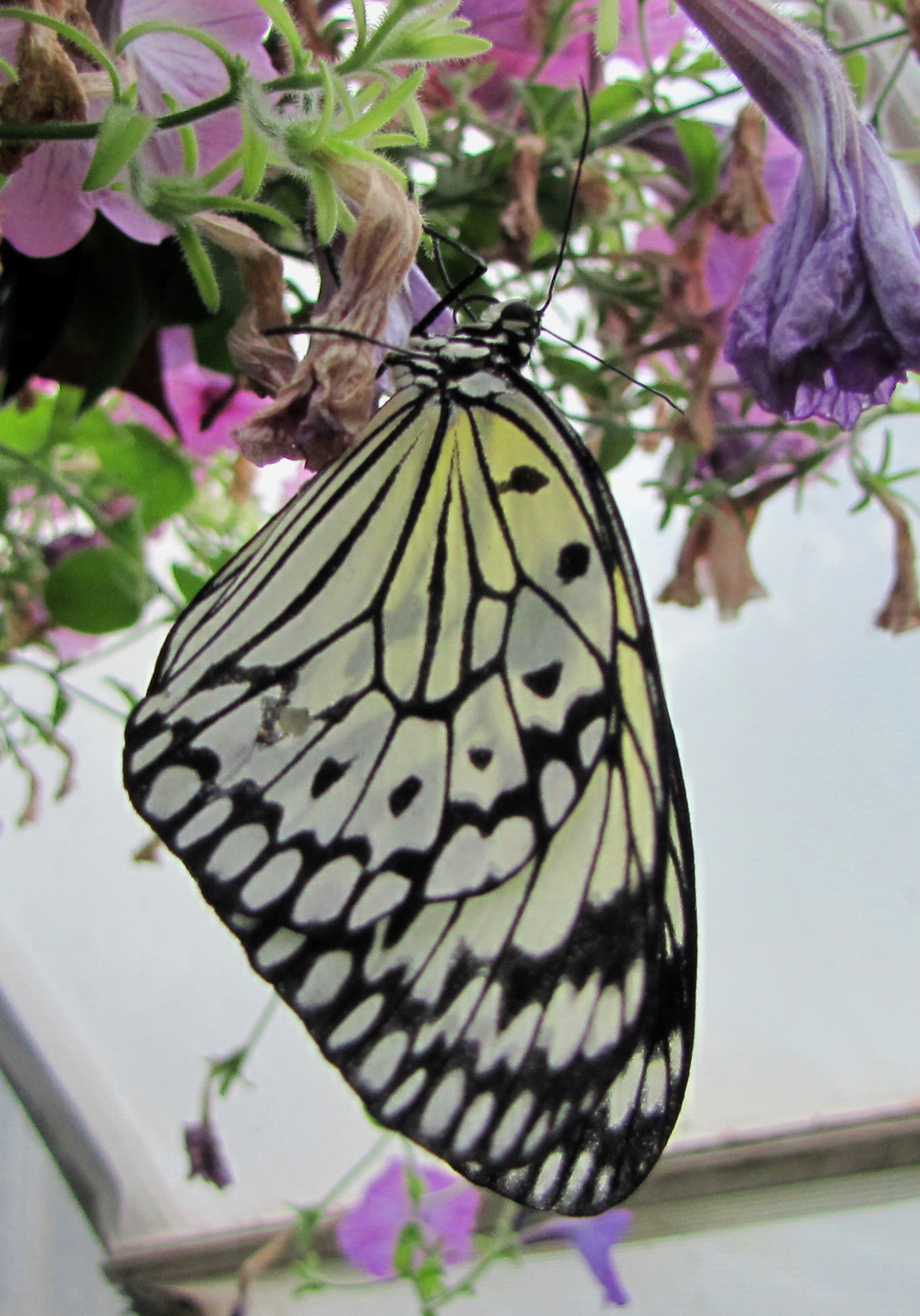
Ventral view

Feeding

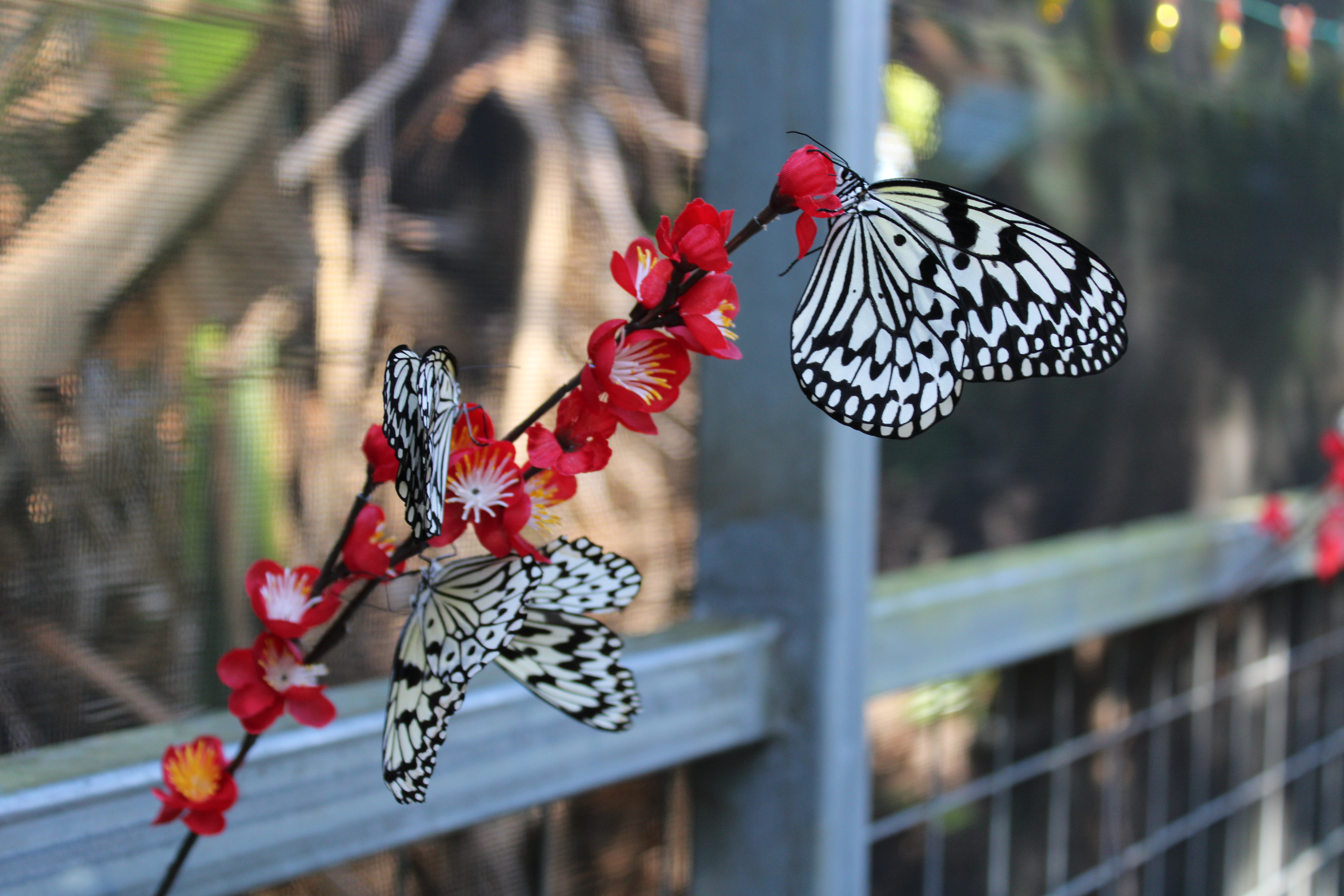
On Japanese quince (Chaenomeles speciosa)
