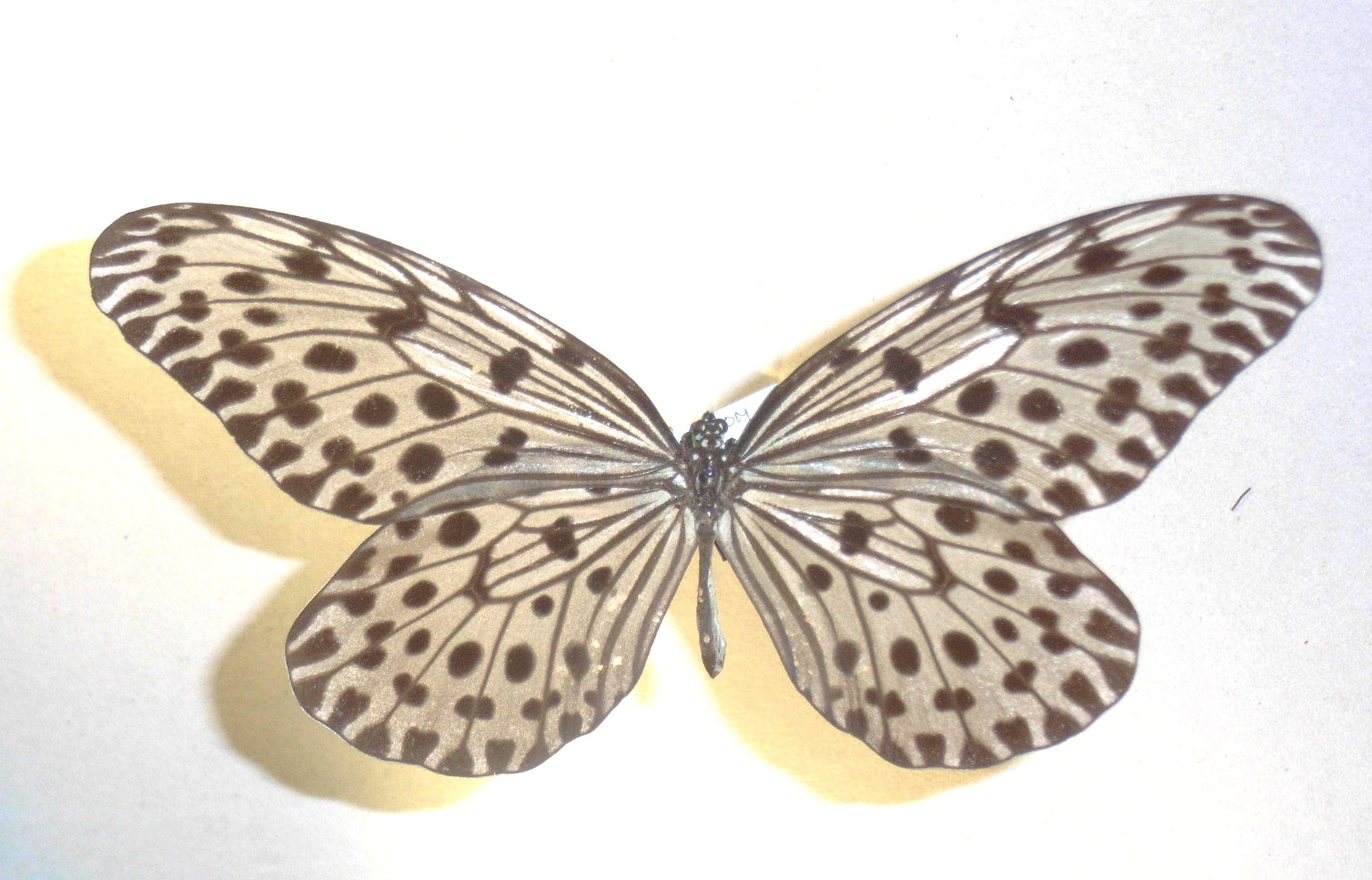
- Specimen collected by Robert Templeton

Conservation status
- Near Threatened (IUCN 2.3)

Scientific classification
- Kingdom: Animalia
- Phylum: Arthropoda
- Clade: Pancrustacea
- Class: Insecta
- Order: Lepidoptera
- Family: Nymphalidae
- Genus: Idea
- Species: I. iasonia

Binomial name
- Idea iasonia (Westwood, 1848)

Synonyms
- Idea jasonia; Hestia iasonia

= Ceylon tree nymph =

Species of butterfly

The Ceylon tree nymph (Idea iasonia) is a species of nymphalid butterfly in the subfamily Danainae. It is endemic to Sri Lanka. First described by John Westwood in 1848, the Ceylon tree nymph can be found in both wet and dry zones of Sri Lanka. It is the largest member of the family Danaidae in that country. It is listed as a near threatened species in the IUCN Red List.

== Taxonomy ==
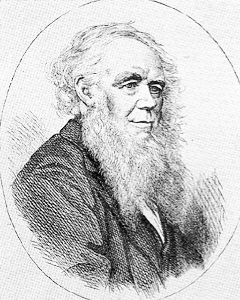
John Westwood was the first to describe Idea iasonia

The species was first described by English entomologist John O. Westwood in 1848, as Hestia iasonia. For several years it was considered to be only an island race of I. lynceus, a species found in eastern Asia. However the two species have differences in their wing shapes and in the male genitalia. It is of the genus Idea, and belongs to the subfamily Danainae of the family Nymphalidae. Its binomial name is Idea iasonia.

== Description ==
The Ceylon tree nymph has a wingspan of 110–155 mm, making it the largest member of the family Danaidae in Sri Lanka. Both its wings have similar patterns and colouration. The wings are of a translucent silvery-white colour. The forewings are almost twice as long as their width. The female is larger than the male, and the males have narrower forewings than the females. The surface area of the Ceylon tree nymph's wings is relatively large when compared with its weight; this allows it to fly with little effort and stay aloft for long periods of time. Ceylon tree nymphs from the dry zone of the country are usually larger in size and lighter in colour than ones from the wet zone.

== Distribution and habitat ==
The species is endemic to Sri Lanka. There are two populations of the Ceylon tree nymph. The smaller and darker variety is found in the wet zone of Sri Lanka from sea level to about 5,000 feet (1,500 m). They usually inhabit the sub-canopies of lowland tropical rain forests.

The other variety, which is larger and lighter coloured, is found in the low country dry zone. They are usually encountered near water courses.

== Behaviour ==
Since the Ceylon tree nymph requires very little effort to fly, its wing beats are very slow, so slow that the individual movements of each wing can be easily observed. Most of its time is spent flying and hovering in the high tree canopies. However, it descends to ground level to feed and to breed, but does not rest on the ground. It usually rests on the ends of dead branches or twigs.

Mating occurs at ground level and the male and female fly together for an hour or more before mating. The male releases pheromones and other chemicals from its hair-pencils to stimulate the female. These include danaidone, a poisonous substance that helps to protect it from predators, which is later passed on to the eggs.

The early stages of life of the Ceylon tree nymph are not well recorded. One account by naturalists Lionel de Nicéville and N. Manders dating from about 1900 describes the larva as "velvety black with four pairs of long filamentous tentacles" with each segment of its body marked with a pale yellow band. The record further mentions that it has twelve segments and that the sixth segment has a "large oval crimson spot". Its head and legs are black.

== Threat ==
In the IUCN Red List, the Ceylon tree nymph is listed as lower risk/near threatened. The main threat faced by the Ceylon tree nymph is the destruction of its habitat. However, various direct steps have been taken for the conservation of this species. Several of its naturally occurring areas are protected areas, such as the Sinharaja Forest Reserve.
