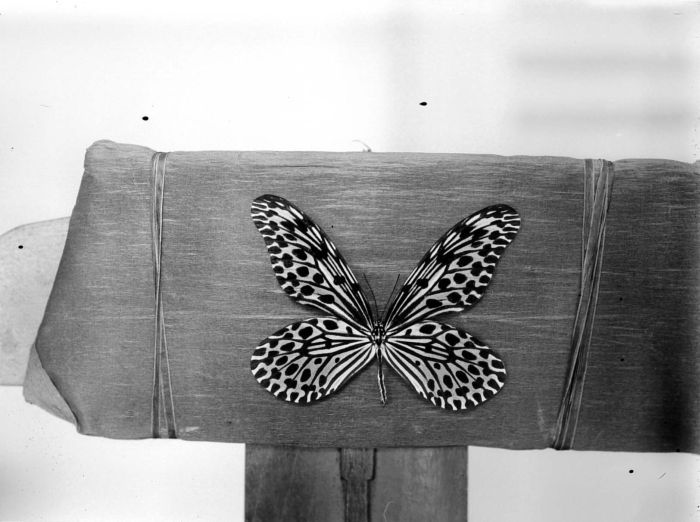
- I. s. logani

Scientific classification
- Kingdom: Animalia
- Phylum: Arthropoda
- Clade: Pancrustacea
- Class: Insecta
- Order: Lepidoptera
- Family: Nymphalidae
- Genus: Idea
- Species: I. stolli

Binomial name
- Idea stolli (Moore, 1883)

Synonyms
- Hestia stolli Moore, 1883; Hestia logani alceste Fruhstorfer, 1910; Hestia diana Fruhstorfer, 1906; Hestia donovani Moore, 1883; Hestia druryi Moore, 1883; Hestia lynceus favorinus Fruhstorfer, 1910; Hestia logani mevaria Fruhstorfer, 1910; [?] *Idea stolli daldorffi Corbet, 1942

= Idea stolli =

Common tree nymph

Species of butterfly

Idea stolli, the common tree nymph, is a species of nymphalid butterfly in the Danainae subfamily. It is found in South East Asia. There are twelve Idea species, of which five occur in West Malaysia.

The wings are white with black dots and veins. The wingspan is about 150 mm.

The larvae feed on Aganosma cymosa and Aganosma corymbosa.

== Subspecies ==
Listed alphabetically:

- I. s. alcine Fruhstorfer, 1910 (southern Borneo, Sarawak)
- I. s. bintanga van Eecke, 1915 (Riau, Lingga Island)
- I. s. hypata Fruhstorfer, 1910 (Sulu Island)
- I. s. logani (Moore, 1883) (Peninsular Malaya, Singapore, Sumatra, Batu Island)
- I. s. stolli (Moore, 1883) (Java)
- I. s. thalassica Fruhstorfer, 1910 (Natuna Island)
- I. s. virgo Fruhstorfer, 1903 (northern Borneo)
