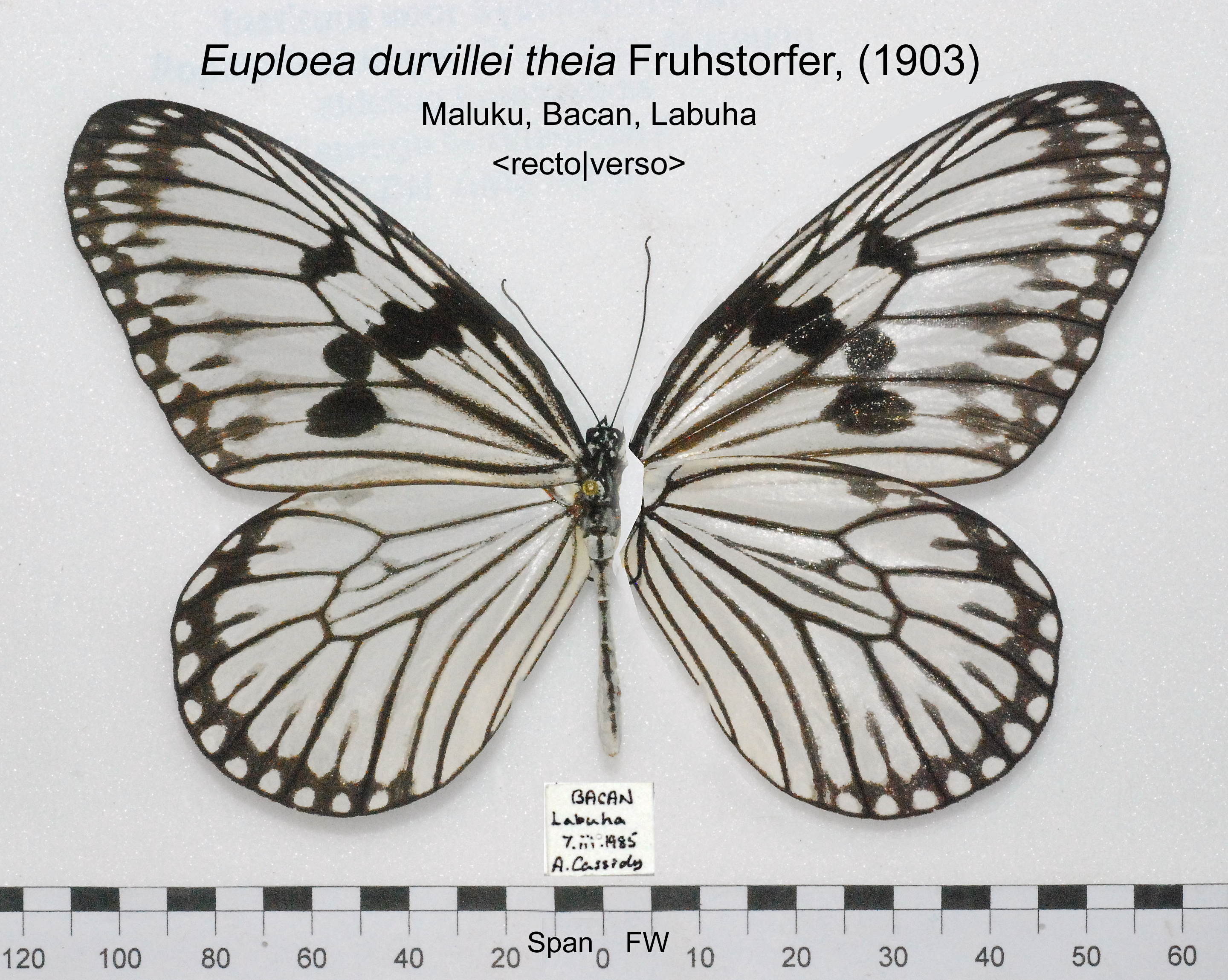
- Idea durvillei theia

Scientific classification
- Domain: Eukaryota
- Kingdom: Animalia
- Phylum: Arthropoda
- Class: Insecta
- Order: Lepidoptera
- Family: Nymphalidae
- Genus: Idea
- Species: I. durvillei

Binomial name
- Idea durvillei Boisduval, 1832

Synonyms
- Nectaria idea vosseleri Fruhstorfer, 1903; Nectaria idea aruna Fruhstorfer, 1904; obiana Fruhstorfer, 1910; Hestia d'urvillei sangira van Eecke, 1915; Hestia idea f. strigata van Eecke, 1915; Nectaria idea theia Fruhstorfer, 1903; Nectaria idea hemera Fruhstorfer, 1903; Hestia idea keyensis Fruhstorfer, 1899; Nectaria idea nike Fruhstorfer, 1903; Hestia idea metris Fruhstorfer, 1903

= Idea durvillei =

Species of butterfly

Idea durvillei is a large butterfly that belongs to the danaid group of the family Nymphalidae. It was described by Jean Baptiste Boisduval in 1832. It is found in the Australasian realm. The name honours Jules Dumont d'Urville.

== Subspecies ==
- I. d. durvillei (Misool, Gebe, Waigeu)
- I. d. theia (Fruhstorfer, 1903) (Halmahera, Ternate, Bachan, Obi)
- I. d. hemera (Fruhstorfer, 1903) (Biak)
- I. d. keyensis (Fruhstorfer, 1899) (Kai Island, Aru)
- I. d. nike (Fruhstorfer, 1903) (West Irian, Mioswar, Jobi Island)
- I. d. metris (Fruhstorfer, 1903) (Salawati)
