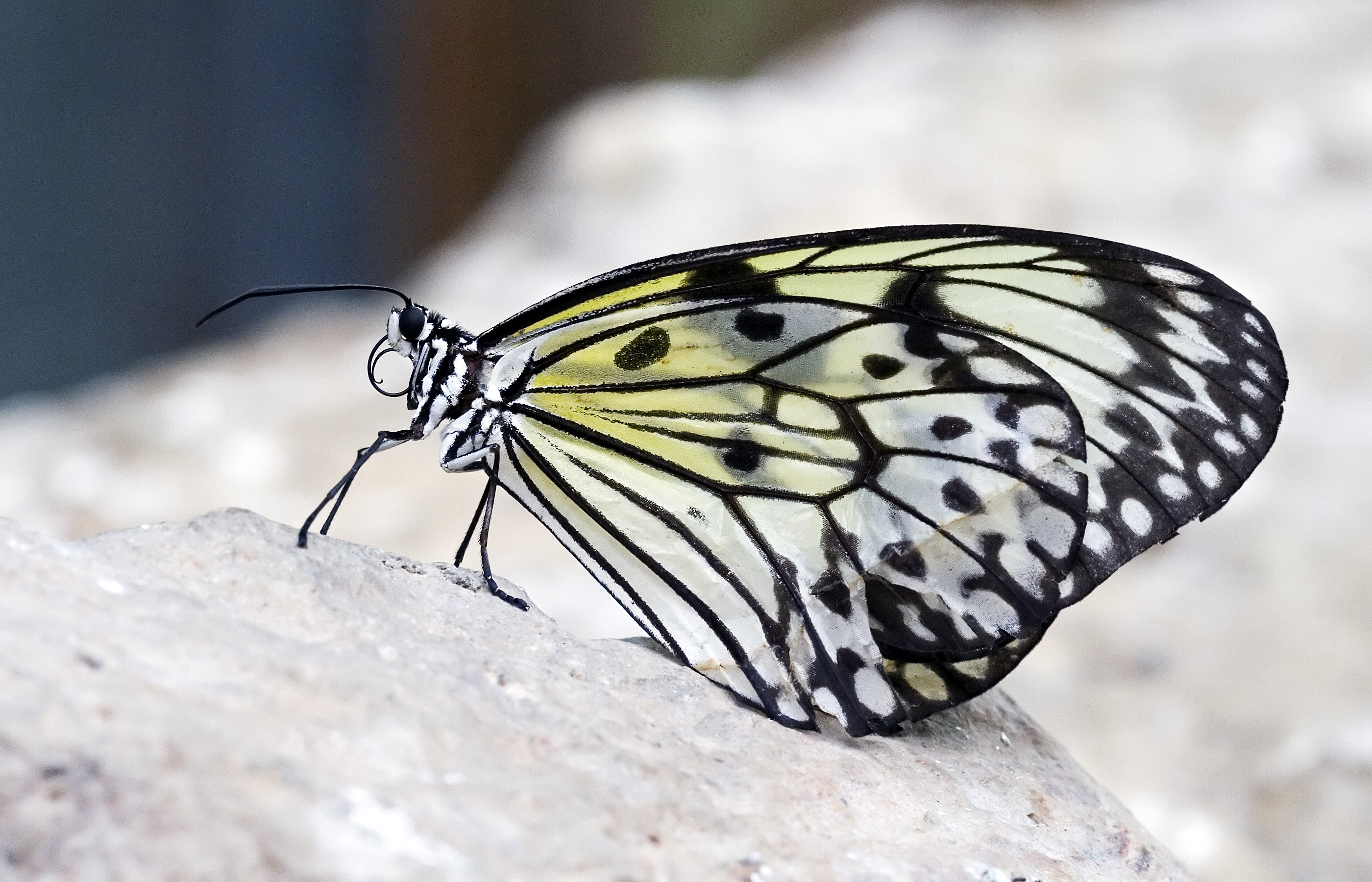

Conservation status
- Vulnerable (IUCN 2.3)

Scientific classification
- Kingdom: Animalia
- Phylum: Arthropoda
- Clade: Pancrustacea
- Class: Insecta
- Order: Lepidoptera
- Family: Nymphalidae
- Genus: Idea
- Species: I. electra

Binomial name
- Idea electra (Semper, 1878)

Subspecies
- I. e. electra Philippines (E.Mindanao, Taganito, Tota); I. e. harmonia Fruhstorfer, 1910

Synonyms
- Hestia electra

= Electra's tree-nymph =

Species of butterfly

The Electra's tree-nymph (Idea electra) is a species of nymphalid butterfly in the Danainae subfamily. It is endemic to the Philippines.
