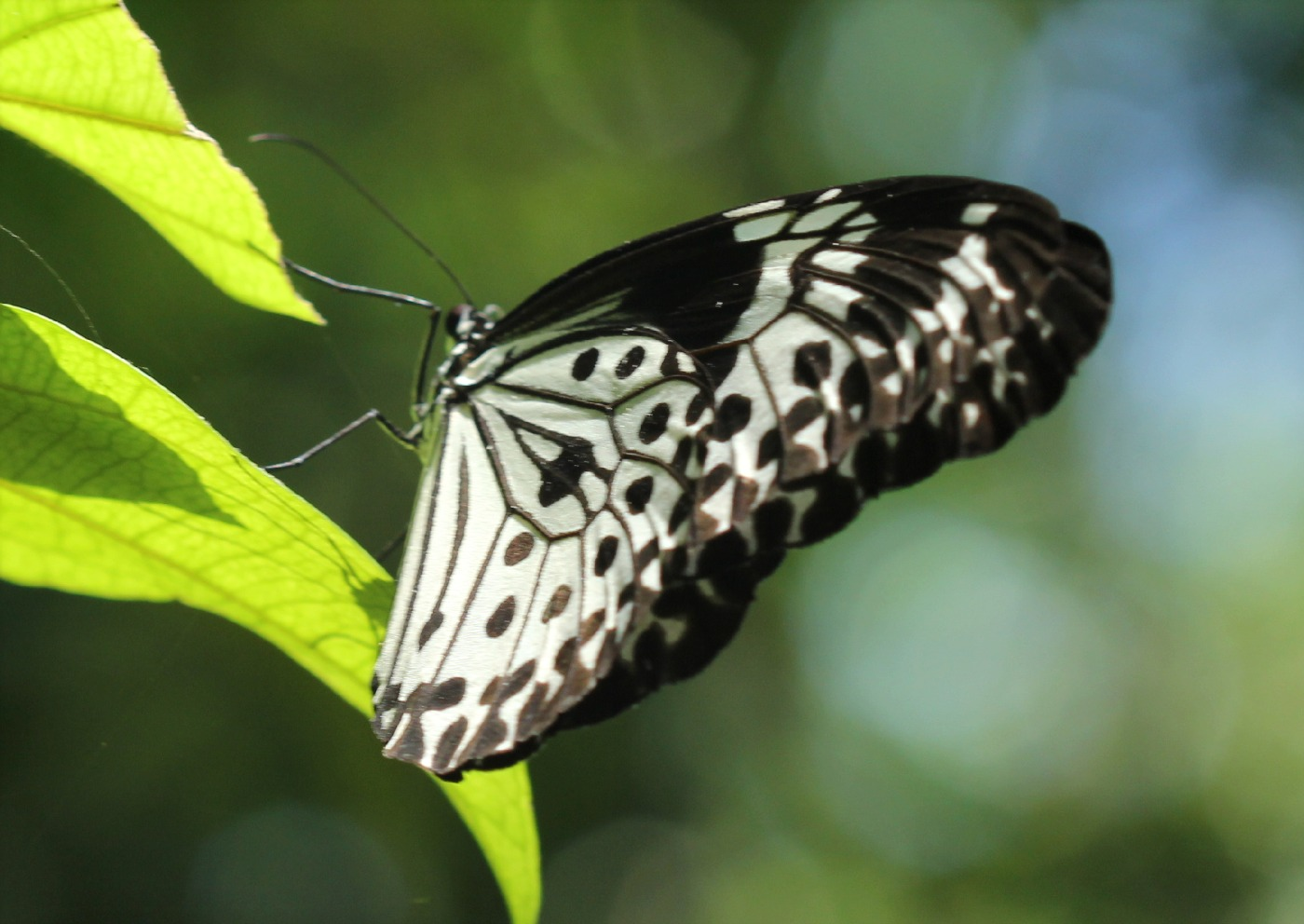

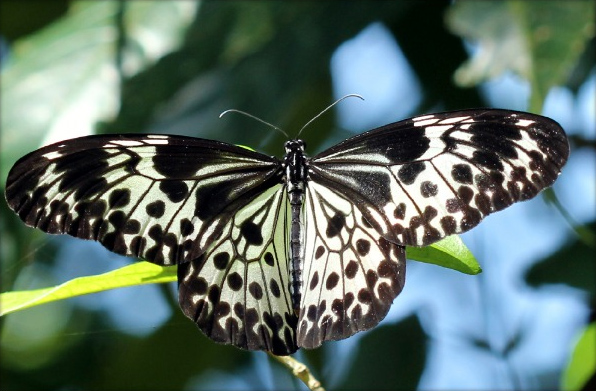

Scientific classification
- Domain: Eukaryota
- Kingdom: Animalia
- Phylum: Arthropoda
- Class: Insecta
- Order: Lepidoptera
- Family: Nymphalidae
- Genus: Idea
- Species: I. agamarschana

Binomial name
- Idea agamarschana (C. & R. Felder, 1865)

Synonyms
- Hestia agamarschana C. & R. Felder, [1865]; Hestia jasonia margherita Fruhstorfer, 1903; Hestina hadeni Wood-Mason & de Nicéville, 1880

= Idea agamarschana =

Andaman tree-nymph

Species of butterfly

Idea agamarschana, the Andaman tree-nymph or Burma tree nymph, is a large butterfly that belongs to the danaid group of the family Nymphalidae. It is found in Burma, Bangladesh, India and on the Andaman Islands. The habitat consists of forest clearings and it is also found above the forest canopy.

== Subspecies ==
- Idea agamarschana agamarschana (southern Burma to Assam)
- Idea agamarschana hadeni (Wood-Mason & de Nicéville, 1880) (southern Burma to Bengal)
- Idea agamarschana arrakana Fruhstorfer, 1910 (Upper Burma to Bangladesh) – Burma tree nymph
- Idea agamarschana cadelli Wood-Mason & de Nicéville, 1880 (Andamans) - Andaman tree-nymph or Andaman tree nymph
