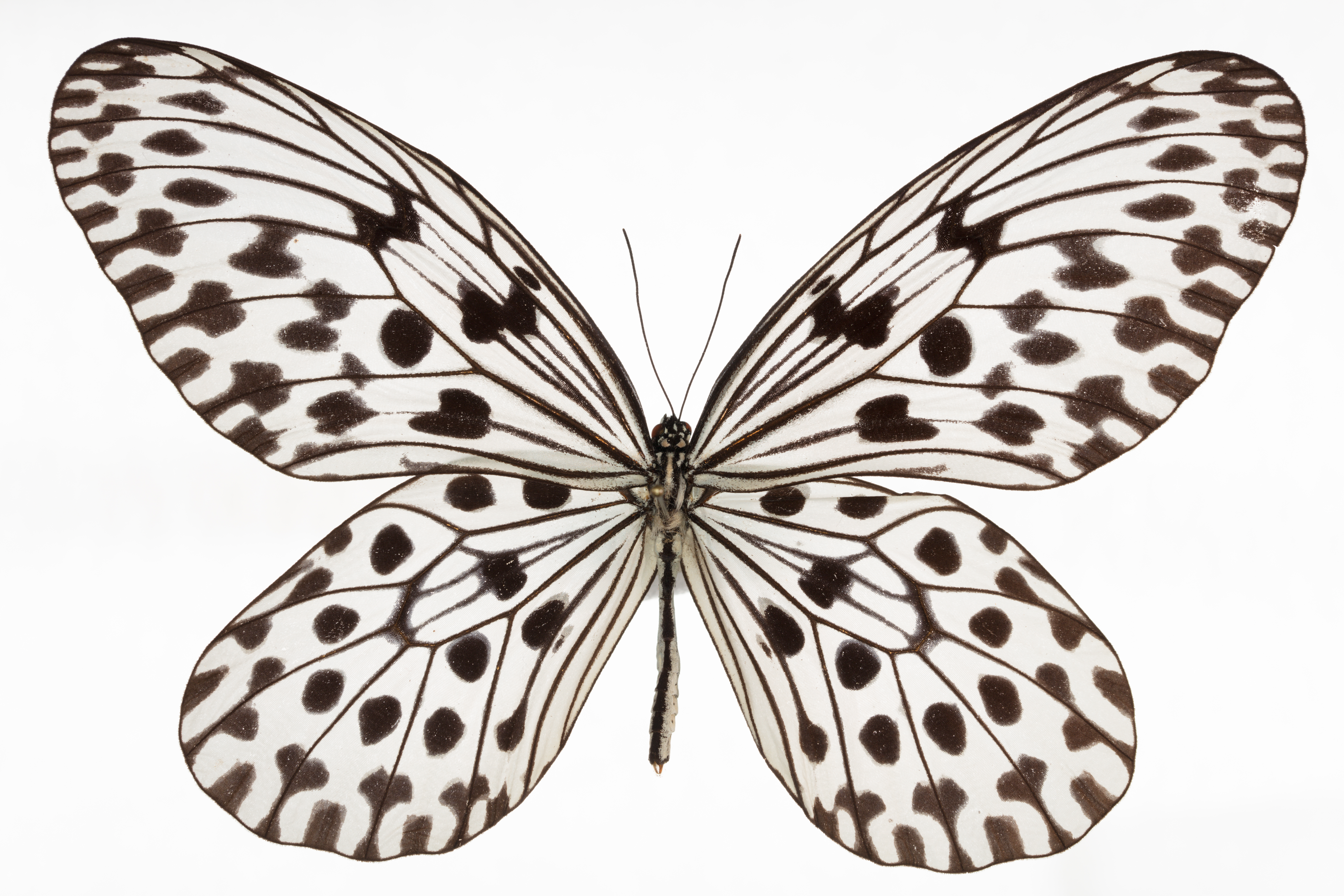
- Idea hypermnestra linteata

Scientific classification
- Domain: Eukaryota
- Kingdom: Animalia
- Phylum: Arthropoda
- Class: Insecta
- Order: Lepidoptera
- Family: Nymphalidae
- Genus: Idea
- Species: I. hypermnestra

Binomial name
- Idea hypermnestra (Westwood, 1848)

Synonyms
- Hestia hypermnestra Westwood, 1848; Hestia belia belina Fruhstorfer, 1898; Hestia belia vollenhoveni Fruhstorfer, 1898; arbela Fruhstorfer, 1910; Hestia belia Westwood, 1848; Hestia linteata Butler, 1879; Hestia hypermnestra hera Fruhstorfer, 1903

= Idea hypermnestra =

Species of butterfly

Idea hypermnestra is a large butterfly that belongs to the danaid group of the family Nymphalidae. It was described by John Obadiah Westwood in 1848. It is found in the Indomalayan realm. It is found in Thailand and Malaysia.

== Subspecies ==
- I. h. hypermnestra (Borneo)
- I. h. belia (Westwood, 1848) (Java)
- I. h. linteata (Butler, 1879) (Burma to Peninsular Malaysia, Langkawi)
- I. h. hera (Fruhstorfer, 1903) (Sumatra)
