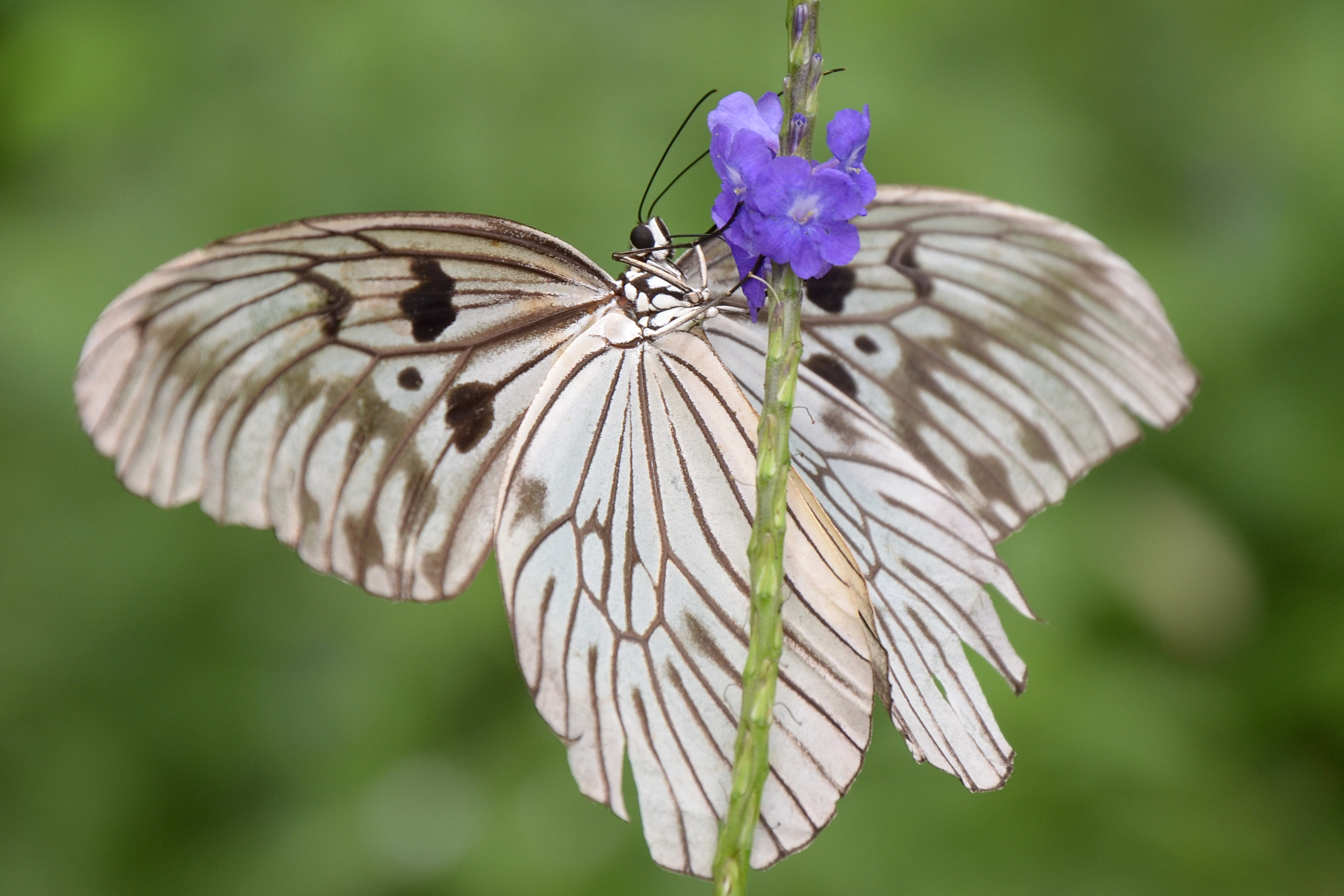

Scientific classification
- Domain: Eukaryota
- Kingdom: Animalia
- Phylum: Arthropoda
- Class: Insecta
- Order: Lepidoptera
- Family: Nymphalidae
- Genus: Idea
- Species: I. blanchardii

Binomial name
- Idea blanchardii Marchal, 1845

= Blanchard's ghost =

Species of butterfly

Blanchard's ghost (Idea blanchardii), is a butterfly in the family Nymphalidae., which was first described by Paul Marchal in 1845.

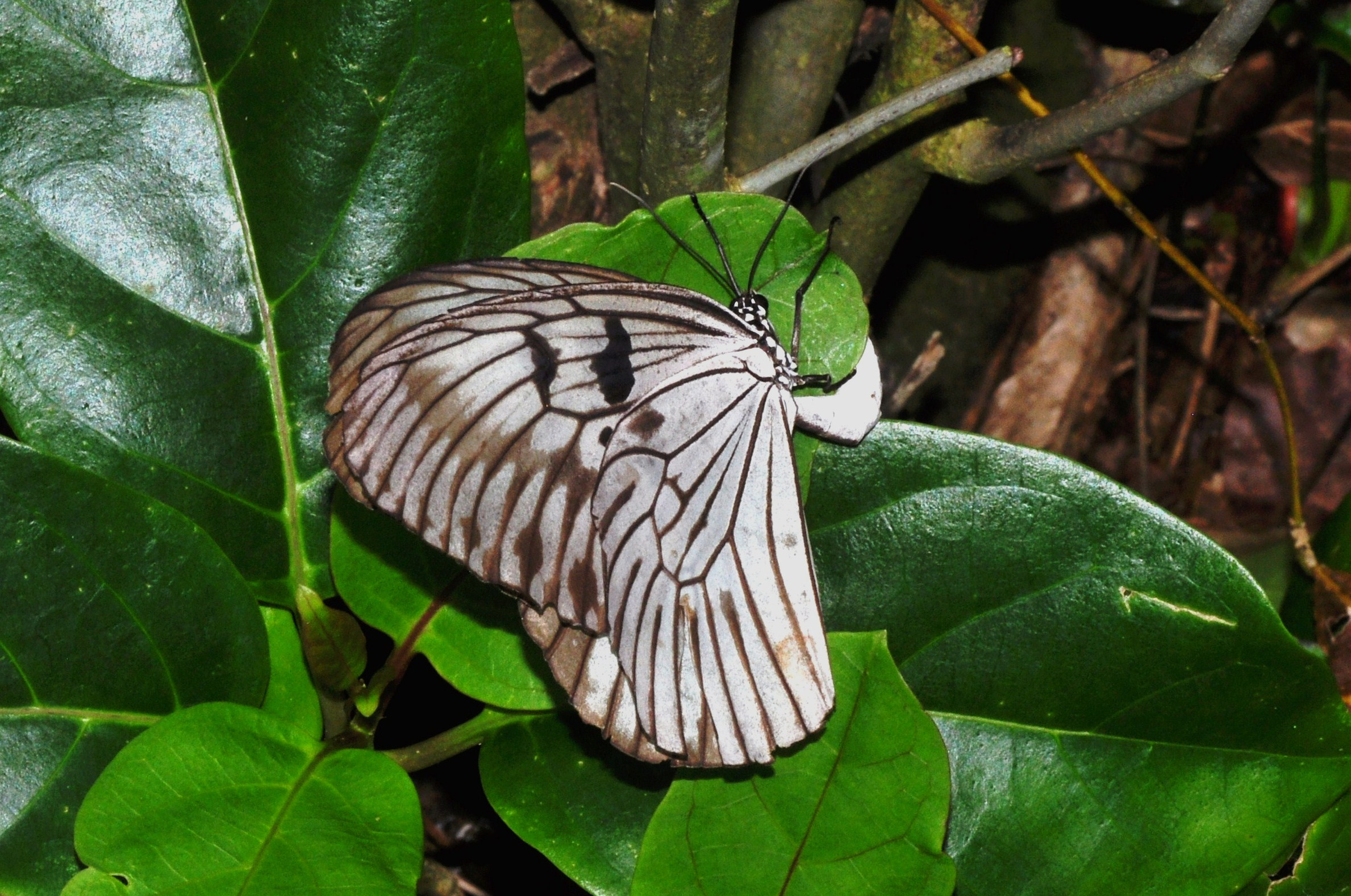
Laying an egg

They can be found on the island of Sulawesi in Indonesia.
