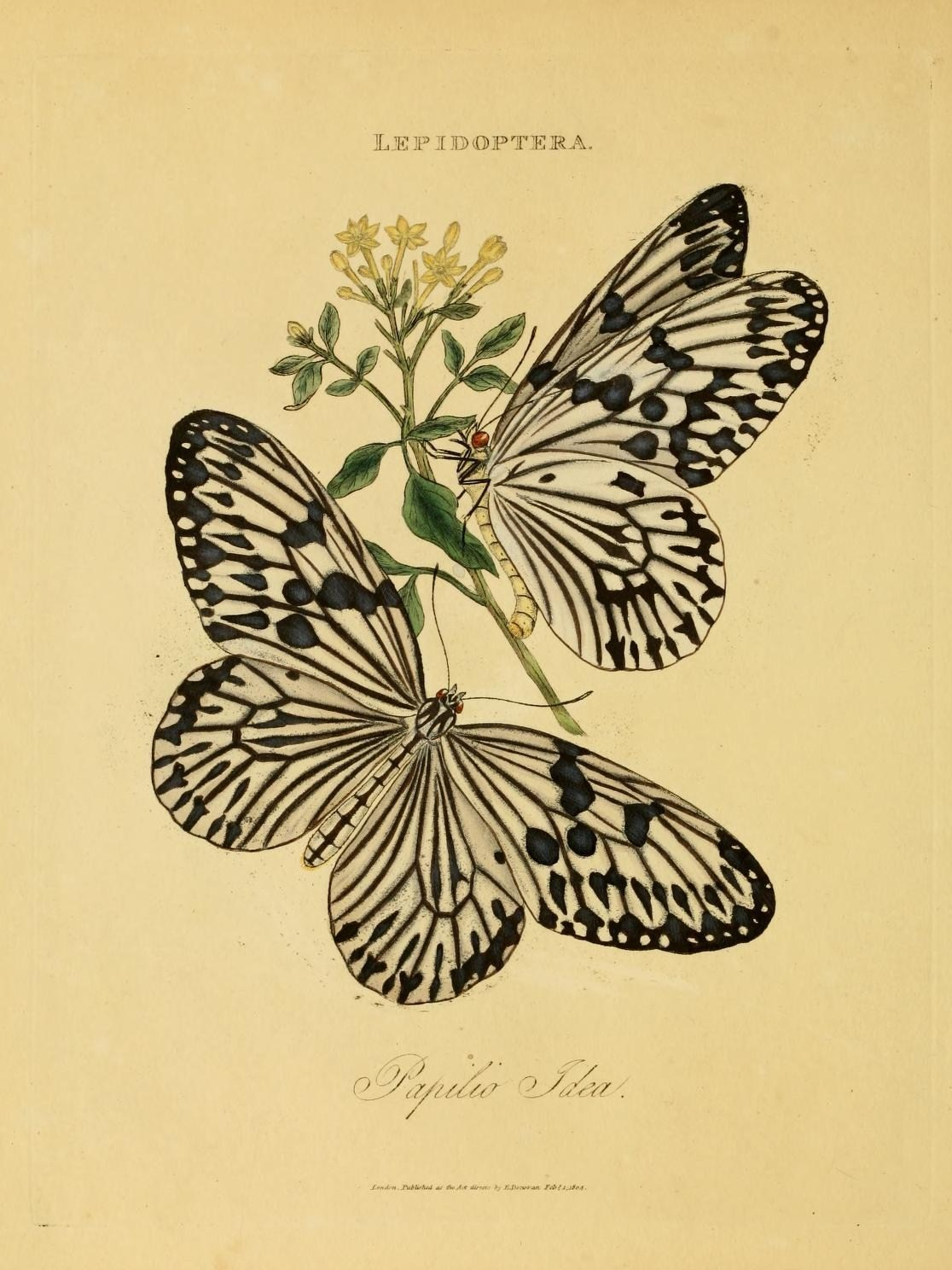
- In Edward Donovan's 1800 An Epitome of the Natural History of the Insects of India

Scientific classification
- Kingdom: Animalia
- Phylum: Arthropoda
- Class: Insecta
- Order: Lepidoptera
- Family: Nymphalidae
- Genus: Idea
- Species: I. idea

Binomial name
- Idea idea (Linnaeus, 1763)

Synonyms
- Papilio idea Linnaeus, 1763; Idea agelia Godart, 1819; Nectaria idea hertha Fruhstorfer, 1903; Hestia idea novella Fruhstorfer, 1910; Idea aza Boisduval, 1832; Hestia (Nectaria) sula de Nicéville, 1900

= Idea idea =

Linnaeus's idea

Species of butterfly

Idea idea, also known as Linnaeus's idea or rice paper, is a large butterfly that belongs to the danaid group of the family Nymphalidae. It was described by Carl Linnaeus in his 1763 Centuria Insectorum. It is found in the Australasian realm.

== Subspecies ==
- I. i. idea (Ambon, Seram)
- I. i. aza (Boisduval, 1832) (Buru)
- I. i. sula (de Nicéville, 1900) (Sula Islands)
