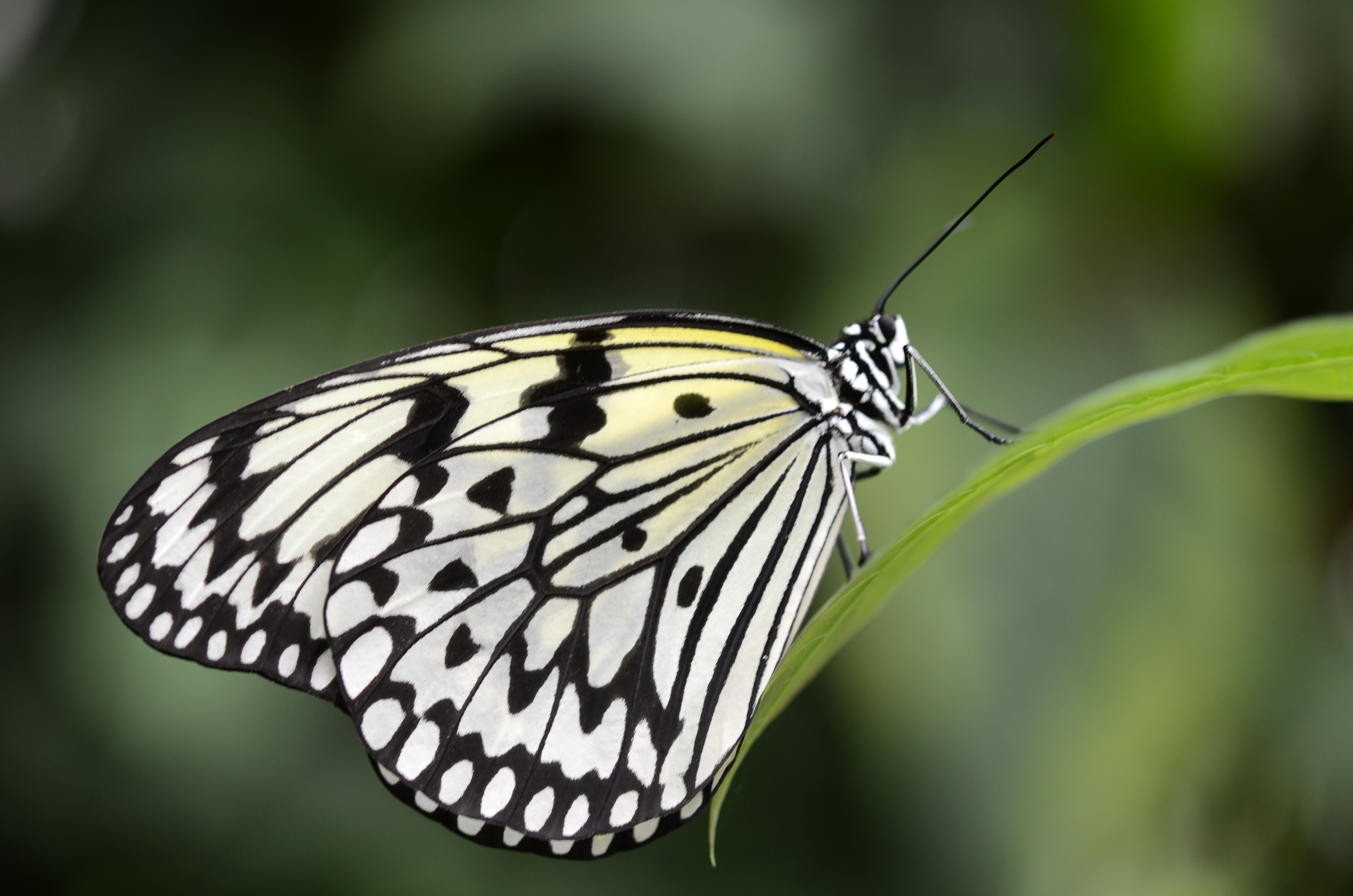
- Idea leuconoe, paper kite
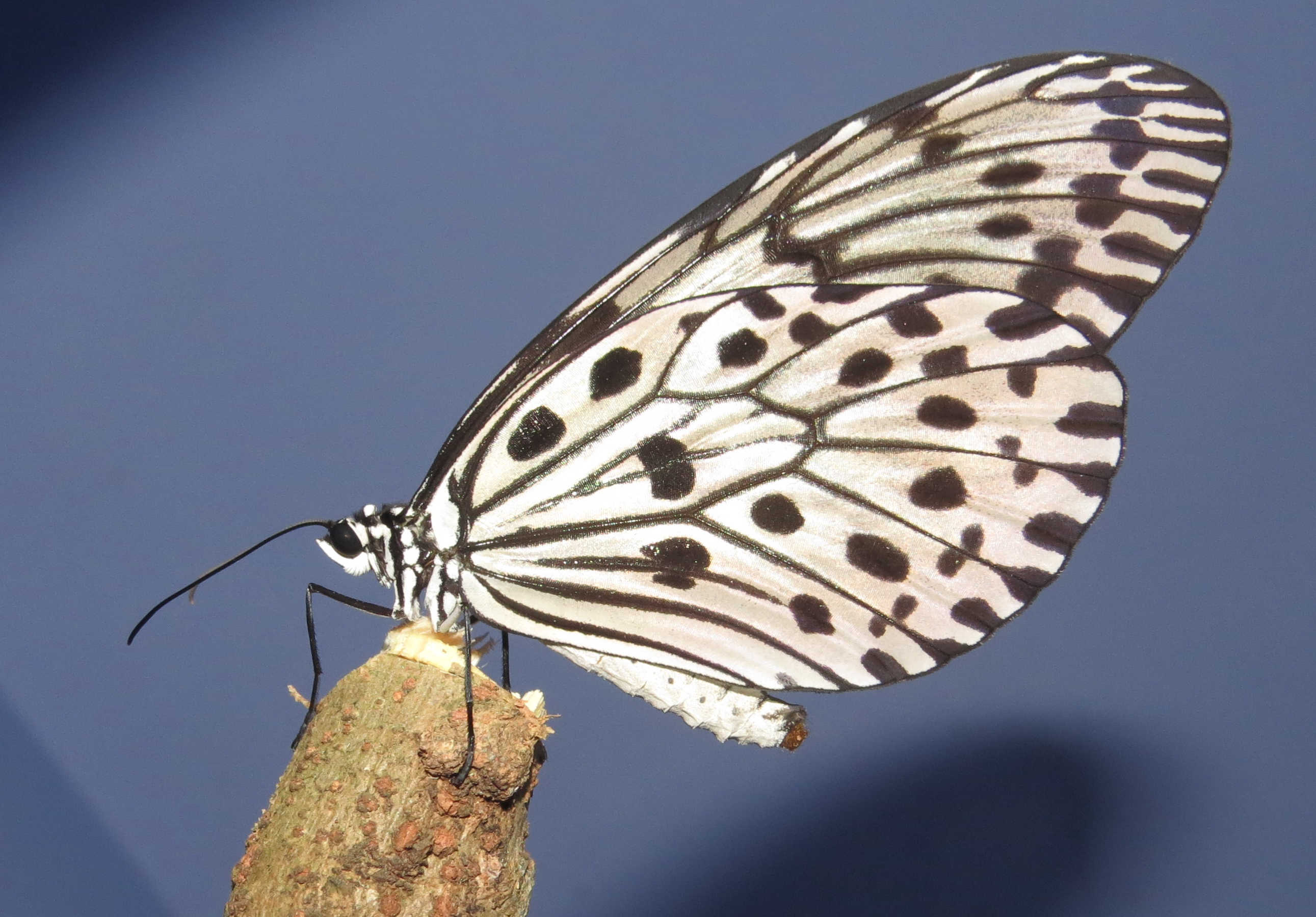
- Idea malabarica, Malabar tree-nymph

Scientific classification
- Kingdom: Animalia
- Phylum: Arthropoda
- Class: Insecta
- Order: Lepidoptera
- Family: Nymphalidae
- Subtribe: Euploeina
- Genus: Idea; Fabricius, 1807

Species
- See text

Synonyms
- Hestia Hübner; Idaea Oberthür, 1880; Nectaria Billberg, 1820; Sabalassa Moore, 1883

= Idea (butterfly) =

Genus of brush-footed butterflies

Idea (Hestia in older literature) is a genus of butterflies known as tree nymphs or paper butterflies. The member species are concentrated around South-East Asia. See Sevenia for the genus of African tree nymphs. These slender butterflies have very large, papery white wings with black veins and markings. They stay high up in the treetops where they flap around in slow flight. Like most other monarch butterflies ( Danaini ), wood nymphs are poisonous, and the striking colour patterns signal this. Several butterflies from other groups mimic these patterns.

== Description ==
Seitz - All the species which belong here are distinguished by their size and have a heavy, awkward flight, the weak muscles being evidently unable to control the enormous wings. Even a moderate breeze drives them helplessly hither and thither like pieces of light paper and probably on this account they never leave the shelter of the woods. The species of Hestia are among the largest butterflies, and they even attract the attention of the natives, who in India call them "spectres" or "ghosts", the Malays on Celebes give them the expressive name "surat", i.e. letter, and the Javanese that of "kupo kertas", i.e. paper-butterflv. The butterflies are mostly gregarious, are fond of following the course of small streams, above which they float up and down, also frequently gambol round high flowering forest-trees and love to settle in the late afternoon on projecting twigs, mostly in pairs, so that one might think they were beginning family life. The imagines are large, semitransparent butterflies with long, very thin antennae, scarcely thickened at the tip, without clubs or knobs. Claws, unlike Ideopsis, with appendages. The precostal of the hindwing arising distally to the subcostal, being bipartite and directed proximad. Forewing with five subcostals, of which two arise before the end of the cell, the first being united with the costal as in Ideopsis. Hindwing without patches of androconia or other scent-organs. Males, however, with two or four scent-pencils at the anal extremity. The Hestia differ from all other Danaids in the broad and always sharply armed valve, which is coarsely dentate or provided with widely projecting points, and form a group by themselves. The uncus is aborted. Larva of only two species yet known, approaching those of the Euploeid-group Trepsichrois, long, black, ringed, with lateral variegated patches above the prolegs and provided with four pairs of fleshy black tentacles. Pupa more slender than the bell-shaped pupa of the Danaids, with projecting points at the head, yellowish, black-dotted, without golden ornamentation

== Species ==
Listed alphabetically:

- I. agamarschana (C. & R. Felder, [1865]) – Andaman tree-nymph
- I. blanchardi Marchal, 1845 – black-trimmed rice paper
- I. durvillei Boisduval, 1832
- I. electra (Semper, 1878) – Electra's tree-nymph
- I. hypermnestra (Westwood, 1848)
- I. iasonia or I. jasonia (Westwood, 1848) – Ceylon tree-nymph
- I. idea (Linnaeus, 1763) – rice paper
- I. leuconoe Erichson, 1834 – paper kite
- I. lynceus (Drury, [1773]) – tree-nymph
- I. malabarica (Moore, 1877) – Malabar tree-nymph
- I. stolli (Moore, 1883) – common tree-nymph
- I. tambusisiana Bedford-Russell, 1981 – Bedford-Russell's tree-nymph or Sulawesi tree-nymph
