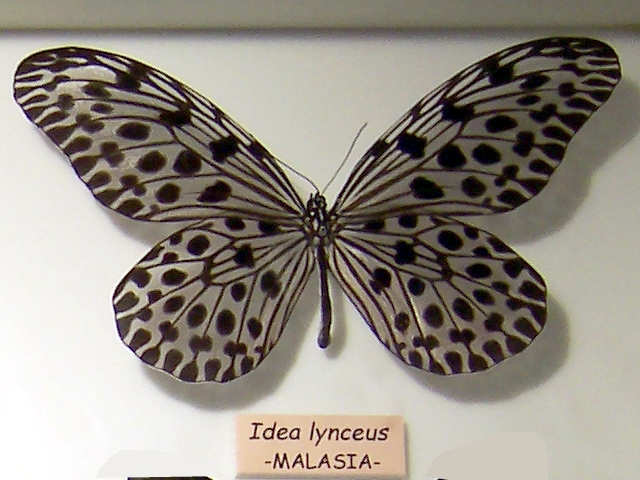

Scientific classification
- Kingdom: Animalia
- Phylum: Arthropoda
- Clade: Pancrustacea
- Class: Insecta
- Order: Lepidoptera
- Family: Nymphalidae
- Genus: Idea
- Species: I. lynceus

Binomial name
- Idea lynceus (Drury, 1773)

Synonyms
- Papilio lynceus Drury, [1773]; Hestia reinwardti Moore, 1883

= Idea lynceus =

Tree-nymph

Species of butterfly

Idea lynceus, the tree-nymph or Malaysian giant tree-nymph, is a species of nymphalid butterfly in the Danainae subfamily. It is found in South East Asia.

The wingspan is about 135–165 mm.

The larvae feed on Aganosma corymbosa.

== Subspecies ==
Listed alphabetically:

- I. l. favorinus Fruhstorfer, 1910
- I. l. fumata Fruhstorfer, 1897 (southern Borneo)
- I. l. lynceus (Malaysian giant tree-nymph)(Burma, Thailand, Peninsular Malaya, Langkawi, Sumatra)
- I. l. niasica Fruhstorfer, 1903 (Nias)
- I. l. reinwardti Moore, 1883
- I. l. thalassica Fruhstorfer, 1910
