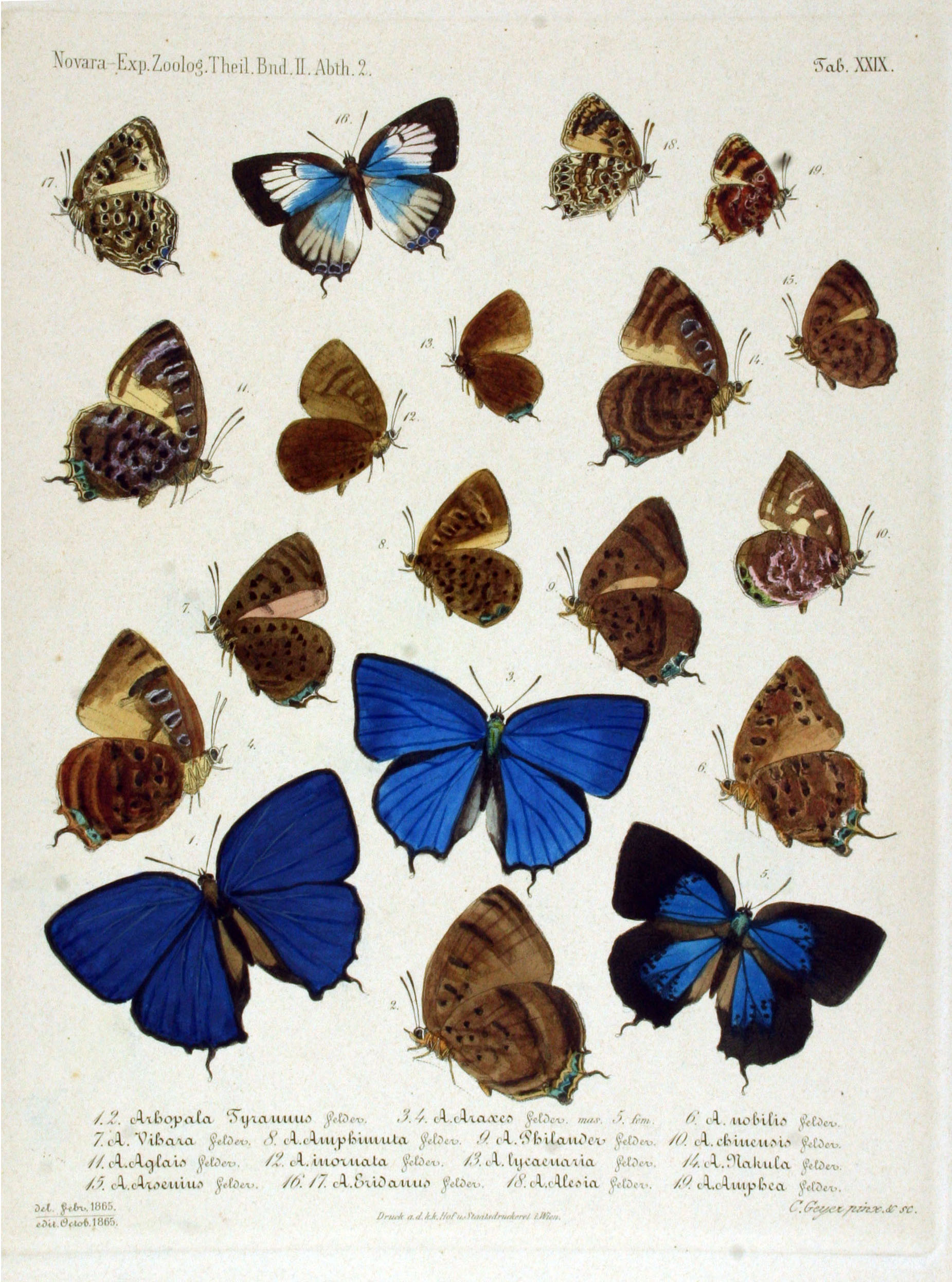
- Plate accompanying the original description.

Scientific classification
- Kingdom: Animalia
- Phylum: Arthropoda
- Clade: Pancrustacea
- Class: Insecta
- Order: Lepidoptera
- Family: Lycaenidae
- Genus: Arhopala
- Species: A. araxes

Binomial name
- Arhopala araxes C. & R.Felder, [1865]

= Arhopala araxes =

Species of butterfly

Arhopala araxes is a butterfly in the family Lycaenidae. It was described by Cajetan Felder and Rudolf Felder in 1865. It is found in the Indomalayan realm.

== Description ==
A. araxes is of the size of A.amantes which the under surface resembles, though the postmedian transverse band of the forewing is not distinctly interrupted behind the cell.The upper surface of the male shows almost the deep dark blue colour of the continental forms of A. centaurus, but the whole proximal parts of both wings are of a bright light blue (morpho-blue). In the female the upper surface is dark brown, the forewing with a medium-sized, the hindwing with a larger light blue discal spot, which in the forewing extends to the centre of the wing, in the hindwing a little beyond it.

== Subspecies ==
- A. a. araxes Sulawesi, Sula, Sanghie
- A. a. onetor Fruhstorfer, 1914 Sumatra, Java, Sumbawa, Sumba, Savu, Timor, Kissar, Wetar, Leti - more lustrous blue. The female has a broader hindwing margin, and the under surface is darker brown, the red-brown bands not so distinctly bordered with white
- A. a. talauta (Evans, 1957) Talaut Group
- A. a. verelius Fruhstorfer, 1914
