= List of endemic butterflies of Indonesia =

This list of endemic butterflies of Indonesia also of those endemic to New Guinea and Borneo (politically divided but biogeographic entities).

== Danainae ==
- Danaus ismare – Ismare tiger
- Euploea albicosta – Biak dark crow
- Euploea caespes – Murphy's crow
- Euploea configurata – Sulawesi striped blue crow
- Euploea cordelia – Cordelia's crow
- Euploea dentiplaga – Seram crow
- Euploea eleusina
- Euploea eupator – Sulawesi pied crow
- Euploea gamelia – Javan crow
- Euploea hewitsonii
- Euploea latifasciata – Weymer's crow
- Euploea magou – magou
- Euploea martinii – Sumatran crow
- Euploea morosa
- Euploea redtenbacheri
- Euploea tripunctata – Biak threespot crow
- Euploea westwoodii
- Idea blanchardii
- Idea durvillei
- Idea idea
- Idea tambusisiana – Bedford-Russell's tree-nymph
- Ideopsis hewitsonii – Hewitson's small tree-nymph
- Ideopsis klassika – Seram small tree-nymph
- Ideopsis oberthurii
- Ideopsis vitrea
- Ideopsis fojana Peggie, Vane-Wright & van Mastrigt 2009 – Indonesia, Papua Province, Pegunungan Foja
- Ideopsis klassika
- Parantica albata – Zinken's tiger
- Parantica cleona
- Parantica dabrerai – D'Abrera's tiger
- Parantica hypowattan – Morishita's tiger
- Parantica kuekenthali – Kuekenthal's yellow tiger
- Parantica marcia – Biak tiger
- Parantica menadensis – Manado yellow tiger
- Parantica philo – Sumbawa tiger
- Parantica pseudomelaneus – Javan tiger
- Parantica sulewattan – Bonthain tiger
- Parantica tityoides – Sumatran chocolate tiger
- Parantica toxopei – Toxopeus' yellow tiger
- Parantica wegneri – Flores tiger
- Miriamica thalassina (Joicey & Noakes, 1916) – West Irian (New Guinea) Arfak Mountains
- Tellervo jurriaansei Joicey & Talbot, 1922 – West Irian, Arfak Mountains
- Tellervo assarica (Stoll, [1781]) – Ambon, Serang, Buru, Misool, Waigeu
- Tellervo parvipuncta Joicey & Talbot, 1922 – Mioswar, West Irian
- Tellervo fallax (Staudinger, 1885) – West Irian (Snow Mts.), Misool, Waigeu (Solomon Islands)
- Tellervo nedusia (Geyer, 1832) – West Irian, Aru, Biak

== Morphinae ==
- Amathusia duponti Toxopeus, 1951 – Java
- Amathusia lieftincki Toxopeus, 1951 – Java
- Amathusia ochrotaenia Toxopeus, 1951 – Sumatra
- Amathusia taenia Fruhstorfer, 1899 – Java, Lombok, Bawean
- Amathusia virgata Butler, 1870 – Sulawesi
- Amathuxidia plateni (Staudinger, [1887]) – Sulawesi, Sula, Banggai
- Discophora bambusae C. & R. Felder, [1867] – Sulawesi
- Faunis menado (Hewitson, 1863) – Sulawesi
- Faunis saifuliana Hanafusa, 1993 – Indonesia, Mentawai Islands, Siberut Island
- Taenaris domitilla (Hewitson, 1861) – Moluccas, Bachan, Halmaheira, Obi
- Taenaris macrops (C. Felder & R. Felder, 1860)
- Taenaris scylla Staudinger, 1887 – Biak, Bosnik, Korido Islands
- Taenaris selene (Westwood, 1851)
- Taenaris urania (Linnaeus, 1758)

== Heliconiinae ==
- Algia satyrina (C. & R. Felder, [1867]) – Java, Sulawesi, Biak
- Cethosia myrina C. & R. Felder, [1867]
- Cethosia tambora Doherty, 1891 – Java, Timor, Bali
- Cirrochroa clagia (Godart, [1824]) – Java, Sumatra
- Cirrochroa eremita Tsukada, 1985
- Cirrochroa imperatrix Grose-Smith, 1894
- Cirrochroa niasica Honrath, 1892 – Nias, Kalim, Bungo
- Cirrochroa recondita Roos, 1996 – Sulawesi
- Cirrochroa semiramis C. & R. Felder, 1867 – Sulawesi
- Cirrochroa thule Felder & Felder, 1867
- Cupha crameri (Felder, 1860) – Ambon, Serang, Goram, Kai Island, West Irian, Kalao
- Cupha lampetia (Linnaeus, 1764) – Moluccas
- Cupha maeonides (Hewitson, 1859) – Sulawesi
- Cupha myronides Felder, 1860 – Moluccas

== Apaturinae ==
- Helcyra chionippe Felder, 1860 – Ambon, Ceram, New Guinea, Moluccas
- Helcyra takizawai Kotaki, 1985 – Flores, Sumba, Sumbawa, Alors, Moluccas
- Helcyra celebensis Martin, 1913 – Sulawesi
- Hestina divona (Hewitson, 1861) – Sulawesi

== Limenitidinae ==
- Athyma eulimene (Godart, [1824]) – Sulawesi
- Euthalia amabilis Staudinger, 1896 – Sula, North Maluku
- Lebadea alankara (Horsfield, [1829]) – Java, Sumatra, Borneo
- Lexias aegle (Doherty, 1891) – Lesser Sunda Islands
- Lexias immaculata Snellen, 1890 – Belitung (Sumatra)
- Lexias perdix (Butler, 1884) – Nias (Sumatra)
- Lexias elna (van de Poll, 1895) – Nias (Sumatra)
- Lexias aeetes (Hewitson, 1861) – Sulawesi
- Moduza lycone (Hewitson, 1859) – Sulawesi
- Moduza lymire (Hewitson, 1859) – Sulawesi
- Neptis celebica (Moore, 1899) – Sulawesi
- Neptis ida Moore, 1858 – Sulawesi
- Neptis nisaea de Nicéville, 1894 – Java
- Neptis brebissonii (Boisduval, 1832) – New Guinea
- Pantoporia antara (Moore, 1858) – Sulawesi
- Pantoporia mysia (C. & R. Felder, 1860) – Moluccas
- Tanaecia orphne Butler, 1870 – Borneo
- Tanaecia amisa Grose-Smith, 1889 – Borneo
- Tanaecia elone (de Nicéville, 1893) – Borneo, Sumatra
- Tanaecia trigerta (Moore, [1858]) – Java
- Tanaecia valmikis C. & R. Felder, [1867] – Borneo
- Tanaecia lutala (Moore, 1859) – Borneo
- Tanaecia vikrama C. & R. Felder, [1867] – Sumatra

== Cyrestinae ==
- Cyrestis nais Wallace, 1869 – Timor, Lombok, Sumba
- Cyrestis telamon Linnaeus, 1758 – Moluccas
- Cyrestis lutea (Zinken, 1831) – Java, Bali, Halimun, Salak
- Cyrestis thyonneus (Cramer, [1779]) – Sulawesi, Ambon, Serang, Saparua, Buru, Sula, Banggai
- Pseudergolis avesta C. & R. Felder, [1867]

== Charaxinae ==
- Charaxes affinis Butler, [1866]
- Charaxes cognatus Vollenhoven, 1861
- Charaxes dehanii Westwood, 1850
- Charaxes eurialus Cramer, 1779
- Charaxes mars Staudinger, 1885
- Charaxes nitebis (Hewitson, 1859)
- Charaxes ocellatus Fruhstorfer, 1896
- Charaxes pyrrhus (Linnaeus, 1758)

== Satyrinae ==
- Altiapa colorata Nishizawa, T. & Sibatani, A., 1984 – Java, Arfak
- Elymnias amoena Tsukada & Nishiyama, 1979 – Sumba
- Elymnias ceryx (Boisduval, 1836) Java, – Sumatra
- Elymnias cumaea C. & R. Felder, [1867] – Sulawesi
- Elymnias sangira Fruhstorfer, 1899 – Sanghie Islands, Sulawesi
- Elymnias cybele (C. & R. Felder, 1860) – West Irian, Moluccas
- Elymnias hewitsoni Wallace, 1869 – Sulawesi
- Elymnias hicetas Wallace, 1869 – Sulawesi
- Elymnias kamara Moore, [1858] – Java, Sumatra, Bali, Lombok
- Elymnias mimalon (Hewitson, 1861) – Sulawesi
- Elymnias nelsoni Corbet, 1942 – Mentawai Islands (Sumatra)
- Elymnias nepheronides Fruhstorfer, 1907 – Flores (Lesser Sunda Islands)
- Elymnias pellucida Fruhstorfer, 1895 – Borneo
- Elymnias vitellia (Stoll, [1781]) – Moluccas
- Elymnias detanii Aoki & Uémura, 1982 – Flores (Lesser Sunda Islands)
- Elymnias tamborana Okubo, 2010 – Sumbawa (Lesser Sunda Islands)
- Harsiesis hecaerge – Dutch New Guinea (West Irian)
- Harsiesis hygea (Hewitson, 1863) – New Guinea
- Hypocysta serapis Grose-Smith, 1894 – Misool, West Irian
- Morphopsis phippsi Joicey & Talbot, 1922 – New Guinea
- Mycalesis nala C. & R. Felder, 1859 – Java

== Nymphalinae ==
- Vanessa buana (Fruhstorfer, 1898) – Sulawesi
- Vanessa samani (Hagen, 1895) – Sumatra
- Vanessa dilecta Hanafusa, 1992 – Timor
- Mynes websteri Grose-Smith, 1894
- Hypolimnas diomea Hewitson, 1861 – Sangihe, Kabaena Sulawesi
- Hypolimnas pandarus (Linnaeus, 1758) – Moluccas
- Kallima paralekta (Horsfield, [1829])
- Symbrenthia hippalus C. & R. Felder, 1867

== Papilionidae ==
- Atrophaneura dixoni
- Atrophaneura hageni
- Atrophaneura kuehni
- Atrophaneura luchti
- Atrophaneura oreon
- Atrophaneura palu – Palu swallowtail
- Atrophaneura polyphontes
- Atrophaneura priapus – Priapus batwing
- Graphium agamemnon
- Graphium androcles
- Graphium deucalion
- Graphium dorcus
- Graphium encelades
- Graphium meyeri
- Graphium milon
- Graphium monticolus
- Graphium rhesus
- Graphium stresemanni
- Graphium sumatranum
- Ornithoptera aesacus – golden birdwing
- Ornithoptera croesus – Wallace's golden birdwing
- Ornithoptera rothschildi – Rothschilds's birdwing
- Ornithoptera tithonus – Tithonus birdwing
- Papilio ascalaphus
- Papilio blumei
- Papilio deiphobus
- Papilio diophantus
- Papilio forbesi
- Papilio gambrisius
- Papilio gigon
- Papilio heringi
- Papilio hipponous
- Papilio inopinatus
- Papilio jordani – Jordan's swallowtail
- Papilio lampsacus
- Papilio lorquinianus – sea green swallowtail
- Papilio neumoegeni
- Papilio peranthus
- Papilio sataspes
- Papilio tydeus
- Papilio veiovis
- Troides criton – Criton birdwing
- Troides dohertyi – Talaud black birdwing
- Troides haliphron – Haliphron birdwing
- Troides hypolitus – Rippon's birdwing
- Troides prattorum – Buru opalescent birdwing
- Troides riedeli – Riedel's birdwing
- Troides staudingeri
- Troides vandepolli – Van de Poll's birdwing

== Lycaenidae ==
- Poritia fruhstorferi Corbet, 1940 – Java, Sumatra
- Poritia phormedon Druce, 1895 – Borneo
- Poritia palos Osada, 1987 – Sulawesi
- Poritia personata Osada, 1994 – Sulawesi
- Deramas wolletti Eliot, 1970 – Borneo
- Deramas nigrescens Eliot, 1964 – Sulawesi
- Deramas masae Kawai, 1994 – Sulawesi
- Deramas nanae Osada, 1994 – Sulawesi
- Deramas suwartinae Osada, 1987 – Sulawesi
- Allotinus agnolia Eliot, 1986 – Sumatra
- Allotinus nicholsi Moulton, [1912] – Borneo, Sumatra
- Allotinus paetus (de Nicéville, 1895) – Sumatra
- Allotinus parapus Fruhstorfer, 1913 – Borneo
- Allotinus major C. & R. Felder, [1865] – Sulawesi
- Allotinus maximus Staudinger, 1888 – Sulawesi
- Allotinus brooksi Eliot, 1986 – Borneo
- Allotinus bidiensis Eliot, 1986 – Borneo
- Allotinus macassarensis (Holland, 1891) – Sulawesi
- Prosotas elsa (Grose-Smith, 1895) – Ambon, Maluku
- Prosotas ella Toxopeus, 1930 – Sulawesi
- Prosotas datarica (Snellen, 1892) – Java
- Prosotas norina Toxopeus, 1929 – Java
- Britomartis igarashii (H. Hayashi, 1976)
- Udara coalita (de Nicéville, 1891) – Java
- Udara aristinus (Fruhstorfer, 1917) – Java
- Udara toxopeusi (Corbet, 1937) – Sumatra
- Hypochrysops anacletus (Felder, 1860) – Ambon, Serang, Saparua
- Hypochrysops chrysanthis (Felder, 1860) – Ambon, Serang
- Hypochrysops doleschallii (Felder, 1860) – Serang, Ambon, Halmaheira
- Hypochrysops siren Grose-Smith, 1894 – Halmahera, Obi
- Hypochrysops calliphon Grose-Smith, 1894 – New Guinea
- Hypochrysops plotinus Grose-Smith, 1894 – New Guinea
- Hypochrysops hypates Hewitson, 1874 – Halmahera
- Hypochrysops eucletus C. & R. Felder, 1865 – New Guinea
- Hypochrysops rufinus Grose-Smith, 1898 – New Guinea
- Hypochrysops boisduvali Oberthür, 1894 – New Guinea
- Hypochrysops chrysodesmus Grose-Smith, 1899 – New Guinea
- Hypochrysops mirabilis Pagenstecher, 1894 – New Guinea
- Hypochrysops pyrodes Cassidy, 2003 – Sulawesi
- Hypochrysops bakeri (Joicey & Talbot, 1916) – New Guinea
- Hypochrysops ribbei (Röber, 1886) – New Guinea
- Hypochrysops makrikii (Ribbe, 1901) – Serang, Ambon
- Hypochrysops coruscans (Grose-Smith, 1897) – New Guinea, Serang
- Hypochrysops dinawa (Bethune-Baker, 1908) – New Guinea
- Hypochrysops pratti (Bethune-Baker, 1913) – New Guinea
- Hypochrysops utyi (Bethune-Baker, 1913) – New Guinea
- Arhopala alica Evans, 1957 – Borneo
- Arhopala dajagaka Bethune-Baker, 1896 – Borneo
- Arhopala baluensis Bethune-Baker, 1904 – Borneo
- Arhopala aenigma Eliot, 1972 – Borneo
- Arhopala weelii Piepers & Snellen, 1918 – Java
- Arhopala sceva Bethune-Baker, 1903 – Borneo, Sumatra
- Arhopala denta (Evans, 1957) – Borneo
- Arhopala sangira Bethune-Baker, 1897 – Sulawesi
- Arhopala axiothea (Hewitson, 1869]) – New Guinea
- Arhopala bella Bethune-Baker, 1896 – Borneo
- Arhopala borneensis Bethune-Baker, 1896 – Borneo
- Arhopala hercules (Hewitson, 1862) – New Guinea
- Arhopala helianthes Grose-Smith, 1902 – New Guinea
- Drupadia cinderella Cowan, 1974 – Borneo
- Drupadia cineas (Grose-Smith, 1889) – Borneo
- Drupadia cinesia (Hewitson, 1863) – Borneo
- Rapala vajana Corbet, 1940 – Java
- Tajuria lucullus Druce, 1904 – Borneo
- Tajuria discalis Fruhstorfer, 1897 – Flores, Java, Bali
- Philiris cyana (Bethune-Baker, 1908) – New Guinea
- Philiris violetta (Röber, 1926) – New Guinea
- Philiris sublutea (Bethune-Baker, 1906) – New Guinea
- Philiris caerulea Tite, 1963 – New Guinea
- Philiris hemileuca (Jordan, 1930) – New Guinea
- Philiris hypoxantha (Röber, 1926) – New Guinea
- Philiris helena (Snellen, 1887) – New Guinea, Moluccas
- Philiris philotoides Tite, 1963 – New Guinea
- Philiris ianthina Tite, 1963 – New Guinea
- Philiris agatha (Grose-Smith, 1899) – New Guinea
- Philiris montigena Tite, 1963 – New Guinea
- Philiris praeclara Tite, 1963 – New Guinea
- Philiris elegans Tite, 1963 – New Guinea
- Philiris lavendula Tite, 1963 – New Guinea
- Philiris ariadne Wind & Clench, 1947 – New Guinea
- Philiris unipunctata (Bethune-Baker, 1908) – New Guinea
- Philiris caelestis Sands, 1979 – New Guinea
- Philiris refusa (Grose-Smith, 1894) – New Guinea
- Philiris amethysta Sands, 1981 – New Guinea
- Philiris intensa (Butler, 1876) – New Guinea, Moluccas
- Philiris zadne (Grose-Smith, 1898) – New Guinea
- Philiris kumusiensis Tite, 1963 – New Guinea
- Philiris argenteus (Rothschild, 1915) – New Guinea
- Philiris scintillata Sands, 1981 – New Guinea
- Philiris aquamarina Sands, 1981 – New Guinea
- Philiris azula Wind & Clench, 1947 – New Guinea
- Philiris pagwi Sands, 1979 – New Guinea
- Philiris angabunga (Bethune-Baker, 1908) – New Guinea
- Philiris maculata Sands, 1981 – New Guinea
- Philiris biplaga Sands, 1981 – New Guinea
- Philiris remissa Tite, 1963 – New Guinea
- Philiris moluccana Tite, 1963 – Moluccas
- Philiris mayri Wind & Clench, 1947 – New Guinea
- Philiris misimensis Wind & Clench, 1947 – New Guinea
- Philiris cadmica Sands, 1981 – New Guinea
- Philiris phengotes Tite, 1963 – New Guinea
- Philiris dinawa (Bethune-Baker, 1908) – New Guinea
- Philiris moira (Grose-Smith, 1899) – New Guinea
- Philiris ignobilis (Joicey & Talbot, 1916) – New Guinea
- Philiris albicostalis Tite, 1963 – New Guinea
- Philiris marginata (Grose-Smith, 1894) – New Guinea
- Philiris doreia Tite, 1963 – New Guinea
- Philiris goliathensis Tite, 1963 – New Guinea
- Philiris vicina (Grose-Smith, 1898) – New Guinea
- Philiris albihumerata Tite, 1963 – New Guinea
- Philiris subovata (Grose-Smith, 1894) – New Guinea
- Philiris oreas Tite, 1963 – New Guinea
- Philiris kapaura Tite, 1963 – New Guinea
- Philiris baiteta Müller, 2014 – New Guinea
- Philiris bubalisatina Müller, 2014 – New Guinea
- Philiris hindenburgensis Müller, 2014 – New Guinea
- Philiris parsonsi Müller, 2014 – New Guinea
- Philiris petriei Müller, 2014 – New Guinea
- Philiris radicala Müller, 2014 – New Guinea
- Philiris sibatanii Sands, 1979 – New Guinea
- Philiris tapini Sands, 1979 – New Guinea
- Sidima amarylde Eliot & Kawazoé, 1983 – New Guinea
- Sukidion inores (Hewitson, 1872)
- Thamala moultoni Corbet, 1942 – Borneo

== Pieridae ==
- Appias aurosa (Yata & Vane-Wright) – Sulawesi
- Appias zarinda (Boisduval, 1836) – Sulawesi, Buru, Maluku
- Appias ithome (C. & R. Felder, 1859) – Sulawesi
- Cepora celebensis (Watanabe, 1987) – Sulawesi
- Cepora eperia (Boisduval, 1836) – Sulawesi
- Cepora fora (Watanabe, 1987) – Sulawesi
- Cepora timnatha (Hewitson, 1862) – Sulawesi
- Delias crithoe Boisduval 1836 – Java, Sumatra
- Delias momea (Boisduval, 1836) – Sumatra
- Delias fruhstorferi (Honrath, 1892) – Java
- Delias dorylaea (C. & R. Felder, [1865]) – Java
- Delias eileenae Joicey & Talbot, 1926 – Timor
- Delias belisama (Cramer, [1780]) – Java, Sumatra, Bali
- Delias eumolpe Grose-Smith, 1889 – Borneo
- Delias kuhni Honrath, 1886 – Sulawesi
- Delias battana Fruhstorfer, 1896 – Sulawesi
- Delias surprisa Martin, 1913 – Sulawesi
- Delias benasu Martin, [1913] – Sulawesi
- Delias rosenbergi (Vollenhoven, 1865) – Sulawesi
- Delias zebuda Hewitson, (1862) – Sulawesi
- Delias mitisana Staudinger, 1895 – Sulawesi
- Elodina effeminata (Fruhstorfer, 1910) – German New Guinea (West Irian)
- Eurema beatrix (Toxopeus, 1939) – Java
- Pareronia kyokoeae Nishimura, 1996 – Sumatra
- Ixias flavipennis Grose-Smith, 1885 – Sumatra
- Ixias malumsinicum Thieme, 1896 – Sumatra
- Ixias paluensis Martin, 1914 – Sulawesi
- Ixias piepersii (Snellen, 1878) – Sulawesi
- Ixias vollenhovii (Wallace, 1867) – Timor
- Ixias venilia (Godart, 1819) – Java

== Hesperiidae ==
- Pirdana albicornis Elwes & Edwards, 1897 – Borneo
- Pirdana ismene (C. & R. Felder, [1867]) – Sulawesi
- Celaenorrhinus entellus (Hewitson, 1867) – Java
- Celaenorrhinus saturatus Elwes & Edwards, 1897 – Java
- Celaenorrhinus toxopei de Jong, 1981 – Java
- Hasora alta de Jong, 1982 – Sumatra
- Hasora sakit Maruyama & Ueda, 1992 – Sulawesi
- Hasora umbrina (Mabille, 1891) – Sulawesi
- Caltoris beraka (Plötz, 1885) – Sulawesi, Sangihe, Sula Islands
- Caltoris mehavagga (Fruhstorfer, 1911) – Sulawesi, Sula Islands, Buru
- Mooreana boisduvali (Mabille, 1876) – Celebes
- Koruthaialos focula (Plötz, 1882) – Java, Sumatra, Borneo
- Isma cinnamomea (Elwes & Edwards, 1897) – Borneo, Sumatra
- Isma binotata Elwes & Edwards, 1897 – Borneo
- Mimene kolbei (Ribbe, 1899) – New Guinea
- Mimene melie (de Nicéville, 1895) – New Guinea
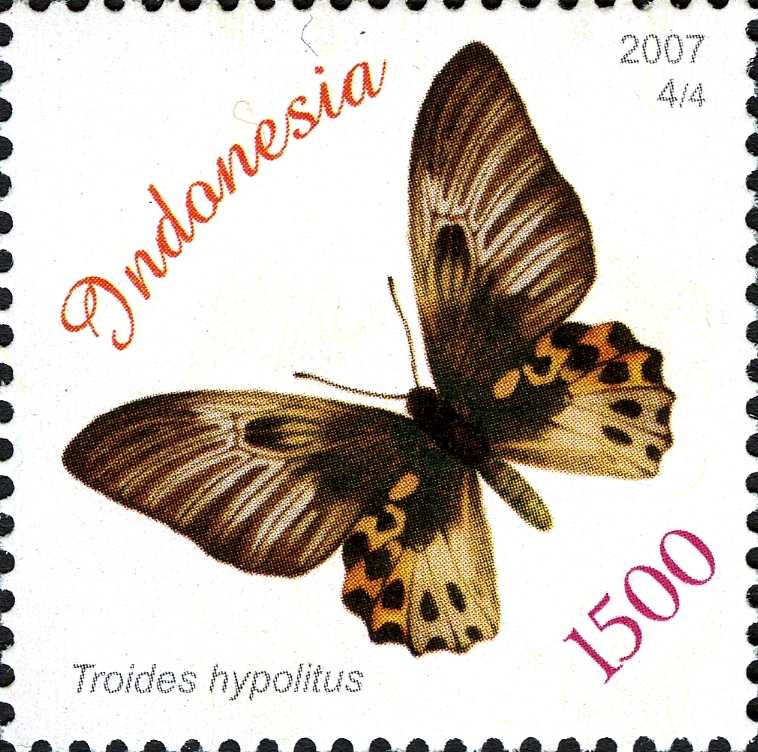

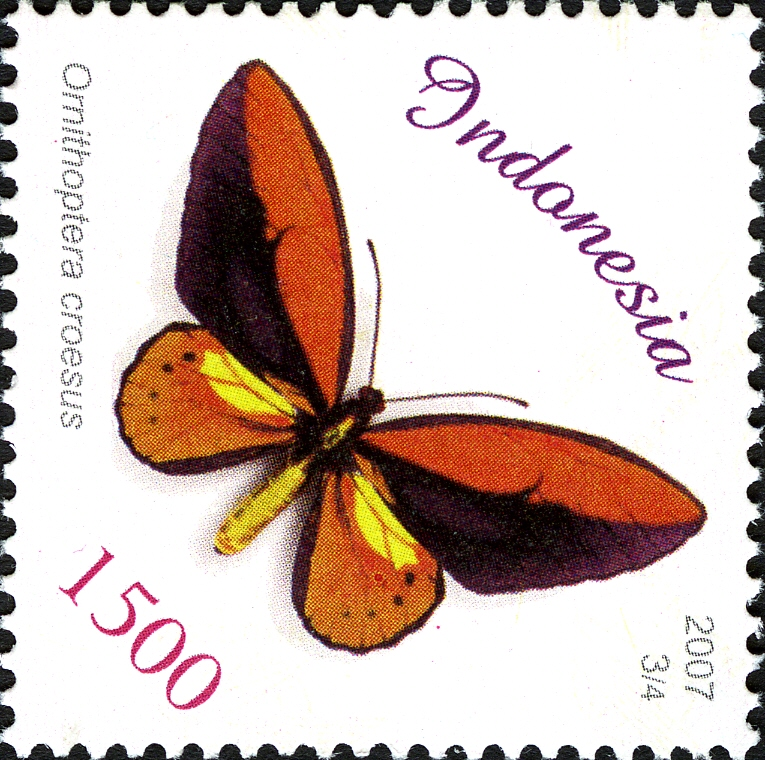

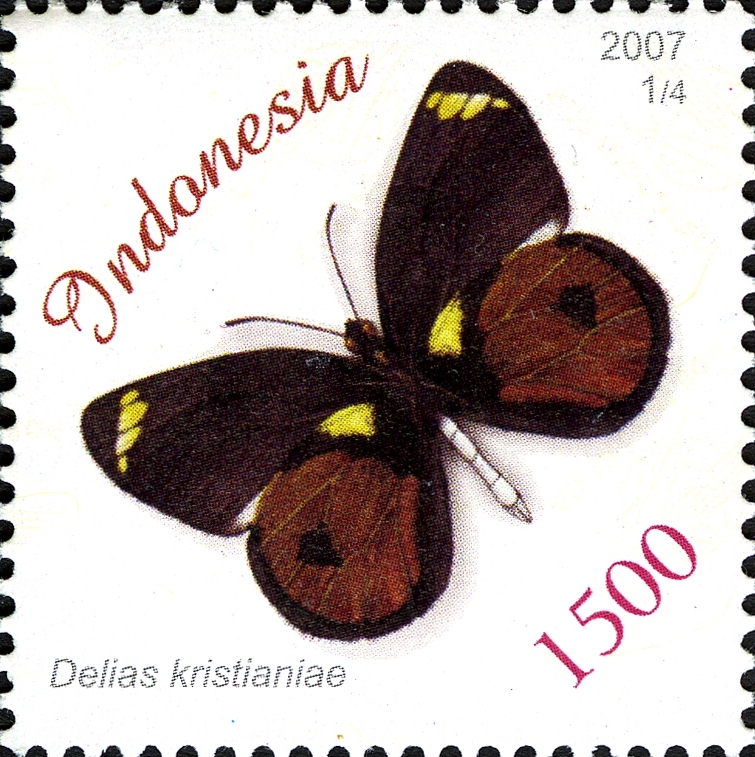

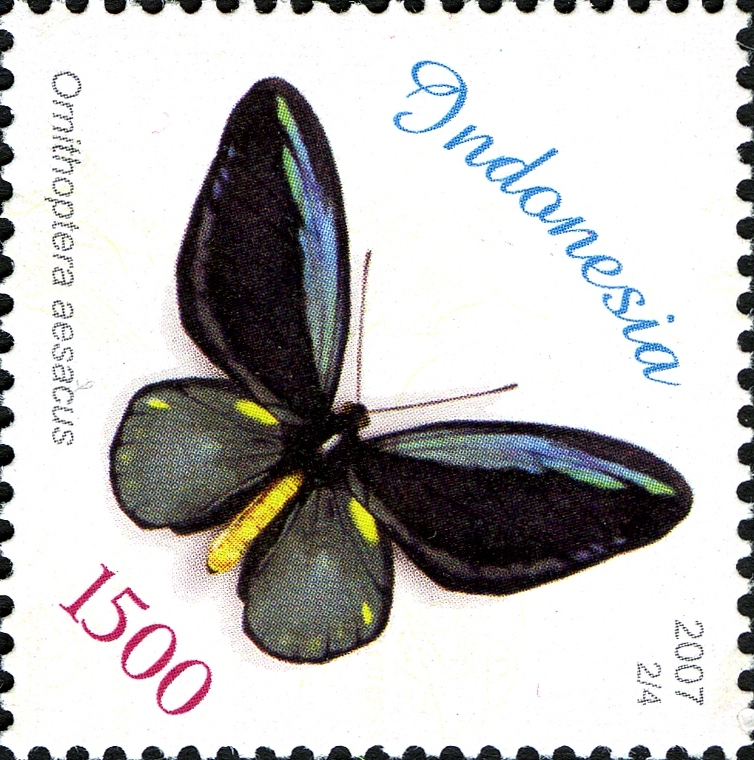

== See also ==
- List of butterflies of Sulawesi
- List of butterflies of Peninsular Malaysia
- List of butterflies of Papua New Guinea
- Bogor Zoology Museum
