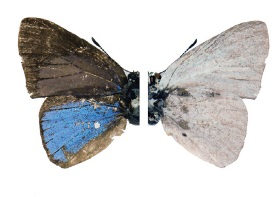
- P. f. fulgens
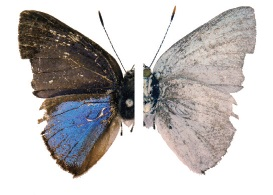
- P. f. septentrionalis

Scientific classification
- Domain: Eukaryota
- Kingdom: Animalia
- Phylum: Arthropoda
- Class: Insecta
- Order: Lepidoptera
- Family: Lycaenidae
- Genus: Philiris
- Species: P. fulgens

Binomial name
- Philiris fulgens (Grose-Smith & Kirby, 1897)

Synonyms
- Holochila fulgens Grose-Smith & Kirby, 1897; Philiris kurandae Waterhouse, 1902

= Philiris fulgens =

Species of butterfly

Philiris fulgens, the purple moonbeam, is a species of butterfly of the family Lycaenidae. It is found in Indonesia, New Guinea and Australia (northern Queensland).

== Subspecies ==
- P. f. fulgens (Moluccas, Ambon, Serang)
- P. f. bicolorata Wind & Clench, 1947 (Aru)
- P. f. kurandae Waterhouse, 1902 (Australia: Cairns district)
- P. f. septentrionalis Joicey & Talbot, 1916 (Biak, Kapaur)
