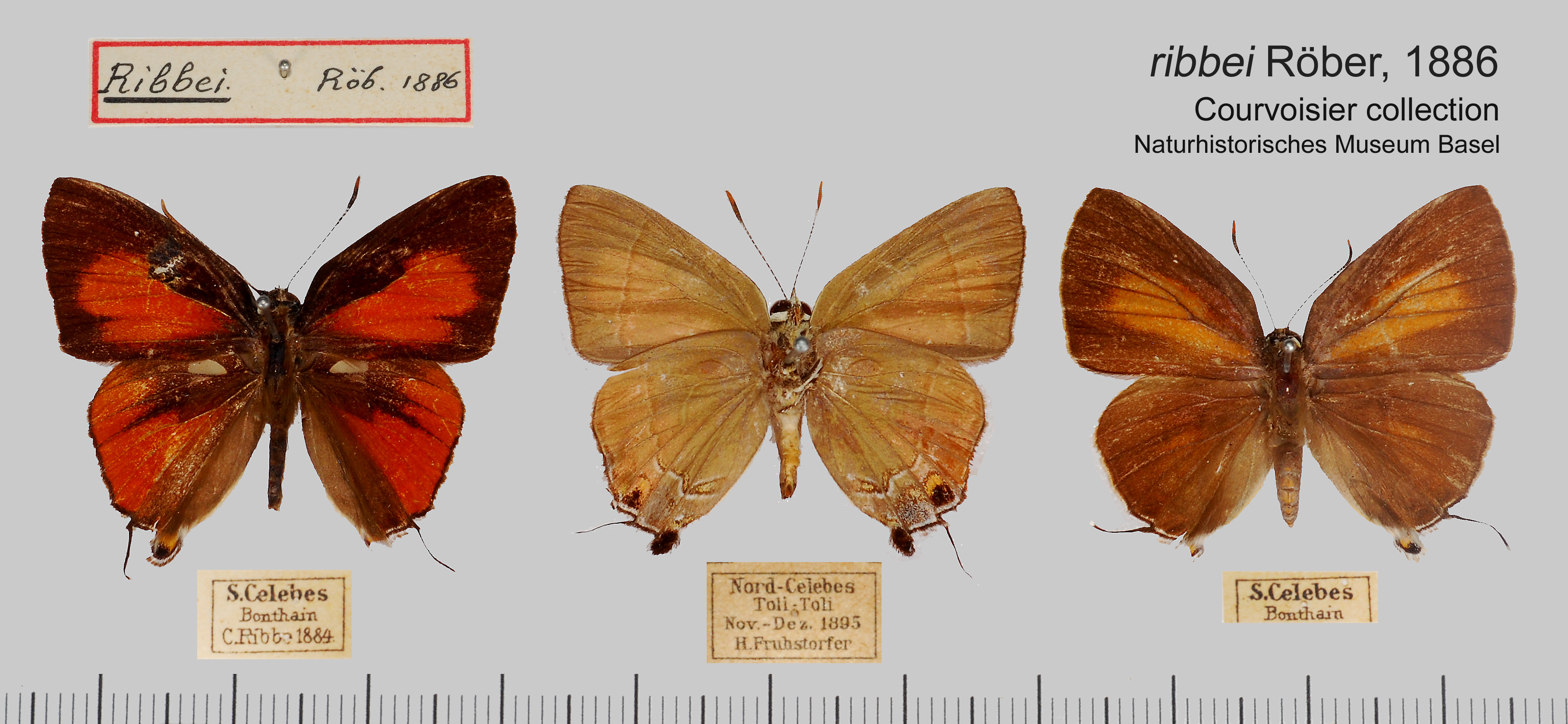
- From the Courvoisier Collection, Basel, Switzerland

Scientific classification
- Kingdom: Animalia
- Phylum: Arthropoda
- Clade: Pancrustacea
- Class: Insecta
- Order: Lepidoptera
- Family: Lycaenidae
- Genus: Rapala
- Species: R. ribbei

Binomial name
- Rapala ribbei Röber, 1886

Synonyms
- Rapala colossus Ribbe, 1926; Rapala irregularis Ribbe, 1926

= Rapala ribbei =

Species of butterfly

Rapala ribbei is a butterfly in the family Lycaenidae. It was described by Julius Röber in 1886. It is endemic to Sulawesi. The name honours Carl Ribbe.
