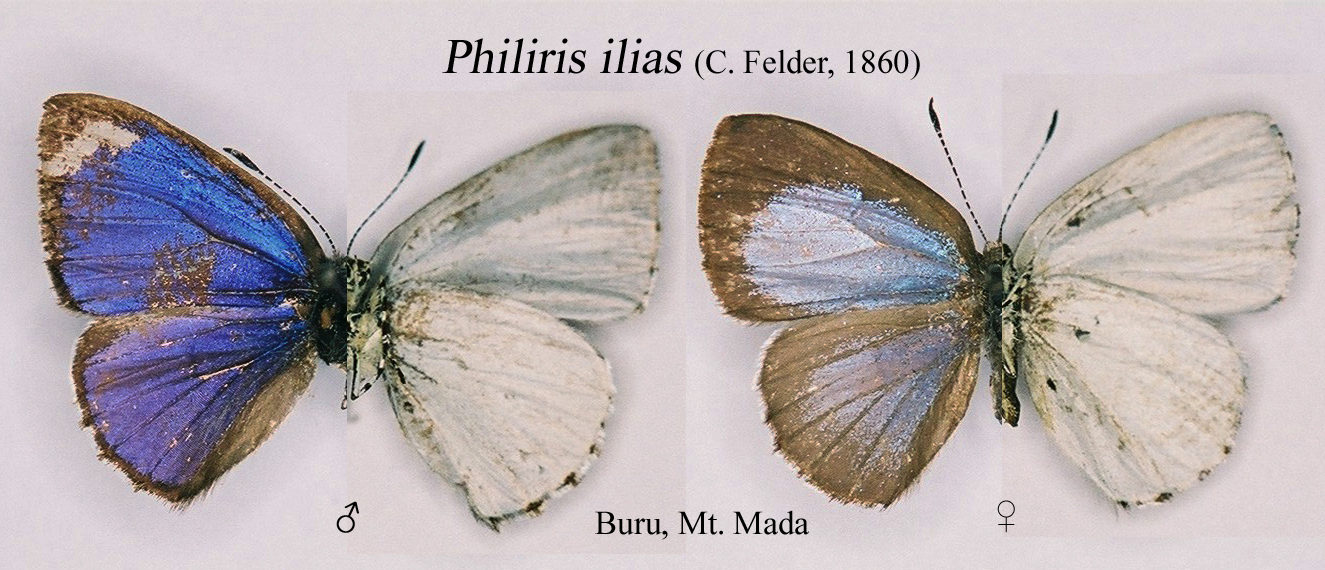
- Philiris ilias

Scientific classification
- Kingdom: Animalia
- Phylum: Arthropoda
- Clade: Pancrustacea
- Class: Insecta
- Order: Lepidoptera
- Family: Lycaenidae
- Tribe: Luciini
- Genus: Philiris; Julius Röber, 1891

Synonyms
- Philiris Röber, in Staudinger & Schatz, 1892; Titea Eliot, 1973

= Philiris =

Butterfly genus in family Lycaenidae

Philiris is a genus of butterflies in the family Lycaenidae. The species of this genus are found in the Australasian realm (New Guinea, Bismarck Islands, Molucca Islands and eastern Australia,( Queensland)), mostly inhabiting tropical rainforests. Philiris was erected by Julius Röber in 1891. It is a speciose genus. Tite decided on 56 species. Sands added 11 species and placed the taxa into 21 species groups (broadly accepted by Parsons). Most species are in New Guinea. Tite considered Philiris and Candalides Hübner, 1819 to be sisters. Eliot (1973) placed Philiris in Luciini Waterhouse & Lyell, 1914, close to Hypochrysops C. et R. Felder, 1860. Compared to other members of the tribe, Philiris have relatively uniform ventral patterns with usually silvery-white ground color.

== Species ==
- Philiris agatha
- Philiris albicostalis New Guinea, Astrolabe Bay.
- Philiris albihumerata
- Philiris albiplaga
- Philiris amethysta New Guinea, Central District, Subitana
- Philiris angabunga
- Philiris apicalis
- Philiris aquamarina New Guinea, Central District, Subitana
- Philiris argenteus Dutch New Guinea, Utakwa River
- Philiris azula New Guinea, Morobe District, Wau
- Philiris baiteta Müller, 2014
- Philiris biplaga New Guinea, Chimbu Province
- Philiris bubalisatina Müller, 2014
- Philiris cadmica Papua
- Philiris caelestis New Guinea, Morobe Province, Hobu
- Philiris cyana
- Philiris diana Waterhouse et Lyell, 1914 - Large Moonbeam
- Philiris dinawa
- Philiris doreia Papua
- Philiris elegansNew Guinea, Arfak Mts.
- Philiris fulgens
- Philiris gloriosa (Bethune-Baker, 1908)
- Philiris harterti
- Philiris helena West Papua, Roon Island
- Philiris hemileuca
- Philiris hindenburgensis Müller, 2014
- Philiris hypoxantha
- Philiris ianthina New Guinea, Arfak Mts.
- Philiris ignobilis Papua Wandammen Mts
- Philiris iliasIndonesia, Moluccas, Ambon
- Philiris innotatus Australia
- Philiris intensa
- Philiris kumusiensis British New Guinea, Kumusi River
- Philiris lavendula
- Philiris lucescens Bismarck Archipelago
- Philiris maculata New Guinea, Central Highlands
- Philiris marginata
- Philiris mayri Dutch New Guinea, Central Highlands
- Philiris melanacra Bismarck Archipelago
- Philiris misimensis New Guinea, Mt. Misim
- Philiris moira Fergusson Island
- Philiris moluccana Indonesia, Moluccas, Obi
- Philiris montigena Tite, 1963 New Guinea, Mt. Goliath
- Philiris nitens Queensland
- Philiris oreas
- Philiris pagwi New Guinea, East Sepik Province
- Philiris papuanus Wind et Clench, 1947
- Philiris parsonsi Müller, 2014
- Philiris petriei Müller, 2014
- Philiris phengotes Papua, Kojoda
- Philiris philotas Indonesia, Moluccas, Ambon
- Philiris philotoides Papua, Aroa River
- Philiris praeclara Tite, 1963 New Guinea, Hydrographer Mts
- Philiris putih British New Guinea, Port Moresby
- Philiris radicala
- Philiris refusa Müller, 2014 Papua, Humboldt Bay
- Philiris remissa New Guinea, Kumusi River
- Philiris satis Papua, "Eio Creek., Musgrave River
- Philiris scintillata Papua, "Eio Creek., Musgrave River
- Philiris siassi Sands, 1981
- Philiris sibatanii New Guinea New Guinea, Morobe Provin
- Philiris subovata Papua, Humboldt Bay
- Philiris tapini New Guinea, Central Province
- Philiris tombara New Ireland.
- Philiris unipunctata
- Philiris vicina
- Philiris violetta (Röber, 1926) German New Guinea
- Philiris zadne New Guinea, Mailu
- Philiris ziska
