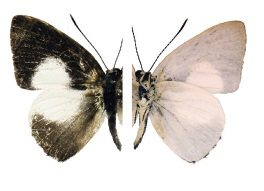
- Philiris harterti harterti
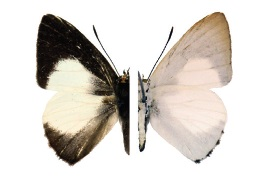
- Philiris harterti leucoma

Scientific classification
- Domain: Eukaryota
- Kingdom: Animalia
- Phylum: Arthropoda
- Class: Insecta
- Order: Lepidoptera
- Family: Lycaenidae
- Genus: Philiris
- Species: P. harterti

Binomial name
- Philiris harterti (Grose-Smith, 1894)

Synonyms
- Holochila harterti Grose-Smith, 1894

= Philiris harterti =

Species of butterfly

Philiris harterti is a species of butterfly of the family Lycaenidae. It is found in New Guinea.

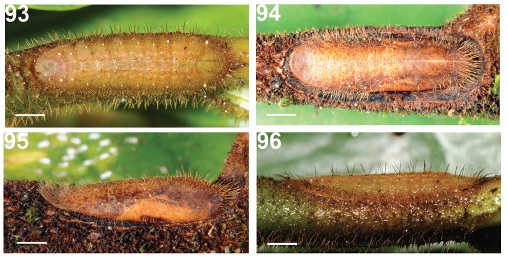
Larva and pupa

The larvae feed on Litsea callophyllantha.

== Subspecies ==
- Philiris harterti harterti (West Irian)
- Philiris harterti leucoma Tite, 1963 (Papua: Hydrographer Mountains, Aroa Range, Kumusi Range)
- Philiris harterti melanoma Tite, 1963 (Yapen Island)
