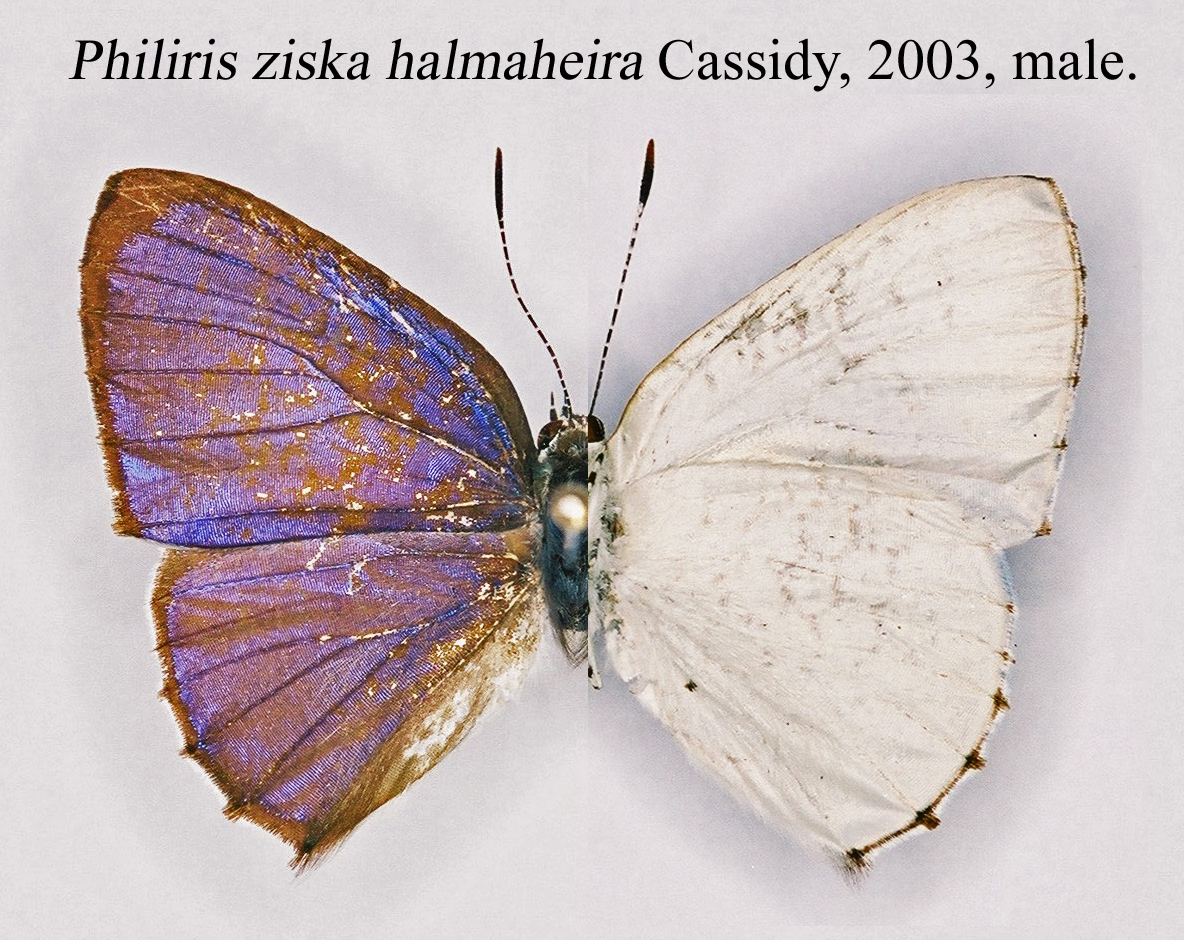

Scientific classification
- Domain: Eukaryota
- Kingdom: Animalia
- Phylum: Arthropoda
- Class: Insecta
- Order: Lepidoptera
- Family: Lycaenidae
- Genus: Philiris
- Species: P. ziska

Binomial name
- Philiris ziska (Grose-Smith, 1898)

Synonyms
- Holochila ziska Grose-Smith, 1898; Candalides pratti Bethune-Baker, 1908

= Philiris ziska =

Species of butterfly

Philiris ziska is a species of butterfly of the family Lycaenidae. It is found in New Guinea and Queensland, Australia.

The larvae feed on Trophis scandens, and develops through six instars.

== Subspecies ==
- Philiris ziska ziska (Waigeu, West Irian to Papua New Guinea)
- Philiris ziska halmaheira Cassidy, 2003
- Philiris ziska titeus D'Abrera, 1971 (Australia: Queensland)
