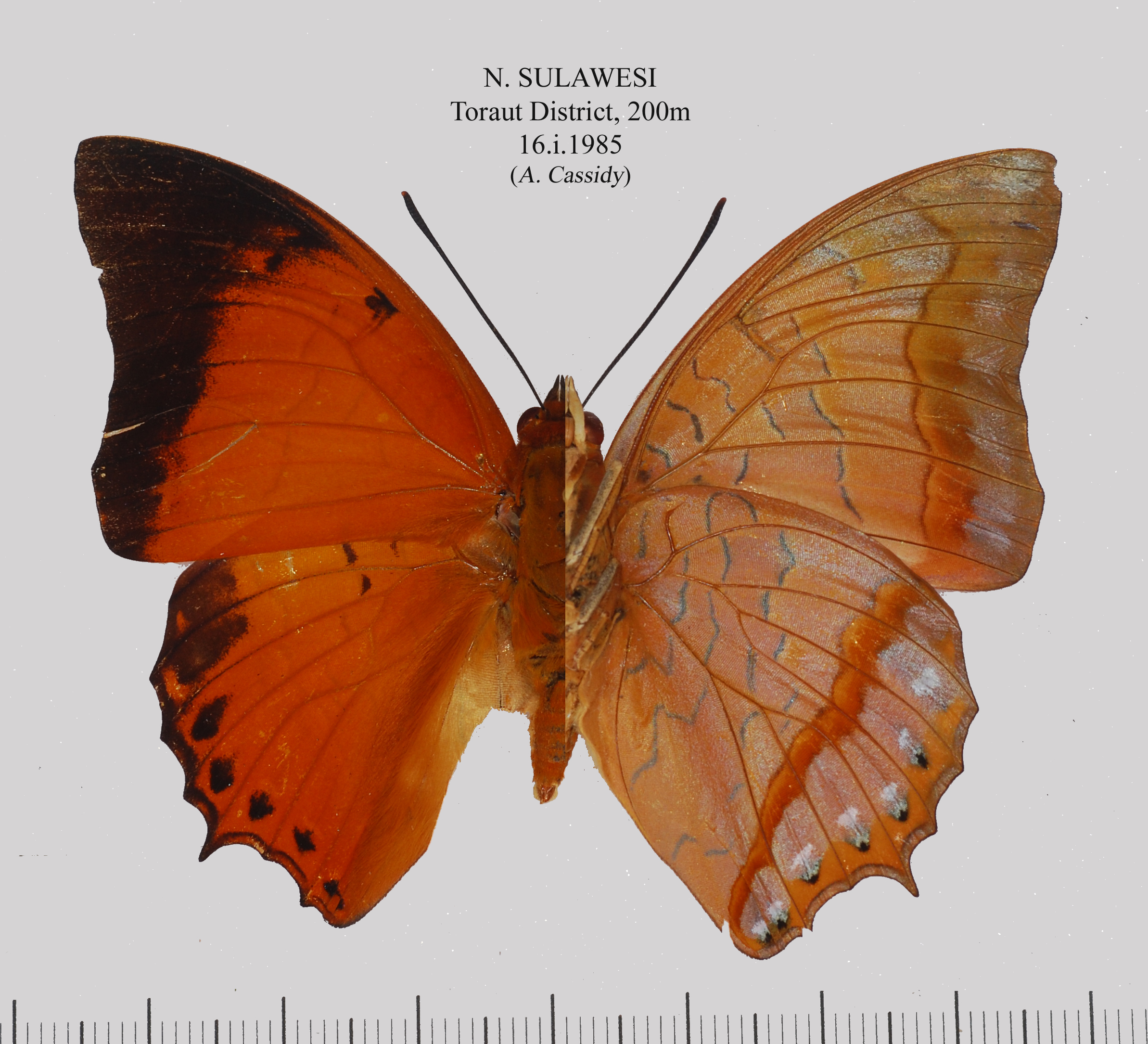

Scientific classification
- Kingdom: Animalia
- Phylum: Arthropoda
- Class: Insecta
- Order: Lepidoptera
- Family: Nymphalidae
- Genus: Charaxes
- Species: C. affinis

Binomial name
- Charaxes affinis Butler, [1866]

Synonyms
- Charaxes parmenion C. & R. Felder, [1867]; Charaxes demonax C. & R. Felder, [1867]; Charaxes wallacei Butler, 1872

= Charaxes affinis =

Species of butterfly

Charaxes affinis is a butterfly in the family Nymphalidae. It was described by Arthur Gardiner Butler in 1866. It is found in the Indomalayan realm.

== Description ==
Charaxes affinis is a large, sexually dimorphic butterfly (wingspan 66-75mm). The upperside of the male is orange-brown with a broad dark brown or black marginal band on the forewings, and a submarginal line of brown or black spots and a small tail on the hindwings. Its patterns and colours are extremely variable.

== Technical description ==
The body of both male and female Charaxes affinis, especially the thorax, are less bright tawny orange than the wings, more ochre-coloured.

Length of forewing: male 38–44 mm, female 50–53 mm.

Males' wings are bright tawny orange, with a largely buff-coloured abdominal fold. Forewings are rather falcate, outer edge either nearly entire, or denticulate; posterior half or two-thirds of bar D obsolete; median bars SC^{5}—R^{2} heavy, forming generally triangular patches which are more or less fused with the black outer area, but the second stands sometimes quite isolated, median bar R^{3}—M^{1} seldom clearly marked above, about 6mm distant from origin of M1 (as on underside); black postdisco-marginal area much narrower behind than in front, measuring about 4 mm at SM^{2}; discal bar M^{2}—SM^{2} present, either heavy and separated from black border of the wing by a small tawny orange spot between veins, or feeble and then more or less completely isolated (in all specimens from North Celebes?), bar M^{1}—M^{2} stands also often partly separated from the black border. These discal bars much more distal than the discal bars of the underside; edge of wing has two minute tawny dots between M^{2} and SM^{2} in the greater number of individuals; fringe white between veins.

Hindwing somewhat variable in shape. The anal angle more prominent in some specimens than in others; median bar C—SC^{2} seldom absent, in some specimens also bar SC^{2}—R^{1} marked; postdisco-submarginal patches C—R^{1} large, the others small, patch SC^{2}-R^{1} at least 6 mm long, the black scaling extending. In many specimens along SC^{2} basad for several millimetres, all the other patches separated from one another; white submarginal dots within those patches are variable, often partly absent; admarginal line black, sharply marked, separated from edge of wing, posteriorly between the veins where it is generally thin, from C to R^{3} it is generally heavy, dilated along the veins and joined to, or partly fused with, the postdisco-submarginal patches; upper tail acute, 3–4 mm. long, second very short, sometimes not so much prominent as the teeth SC^{2}—R^{2}.

Underside: varying from ochraceous to ochre yellow, the glossy parts appearing darker (slaty grey) in side light, the discal interspaces lighter at the median bars. All the bars much thinner than in C. latona.

Forewing: submedian bar M^{1}—M^{2} rather oblique, bar M^{2}—(SM^{1}) about midway between base of M^{2} and bar M^{1}—M^{2}, often also oblique, bar R^{3}—M^{1} always about (in both sexes); discal bars more distal than in C. latona, less arched, the series not interrupted at R^{2}; postdiscal patches very obscurely marked, with ill-defined, white patches at their distal side, of which the middle ones are mostly very feeble; upper cell-bar curved twice, the middle portion pointing distad, basal cell-spot at least vestigial, costal margin somewhat greyish at base.

Hindwing: median series of bars much broken, none of the bars contiguous, bar R^{3}—M^{1} several millimetres distant from base of M^{1}, not standing very far from the discal series, bar R^{2}—R^{3} much more distal than bar R^{1}—R^{2}, the discal interspace, therefore, not half the width between R^{2} and M^{1} as between C and R^{2}; discal bars much less arched than in C. latona, the posterior ones almost straight, the series not parallel to outer margin of wing, it being slightly curved basad from C—R^{3} and then running nearly straight to SM^{3}, which it reaches close to anal angle; postdiscal bars indistinct, represented by blackish, ill-defined, feebly curved lunules, interspace between them and the discal bars tawny outwardly, more yellow proximally; admarginal blackish brown line thin, but well-defined, not touching edge of wing, sometimes interrupted at veins.

=== Differences compared to Charaxes latona ===
Females are often confounded with the female of C. latona.

Forewing upperside: outer margin more concave than in C. latona; median bars SC^{5}—R^{2} less enlarged than in C. latona, somewhat more distal; discal uniform bars more distal than in C. latona and also much more distal than the discal bars of the underside, which show through, the upper ones more or less enlarged; postdisco-submarginal patches more triangular than in C. latona, closer to edge of wing, often fused with the black-brown margin; marginal line much thinner than in C. latona, very indistinctly defined, the pale tawny orange colour extending close to the fringe at the veins.

Hindwing upperside: median bars C—SC^{2} always (?), SC^{2}—R^{1} mostly present, bar R^{1}—R^{2} seldom distinctly marked, disc outside these bars often very pale; discal lunules shining through from below; there is often a very indistinct, band-like, dark shade from the inner edge of the upper postdisco-submarginal patches straight to anal angle, corresponding to the black postdiscal band of the underside, this shadowy band sometimes ending in a conspicuous blackish half-moon at anal angle; postdisco-submarginal patches closer to margin than in C. latona, the posterior ones always small, the middle and upper white submarginal dots seldom obliterated; admarginal line thin, but well-defined, broken up into slightly arched lunules, the upper ones heavier; upper tail spatulate, 7 mm long, second a very short and blunt tooth.

Underside: discal interspaces of both wings, the greater part of the postdiscal and submedian interspaces of the forewing ochre yellow, median interspace of both wings more or less brown; bars thinner than in C. latona.

Forewing: submedian bar M^{1}—M^{2} always considerably more distal than submedian bar M^{2}—(SM^{1}), and median bar R^{3}—M^{1} much more so than median bar M^{1}—M^{2}; discal uniform bars less deeply arched than in C. latona, more distal in position; postdisco-submarginal spots much shaded with white scales, consisting generally of a blackish proximal (postdiscal) dot or dash which is separated from a similar, but less obvious, spot by whitish scales; from the postdiscal dots extend basad fine, yellow, lines situated at the internervular folds R^{2}—SM^{2}, these lines sometimes very faint.

Hindwing: discal interspace very much narrowed between R^{2} and M^{1}, the median bars R^{2}—M^{1} not far from the discal series, especially bar R^{3}—M^{1}; discal bars uniform, the posterior ones very feebly arched, the series very slightly convex from SC^{2}—M^{1}, reaching SM^{2} much nearer tip of that vein than in C. latona; postdiscal bars slate-black, much less arched than in C. latona, the series almost straight.

== Subspecies ==
- Charaxes affinis affinis (Sulawesi, Togian)
- Charaxes affinis butongensis Tsukada, 1991 (Buton, Kabaena)
- Charaxes affinis spadix Tsukada, 1991 (Banggai)

== Biology ==
The larva on feeds on Manihot species and Persea americana.
