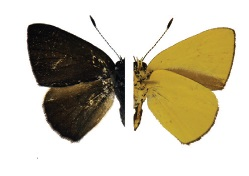
- Male
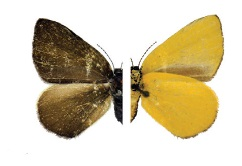
- Female

Scientific classification
- Domain: Eukaryota
- Kingdom: Animalia
- Phylum: Arthropoda
- Class: Insecta
- Order: Lepidoptera
- Family: Lycaenidae
- Genus: Philiris
- Species: P. hypoxantha

Binomial name
- Philiris hypoxantha (Röber, 1926)

Synonyms
- Candalides hypoxantha Röber, 1926

= Philiris hypoxantha =

Species of butterfly

Philiris hypoxantha is a species of butterfly in the Lycaenidae family. It is found in West Irian (Snow Mountains, Mount Goliath).
