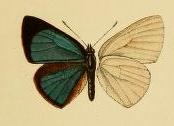

Scientific classification
- Kingdom: Animalia
- Phylum: Arthropoda
- Clade: Pancrustacea
- Class: Insecta
- Order: Lepidoptera
- Family: Lycaenidae
- Genus: Philiris
- Species: P. gloriosa

Binomial name
- Philiris gloriosa (Bethune-Baker, 1908)

Synonyms
- Candalides gloriosa Bethune-Baker, 1908

= Philiris gloriosa =

Species of butterfly

Philiris gloriosa is a species of butterfly of the family Lycaenidae. It is found in Papua New Guinea.

The species belongs to the diana species-group within the genus Philiris. Like other six members of the group, P. gloriosa is relatively large butterfly, with the hindwing underside lacking a black spot on the inner margin, and the male genitalia having long and asymmetric valvae.
