= Delias fruhstorferi =

- In Seitz

Scientific classification
- Kingdom: Animalia
- Phylum: Arthropoda
- Clade: Pancrustacea
- Class: Insecta
- Order: Lepidoptera
- Family: Pieridae
- Genus: Delias
- Species: D. fruhstorferi

Binomial name
- Delias fruhstorferi (Honrath, 1892)

Synonyms
- Pieris fruhstorferi Honrath, 1892

Species of butterfly

Delias fruhstorferi is a butterfly in the family Pieridae. It was described by Eduard Honrath in 1892. It is found in the Indomalayan realm, where it has only been recorded from Java.

== Description ==
Similar to Delias momea and Delias nysa. Male:Upperside with brownish-black costal border and distal area. Hind wing with black marginal vein-spots.Underside with fuscous-brown ground colour. Fore wing with white proximal half. Female: Upperside of fore wing with white proximal half as in D. momea but outer edge more indented on veins 2 and 3. A white postcellular bar of three spots.Base of fore wing and basal area of hind wing dusted with black.

== Subspecies ==
- Delias fruhstorferi fruhstorferi (eastern Java)
- Delias fruhstorferi takakoae Sakuma & Morita, 1995 (Mt. Wilis, eastern Java)

== Etymology ==
The name honours Hans Fruhstorfer.
