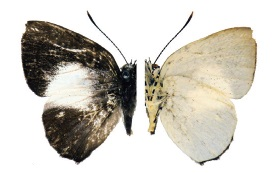

Scientific classification
- Kingdom: Animalia
- Phylum: Arthropoda
- Clade: Pancrustacea
- Class: Insecta
- Order: Lepidoptera
- Family: Lycaenidae
- Genus: Philiris
- Species: P. albiplaga

Binomial name
- Philiris albiplaga (Joicey & Talbot, 1916)

Synonyms
- Candalides albiplaga Joicey & Talbot, 1916

= Philiris albiplaga =

Species of butterfly

Philiris albiplaga is a species of butterfly of the family Lycaenidae. It is found on the Schouten Islands (Biak and Mefor).

== Characteristics ==
Philiris albiplaga is recognized for its striking coloration and patterns, typical of the Lycaeninae subfamily. The species is notable for its rarity and is classified as extremely rare within its habitat

== Description ==
Original.

Candalides albiplaga, sp. nov. (Plate ITI, fig. 6.) female. Upperside blackish-brown. ore-wing with a large white patch extending along inner margin from near tornus to near base, narrowing slightly to vein 2 and then slightly outcurved and reaching just above 3; it extends to the base of cellule 2 and does not enter the cell. Fringe whitish at outer angle. Hind-wing with outer costal area white and extending as a spot in the angle of 6 and 7. Fringe white. Underside white. Fore-wing narrowly edged with black from apex to vein 2, and similarly the hind-wing from vein 4 to first submedian. Head, thorax, and abdomen blackish-brown above, white below. Length of fore-wing: 16 mm. A single specimen only obtained.
