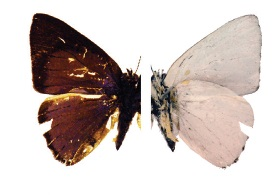

Scientific classification
- Domain: Eukaryota
- Kingdom: Animalia
- Phylum: Arthropoda
- Class: Insecta
- Order: Lepidoptera
- Family: Lycaenidae
- Genus: Philiris
- Species: P. marginata

Binomial name
- Philiris marginata (Grose-Smith, 1894)

Synonyms
- Holochila marginata Grose-Smith, 1894

= Philiris marginata =

Species of butterfly

Philiris marginata is a species of butterfly of the family Lycaenidae. It is found in Yos Sudarso Bay in Western New Guinea.
