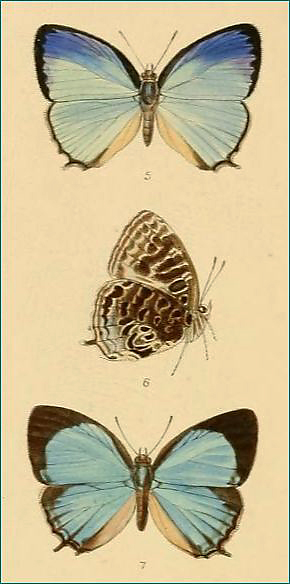
- Arhopala helianthes, male, female, New Guinea, from original description.

Scientific classification
- Kingdom: Animalia
- Phylum: Arthropoda
- Clade: Pancrustacea
- Class: Insecta
- Order: Lepidoptera
- Family: Lycaenidae
- Genus: Arhopala
- Species: A. helianthes

Binomial name
- Arhopala helianthes Grose-Smith, 1902

= Arhopala helianthes =

Species of butterfly

Arhopala helianthes is a butterfly in the family Lycaenidae. It was described by Henley Grose-Smith in 1902. It is found in the Australasian realm, where it is endemic to New Guinea.

Male. Upperside. Resembles helius, Cram., but on the anterior wings the outer margins are more broadly black, especially at the apex; on the posterior margins the cilia are brownish-white instead of brown.Female upperside differs from the same sex of A. helius in the wings being rounder.
