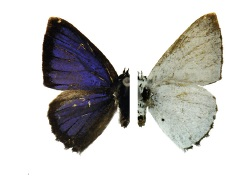

Scientific classification
- Domain: Eukaryota
- Kingdom: Animalia
- Phylum: Arthropoda
- Class: Insecta
- Order: Lepidoptera
- Family: Lycaenidae
- Genus: Philiris
- Species: P. satis

Binomial name
- Philiris satis Tite, 1963

= Philiris satis =

Species of butterfly

Philiris satis is a species of butterfly of the family Lycaenidae. It is found on Goodenough Island in the Solomon Sea.
