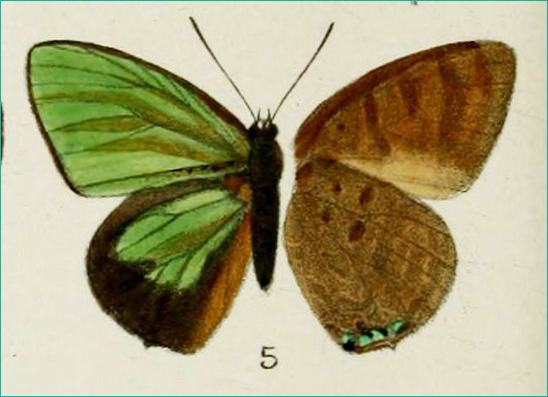
- Arhopala borneensis, male, from original description by Bethune-Baker in Druce, 1896.

Scientific classification
- Kingdom: Animalia
- Phylum: Arthropoda
- Clade: Pancrustacea
- Class: Insecta
- Order: Lepidoptera
- Family: Lycaenidae
- Genus: Arhopala
- Species: A. borneensis

Binomial name
- Arhopala borneensis Bethune-Baker, 1896

= Arhopala borneensis =

Species of butterfly

Arhopala borneensis, is a butterfly in the family Lycaenidae. It was described by George Thomas Bethune-Baker in 1896. It is found in the Indomalayan realm where it is endemic to Borneo.

Seitz - "boreensis B.-Bak. (149 d, e) is probably only an alpine form of Arhopala aurea, from the Kina Bala, with an entirely dull-marked under surface which in the Sumatran form: trogon Dist. [ now species Arhopala trogon (Distant, 1884) ] flying also in Malacca shows a beautiful violet reflection"
