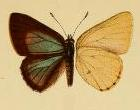

Scientific classification
- Domain: Eukaryota
- Kingdom: Animalia
- Phylum: Arthropoda
- Class: Insecta
- Order: Lepidoptera
- Family: Lycaenidae
- Genus: Philiris
- Species: P. agatha

Binomial name
- Philiris agatha (Grose-Smith, 1899)

Synonyms
- Holochila agatha Grose-Smith, 1899; Candalides aroa Bethune-Baker, 1908; Philiris aroa

= Philiris agatha =

Species of butterfly

Philiris agatha is a species of butterfly of the family Lycaenidae. It is endemic to Papua New Guinea.
