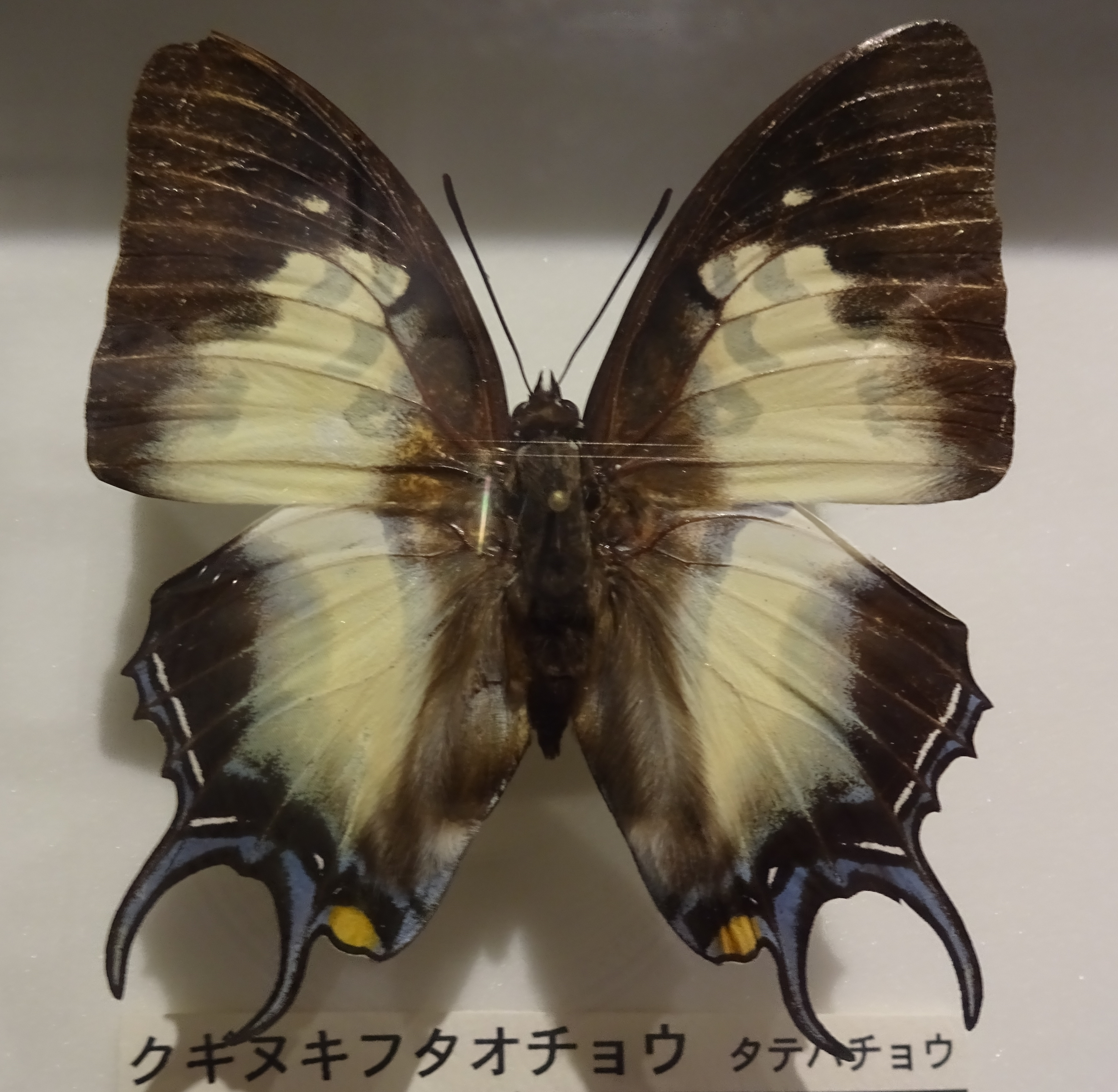

Scientific classification
- Kingdom: Animalia
- Phylum: Arthropoda
- Clade: Pancrustacea
- Class: Insecta
- Order: Lepidoptera
- Family: Nymphalidae
- Genus: Charaxes
- Species: C. dehanii

Binomial name
- Charaxes dehanii Westwood, 1850

Synonyms
- Polyura dehanii; Nymphalis dehanii Westwood, 1850; Charaxes kadenii C. & R. Felder, 1860; Charaxes kadenii var. sulthan Hagen, 1896; Charaxes kadenii var. sumatrana Hagen, 1896

= Polyura dehanii =

Species of butterfly

Charaxes (Polyura) dehanii is a butterfly in the family Nymphalidae. It was described by John Obadiah Westwood in 1850. It is found in the Indomalayan realm in Java (C. d. dehanii) and Sumatra (C. d. sulthan (Hagen, 1896)).

== Description ==
E. dehaani, more popular by the name of kadeni and as "circular butterfly” (Zirkelsehmetterling), numbers among the oriental butterflies most in demand since Wallace's report in his Malayan Archipelago. But since 1861 till my expedition to Java in 1891/94, only one or two good specimens have come to Europe. Only during my stay at Sukabumi, in 1892, Javanese hunters succeeded in capturing a number of males.In 1896, the collector Prillwitz succeeded in taking also the female. dehaani is beneath remarkable for a silvery white basal area exhibiting on the forewings a series of black streaks and on the hindwings a peculiar triangular area densely dotted with black, traces of which are also noticed in E. cognatus. Hindwings furthermore distinguished by a black, Y-shaped band and three reddish-brown crescents being proximally dusted with violet and extending within the tails, between the anterior median and the anal angle, in the shape of a demi-bow. — dehaani Dbl. (= kadeni Fldr.) (137 a) with a blackened cell of the forewing, a broad black distal margin of the hind¬ wings and a relatively narrow and dark blue crescentiform hue at the base of the tails likewise dusted with blue. Female considerably larger than the male with a double yellow transcellular spot and a narrower black bordering round the forewings. Hindwings likewise more extensively scaled in yellowish, the predominant yellow part sends forth a long tooth, between the anterior and middle median, towards the origin of the anterior tail. The tails are broader and therefore also more extensively covered with blue. Beneath like the males but the three crescents dusted harmoniously with purple and whitish violet and embedded in the submarginal zone in a fine curve, are much narrower. Habitat exclusively the Megamendong, the northern ridge of the Gede Volcano, 1480 m, being easily reached from Buitenzorg. Wallace got there his specimen which a Javanese boy had surprised and captured in an undamaged condition on its feeding on the moisture from a pool near the road. The occurrence of the butterfly is rather limited there, and if one day larger tea or coffee plantations or other cultivations should expand there, the noble butterfly will be destined to die out. dehaani is extremely constant, and judging from the 15 males of my collection, only the colour of the cell of the forewing varies, being quite black in the rarest cases, but oftener lightened in its apical part being strewn with bluish-green scales. Only 2 females are known to me: the type in my collection and a specimen in the Tring Museum. -— sulthan Hag. of a smaller shape than kadeni, one of the few forms being exclusively common to Java and Sumatra, exhibits remarkably lighter colours than the Javanese ally, while otherwise the Sumatrans appear not only larger, but also darker than the Javanese vicarious types. Cell of the forewing nearly throughout light yellowish, quite thinly scaled in green. Preapical spot only punctiform. Black distal margin narrower, the blue of the hindwings much lighter, more extensive. The orange anal spot of the hindwings more distinct. Under surface with finer black stripes of the forewings. The magnificent tripartite submedian bow of the hindwings, the elegant appearance of which reminds us of the crescents of Papilio paris and arcturus group, is about one third narrower. Sumatra from the Gaju-Districts and the Battak-Plateau; I obtained it also from the Padang Boven country (West Sumatra). A female is in the collection of the British Museum, differing from the male by the considerably larger orange spot and a somewhat lighter blue of the upper surface of the hindwings.

kaeni 137a

== Subspecies ==
- C. d. dehanii (Java)
- C. d. sulthan (Hagen, 1896) (Sumatra)
