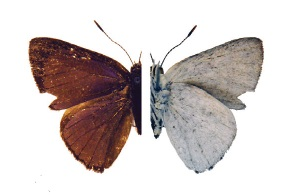

Scientific classification
- Domain: Eukaryota
- Kingdom: Animalia
- Phylum: Arthropoda
- Class: Insecta
- Order: Lepidoptera
- Family: Lycaenidae
- Genus: Philiris
- Species: P. vicina

Binomial name
- Philiris vicina (Grose-Smith, 1898)

Synonyms
- Holochila vicina Grose-Smith, 1898

= Philiris vicina =

Species of butterfly

Philiris vicina is a species of butterfly of the family Lycaenidae. It is found from West Irian to New Guinea.
