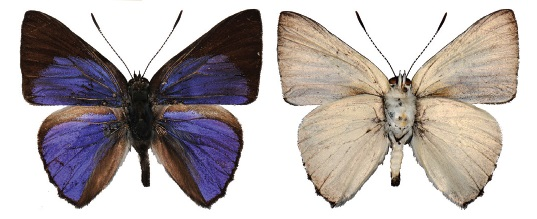

Scientific classification
- Domain: Eukaryota
- Kingdom: Animalia
- Phylum: Arthropoda
- Class: Insecta
- Order: Lepidoptera
- Family: Lycaenidae
- Genus: Philiris
- Species: P. bubalisatina

Binomial name
- Philiris bubalisatina Müller, 2014

= Philiris bubalisatina =

Species of butterfly

Philiris bubalisatina is a species of butterfly of the family Lycaenidae. It is found in Papua New Guinea (West Sepik and Western Highlands provinces).

The length of the forewings is about 20 mm. The ground colour of the forewings is black, with a large area of shining purple lilac extending from the base to near the end of the cell and the postmedian area. The underside is uniformly glossy pale buff cream, the apical area suffused with dark scales. The hindwings are shining purple blue and bluish white nearest to the costa.

== Etymology ==
The species name is a combination of the Latin word bubalinus (referring to the colour buff, reflecting the unusual pale yellowish-brown hue to the underside) and satina (referring to the satin lustre to the underside).
