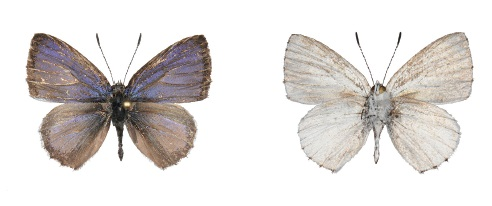

Scientific classification
- Domain: Eukaryota
- Kingdom: Animalia
- Phylum: Arthropoda
- Class: Insecta
- Order: Lepidoptera
- Family: Lycaenidae
- Genus: Philiris
- Species: P. hindenburgensis

Binomial name
- Philiris hindenburgensis Müller, 2014

= Philiris hindenburgensis =

Species of butterfly

Philiris hindenburgensis is a species of butterfly of the family Lycaenidae. It is found in Western Province of Papua New Guinea.

The length of the forewings is about 15.5 mm. The ground colour of the forewings is dull frosty purple blue, the termen broadly dark brown black. The hindwings are dull frosty purple blue, the costa and inner margin very broadly dark brown.

== Etymology ==
The species name refers to the Hindenburg Wall, the type locality.
