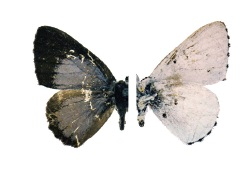

Scientific classification
- Kingdom: Animalia
- Phylum: Arthropoda
- Class: Insecta
- Order: Lepidoptera
- Family: Lycaenidae
- Genus: Philiris
- Species: P. angabunga

Binomial name
- Philiris angabunga (Bethune-Baker, 1908)

Synonyms
- Candalides angabunga Bethune-Baker, 1908

= Philiris angabunga =

Species of butterfly

Philiris angabunga is a species of butterfly of the family Lycaenidae. It is found in Papua New Guinea.
