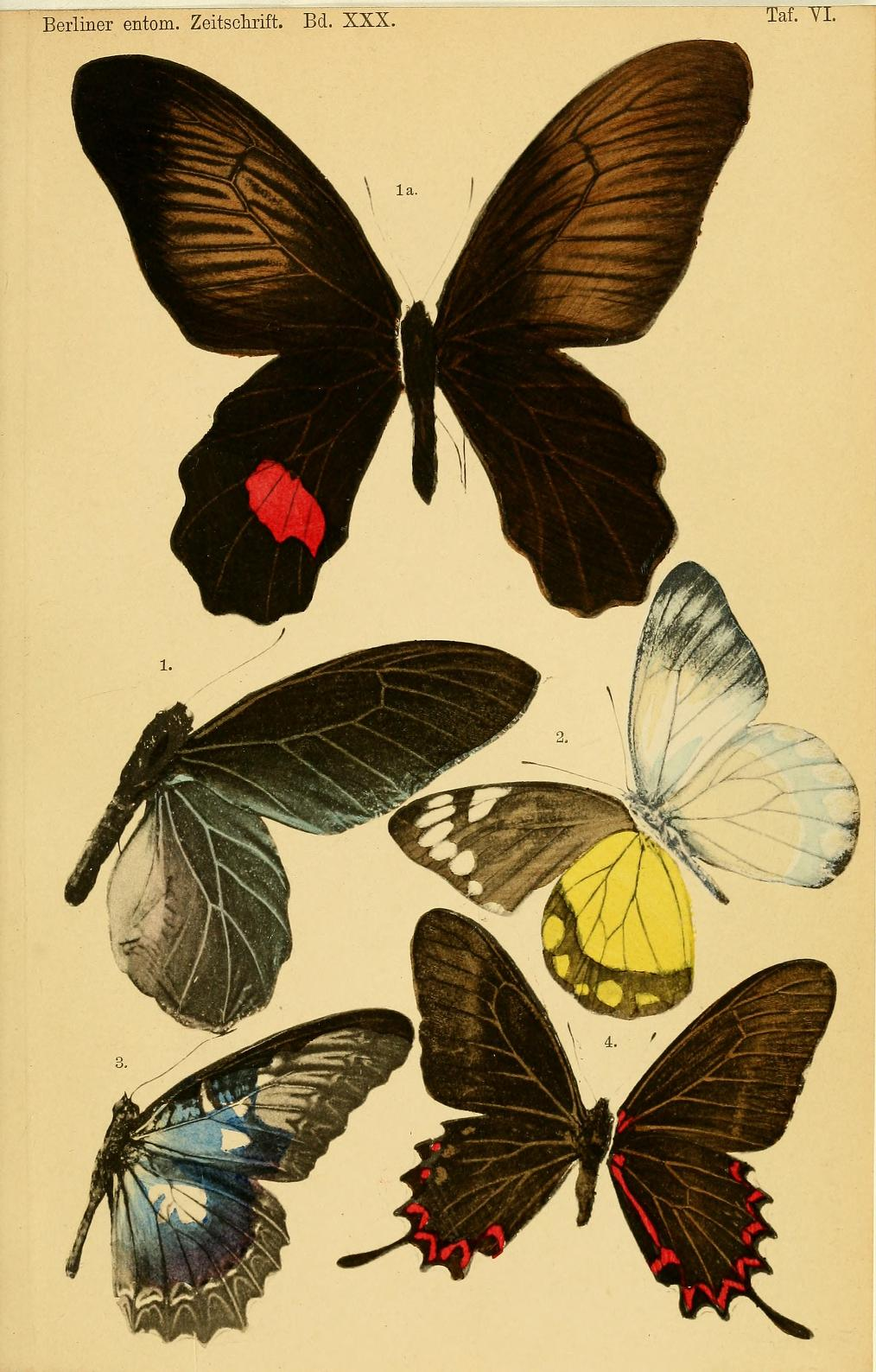
- Delias kuehni in Berliner entomologische Zeitschrift (1865)

Scientific classification
- Kingdom: Animalia
- Phylum: Arthropoda
- Class: Insecta
- Order: Lepidoptera
- Family: Pieridae
- Genus: Delias
- Species: D. kuhni

Binomial name
- Delias kuhni Honrath, 1887

Synonyms
- Delias kuehni; Delias prinsi Martin, [1913]

= Delias kuhni =

Species of insect

Delias kuhni, Kuehn's jezebel, is a butterfly in the family Pieridae. It was described by Eduard Honrath in 1887. It is found in the Australasian realm.

It approximates to themis, with the forewing entirely black beneath. Hindwing with three light yellow submarginal spots. — sulana Stgr. is a good local form, with larger white spots on the forewing and six yellow and yellow-grey submarginal patches on the hindwing beneath.

== Subspecies ==
- D. k. kuhni (Banggai, Peleng)
- D. k. prinsi Martin, [1913] (Central Sulawesi)
- D. k. sulana Staudinger, 1895 (Mangole, Taliabu)
- D. k. yoshimiae Yagishita, 1989 (Buru)
