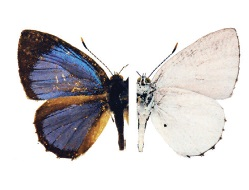
- Male
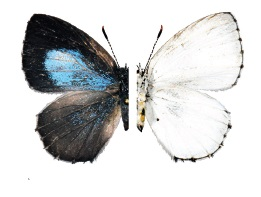
- Female

Scientific classification
- Domain: Eukaryota
- Kingdom: Animalia
- Phylum: Arthropoda
- Class: Insecta
- Order: Lepidoptera
- Family: Lycaenidae
- Genus: Philiris
- Species: P. intensa

Binomial name
- Philiris intensa (Butler, 1876)

Synonyms
- Holochila intensa Butler, 1876; Holochila regina Butler, 1882; Holochila butleri Grose-Smith & Kirby, 1897

= Philiris intensa =

Species of butterfly

Philiris intensa is a species of butterfly of the family Lycaenidae. It is found on the Aru Islands, from West Irian to Papua, the Louisiade Archipelago, the Trobriand Archipelago, the Bismarck Archipelago, the Moluccas and Buru.

== Subspecies ==
- Philiris intensa intensa (Aru, from West Irian to Papua, the Louisiades, Trobriand, Bismarck Archipelago)
- Philiris intensa birou Wind & Clench, 1947 (New Guinea: Morobe district)
- Philiris intensa butleri (Grose-Smith & Kirby, 1897) (Moluccas: Halmaheira, Batchian, Gilolo)
- Philiris intensa ilioides Cassidy, 2003 (Buru)
