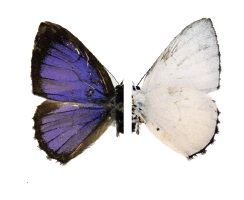

Scientific classification
- Domain: Eukaryota
- Kingdom: Animalia
- Phylum: Arthropoda
- Class: Insecta
- Order: Lepidoptera
- Family: Lycaenidae
- Genus: Philiris
- Species: P. oreas

Binomial name
- Philiris oreas Tite, 1963

= Philiris oreas =

Species of butterfly

Philiris oreas is a species of butterfly of the family Lycaenidae. It is found in Western New Guinea (Snow Mountains, Mount Goliath) and possibly on Biak.
