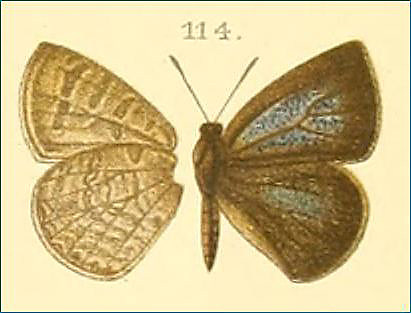

Scientific classification
- Kingdom: Animalia
- Phylum: Arthropoda
- Class: Insecta
- Order: Lepidoptera
- Family: Lycaenidae
- Subfamily: Theclinae
- Tribe: Arhopalini
- Genus: Arhopala
- Species: A. weelii

Binomial name
- Arhopala weelii Piepers & Snellen, 1918

Synonyms
- Panchala weelii

= Arhopala weelii =

Species of butterfly

Arhopala weelii is a butterfly in the family Lycaenidae. It was discovered by Murinus Cornelis Piepers and Pieter Cornelius Tobias Snellen in 1918. It is found in Java.

== Description ==
The upperside of this species is powdery blue in color, with a border of 5 millimeters. The wings are rounded. The underside of both sexes is faint grey. The only difference between the sexes is that the female is considerably smaller.
