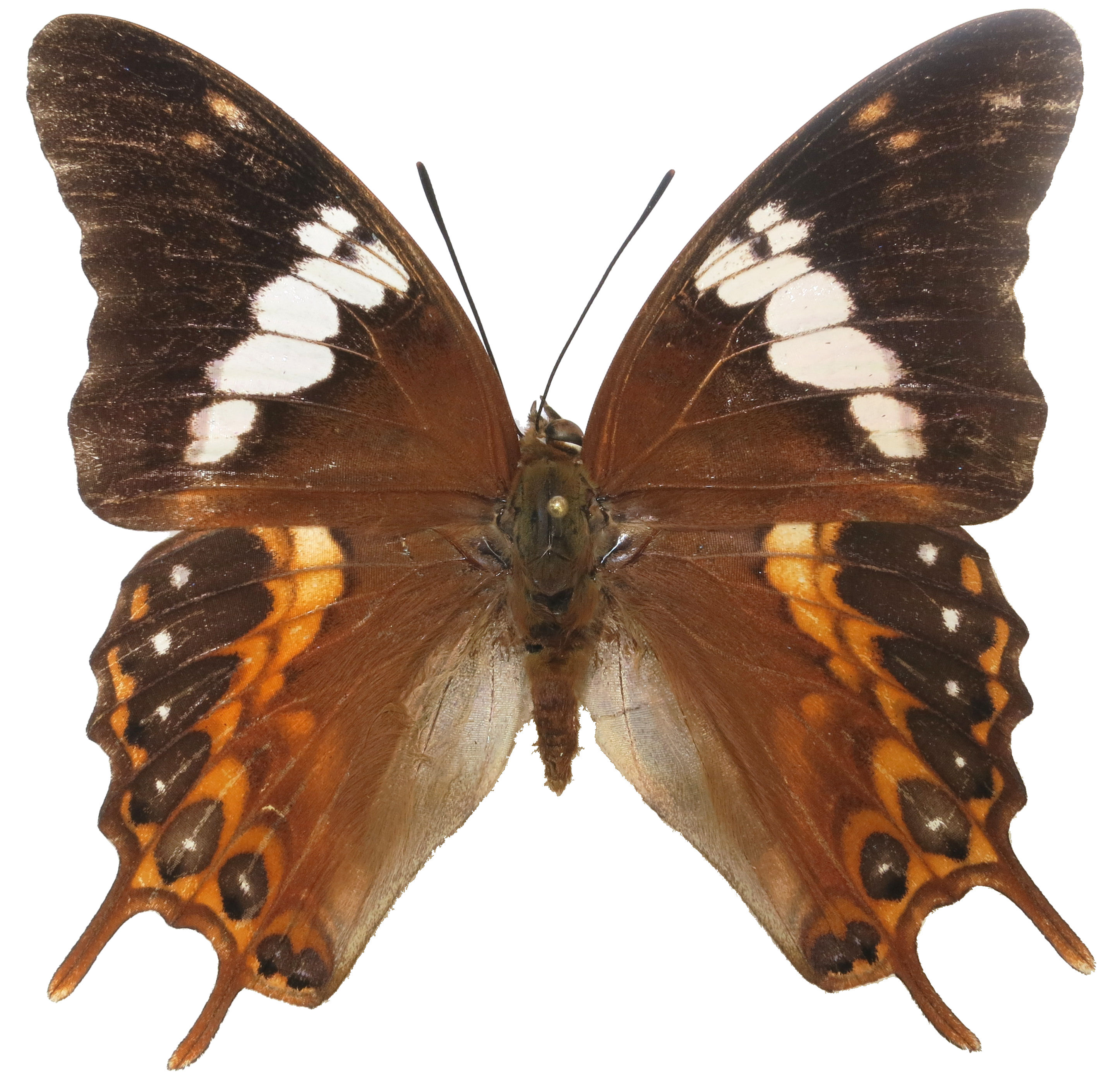
- Charaxes ocellatus male - Sumba island

Scientific classification
- Kingdom: Animalia
- Phylum: Arthropoda
- Clade: Pancrustacea
- Class: Insecta
- Order: Lepidoptera
- Family: Nymphalidae
- Genus: Charaxes
- Species: C. ocellatus

Binomial name
- Charaxes ocellatus Fruhstorfer, 1896

Synonyms
- Charaxes sumbanus Rothschild, 1896; Charaxes sumbanus sambavanus Rothschild, 1896

= Charaxes ocellatus =

Species of butterfly

Charaxes ocellatus is a butterfly belonging to the family Nymphalidae. It was first described by Hans Fruhstorfer in 1896. This species is endemic to the Lesser Sunda Islands in the Australasian realm, near the Wallace line.

Charaxes ocellatus is characterized by its large size, the concave outer edge of the forewing and two tails present on the hindwings. The upper sides of the wings are light brown in the basal portion and dark in the distal portion. The forewings are separated by a white bar that extends from the middle of the costal margin to the inner edge near the anal angle. The hindwings are also light brown and decorated with a sub-marginal line of dark brown ocelli.

== Technical description ==
Both males and females have a creamy white underside, a tawny body, and a somewhat olivaceous thorax. Females are similar to males, but are somewhat larger. The butterfly has a slightly darker forewing in the basal half and a little longer tail. The forewing length is 38–40 mm in males and 44–50 mm in females.

General description of wings: The wings of C. ocellatus are chestnut-tawny, with the forewing being darker than the hindwing. The outer region of the forewing and postdisco-submarginal patches of the hindwing are black. The forewing is falcate and crossed by an oblique discal band of pure white patches. The band does not reach SM2 and is widest at the front. The band is bordered proximally by median bars R2-SM2 and bar D, with median bars SC2-R2 within the band. Bars R1-M2 are arched, and patch M2-SM2 is much smaller than the one before it. One or two whitish or pinkish buff postdiscal spots can be found between SC4 and R1, about halfway between the band and apex. The second spot is mostly absent, and sometimes both are difficult to see. The internervular folds have buffish longitudinal lines at the margin, and the fringe is white except at veins.

Forewing: On the forewing, Cell-bar 4 touches M closer to M2 than M1. Cell-bar 4’s shorter costal portion is curved at right angles to the longer and obliquely placed hinder portion. Median bars M2-SM2 are oblique, reaching SM2 8 mm from the end of the wing, hence the median interspace considerably widens behind the white band and is posteriorly bordered by the discal bars. As the series of bars is almost parallel to the margin, it recedes costad more and more from the band. The space between the band and the margin is pale drab. Discal bars are outwardly bordered with creamy scaling which form half-moon shapes on the wing. Postdiscal bars are represented by variably sized patches. Patches M1-SM2 are black and triangular. The other patches are chocolate-colored. The submedian patches are fused together, but are generally incised externally upon (SM1). Patches R2-M1 and SC5-R1 are much smaller. Patches R1-R2 bear whitish, triangular dots or gray lunules, except for the last patch, which is bordered externally with a bluish gray, sometimes M-shaped, patch. Admarginal interspaces are more or less gray.

Hindwing: The median series of bars on the hindwing are obliquely curved from C to R3 then again from R3 to (SM1), forming an angle upon R2. Bars M2-SM2 form an acute angle upon (SM1), pointing in the basal direction, often reaching the pitch which is formed by the respective submedian bars. Basal and subbasal costal bars are present. A longitudinal line upon fold SM2-SM3 is present, as seen in Charaxes orilus. SM2 is mostly chocolate-colored. Discal interspaces are filled by a white band, which is widely separated from the discal lunules by well-defined continuously colored patches. The discal and postdiscal bars are cream-colored and luniform, with the former not prominent and separated from the thicker, chestnut-colored postdiscal bars. Bars C-SC2 and R1-R2 are always patch-like, while bar R3-M1 and bar SC2-R1 are thin. Submarginal white dots are present, but spot R3-M1 can be inconspicuous, owing to the interspace between the black and blue submarginal dot and cream-colored postdiscal bar. Admarginal interspaces are small and cream-buffed. The admarginal line is drab-colored, and the edge of the wing is greyish between veins. Both tails are drab-colored overall with a cream-colored tip. Both tails are somewhat spatulate. The upper tail averages a length of nine to nine and a half millimeters long. The lower tail is slightly curved toward the costal region. It is shorter than the upper tail and is often around seven millimeters long.

Underside: The undersides of the wings are fawn-colored, with chestnut-colored basal to median bars. Each branch has a heavy basal cell spot.

== Subspecies ==
- C. o. ocellatus (Lombok)
- C. o. sumbanus Rothschild, 1896 (Sumba)
- C. o. sambavanus Rothschild, 1896 (Sumbawa)
- C. o. florensis Rothschild, 1900 (Flores)
- C. o. straatmani Nishiyama & Ohtani, 1981 (Alor)

== Discovery and naming ==
This insect was first discovered by W. Doherty in February 1896 on the Indonesian islands of Sumbawa and Sumba. The butterfly was also found and described on Lombok by H. Fruhstorfer shortly afterward. The name ocellatus has two or three days' priority over that of sumbanus, and hence must be employed to designate the species.
