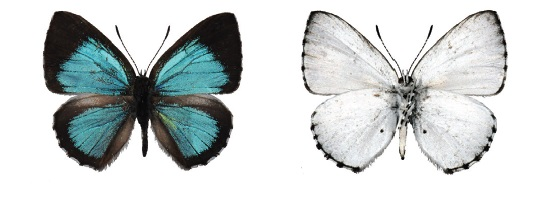
- Male
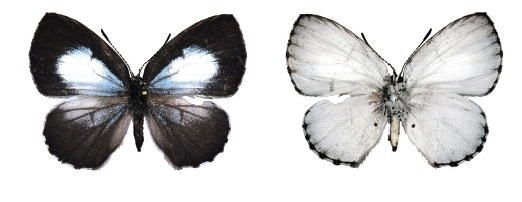
- Female

Scientific classification
- Domain: Eukaryota
- Kingdom: Animalia
- Phylum: Arthropoda
- Class: Insecta
- Order: Lepidoptera
- Family: Lycaenidae
- Genus: Philiris
- Species: P. radicala

Binomial name
- Philiris radicala Müller, 2014

= Philiris radicala =

Species of butterfly

Philiris radicala is a species of butterfly of the family Lycaenidae. It is found in Western Province, Papua New Guinea.

The length of the forewings is about 17 mm. The ground colour of the forewings is bright shining turquoise, the costa and termen broadly black. The hindwings are bright shining turquoise, the termen broadly black.

== Etymology ==
The species name refers to the extraordinary colouration of the male upperside and overall divergent morphology of this species and is derived from radicala.
