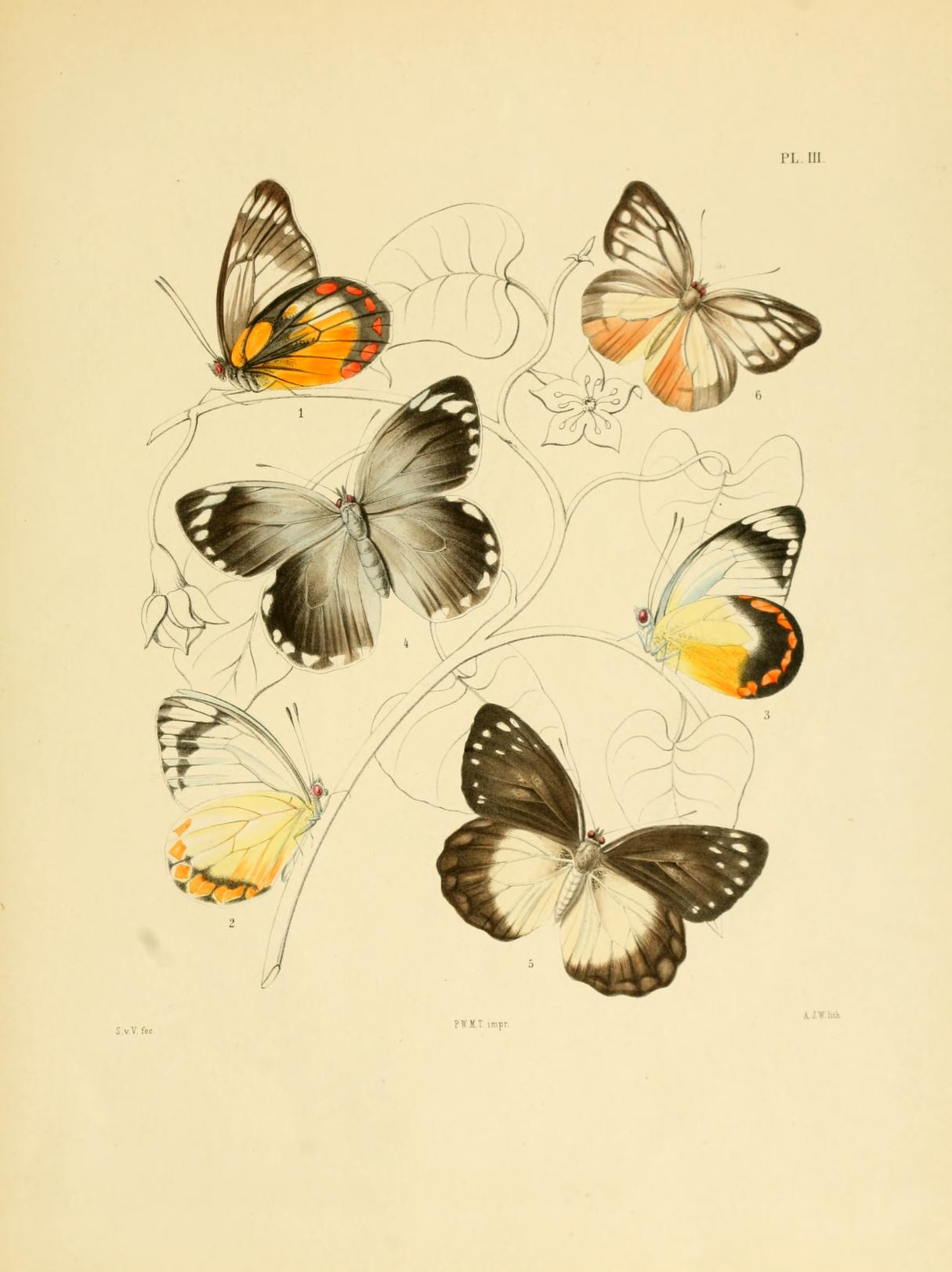
- In Vollenhoven's Essai d'une faune entomologique de l'archipel Indonéerlandais
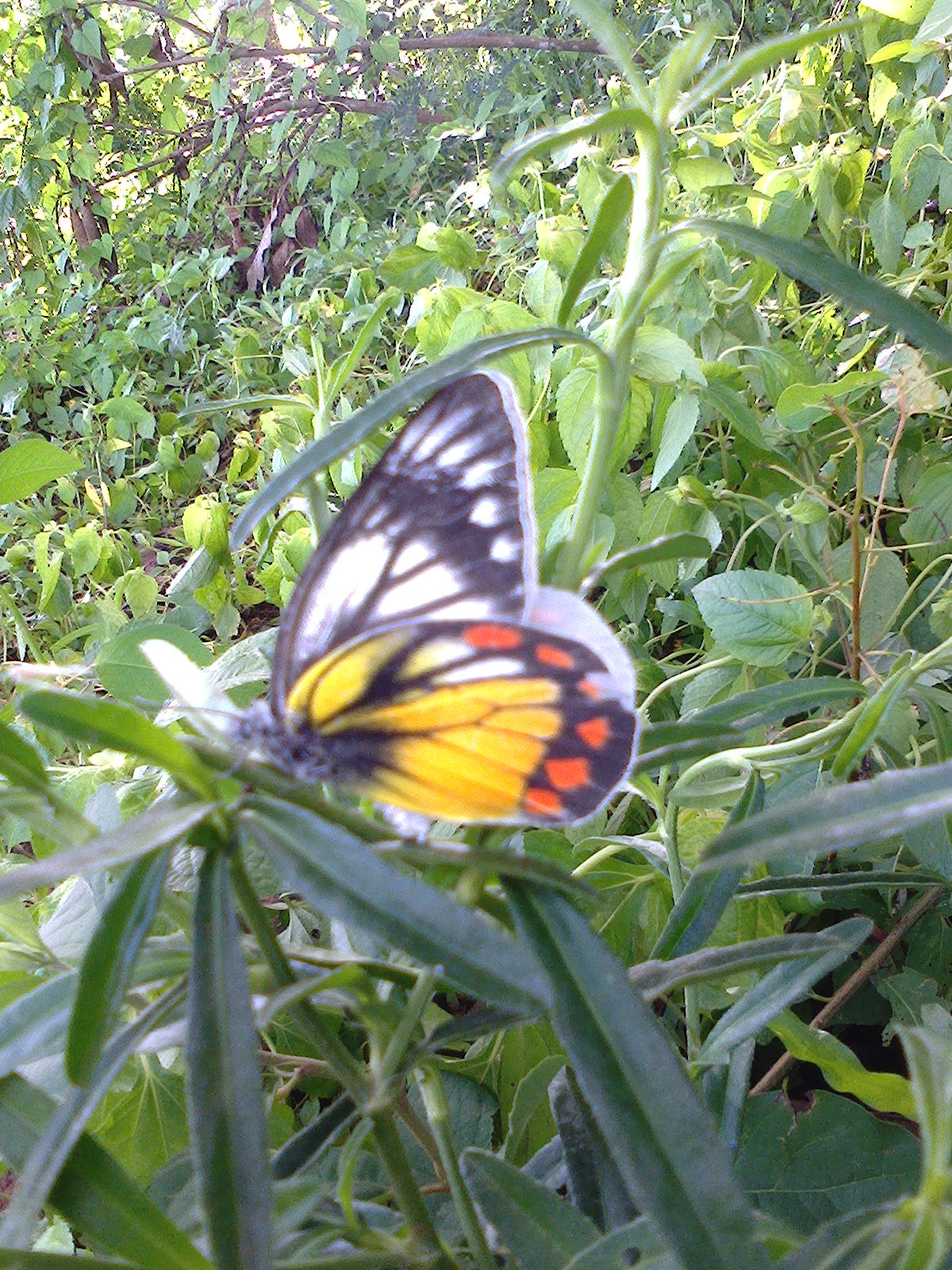
- D. r. rosenbergii, Ombulodata, North Gorontalo

Scientific classification
- Kingdom: Animalia
- Phylum: Arthropoda
- Class: Insecta
- Order: Lepidoptera
- Family: Pieridae
- Genus: Delias
- Species: D. rosenbergii

Binomial name
- Delias rosenbergii (Vollenhoven, 1865)

Synonyms
- Pieris rosenbergii Vollenhoven, 1865; Delias rosenbergi; Delias rosenbergii var. catamelas Staudinger, 1891; Delias lorquini C. & R. Felder, [1865]; Delias chrysoleuca Mitis, 1893

= Delias rosenbergii =

Species of butterfly

Delias rosenbergii, Rosenberg's painted Jezebel, is a butterfly in the family Pieridae. It was described by Samuel Constantinus Snellen van Vollenhoven in 1865. It is found on the Wallace line. The name honours William Frederick Henry Rosenberg.

== Description ==
D. rosenbergi Voll. (= chrysoleuca Mitis) (52 a) is the Celebes representative of the hyparete-group, a stately species, above in the female almost entirely suffused with black-grey. — In the north of the island occurs lorquini Fldr. (= catamelas Stgr.) (52 b), where the species ascends from the sea-coast to 3000 ft. The black bands on the underside of both wings are broader, the cell-region with more extended black scaling.The wingspan is about 70–75 mm.

== Subspecies ==
- D. r. rosenbergi (northern Sulawesi)
- D. r. lorquini C. & R. Felder, [1865] (Menado)
- D. r. chrysoleuca Mitis, 1893 (southern Sulawesi)
- D. r. salayerana Rothschild, 1915 (Selajar)
- D. r. munaensis Nakano, 1988 (Muna, Buton)

== Biology ==
In South Celebes rosenbergi flies all the year round, in large numbers in March and April at the end of the heaviest rainy season. The larva does not differ from that of despoliata from Sumatra, except that it is larger, dark yellow with light yellow and white hairs, and lives on Loranthus, which is parasitical on mango trees. The butterflies first appear very early in the day about 6 or half past 6 o’clock, and then again late in the evening (Martin)

== Taxonomy ==
rosenbergi is a member of the hyparete species group.
