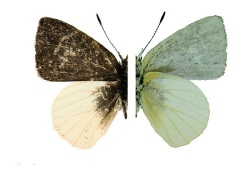

Scientific classification
- Kingdom: Animalia
- Phylum: Arthropoda
- Class: Insecta
- Order: Lepidoptera
- Family: Lycaenidae
- Genus: Philiris
- Species: P. hemileuca

Binomial name
- Philiris hemileuca (Jordan, 1930)

Synonyms
- Candalides hemileuca Jordan, 1930

= Philiris hemileuca =

Species of butterfly

Philiris hemileuca is a species of butterfly of the family Lycaenidae. It is found in the Herzog Mountains of New Guinea.
