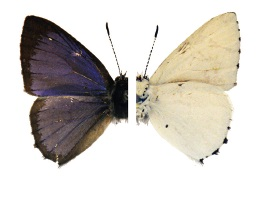

Scientific classification
- Domain: Eukaryota
- Kingdom: Animalia
- Phylum: Arthropoda
- Class: Insecta
- Order: Lepidoptera
- Family: Lycaenidae
- Genus: Philiris
- Species: P. albihumerata

Binomial name
- Philiris albihumerata Tite, 1963

= Philiris albihumerata =

Species of butterfly

Philiris albihumerata is a species of butterfly of the family Lycaenidae. It is found in north-western West Irian (Snow Mountains).
