= Philiris unipunctata =

Scientific classification
- Domain: Eukaryota
- Kingdom: Animalia
- Phylum: Arthropoda
- Class: Insecta
- Order: Lepidoptera
- Family: Lycaenidae
- Genus: Philiris
- Species: P. unipunctata

Binomial name
- Philiris unipunctata (Bethune-Baker, 1908)

Synonyms
- Candalides unipunctata Bethune-Baker, 1908

Species of butterfly

Philiris unipunctata is a species of butterfly of the family Lycaenidae. It is found in from West Irian to Papua New Guinea.
