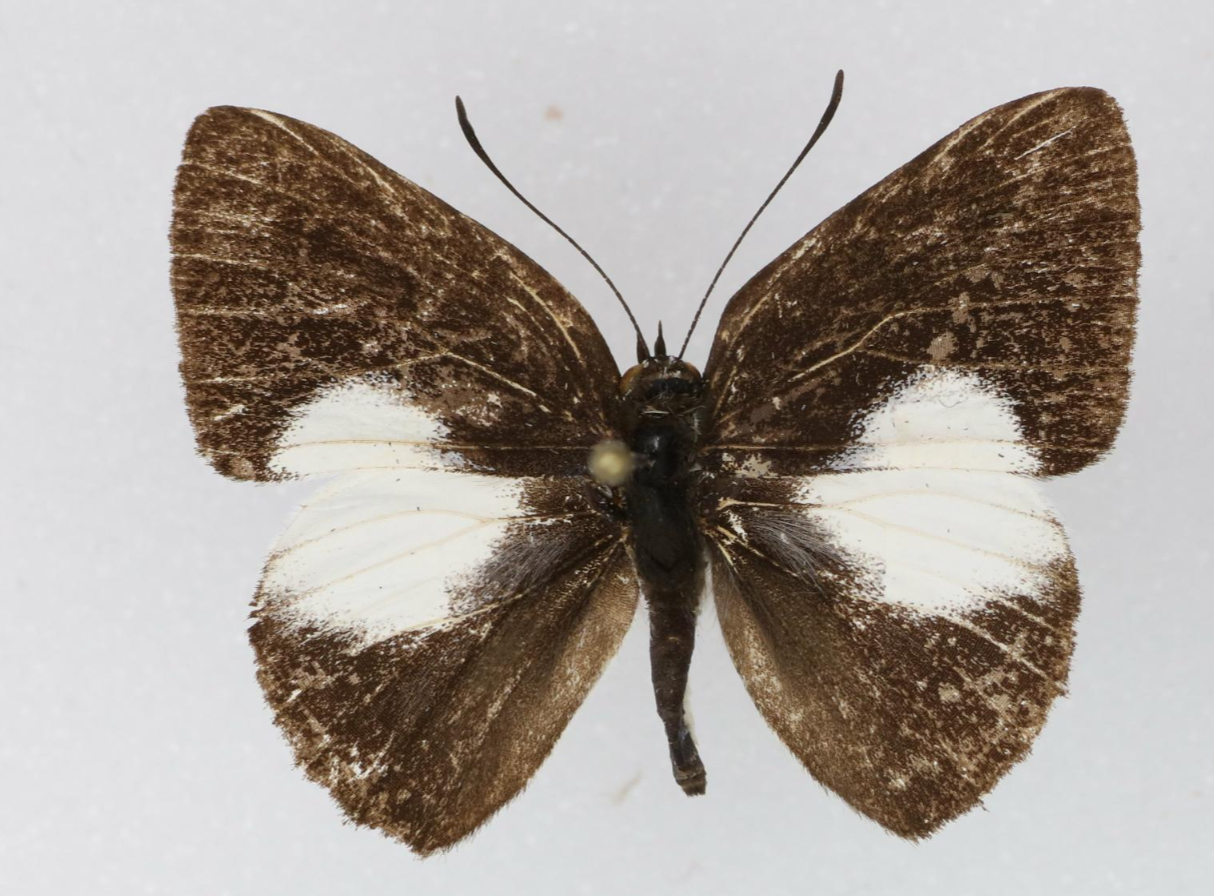

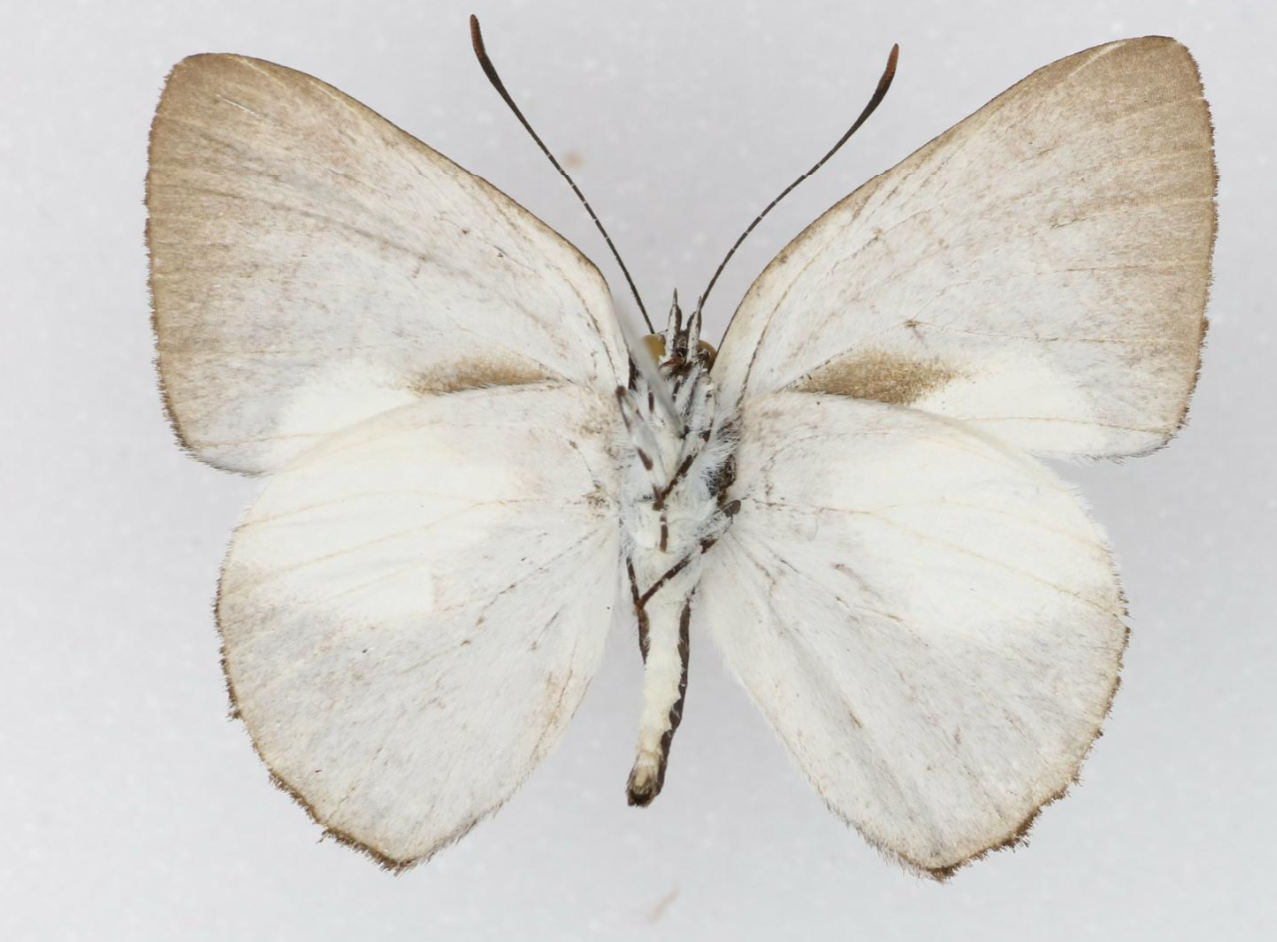

Scientific classification
- Kingdom: Animalia
- Phylum: Arthropoda
- Class: Insecta
- Order: Lepidoptera
- Family: Lycaenidae
- Genus: Philiris
- Species: P. petriei

Binomial name
- Philiris petriei Müller, 2014

= Philiris petriei =

Species of butterfly

Philiris petriei is a species of butterfly of the family Lycaenidae. It is found on New Britain in Papua New Guinea.

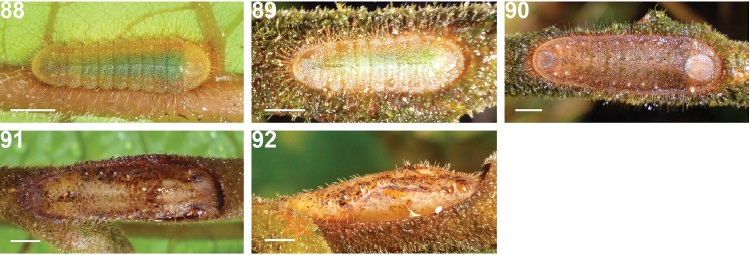
Larva and pupa

The length of the forewings is about 17.5 mm. The ground colour of the forewings is black, with a restricted triangular area of white in the median and postmedian area and a white area suffused with light grey narrowly towards the base. The underside is uniformly white, with apical area and termen broadly suffused with brown. The hindwings are black, the apical area white and extending along the costa to near the base and to the middle. There seem to be two generations per year with adults on wing in April and May and again in November and December.

The larvae feed on Litsea species.

== Etymology ==
The species is named in honour of Edward A. Petrie.
