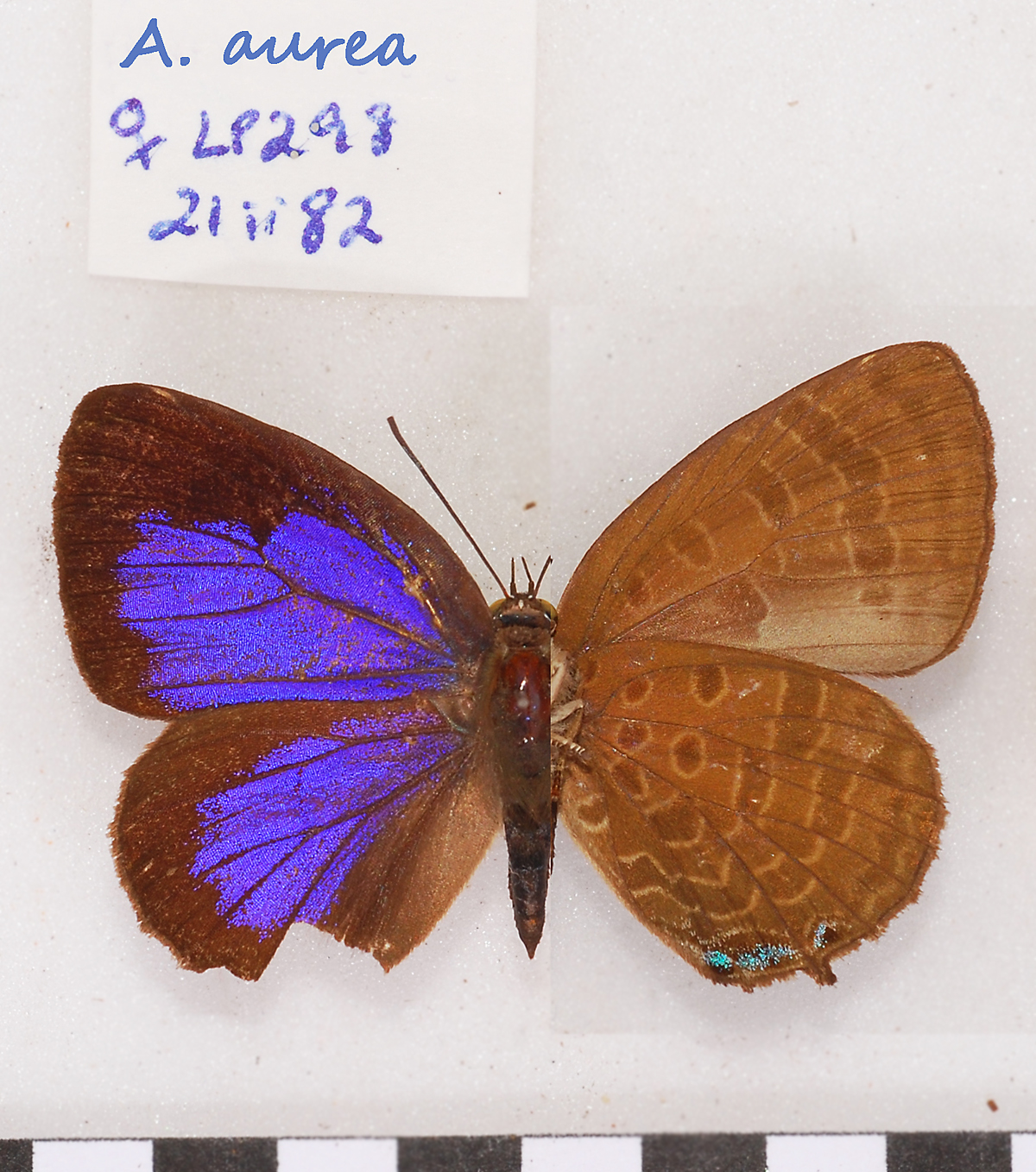

Scientific classification
- Kingdom: Animalia
- Phylum: Arthropoda
- Clade: Pancrustacea
- Class: Insecta
- Order: Lepidoptera
- Family: Lycaenidae
- Genus: Arhopala
- Species: A. aurea

Binomial name
- Arhopala aurea (Hewitson, 1862)

Synonyms
- Amblypodia aurea Hewitson, 1862

= Arhopala aurea =

Species of butterfly

Arhopala aurea is a species of butterfly belonging to the lycaenid family described by William Chapman Hewitson in 1862. It is found in Southeast Asia (Peninsular Malaya, Singapore and Sumatra).

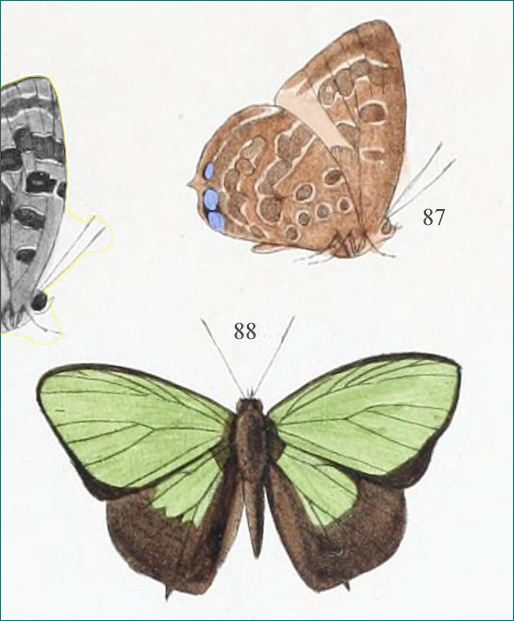
male figured in Hewitson, 1862 Specimen of a Catalogue of Lycaenidae in the British Museum

== Description ==
Male of a very bright greenish golden colour, on the hindwing with a sharply defined black marginal band extending to the centre of the wing, whereas the forewing only exhibits at the anal angle slight traces of the marginal black which attains a width of hardly 1 mm. The marking beneath deviates from the forms of eumolphus by the narrower, more regularly shaped postmedian band of both wings.
