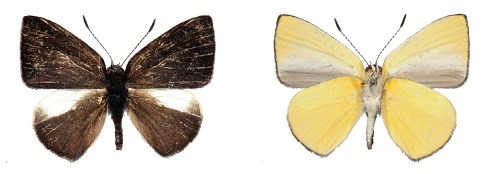

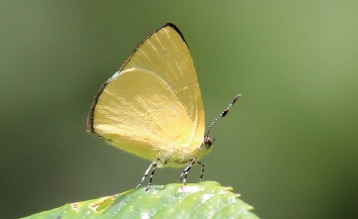

Scientific classification
- Domain: Eukaryota
- Kingdom: Animalia
- Phylum: Arthropoda
- Class: Insecta
- Order: Lepidoptera
- Family: Lycaenidae
- Genus: Philiris
- Species: P. baiteta

Binomial name
- Philiris baiteta Müller, 2014

= Philiris baiteta =

Species of butterfly

Philiris baiteta is a species of butterfly of the family Lycaenidae. It is found in Papua New Guinea (Western and Madang provinces) and Papua (Snow Mountains).

The length of the forewings is about 14 mm. The ground colour of the forewings is dark uniform brown. The underside is pale yellow cream, grading through white towards the inner margin where the area between the inner margin and vein 2 and the cubitus are light grey brown. The hindwings are dark uniform brown, with a large cream-white apical area.

== Etymology ==
The species is named after the locality in Madang Province where Dr Don Sands collected part of the type series.
