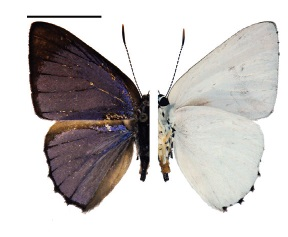

Scientific classification
- Domain: Eukaryota
- Kingdom: Animalia
- Phylum: Arthropoda
- Class: Insecta
- Order: Lepidoptera
- Family: Lycaenidae
- Genus: Philiris
- Species: P. lavendula

Binomial name
- Philiris lavendula Tite, 1963

= Philiris lavendula =

Species of butterfly

Philiris lavendula is a species of butterfly of the family Lycaenidae. It is found in West Irian (Wandesi).

The length of the forewings is about 20 mm.
