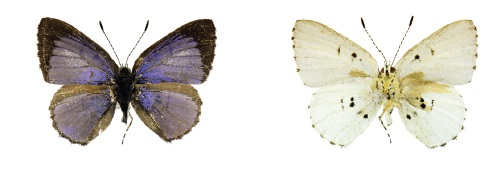

Scientific classification
- Domain: Eukaryota
- Kingdom: Animalia
- Phylum: Arthropoda
- Class: Insecta
- Order: Lepidoptera
- Family: Lycaenidae
- Genus: Philiris
- Species: P. parsonsi

Binomial name
- Philiris parsonsi Müller, 2014

= Philiris parsonsi =

Species of butterfly

Philiris parsonsi is a species of butterfly of the family Lycaenidae. It is found in Papua New Guinea (Western Highlands Province).

The length of the forewings is about 13.5 mm. The ground colour of the forewings is pale lilac blue, with a scattering of white scales in the median area. The hindwings are pale lilac blue, the costa and inner margin dark.

== Etymology ==
The species is named for Dr Michael Parsons, who collected the holotype.
