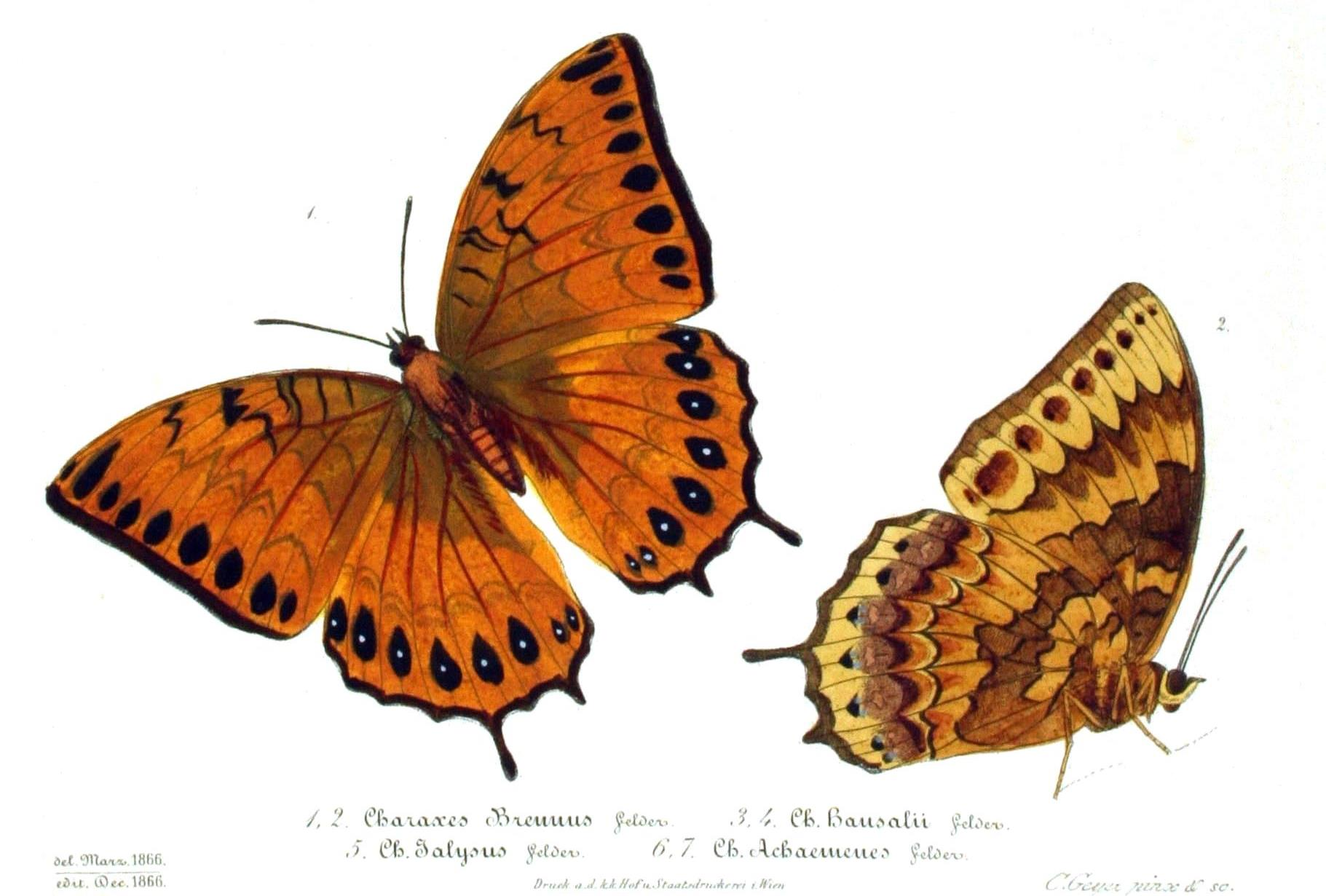
- C. l. brennus of Halmahera, on the equator

Scientific classification
- Domain: Eukaryota
- Kingdom: Animalia
- Phylum: Arthropoda
- Class: Insecta
- Order: Lepidoptera
- Family: Nymphalidae
- Genus: Charaxes
- Species: C. latona

Binomial name
- Charaxes latona Butler, [1866]

Synonyms
- Charaxes brennus C. & R. Felder, [1867]; Charaxes cimon C. & R. Felder, [1867]; Charaxes papuensis Butler, 1869; Charaxes aruanus Butler, 1872; Charaxes layardi Butler, 1896; Charaxes affinis var. gigantea Hagen, 1897

= Charaxes latona =

Orange emperor

Species of Emperor butterfly

Charaxes latona, the orange emperor, is a butterfly of the rajahs and nawabs group, i.e. the Charaxinae group of the brush-footed butterflies family. It is native to the tropical rainforests of eastern Indonesia, western Melanesia and far northern Queensland, Australia, where it is limited to the Iron Range.

== Technical description ==
Charaxes latona Butler, Proc. Zool. Soc. Lond. male, female Body above tawny orange, rather darker in front than behind; below more tawny at sides, but paler in middle; middle or sterna and tip of anterior tarsi pale buff; femora buffish white, speckled with black scales; underside of palpi whitish buff, paler than middle of prosternum.

Male: Winqs above slightly paler than thorax, both with a broad black border, or the discal luniform markings of the forewing and the post-discosubmarginal patches of the hindwing isolated, with intergradations. Underside deeper fulvous than the upperside, less orange, sometimes partly slate-colour, the bars well-defined. Forewing : row of median bars R-SM2 oblique, hence discal interspace R2-SM2 narrower behind than at R2, bar R3- M1 just behind bar R2-R3, or very little more proximal, bars M2-SM2 resembling in shape the number 3, seldom less pointed at (SM1); median bars SC3-R2 continuous, forming an angle upon R1 and reaching R2 midway between median and discal bars R2-R3; discal bars fulvous brown or black, well defined, deeply and regularly arched, continuous, prolonged distad upon the veins; the post-discosubmarginal patches seldom distinct, the paler scaling within them developed costally to some silvery white patches. Hindwing : median bar R3-M1 1 or 2 mm. beyond origin of M1, bar M1-M2 exactly behind it or very little more proximal or distal, bar R2-R3 just in front of it, seldom more proximal; discal bars strongly arched, conspicuous, the series curving distad in middle, hence more parallel to outer edge of wing than in the other fulvous Charaxes; black and blue submarginal dots convex outwardly, admarginal fulvous brown bars arched, hence the paler admarginal interspaces, at the outerside of those dots, much narrowed midway between the veins, being here not wider than, scarcely as wide as, the black dots; upper tail variable in length, triangular, second a mere tooth.

Female: Larger than male; wings broader, paler, but basal region often darker; upper tail longer, but sometimes very short, triangular or of nearly even width, not spatulate, second tail always very much shorter than the first. Wings, upperside : forewing, median bars R2-M1 always marked, bar M1-M2 also frequently present, median bars SC5-R2 generally developed to triangular patches; discal bar deeply incurved, more or less arrowhead-shaped, especially bar R2-R3, black or fulvous, prolonged distad at the veins, these luniform markings in nearly the same position as the discal lunules of the underside, the latter markings, therefore, not shining through above, or the discal lunules of the upperside are partly a little more proximal than those of the underside (in the allied species the reverse is the case); post-discosubmarginal patches more or less ovate, 2 to 7 mm. in diameter, patch SC4-SC5 the largest, black or brownish black, separate from the black, or blackish brown, edge of the wing, but sometimes the admarginal interspace, except the last ones, so densely shaded with black that the rounded outer edge of the spots is scarcely traceable;discal and postdiscal interspaces paler than the basal area of the wing, sometimes white. Hindwing : median bars C-R1 seldom absent, the following two or three seldom present; bar D present only in a few forms; discal luniform bars present in some subspecies, in the subspecies from New Hanover very heavy; post-discosubmarginal patches ovate, the second the largest, the white submarginal dots within them sometimes absent from the upper patches. Underside paler than in male, the submedian, discal, postdiscal and admarginal interspaces of both wings especially pale, bars as in male, discal ones of forewing more arched, the discal interspaces of both wings with fulvous yellow or blackish scaling distally, this scaling forming triangular patches which arc distally bordered by the discal lunules. Length of forewing : male38-45 mm. female, 47–57 mm.

== Biology ==
They fly all year and may complete several generations annually. Males are territorial and occupy perches some 6m up in forest trees, while females frequent forest edges and clearings. Their food plant is Cryptocarya triplinervis.

== Subspecies ==
- Charaxes latona latona (Bacan)
- Charaxes latona artemis Rothschild, 1900 (Sula)
- Charaxes latona aruanus Butler, 1872 (Aru)
- Charaxes latona brennus C. & R. Felder, [1867] (Halmahera)
- Charaxes latona diana Rothschild, 1898 (New Hannover)
- Charaxes latona gigantea Hagen, 1897 (eastern Papua New Guinea)
- Charaxes latona grandis Hanafusa, 1989 (Morotai)
- Charaxes latona insignis Hanafusa, 1991 (Moluccas)
- Charaxes latona layardi Butler, 1896 (Bismarck archipelago)
- Charaxes latona leto Rothschild, 1898 (d'Entrecasteaux Islands)
- Charaxes latona marcia Joicey & Noakes, 1915 (Biak)
- Charaxes latona meridionalis Rothschild, 1900 (south-eastern Papua New Guinea)
- Charaxes latona ombiranus Rothschild, 1900 (Obi)
- Charaxes latona papuensis Butler, 1869 (Irian Jaya)
- Charaxes latona stephanus Rothschild, 1900 (north-eastern Papua New Guinea)
