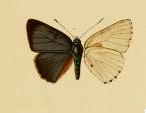

Scientific classification
- Domain: Eukaryota
- Kingdom: Animalia
- Phylum: Arthropoda
- Class: Insecta
- Order: Lepidoptera
- Family: Lycaenidae
- Genus: Philiris
- Species: P. dinawa

Binomial name
- Philiris dinawa (Bethune-Baker, 1908)

Synonyms
- Candalides dinawa Bethune-Baker, 1908

= Philiris dinawa =

Species of butterfly

Philiris dinawa is a species of butterfly of the family Lycaenidae. It is found in Papua New Guinea.
