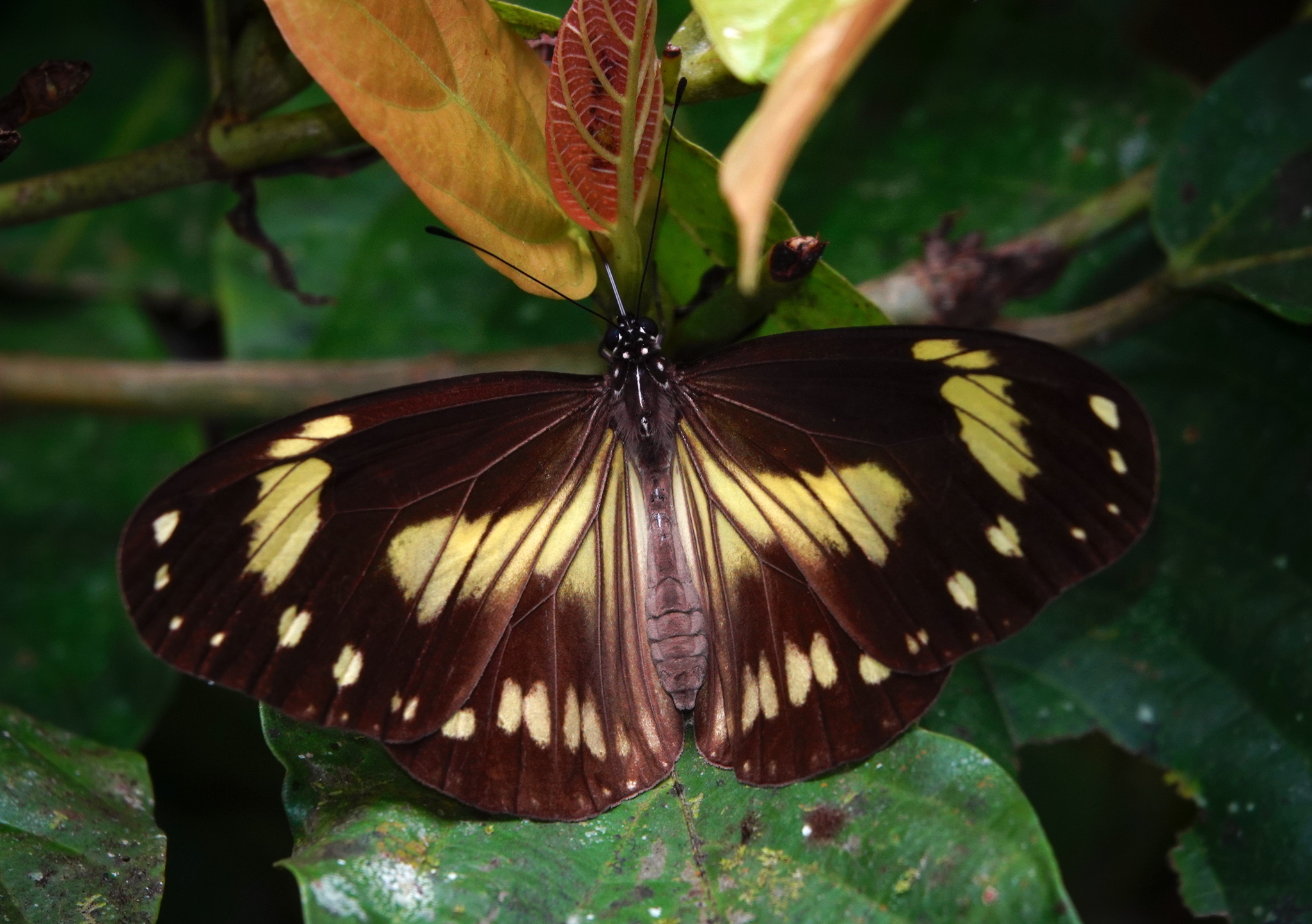

Conservation status
- Least Concern (IUCN 2.3)

Scientific classification
- Kingdom: Animalia
- Phylum: Arthropoda
- Clade: Pancrustacea
- Class: Insecta
- Order: Lepidoptera
- Family: Nymphalidae
- Genus: Ideopsis
- Species: I. klassika

Binomial name
- Ideopsis klassika Martin, 1909

= Seram small tree-nymph =

Species of butterfly

The Seram small tree-nymph (Ideopsis klassika) is a species of nymphalid butterfly in the Danainae family. It is endemic to Seram, Indonesia.
