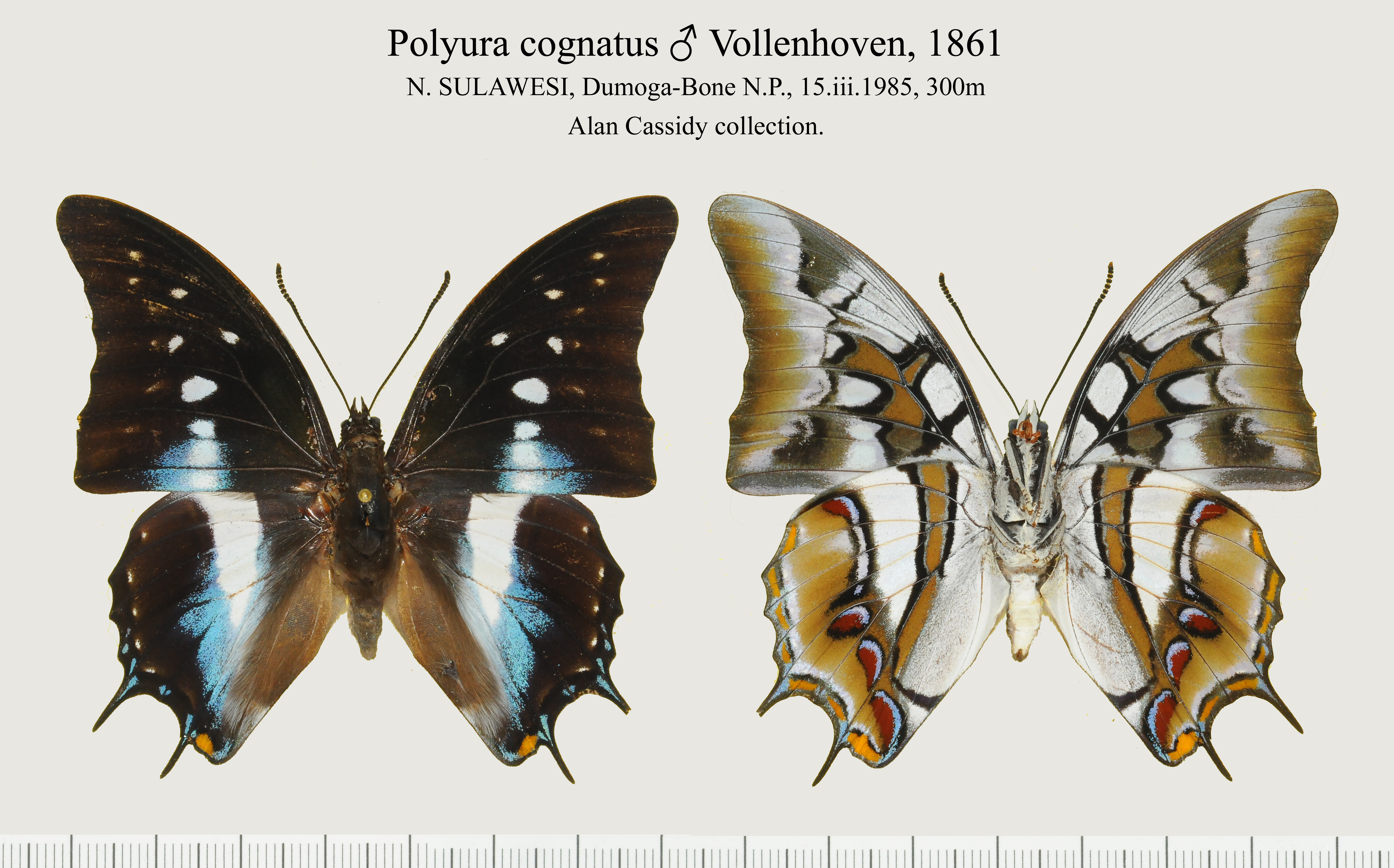

Scientific classification
- Kingdom: Animalia
- Phylum: Arthropoda
- Class: Insecta
- Order: Lepidoptera
- Family: Nymphalidae
- Genus: Charaxes
- Species: C. cognatus

Binomial name
- Charaxes cognatus Vollenhoven, 1861

Synonyms
- Polyura cognatus; Charaxes (Eulepis) cognatus f. kailicus Martin, 1924

= Polyura cognatus =

Species of butterfly

Charaxes (Polyura) cognatus, the Sulawesi blue nawab, is a butterfly in the family Nymphalidae. It was described by Samuel Constantinus Snellen van Vollenhoven in 1861. It is endemic to Sulawesi.

== Description ==
Polyura cognatus is a large butterfly with forewings with a concave outer edge and hindwings with two tails each. The upper side is brown with white dots on the forewings and a white patch bordered with blue on the inner edge, which continues in a wide band on the hind wings. A submarginal line of white dots and blue lines in the centre of the tails complete the ornamentation of the hind wings. The reverse side is beige marked with grey with the same ornamentation of red spots edged with metallic blue and blue lines on the hind wings.

E. cognatus Voll. (135 a) replaces schreiber in Celebes and agrees with it in the rare chromatic symphony of black, blue and white. The white median band of the forewings broken up into single spots, in addition a submarginal series of small white streaks being absent in the schreiber-forms. Median area of the hindwings horter but more extensively encircled by a blue tinge than in the Javanese race of E. schreiber. Tails with heir points nearer to each other. Under surface characterized by a pronounced net of black stripes surrounding and defining two silvery white spots of the cell of the forewing and the median band of the hindwing.cognatus is rare in all the parts of the island, but seems to occur the most numerously in August in the north, as for instance near Palu, as well as in the south of Celebes. The female is not yet discovered.

== Subspecies ==
- C. c. cognatus (Sulawesi)
- C. c. yumikoe Nishimura, 1984 (Banggai)
- C. c. bellona Tsukada, 1991 (South Sulawesi, Tukangbesi)
