= Delias momea =

Scientific classification
- Kingdom: Animalia
- Phylum: Arthropoda
- Class: Insecta
- Order: Lepidoptera
- Family: Pieridae
- Genus: Delias
- Species: D. momea

Binomial name
- Delias momea (Boisduval, 1836)

Species of butterfly

Delias momea is a butterfly in the family Pieridae. It was described by Jean Baptiste Boisduval in 1836 . It is endemic to Sumatra and Java in the Indomalayan realm.

== Description ==
A pretty species only known from Java and Sumatra, where it occurs at elevations of 4–6000 ft., flying slowly and heavily.—momea Bdv., from West Java, where it is not rare at Mt. Gede, has the under surface yellow instead of white, with small white subapical dots. The discocellular is black, only ornamented with small white dots, hindwing distinctly grey-black with diffuse whitish median spots and small submarginal dots. — hageni Rogenh. (= datames Nicev.), from the mountainous parts of Sumatra, almost agrees with momea beneath, except that the hindwing of the hitherto undescribed Female is completely black, and its upper surface is more broadly margined with deep black, with hardly a trace of white dots and the basal part of the hindwing is suffused with blue-grey.

== Subspecies ==
- D. m. momea Sumatra, Java
- D. m. huphinoides Joicey & Talbot, 1925 S.W. Sumatra (Mt. Korintji)
- D. m. hageni Rogenhofer, 1892 Sumatra (Battak Mts)

== Taxonomy ==
Delias momea is a member of the nysa species group.
