= Johannes Röber =

German entomologist (1861–1915)

Johannes Karl Max "Julius" Röber (1861–1942) was a German entomologist who specialised in Lepidoptera.

Röber lived in Dresden, Kingdom of Saxony. He described many new species and genera (taxa).

== Works ==
- Parts of Staudinger, O., and Schatz, E. (Eds.) (1884–1892): Exotische Schmetterlinge.Particularly important is Die Familien und Gattungen in volume 2 and Rober completed part 6 which "illustrates the neuration (wing venation) of nearly five hundred different butterflies, representing almost as many genera and accompanied by some rude details of the structure of the legs, palpi, and antennae, are depicted on the fifty folio plates, while the text (284 pp.) describes the families, lower groups and genera with a statement of the number of species in each" Psyche, June 1892.
- Familie: Pieridae, Satyridae. In Seitz, A. (ed.): Die Gross-Schmetterlinge der Erde,2, Exotische Fauna, 5, Stuttgart, A Kernen (1912).
- Pieridae, pp. 39–74, 374, pls. 17–27. In: Seitz, A. (ed.), Die Groß-Schmetterlinge der Erde. 1. Band. Die palaearctischen Tagfalter. – Stuttgart, Fritz Lehmann.
