= Henley Grose-Smith =

English entomologist (1833–1911)

Henley Grose-Smith (1833–1911) was an English entomologist who specialised in Lepidoptera.

Grose-Smith described many new taxa of butterflies from his own collections and those of Walter Rothschild. His collections were sold to James John Joicey in 1910. Most of his type specimens are in the Natural History Museum London.

== Publications ==
Partial list

- 1887-1902 with William Forsell Kirby Rhopalocera exotica; being illustrations of new, rare, and unfigured species of butterflies.London :Gurney & Jackson,1887-1902. complete text and plates
- 1887 Description of six new species of Butterflies captured by Mr. John Whitehead at Kina Balu Mountain, North Borneo, in the collection of Mr. H. Grose Smith Ann. Mag. nat. Hist. (5) 20: 432-435
- 1889 Descriptions of new species of butterflies captured by Mr. C.M. Woodford in the Solomon Islands Ent. Mon. Mag. 25: 299-303
- 1894 Descriptions of eight new species of butterflies from New Britain and Duke of York Islands in the collections of the Hon. W. Rothschild and Mr. Grose Smith, captured by Captains Cayley Webster and Cotton Ann. Mag. Nat. Hist. (6) 13 (78): 496-502
- 1894 An Account of a Collection of Diurnal Lepidoptera from New Guinea (Parts I-III) - made by Mr. W. Doherty at Humboldt Bay, Dutch New Guinea, and in neighbouring islands, in the Museum of the honourable Walter Rothschild at Tring, with descriptions of new species Novit. zool. 1 (2): 331-365 543-551 (3): 571-584
- 1894 Descriptions of nine new species of butterflies, from the Sattelberg, near Finsch Hafen, German New Guinea, in the collections of the Honourable Walter Rothschild and H. Grose Smith, captured by Captains Cayley Webster and Cotton Novit. Zool. 1 (3): 585-590
- 1897 Descriptions of further new Species of Butterflies from the Pacific Island Ann. Mag. Nat. Hist. (6) 20: 515-518
- 1898 Description of two new species of butterflies of the genus Thysonotis Hübner, [1819] Ann. Mag. Nat. Hist. (7) 2 (11): 404-405
