= Philip Crowley (entomologist) =

English naturalist and entomologist

Philip Crowley (1837 in Alton – 1900 in Croydon) was an English naturalist and entomologist specialising in Lepidoptera.

He was a Quaker and a partner in a brewing business.

He was a fellow of the Linnean Society, the Zoological Society of London and the Entomological Society of London.

His extensive collections of Lepidoptera and bird eggs are in the Natural History Museum, London. His extensive oology collection was at the time (1901) regarded as one of the "most valuable donations to the museum".

He named several taxa.

Crowley's tiger, a nymphalid butterfly, was named to honour him.
