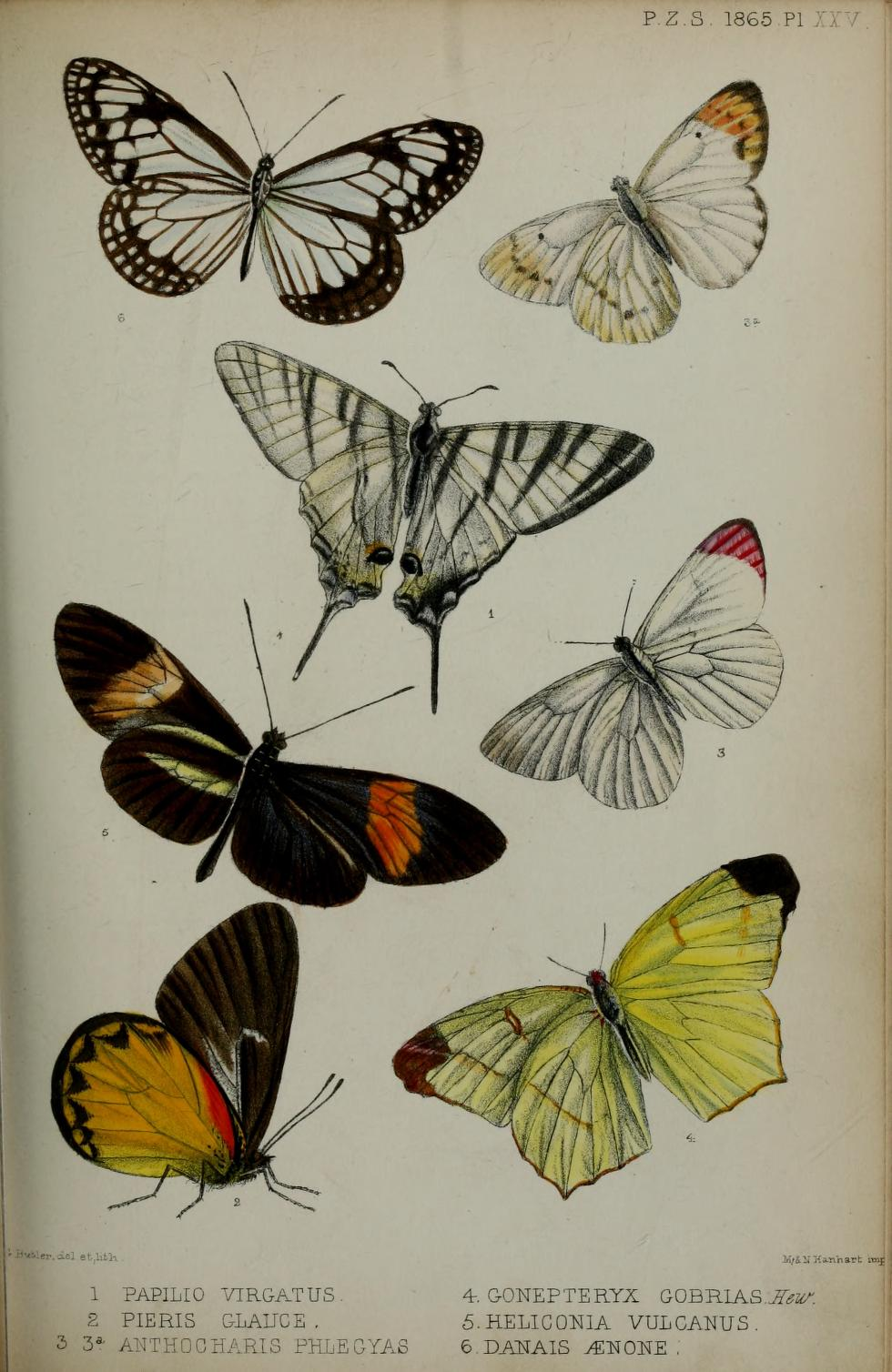
- Illustration of Parantica vitrina can be found in illustration 6 under the name Danaus aenone, a taxonomic synonym

Scientific classification
- Kingdom: Animalia
- Phylum: Arthropoda
- Clade: Pancrustacea
- Class: Insecta
- Order: Lepidoptera
- Family: Nymphalidae
- Genus: Parantica
- Species: P. vitrina

Binomial name
- Parantica vitrina (C. & R. Felder, 1861)

Synonyms
- Danais vitrina; Danais oenone; Parantica odrysia

= Parantica vitrina =

Species of butterfly

Parantica vitrina, the Filipino glassy tiger, is a species of tiger butterfly that belongs to the family of brush-footed butterflies. This species can be found throughout the Islands of the Philippines including the Catanduanes and Samar islands.
