= Toxopeus =

Toxopeus is a Dutch surname. It is a Grecism for bowman, from Greek τοξοποιός, and was probably adopted by people named boogman. People with this name include:

- Edzo Toxopeus (1918–2009), Dutch politician, Minister of the Interior 1959–65
- Jacqueline Toxopeus (born 1964), Dutch field hockey goalkeeper
- Lambertus Johannes Toxopeus (1894–1951), Java-born Dutch lepidopterist

== See also ==
- Toxopeus' yellow tiger, butterfly named after Lambertus Toxopeus
