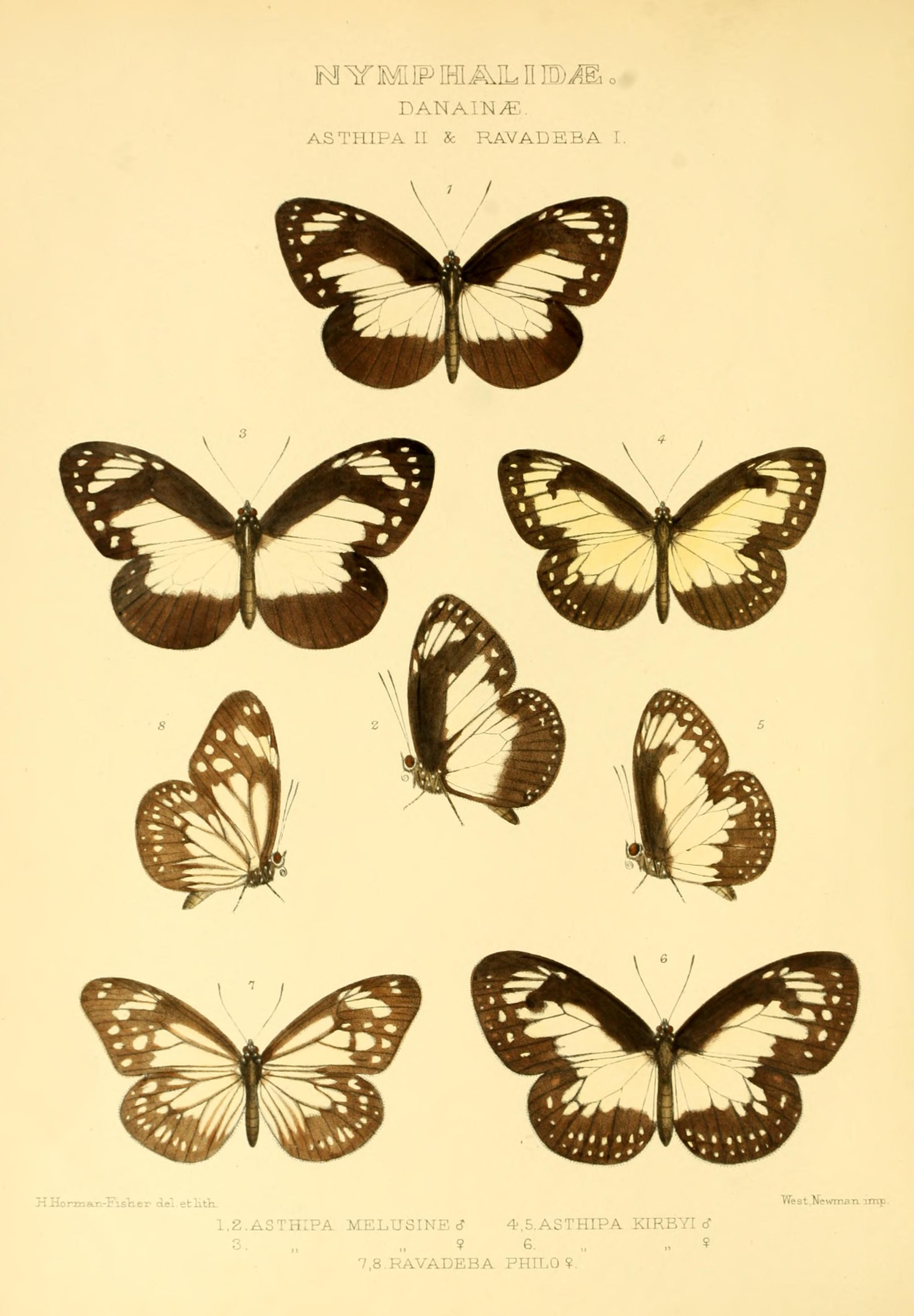
- Illustration of Parantica melusine in (1) and (2) labeled as Asthipa melusine, a taxonomic synonym

Scientific classification
- Kingdom: Animalia
- Phylum: Arthropoda
- Clade: Pancrustacea
- Class: Insecta
- Order: Lepidoptera
- Family: Nymphalidae
- Genus: Parantica
- Species: P. melusine

Binomial name
- Parantica melusine (Grose-Smith, 1894)

Subspecies
- See text

Synonyms
- Asthipa melusine

= Parantica melusine =

Species of butterfly

Parantica melusine is a species of tiger butterfly that belongs to the family of brush-footed butterflies. The is species can be found on the Island of New Guinea.

== Description ==
This species resembles the Kirby's tiger (Parantica kirbyi) with similar markings on their bodies. The upperside of this species wings are black with white hyaline spots.

=== Sexual dimorphism ===
This species exhibits sexual dimorphism. Females of this species are similar to males but their wings are more rounded. Females also possess a double row of submarginal spots on the underside of the anterior wings.

== Taxonomy ==
This species contains several subspecies. They are listed below:

- Parantica melusine commixta
- Parantica melusine cythion
- Parantica melusine grosesmithi
- Parantica melusine meeki
- Parantica melusine oetakwensis
- Parantica melusine siris
