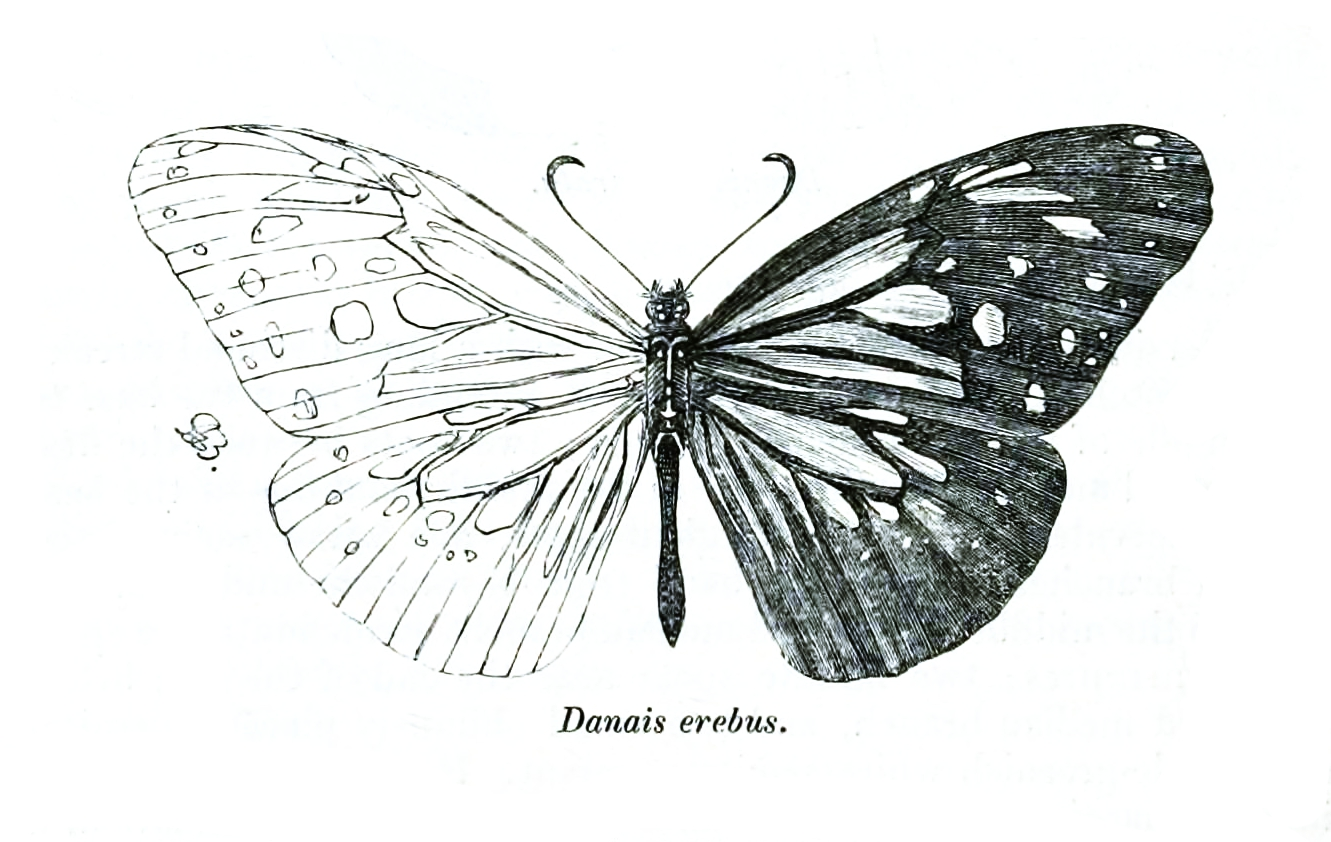
- Illustration of Parantica luzonensis luzonensis labeled as Danais erebus, a taxonomic synonym

Scientific classification
- Kingdom: Animalia
- Phylum: Arthropoda
- Clade: Pancrustacea
- Class: Insecta
- Order: Lepidoptera
- Family: Nymphalidae
- Genus: Parantica
- Species: P. luzonensis

Binomial name
- Parantica luzonensis (C. & R. Felder, 1863)

Subspecies
- See text

Synonyms
- Danais erebus= Parantica luzonensis luzonensis; Danais luzonensis

= Parantica luzonensis =

Species of butterfly

Parantica luzonensis, also commonly known as the Luzon glassy tiger, is a species of tiger butterfly that belongs to the family of brush-footed butterflies. This species has a wide range being found in Southeast Asia including Indonesia, Malaysia and the Philippine Islands among other places.

== Description ==
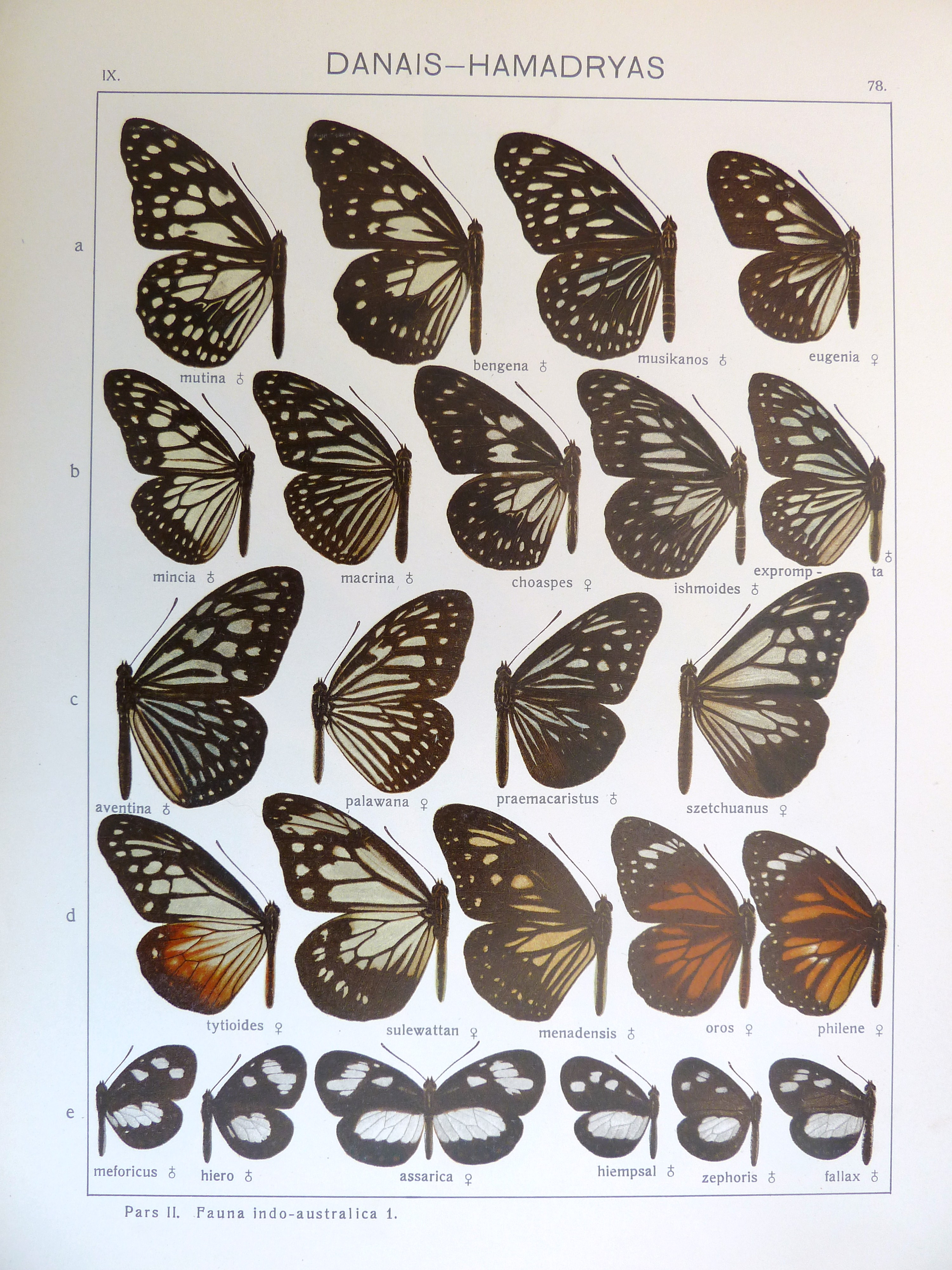
An illustration of Parantica luzonensis praemacaristus can be found in the center row.

Their thorax is black and is covered in large white spots. Their abdomen is brown above but more white below.

=== Wings ===
The upperside of this species has a smoky brown coloration with all the markings being hyaline. A brown streak can be found above the inner margin. The basal area of the front wings are divided into three unequal transparent parts. The basal area of the hindwings are divided into twelve unequal parts by the nervures. The underside of the front and hind wings are similar to the upperside but more paler at the apex. In addition, several submarginal spots can be seen along the outer margin.

== Taxonomy ==
This species contains many subspecies. They are listed below:

- Parantica luzonensis aurensis
- Parantica luzonensis banksii
- Parantica luzonensis erebus
- Parantica luzonensis flora
- Parantica luzonensis formosana
- Parantica luzonensis funeralis
- Parantica luzonensis larissa
- Parantica luzonensis mnasippus
- Parantica luzonensis orientis
- Parantica luzonensis panaitius
- Parantica luzonensis praemacaristus
- Parantica luzonensis simonides
