= Milagros' tiger =

Conservation status
- Endangered (IUCN 2.3)

Scientific classification
- Kingdom: Animalia
- Phylum: Arthropoda
- Clade: Pancrustacea
- Class: Insecta
- Order: Lepidoptera
- Family: Nymphalidae
- Genus: Parantica
- Species: P. milagros

Binomial name
- Parantica milagros Schröder & Treadaway, 1880

Species of butterfly

The Milagros' tiger (Parantica milagros) is a species of nymphalid butterfly in the Danainae subfamily. It is endemic to the Philippines.
