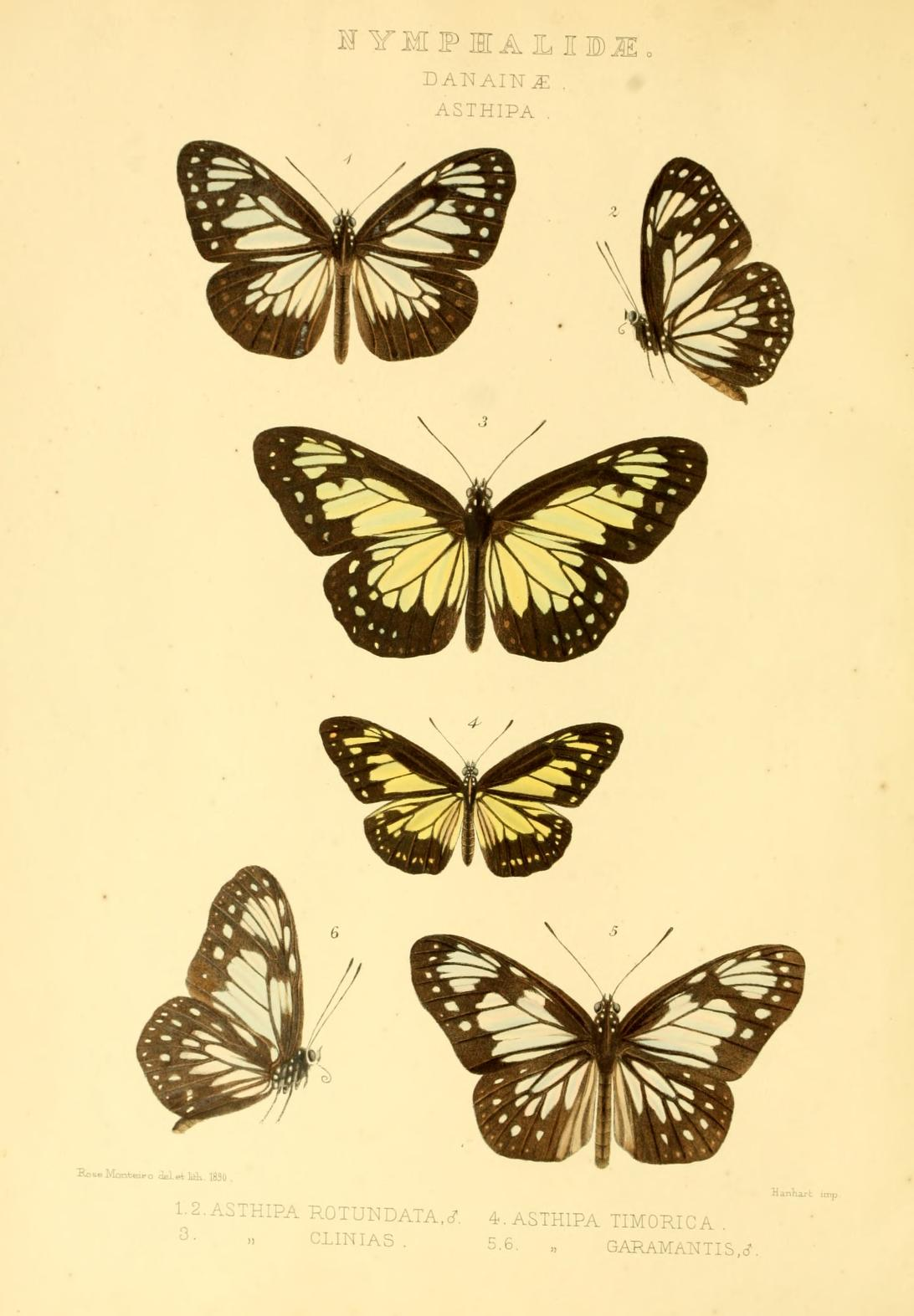
- Parantica clinias figure 3

Conservation status
- Vulnerable (IUCN 2.3)

Scientific classification
- Kingdom: Animalia
- Phylum: Arthropoda
- Clade: Pancrustacea
- Class: Insecta
- Order: Lepidoptera
- Family: Nymphalidae
- Genus: Parantica
- Species: P. clinias

Binomial name
- Parantica clinias (Grose-Smith, 1890)

Synonyms
- Asthipa clinias Grose-Smith, 1890

= New Ireland yellow tiger =

Species of butterfly

The New Ireland yellow tiger (Parantica clinias) is a species of nymphalid butterfly in the subfamily Danainae. It is endemic to the island of New Ireland (Papua New Guinea).
