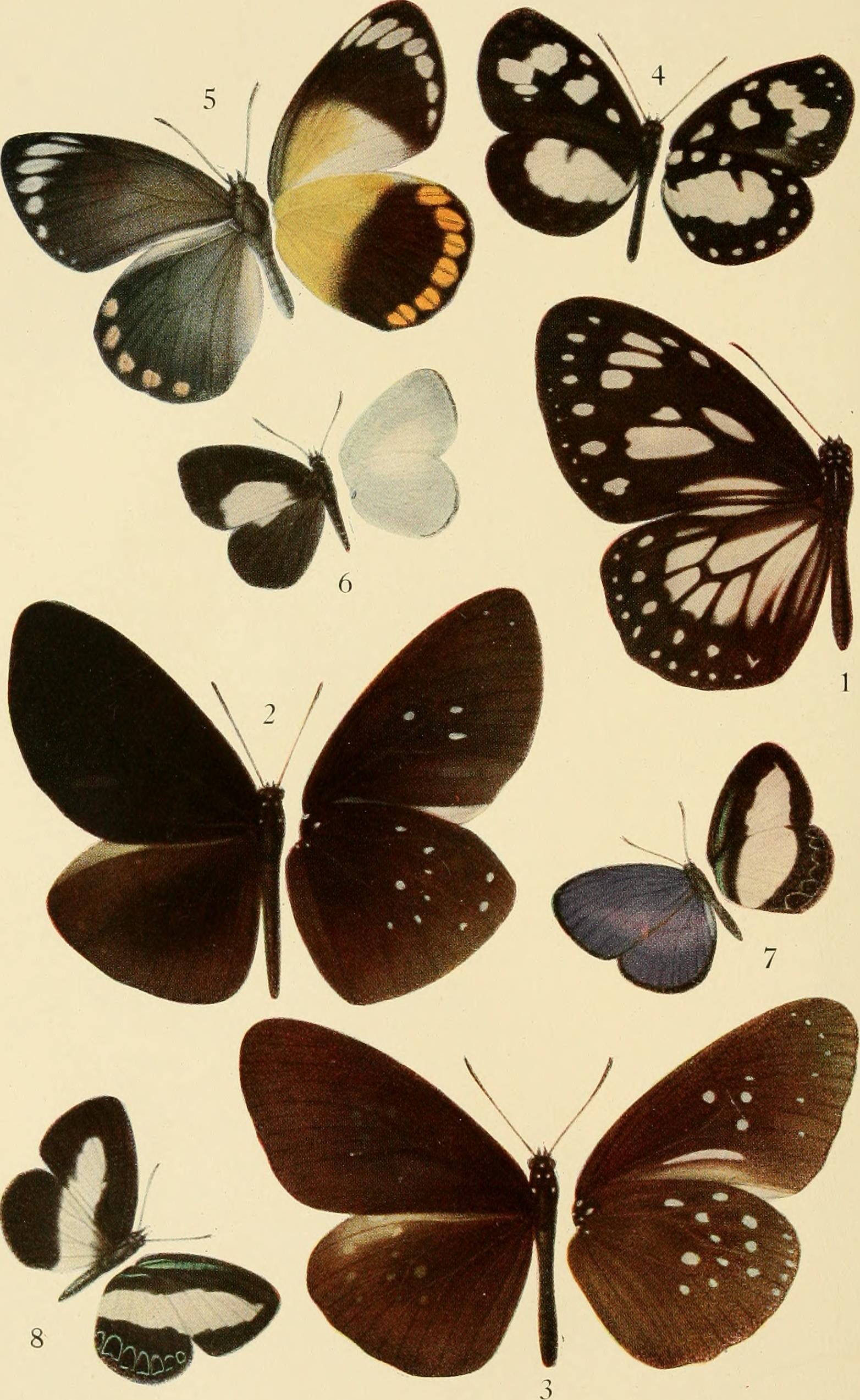
- Parantica marcia female (figure 1)

Conservation status
- Endangered (IUCN 2.3)

Scientific classification
- Kingdom: Animalia
- Phylum: Arthropoda
- Clade: Pancrustacea
- Class: Insecta
- Order: Lepidoptera
- Family: Nymphalidae
- Genus: Parantica
- Species: P. marcia

Binomial name
- Parantica marcia (Joicey & Talbot, 1916)

= Biak tiger =

Species of butterfly

The Biak tiger (Parantica marcia) is a species of nymphalid butterfly in the Danainae subfamily. It is endemic to Biak in Indonesia.
