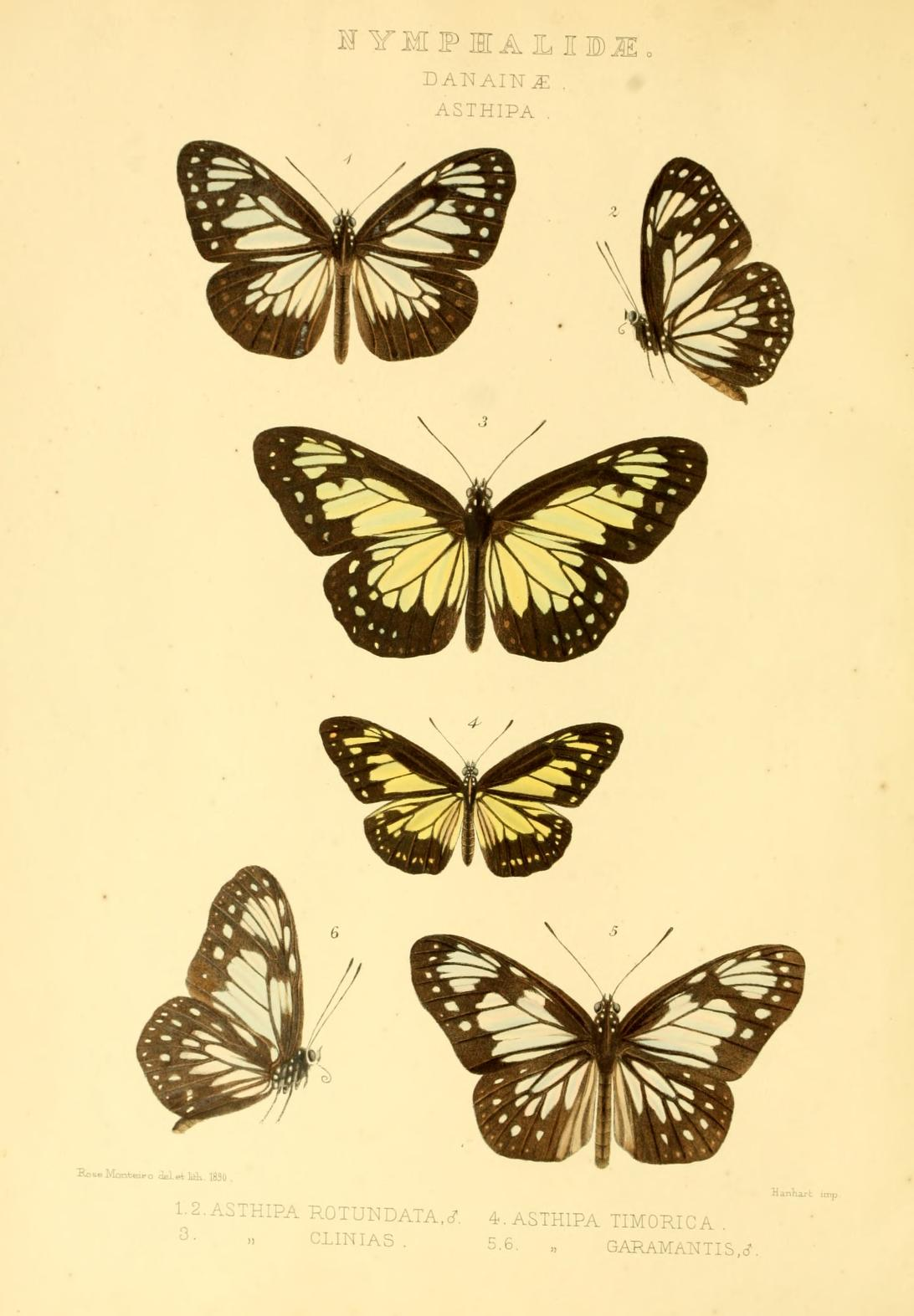
- Parantica rotundata figures 1, 2

Conservation status
- Least Concern (IUCN 2.3)

Scientific classification
- Kingdom: Animalia
- Phylum: Arthropoda
- Clade: Pancrustacea
- Class: Insecta
- Order: Lepidoptera
- Family: Nymphalidae
- Genus: Parantica
- Species: P. rotundata

Binomial name
- Parantica rotundata (Grose-Smith, 1890)

= Fat tiger =

Species of butterfly

The fat tiger (Parantica rotundata) is a species of nymphalid butterfly in the Danainae subfamily. It is endemic to Papua New Guinea.
