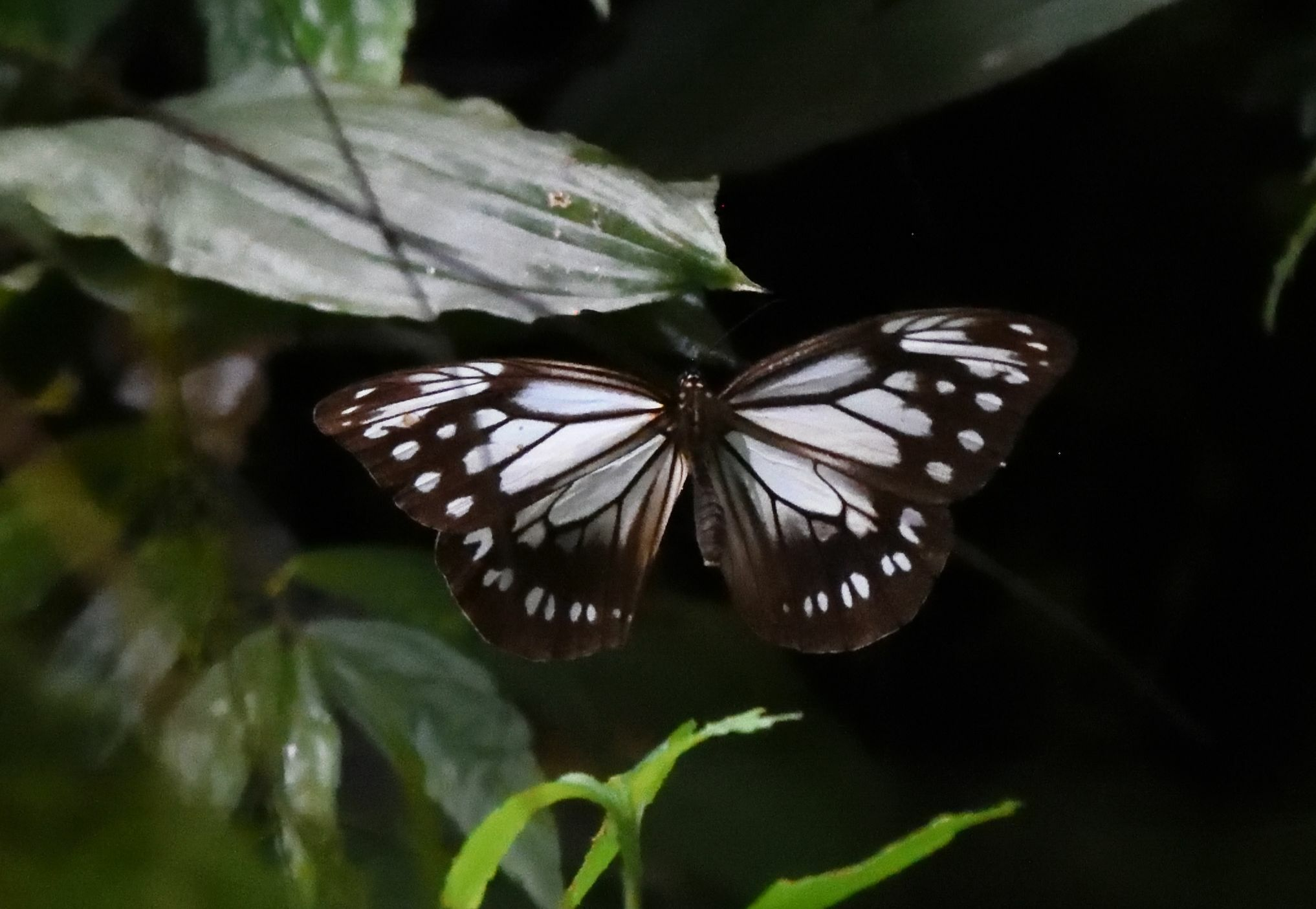

Conservation status
- Endangered (IUCN 2.3)

Scientific classification
- Kingdom: Animalia
- Phylum: Arthropoda
- Clade: Pancrustacea
- Class: Insecta
- Order: Lepidoptera
- Family: Nymphalidae
- Genus: Parantica
- Species: P. sulewattan

Binomial name
- Parantica sulewattan (Fruhstorfer, 1896)

= Bonthain tiger =

Species of butterfly

The Bonthain tiger (Parantica sulewattan) is a species of nymphalid butterfly in the Danainae subfamily. It is endemic to Sulawesi, Indonesia.
