= Flores tiger =

Conservation status
- Vulnerable (IUCN 2.3)

Scientific classification
- Kingdom: Animalia
- Phylum: Arthropoda
- Clade: Pancrustacea
- Class: Insecta
- Order: Lepidoptera
- Family: Nymphalidae
- Genus: Parantica
- Species: P. wegneri

Binomial name
- Parantica wegneri (Nieuwenhuis, 1960)

Species of butterfly

The Flores tiger (Parantica wegneri) is a species of nymphalid butterfly in the Danainae subfamily. It is endemic to Flores, Indonesia.
