= David's tiger =

Conservation status
- Critically Endangered (IUCN 2.3)

Scientific classification
- Kingdom: Animalia
- Phylum: Arthropoda
- Clade: Pancrustacea
- Class: Insecta
- Order: Lepidoptera
- Family: Nymphalidae
- Genus: Parantica
- Species: P. davidi

Binomial name
- Parantica davidi (Schröder, 1976)

Species of butterfly

The David's tiger (Parantica davidi) is a species of nymphalid butterfly in the Danainae subfamily. It is endemic to the Philippines.
