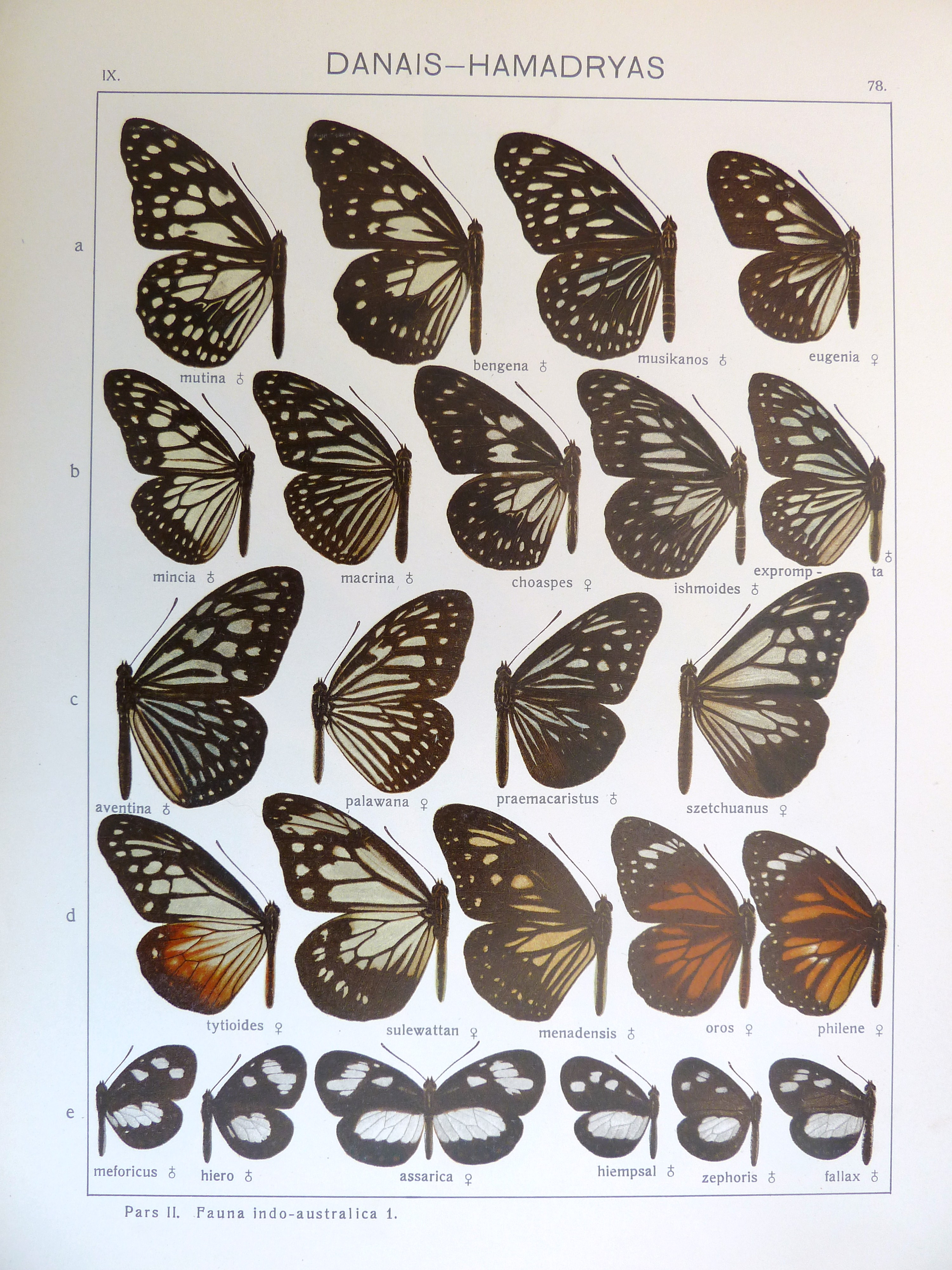

Conservation status
- Near Threatened (IUCN 2.3)

Scientific classification
- Kingdom: Animalia
- Phylum: Arthropoda
- Clade: Pancrustacea
- Class: Insecta
- Order: Lepidoptera
- Family: Nymphalidae
- Genus: Parantica
- Species: P. tityoides

Binomial name
- Parantica tityoides (Hagen, 1890)

= Sumatran chocolate tiger =

Species of butterfly

The Sumatran chocolate tiger (Parantica tityoides) is a species of nymphalid butterfly in the Danainae subfamily. It is endemic to Indonesia.
