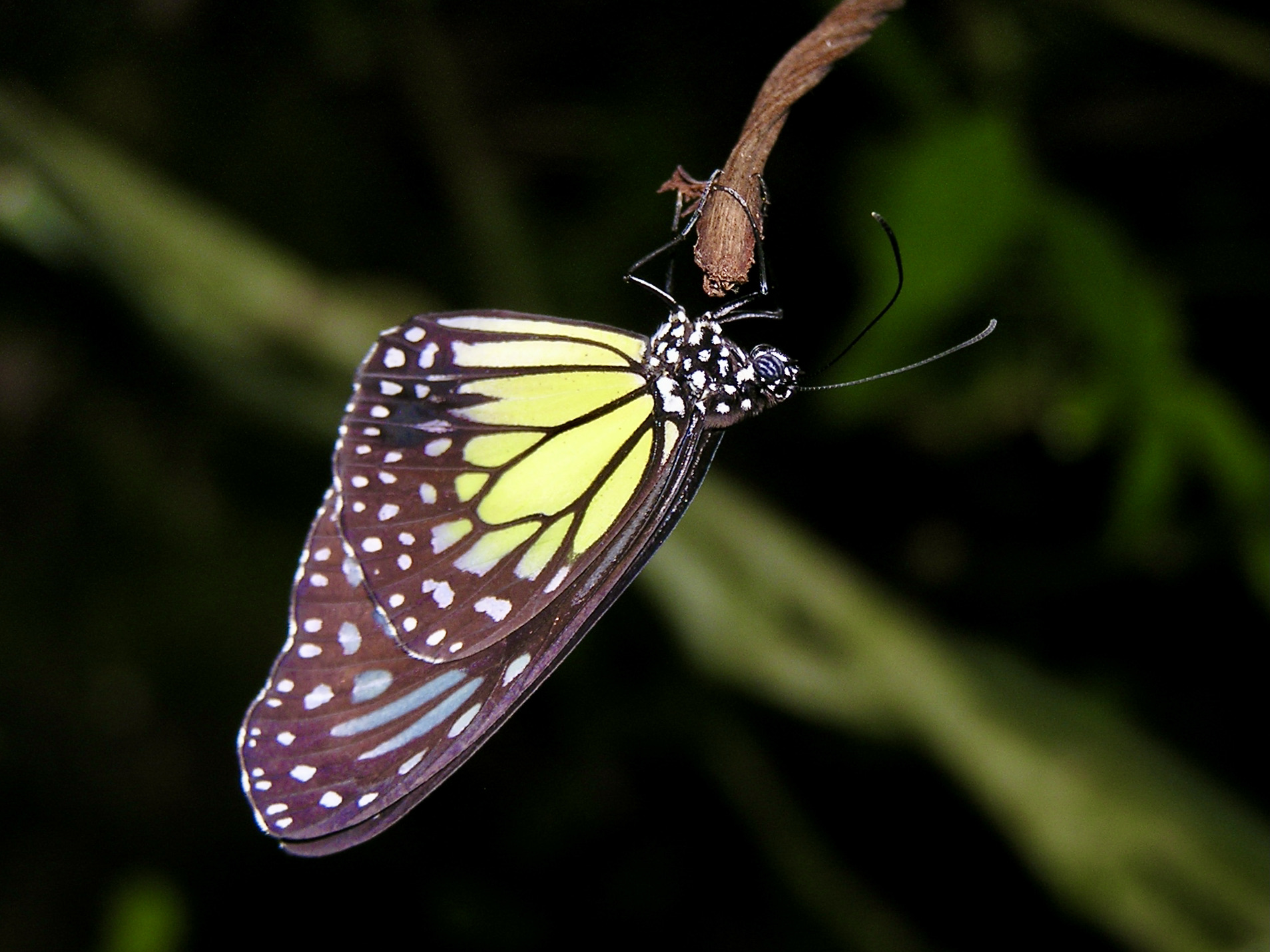
- in Kuala Lumpur Butterfly Park.

Scientific classification
- Kingdom: Animalia
- Phylum: Arthropoda
- Clade: Pancrustacea
- Class: Insecta
- Order: Lepidoptera
- Family: Nymphalidae
- Genus: Parantica
- Species: P. aspasia

Binomial name
- Parantica aspasia (Fabricius, 1787)

Synonyms
- List: Papilio aspasia Fabricius, 1787; Danais crocea Butler, 1866; Danais dorippa Butler, 1866; Bahora crocea Moore, 1890

= Parantica aspasia =

Yellow glassy tiger

Species of brush-footed butterfly found in Asia

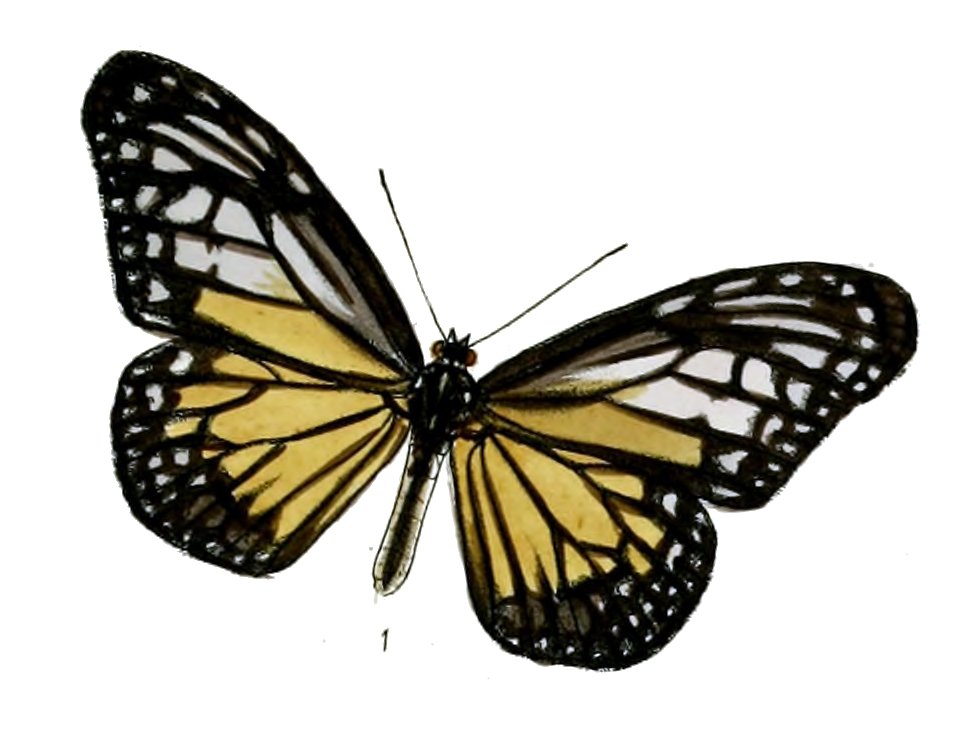
Illustration from F. C. Moore - Lepidoptera Indica. Volume 1. 1890

Parantica aspasia, the yellow glassy tiger, is a butterfly found in Asia that belongs to the crows and tigers, that is, the danaid group of the brush-footed butterflies family.

Video clip

== Subspecies ==
Subspecies include:

- Parantica aspasia annetta (Swinhoe, 1915)
- Parantica aspasia aspasia Morishita, 1970
- Parantica aspasia caulonia Fruhstorfer, 1911
- Parantica aspasia cerilla (Fruhstorfer, 1911)
- Parantica aspasia chrysea Doherty, 1891
- Parantica aspasia flymbra Fruhstorfer, 1910
- Parantica aspasia kheili Staudinger, 1885
- Parantica aspasia philomela Zinken-Sommer, 1831
- Parantica cleona rita Fruhstorfer, 1905
- Parantica aspasia shelfordi Fruhstorfer, 1905
- Parantica aspasia thargalia Fruhstorfer, 1910
- Parantica aspasia viridana Corbet, 1942

== Distribution and habitat ==
This species is present in Myanmar, Thailand, Vietnam, Langkawi, W. Malaysia, Singapore, Borneo, Java, Bali, Philippines. In Singapore it is probably extinct. These butterflies mainly inhabit forested areas.

== Description ==
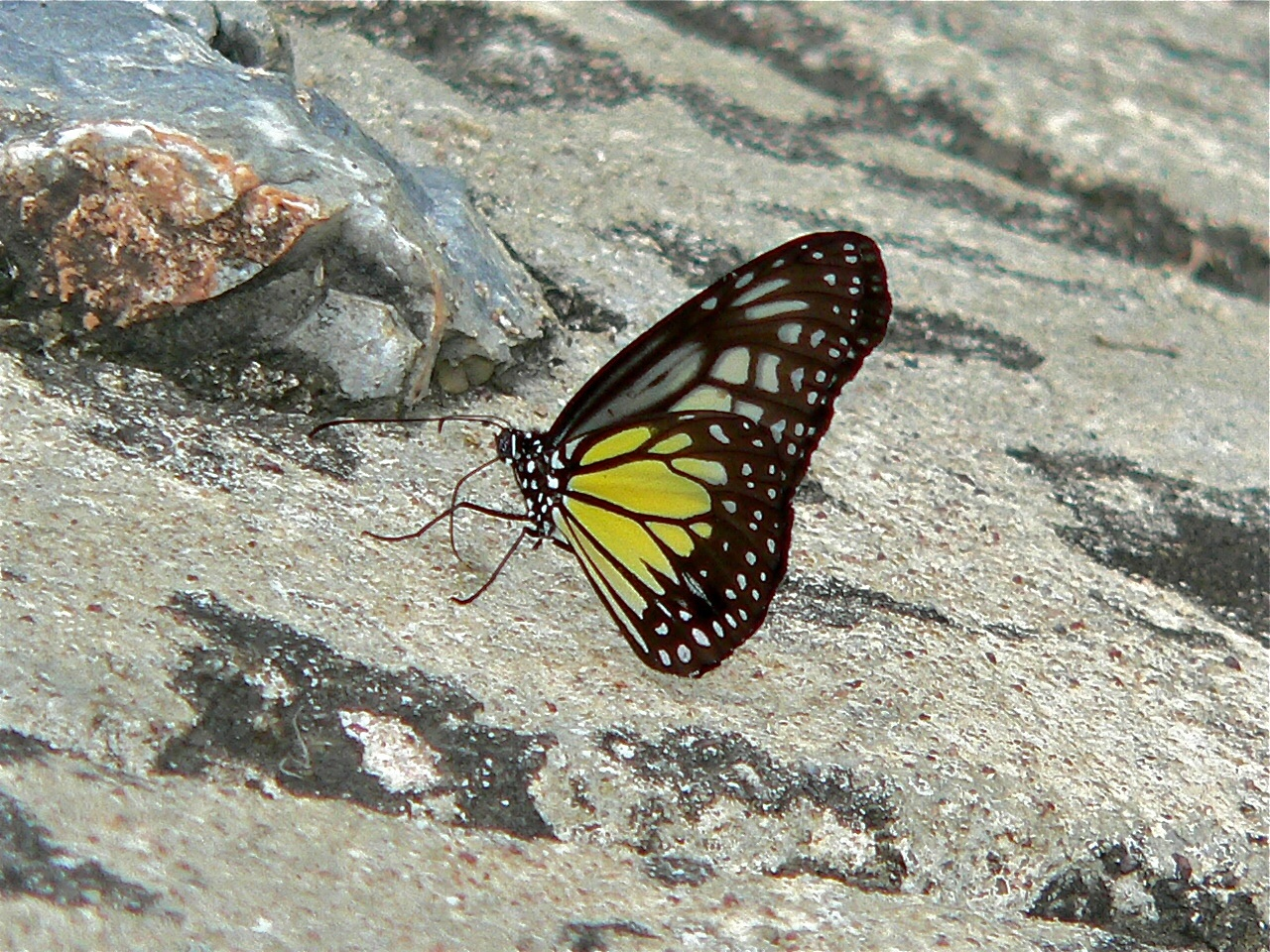
Yellow Glassy Tiger

Parantica aspasia has a wingspan of about 60–75 mm (2.4–3.0 in). These butterflies have bluish grey wings, with a bright yellow and rather large basal patch and black markings.

== Biology ==
Adults can be found all year around, with a peak in September–October and in December. The females lay a single whitish spindle-shaped egg. The caterpillar hatch after about four days. They mainly feed on Gymnema species, Raphistemma species, and Vincetoxicum (syn. Tylophora) species (Asclepiadaceae).

After about 14 days and five instars the caterpillars pupate, anchoring themselves to the stem or leaves the host plant. The pupa is light green with black dots. After about eight days the adult butterflies emerge.

== See also ==
- List of butterflies of India (Danainae)

== Bibliography ==
- Butler, A.G.,1866 : A Monograph of the diurnal Lepidoptera belonging to the genus Danais, being a revision of the Insects of that Genus, with Descriptions of new species in the National Collection.- Proc. zool. Soc. Lond. 1866
- Fabricius, J.C.,1787 : Mantissa Insectorum sistens eorum species nuper detectas adiectis characteribus genericis, differentiis specificis, emendationibus, observationibus. Copenhagen, Christ. Gottl. Proft.
- Fruhstorfer, H., 1905 : Neue Rhopaloceren aus dem Indo-Australischen Gebiet. Ent. Zeit.
