= Morishita's tiger =

Conservation status
- Least Concern (IUCN 3.1)

Scientific classification
- Kingdom: Animalia
- Phylum: Arthropoda
- Clade: Pancrustacea
- Class: Insecta
- Order: Lepidoptera
- Family: Nymphalidae
- Genus: Parantica
- Species: P. hypowattan

Binomial name
- Parantica hypowattan Morishita, 1981

Species of butterfly

The Morishita's tiger (Parantica hypowattan) is a species of butterfly in the family Danaidae. It is endemic to Sulawesi, Indonesia.
