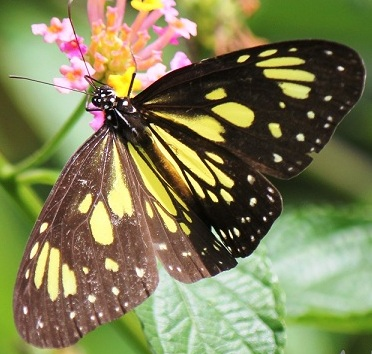
- Upperside

Scientific classification
- Kingdom: Animalia
- Phylum: Arthropoda
- Class: Insecta
- Order: Lepidoptera
- Family: Nymphalidae
- Genus: Parantica
- Species: P. cleona

Binomial name
- Parantica cleona (Fruhstorfer, 1892)

Synonyms
- Papilio cleona Stoll, [1782]; Danais keiensis van Eecke, 1915; Danais lutescens Butler, 1866; Danais cleona var. (ab?) talautica Piepers & Snellen, 1896; Danais (Ravadeba) luciptena Westwood, 1888; Ravadebra luciplena Rothschild, 1892; Danaida cleona tigrana Fruhstorfer, 1910

= Parantica cleona =

Species of butterfly

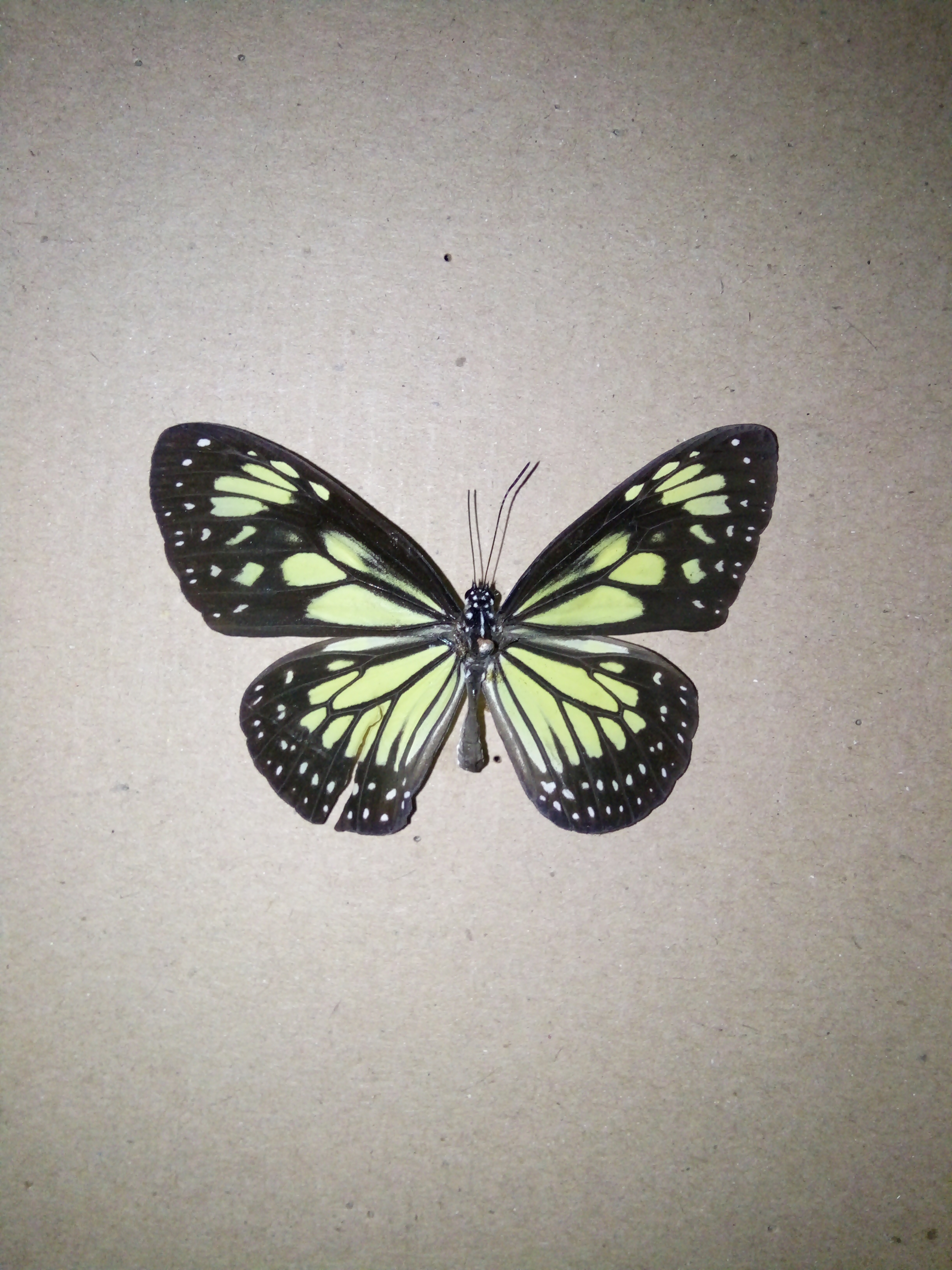
P. c. luciplena, from Buladu, North Gorontalo, Sulawesi

Parantica cleona is a butterfly endemic to Indonesia which was described by Hans Fruhstorfer in 1892.

== Subspecies ==
- P. c. cleona Ambon, Serang
- P. c. lutescens (Butler, 1866) (Buru)
- P. c. talautica (Piepers & Snellen, 1896) (Talaud)
- P. c. lucida Fruhstorfer, 1899 (Sula)
- P. c. eucleona Fruhstorfer, 1903 (Obi)
- P. c. luciplena Fruhstorfer, 1910 (Sulawesi, Salayar, Wowoni, Buton, Banggai)
- P. c. tigrana (Fruhstorfer, 1910) (Halmahera, Bachan)
