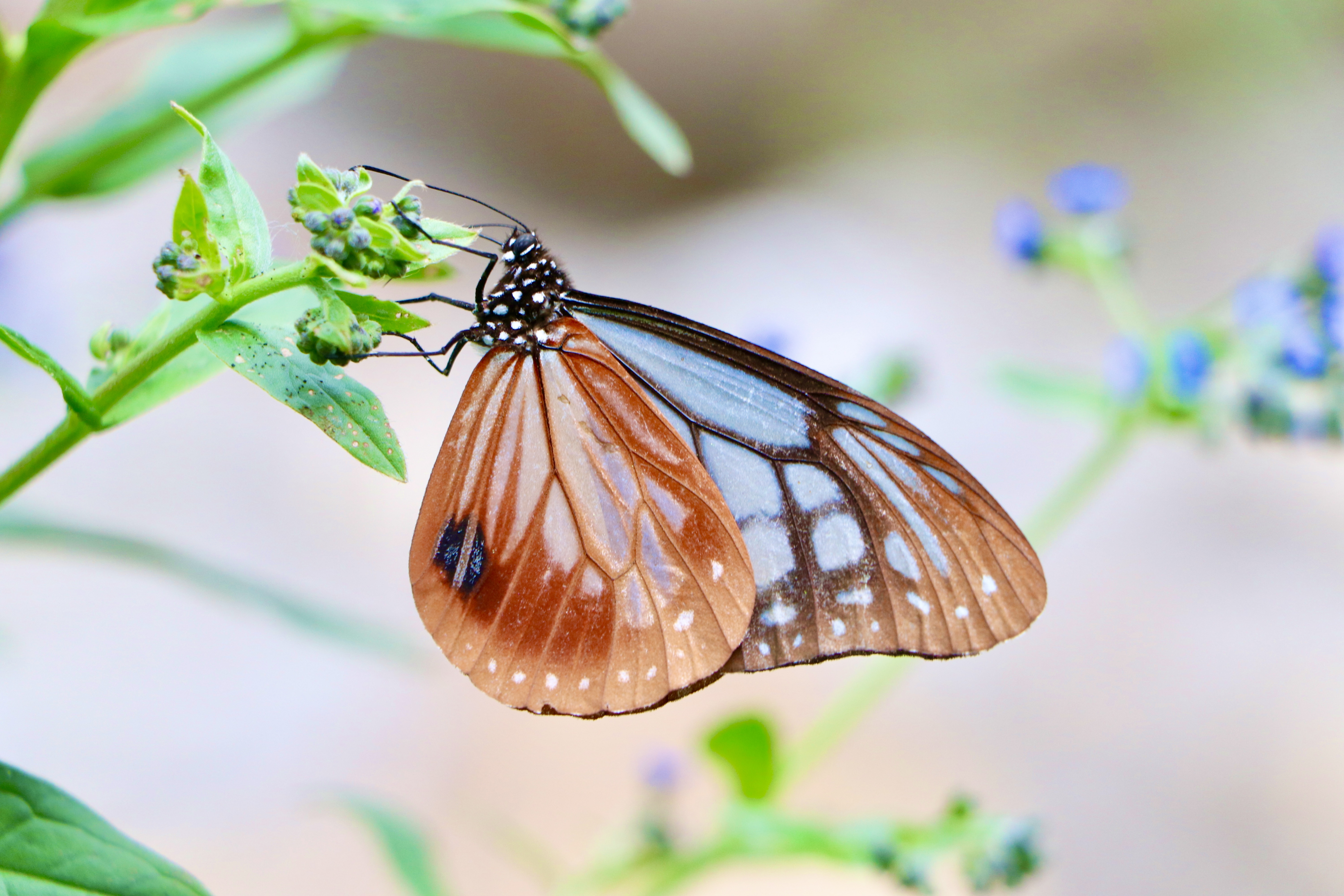
- Underside
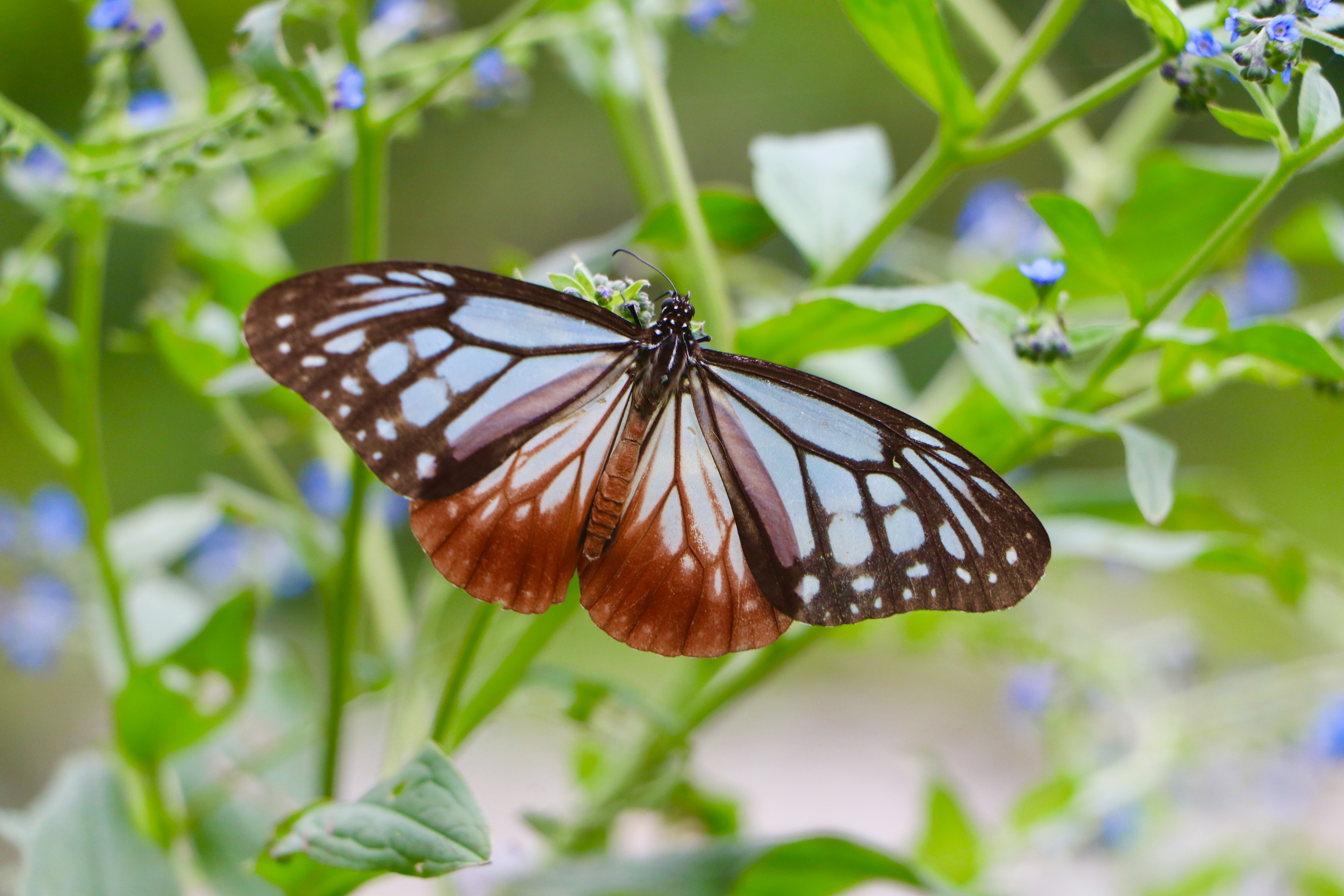
- Upperside

Scientific classification
- Kingdom: Animalia
- Phylum: Arthropoda
- Clade: Pancrustacea
- Class: Insecta
- Order: Lepidoptera
- Family: Nymphalidae
- Tribe: Danaini
- Subtribe: Danaina
- Genus: Parantica
- Species: P. pedonga

Binomial name
- Parantica pedonga Fujioka, 1970

= Parantica pedonga =

Species of butterfly

Parantica pedonga, also known as the Pedong tiger or the Talbot's chestnut tiger, is a butterfly in the family Nymphalidae. It is found in North-east India, Bhutan, Nepal and Tibet. It was described by Tomoo Fujioka in 1970. This species is monotypic.

== Description ==
This species is similar to Parantica sita, but the sex brand does not extend to Vein 2. The hindwing stripe in space 1a is usually well developed in Parantica melaneus unlike in pedonga.
