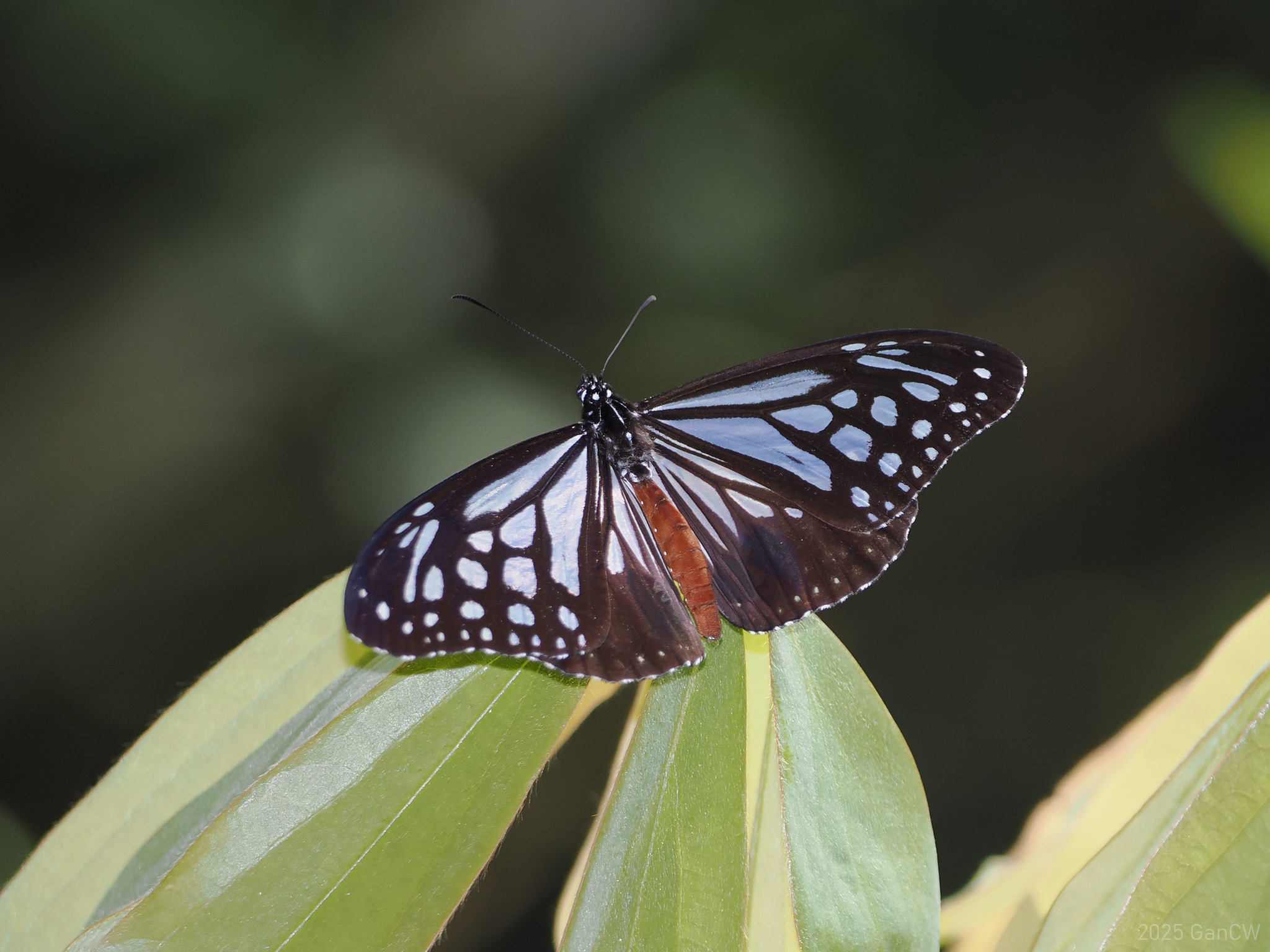

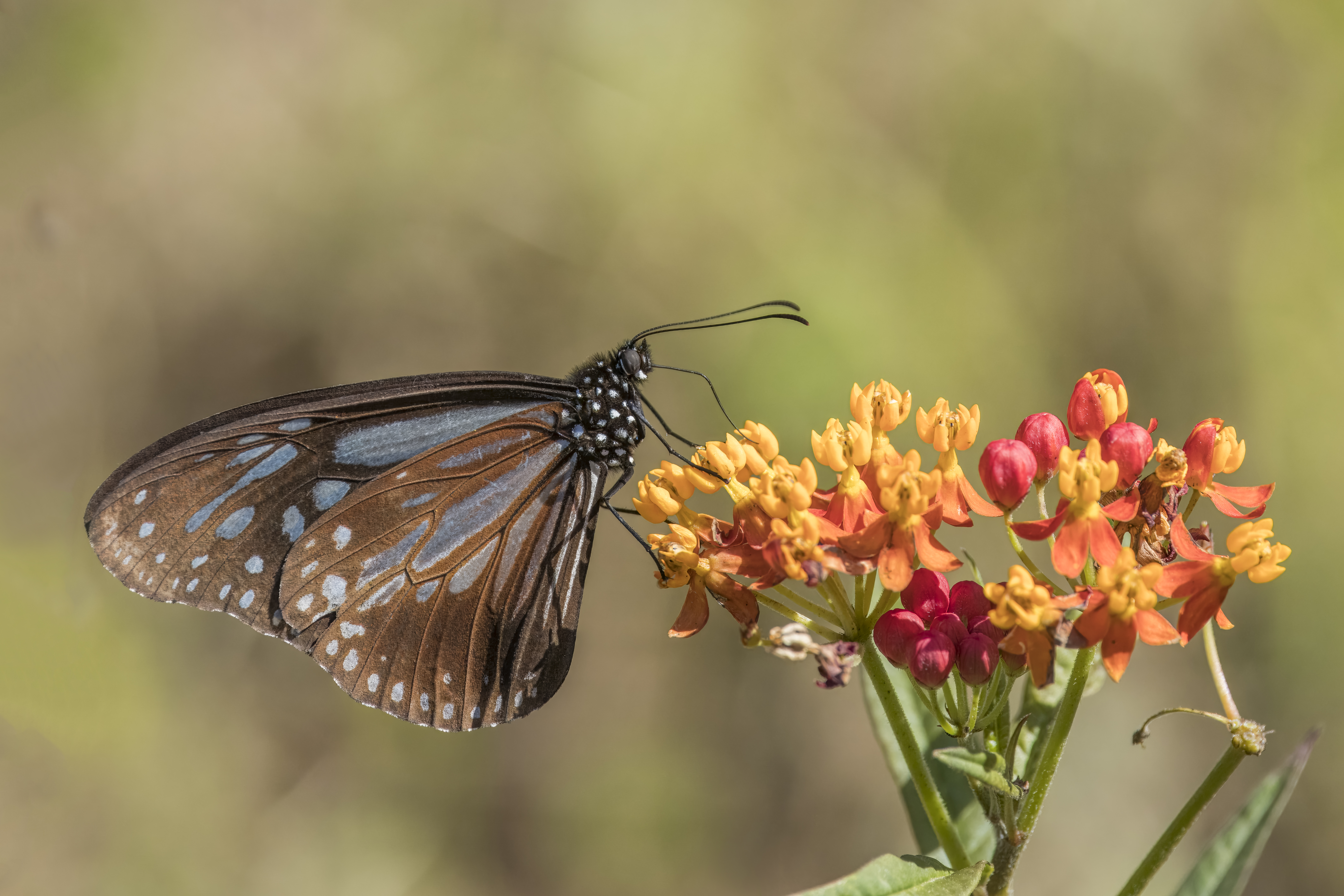
- both in Taiwan

Scientific classification
- Kingdom: Animalia
- Phylum: Arthropoda
- Clade: Pancrustacea
- Class: Insecta
- Order: Lepidoptera
- Family: Nymphalidae
- Genus: Parantica
- Species: P. swinhoei

Binomial name
- Parantica swinhoei (Moore, 1883)

= Parantica swinhoei =

Species of butterfly

Parantica swinhoei, also known as the Swinhoe's chocolate tiger, is a butterfly in the family Nymphalidae. It is found from North-east India to Taiwan. It was described by Frederic Moore in 1883.

== Description ==
This species differs from Parantica melaneus by its shorter and more triangular forewing and shorter hindwing. The markings are darker blue and are smaller and narrower than melaneus. The underside of the hindwing is chestnut red in colour.

== Subspecies ==
There are two subspecies-

- Parantica swinhoei swinhoei (Moore, 1883) - Taiwan
- Parantica swinhoei szechuana (Fruhstorfer, 1899) - Northeast India, China
