= Kuekenthal's yellow tiger =

Conservation status
- Endangered (IUCN 2.3)

Scientific classification
- Kingdom: Animalia
- Phylum: Arthropoda
- Clade: Pancrustacea
- Class: Insecta
- Order: Lepidoptera
- Family: Nymphalidae
- Genus: Parantica
- Species: P. kuekenthali

Binomial name
- Parantica kuekenthali (Pagenstecher, 1896)

Species of butterfly

Kuekenthal's yellow tiger (Parantica kuekenthali) is a species of nymphalid butterfly in the Danainae subfamily. It is endemic to Indonesia.

== Sources ==
- Lepidoptera Specialist Group (1996). "Parantica kuekenthali". IUCN Red List of Threatened Species. 1996 e.T16147A5431475. doi:10.2305/IUCN.UK.1996.RLTS.T16147A5431475.en.
