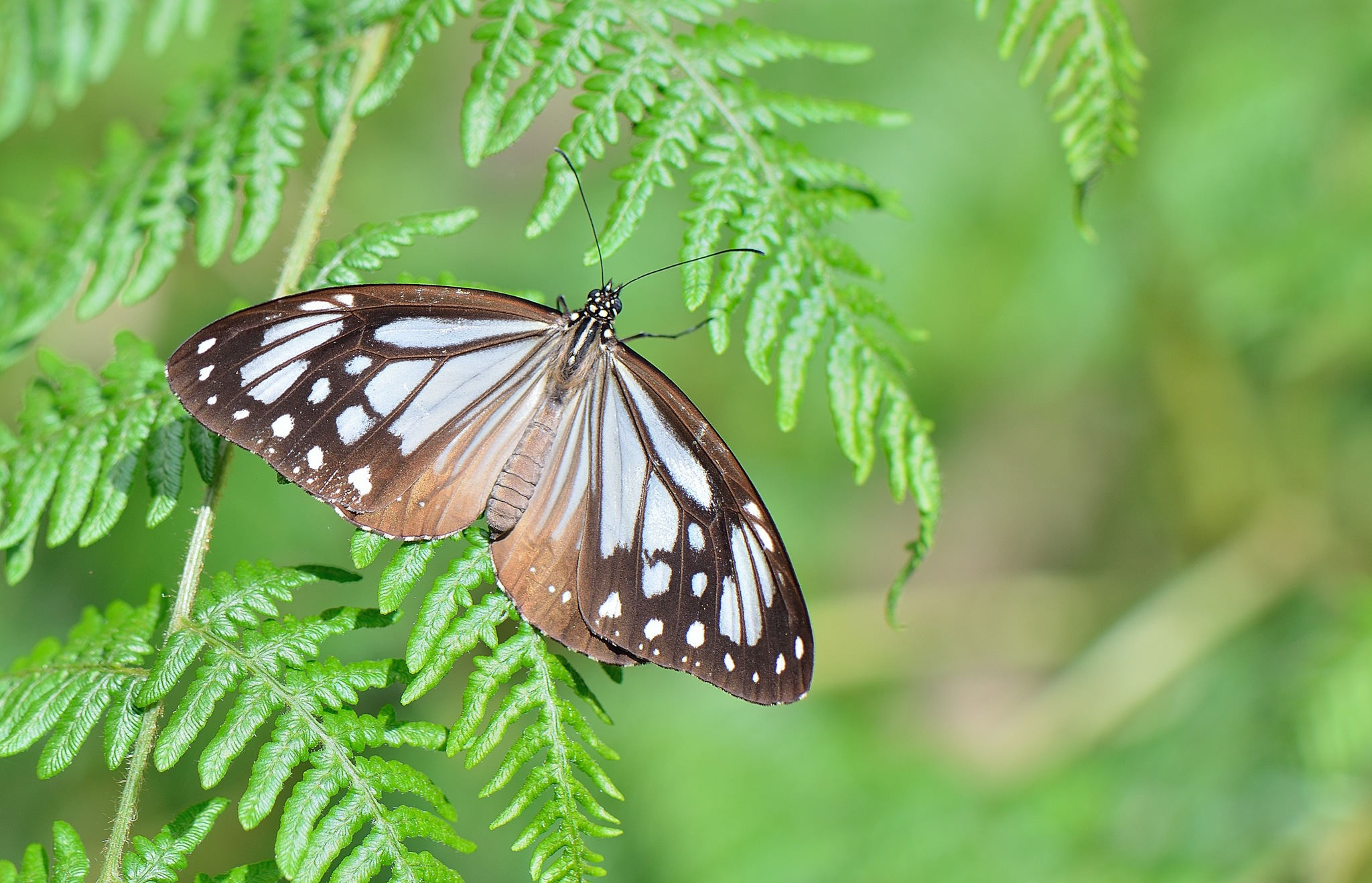

Conservation status
- Near Threatened (IUCN 2.3)

Scientific classification
- Kingdom: Animalia
- Phylum: Arthropoda
- Clade: Pancrustacea
- Class: Insecta
- Order: Lepidoptera
- Family: Nymphalidae
- Genus: Parantica
- Species: P. albata

Binomial name
- Parantica albata (Zinken, 1831)

= Zinken's tiger =

Species of butterfly

Zinken's tiger (Parantica albata) is a species of nymphalid butterfly, endemic to Indonesia.
