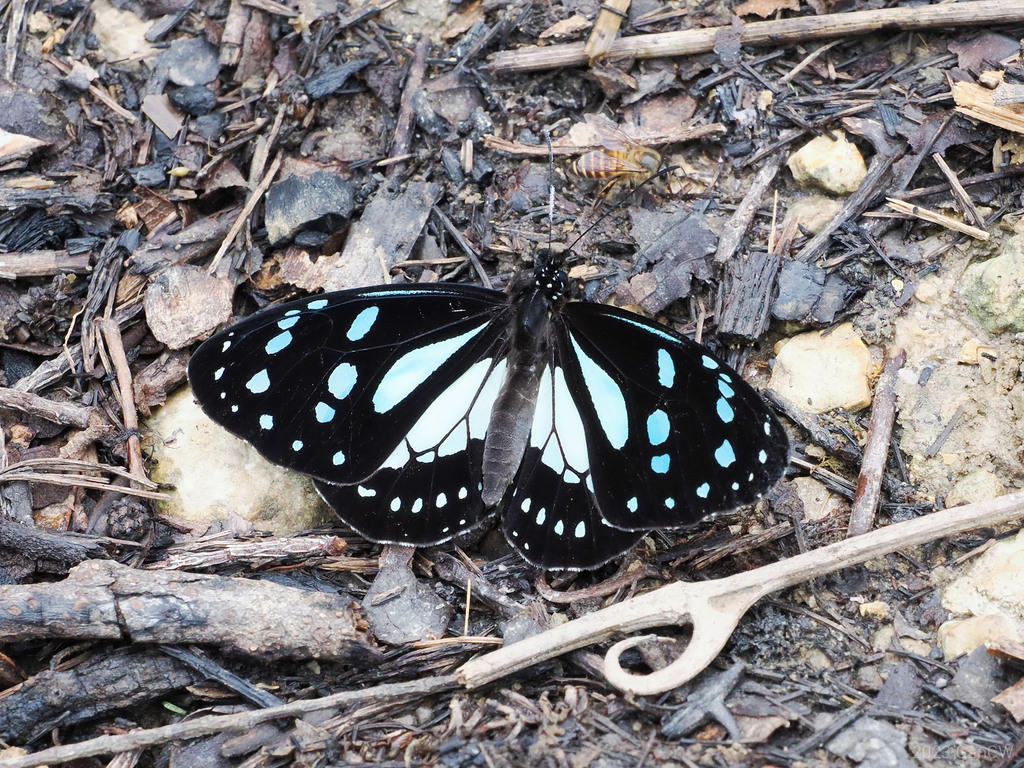

Conservation status
- Least Concern (IUCN 2.3)

Scientific classification
- Kingdom: Animalia
- Phylum: Arthropoda
- Clade: Pancrustacea
- Class: Insecta
- Order: Lepidoptera
- Family: Nymphalidae
- Genus: Parantica
- Species: P. weiskei

Binomial name
- Parantica weiskei (Rothschild, 1901)

= Weiske's tiger =

Species of butterfly

Weiske's tiger (Parantica weiskei) is a species of nymphalid butterfly in the Danainae subfamily. It is found in Indonesia and Papua New Guinea.
