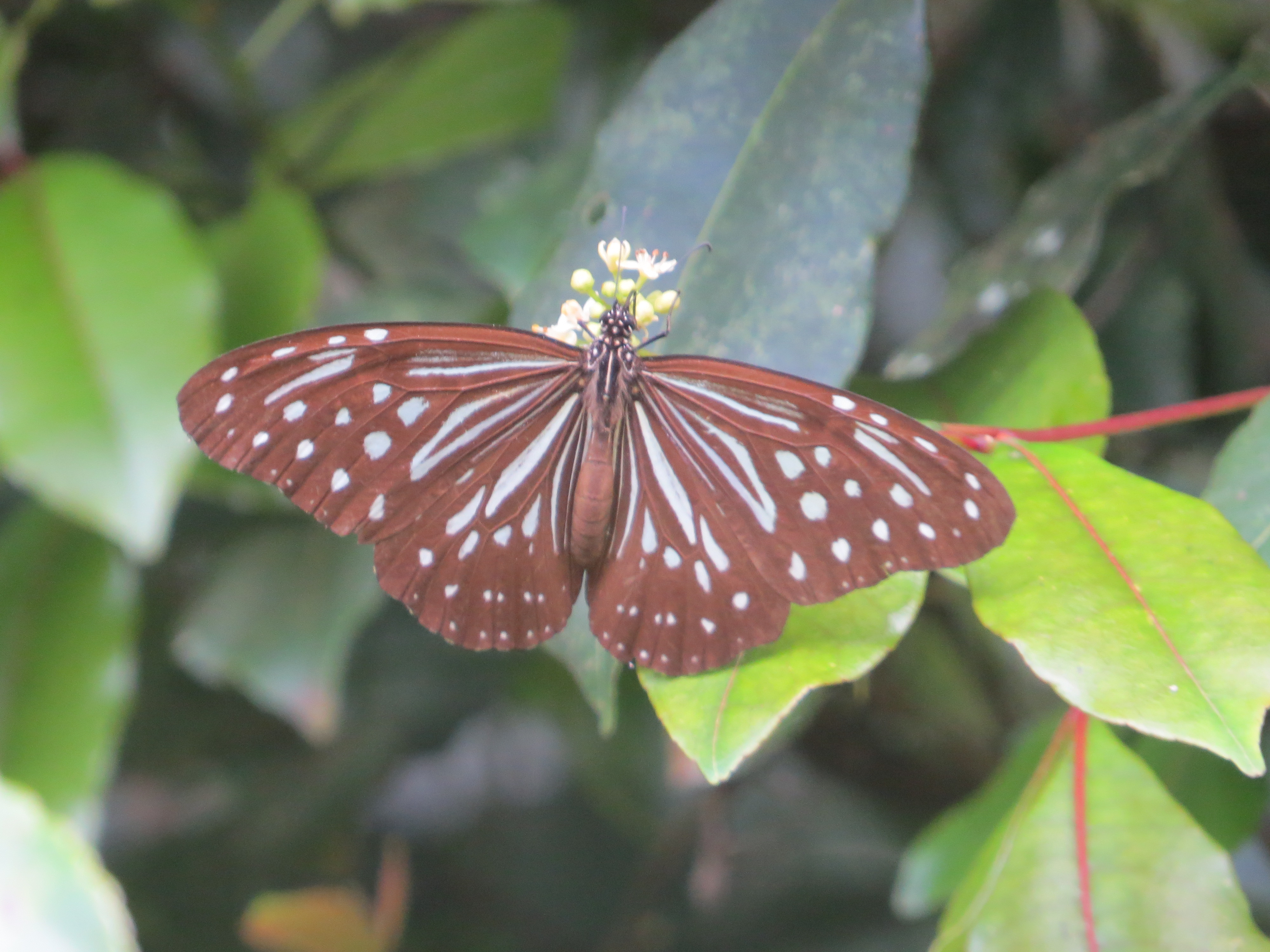

Conservation status
- Near Threatened (IUCN 2.3)

Scientific classification
- Kingdom: Animalia
- Phylum: Arthropoda
- Class: Insecta
- Order: Lepidoptera
- Family: Nymphalidae
- Genus: Parantica
- Species: P. nilgiriensis

Binomial name
- Parantica nilgiriensis (Moore, 1877)

Synonyms
- Danais nilgiriensis

= Parantica nilgiriensis =

Nilgiri tiger

Species of butterfly

Parantica nilgiriensis, the Nilgiri tiger, is a butterfly found in the Western Ghats of India south of the Konkan. It belongs to the danaid group of the brush-footed butterflies family.

Parantica nilgiriensis is a near-threatened (IUCN 2.3), butterfly endemic to the high altitudes of the Western Ghats of southern India, belonging to the family Nymphalidae and sub-family Danainae. It is restricted to the shola forests, south of Nilgiri Hills, in the temperate zones of the mountains, above 1500 m, though the species occasionally shows up in home gardens and open country to visit flowering plants. It rarely flies as low as 1000 m (Larsen 1987). Though Mark Alexander Wynter-Blyth (1957) mentions it as a common species, it has seen a rapid decline in the density of its population over the last few decades, owing to rapid destruction of its habitats, mostly due to tea-monocultures in the mountain ranges.

Species that closely resemble P. nilgiriensis are P. fumata (Butler), a Sri Lankan endemic and P. aglea (Stoll), a common species of low elevations of India, Sri Lanka and other south East Asian countries.

== Behaviour ==
Egg-laying behaviour: The adult female flies continuously around healthy host plants, occasionally stopping to lay eggs on suitable fresh leaves. It fixes itself on the edge of the leaf using its forelegs, maintaining slow wing beats to keep it alighted, slowly bends its abdomen downwards to lay the egg on the underside of the leaf. It lays several eggs in a session, laid singly, at times with two or more eggs on a single leaf, always maintaining some distance between individual eggs.

Adult behaviour: "The flight is rapid, low and erratic for a Danaid, giving the impression that it may not be protected species. It is often seen in numbers on flowering trees or on the occasional Lantana in clearings in Sholas. From time to time it is also met with sipping moisture from water seepages in vertical banks in the forest or along clear brooks, something that may also be observed in other montane butterflies."

Host plants: Tylophora tenuis and T. indica. It does not seem to feed on Calotropis sp. which its close cousin P. aglea feeds on.

== Description ==
"Upperside fuliginous black with bluish-white markings and spots. Forewing; two streaks in interspace 1, coalescent at base and generally at their apices, a narrow streak, with two faintly indicated streaks above it, in cell; five discal spots and above them a long streak in interspace 5; a shorter one in 6; some coastal spots and subterminal and terminal series of spots, the former series curved inwards opposite apex of wing, the four lower spots conspicuously larger than the others; the latter series incomplete, the spots small. Hind wing: interspaces la, lb, and 1 with narrow streaks, double in the last; the cell with a much broader, outwardly bluntly pointed streak, and beyond this in the interspaces a radiating series of elongate spots with a sub terminal series of smaller spots and a terminal very incomplete series of dots. Underside similar, ground-colour browner, the spots more clearly defined. Antennae black; head and thorax black spotted with white; abdomen brownish above, dusky white below."

Wingspan: 80–90 mm. Both male and female are dull brownish black with dirty white markings above. The streaks are narrower and the spots smaller than those of P. aglea and T. limniace. The markings are much less extensive than the background. Cells are dark with a pale streak. Male has patch of scent scales on the hindwing [Wynter-Blyth 1957].

Eggs: Eggs are white, shiny, dome-shaped and ribbed.

Larva: Eggs hatches on the fourth or fifth day. The first instar is a small, pearly white caterpillar with a prominent black head and dark grey legs. It has small paired tubercles on second and twelfth segments, which are precursors of future tentacles. The second instar is larger and begins to show up purplish ground colour with white, oval and round spots similar to what is seen on the mature caterpillar. There are four longitudinal rows of round spots – two dorsal and two lateral rows on each side. All the spots in the lateral rows and those on the first two segments and the last three segments are yellow. There is a pair of small tentacles on the second segment and a pair of tubercles on the twelfth segment. In the third and fourth instars the basic morphology remains the same except that the caterpillar grows in length and thickness, the tentacles elongates and the white spots gradually turn yellow on all segments. The fifth instar is about 6–7 cm long with long, thin, black tentacles on second and twelfth segments, the first pair being longer. In this stage all the white spots of the four longitudinal rows have turned yellow, with dark purple ground colour. The other smaller spots and short streaks remain grayish white. The caterpillar takes 14–15 days to complete its growth before it prepares for pupation.

Larval behaviour: The first and second instars of the larva show the strange behaviour of 'silk diving' – the caterpillar simply falls down, when alarmed, and hangs on its own silk thread – a protective, predator-avoidance strategy shown by some of the Nymphalids but unknown in any of the danaids. As the caterpillar matures, however, they seldom show this behaviour. (There was no nipping of the midrib before feeding.)

Pupa: Pupa is green with shining silvery and black spots. It hangs freely from the underside of a leaf or twig, appearing very similar to that of plain tiger Danaus chrysippus. The duration of pupal stage is 11–12 days. The pupa begins to show up the pattern of the underlying wings on the eve of eclosion. It turns very dark, nearly black, on the night before hatching.

== Range ==
Habitat: Southern India; the Nilgiris; Malabar, and Travancore hills.

== See also ==
- Danainae
- Nymphalidae
- List of butterflies of India
- List of butterflies of India (Nymphalidae)
