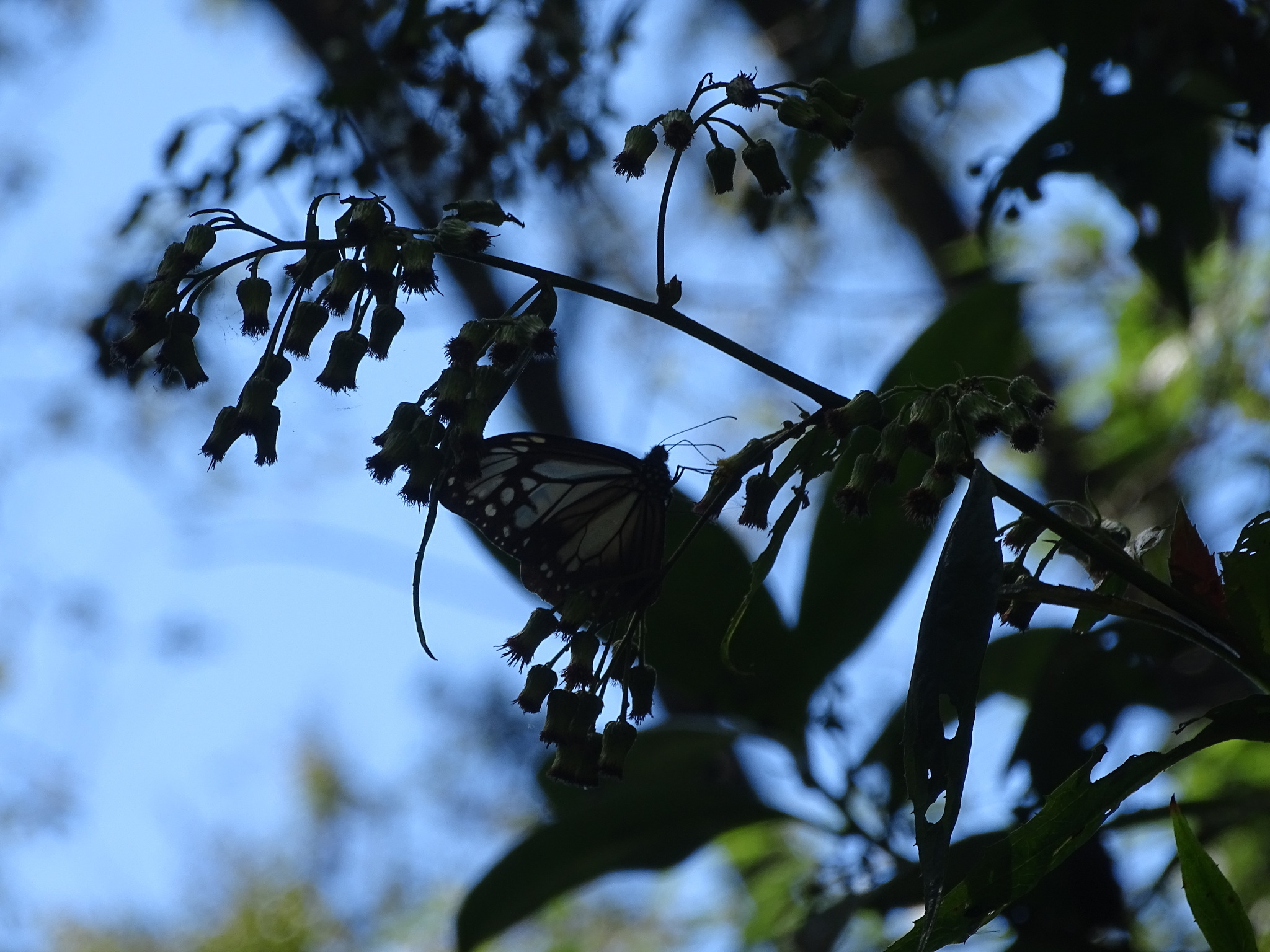

Conservation status
- Near Threatened (IUCN 2.3)

Scientific classification
- Kingdom: Animalia
- Phylum: Arthropoda
- Class: Insecta
- Order: Lepidoptera
- Family: Nymphalidae
- Genus: Parantica
- Species: P. pseudomelaneus

Binomial name
- Parantica pseudomelaneus (Moore, 1883)

= Parantica pseudomelaneus =

Species of butterfly

Parantica pseudomelaneus is a species of nymphalid butterfly in the subfamily Danainae. It is endemic to Indonesia.
