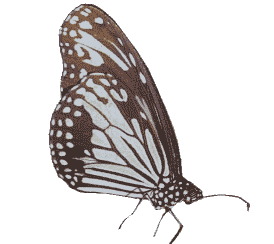
- Parantica aglea

Scientific classification
- Domain: Eukaryota
- Kingdom: Animalia
- Phylum: Arthropoda
- Class: Insecta
- Order: Lepidoptera
- Family: Nymphalidae
- Subtribe: Danaina
- Genus: Parantica; Moore, 1880

Species
- See text

Synonyms
- Chittira Moore, [1880]; Caduga Moore, 1882; Lintorata Moore, 1883; Ravadeba Moore, 1883; Bahora Moore, 1883; Phirdana Moore, 1883; Asthipa Moore, 1883; Mangalisa Moore, 1883; Caduga Moore, 1883; Badacara Moore, [1890]; Chlorochropsis Rothschild, 1892; Miriamica Vane-Wright, Boppré & Ackery, 2002

= Parantica =

Genus of brush-footed butterflies

Parantica, commonly called tigers, is an Old World genus of butterflies in subfamily Danainae of family Nymphalidae. They are found in southeastern Asia, Indonesia, Papua-New Guinea, and the Philippines. Many of these species are endemic to islands and considered endangered, vulnerable, or threatened according to the IUCN Red List. For other butterflies called tigers see the genus Danaus.

Parantica are large, slender, black and light blue or white butterflies. The body appears strikingly small and thin compared to the large wings.

== Species ==
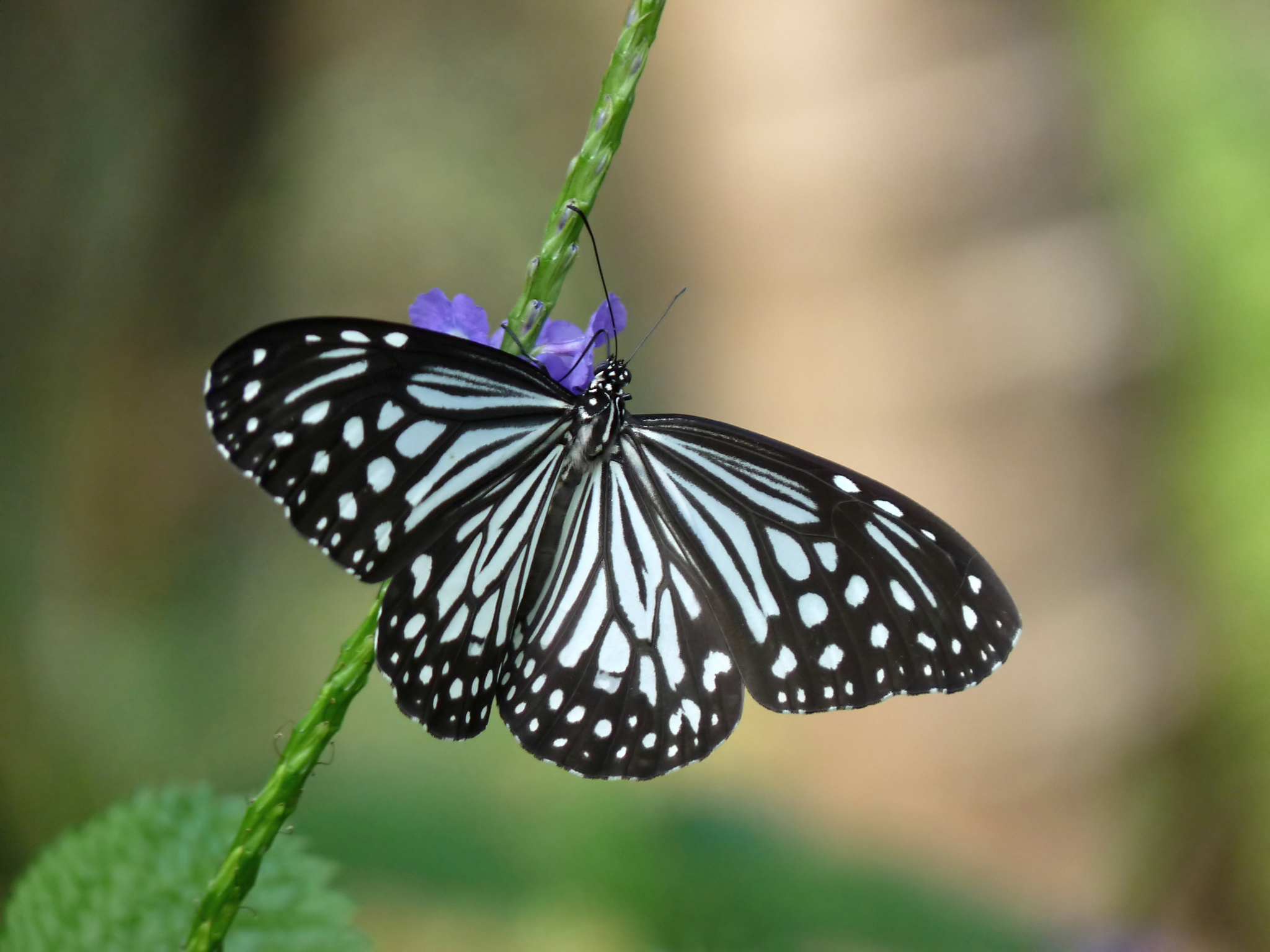
Parantica aglea

Species in alphabetical order:

- Parantica aglea (Stoll, 1782) – glassy (blue) tiger
- Parantica agleoides (C. & R. Felder, 1860) – dark glassy tiger
- Parantica albata (Zinken, 1831) – Zinken's tiger
- Parantica aspasia (Fabricius, 1787) – yellow glassy tiger

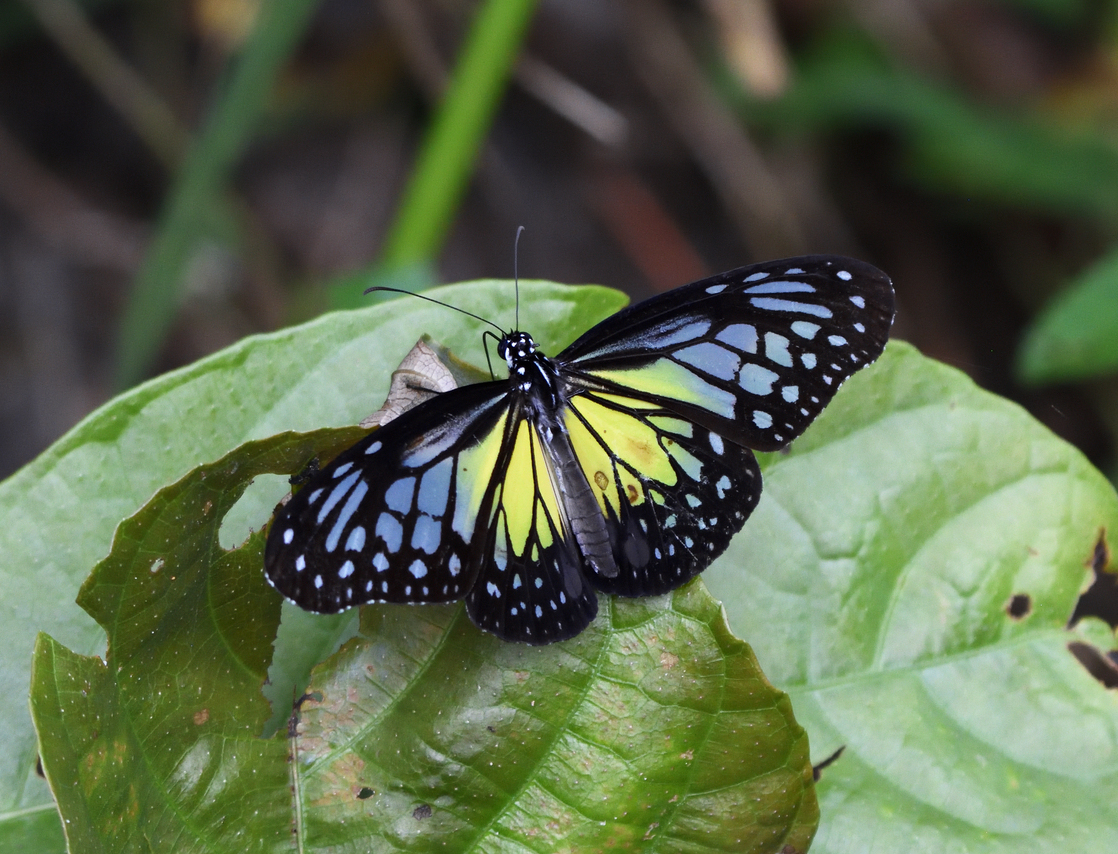
Parantica aspasia

- Parantica cleona (Stoll, 1782)
- Parantica clinias (Grose-Smith, 1890) – New Ireland yellow tiger
- Parantica crowleyi (Jenner Weir, 1894) – Crowley's tiger
- Parantica dabrerai (Miller & Miller, 1978) – D'Abrera's tiger
- Parantica dannatti (Talbot, 1936) – Dannatt's tiger
- Parantica davidi (Schröder, 1976) – David's tiger
- Parantica fuscela (Parsons, 1989)
- Parantica garamantis (Godman & Salvin, 1888) – angled tiger
- Parantica hypowattan (Morishita, 1981) – Morishita's tiger
- Parantica kirbyi (Grose-Smith, 1894) – Kirby's tiger
- Parantica kuekenthali (Pagenstecher, 1896) – Kuekenthal's yellow tiger
- Parantica luzonensis (C. & R. Felder, 1863)
- Parantica marcia (Joicey & Talbot, 1916) – Biak tiger
- Parantica menadensis (Moore, 1883) – Manado tiger
- Parantica melaneus (Cramer, 1775) – chocolate tiger
- Parantica melusine (Grose-Smith, 1894)
- Parantica milagros (Schröder & Treadaway, 1880) – Milagros' tiger
- Parantica nilgiriensis (Moore, 1877) – Nilgiri tiger
- Parantica pedonga (Fujioka, 1970)
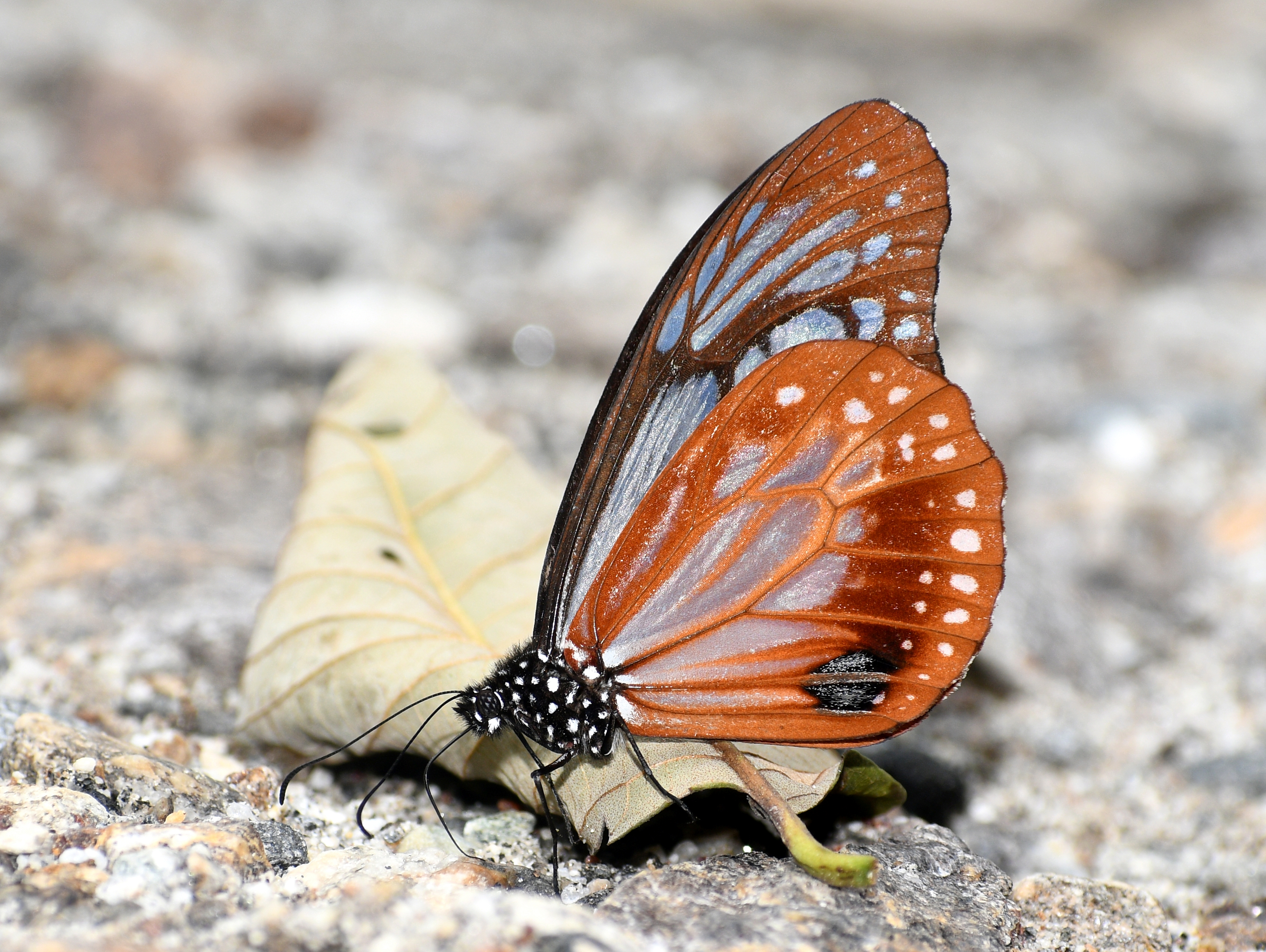
  Parantica pedonga
- Parantica philo (Grose-Smith, 1895) – Sumbawa tiger
- Parantica phyle (C. & R. Felder, 1863) – Felder's tiger
- Parantica pseudomelaneus (Moore, 1883) – Javan tiger
- Parantica pumila (Boisduval, 1859) – least tiger
- Parantica rotundata (Grose-Smith, 1890) – fat tiger
- Parantica schenkii (Koch, 1865)
- Parantica schoenigi (Jumalon, 1971) – Father Schoenig's chocolate
- Parantica sita (Kollar, 1844) – chestnut tiger

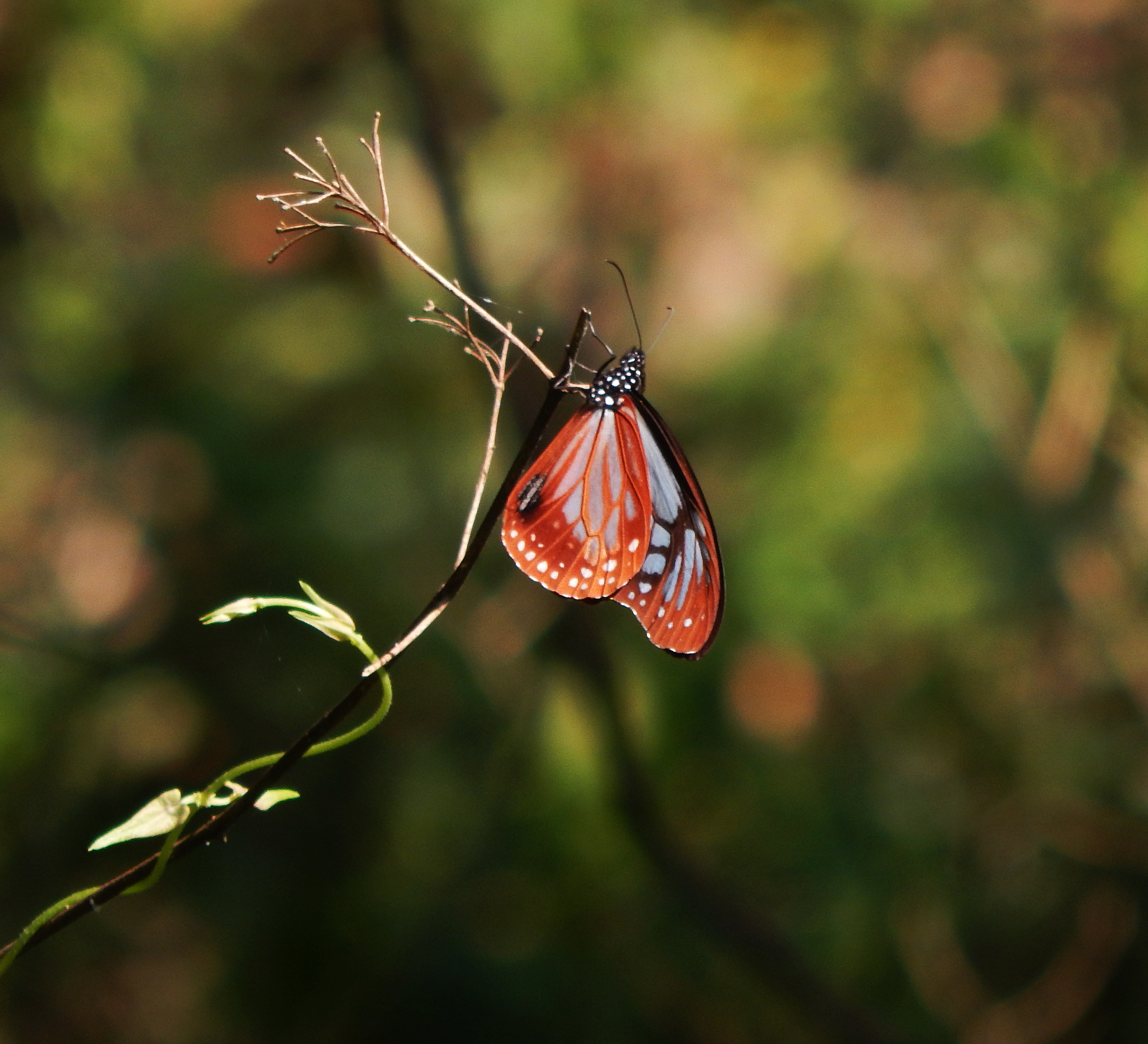
Parantica sita

- Parantica sulewattan (Fruhstorfer, 1896) – Bonthain tiger
- Parantica swinhoei (Moore, 1883) – Swinhoe's chocolate tiger

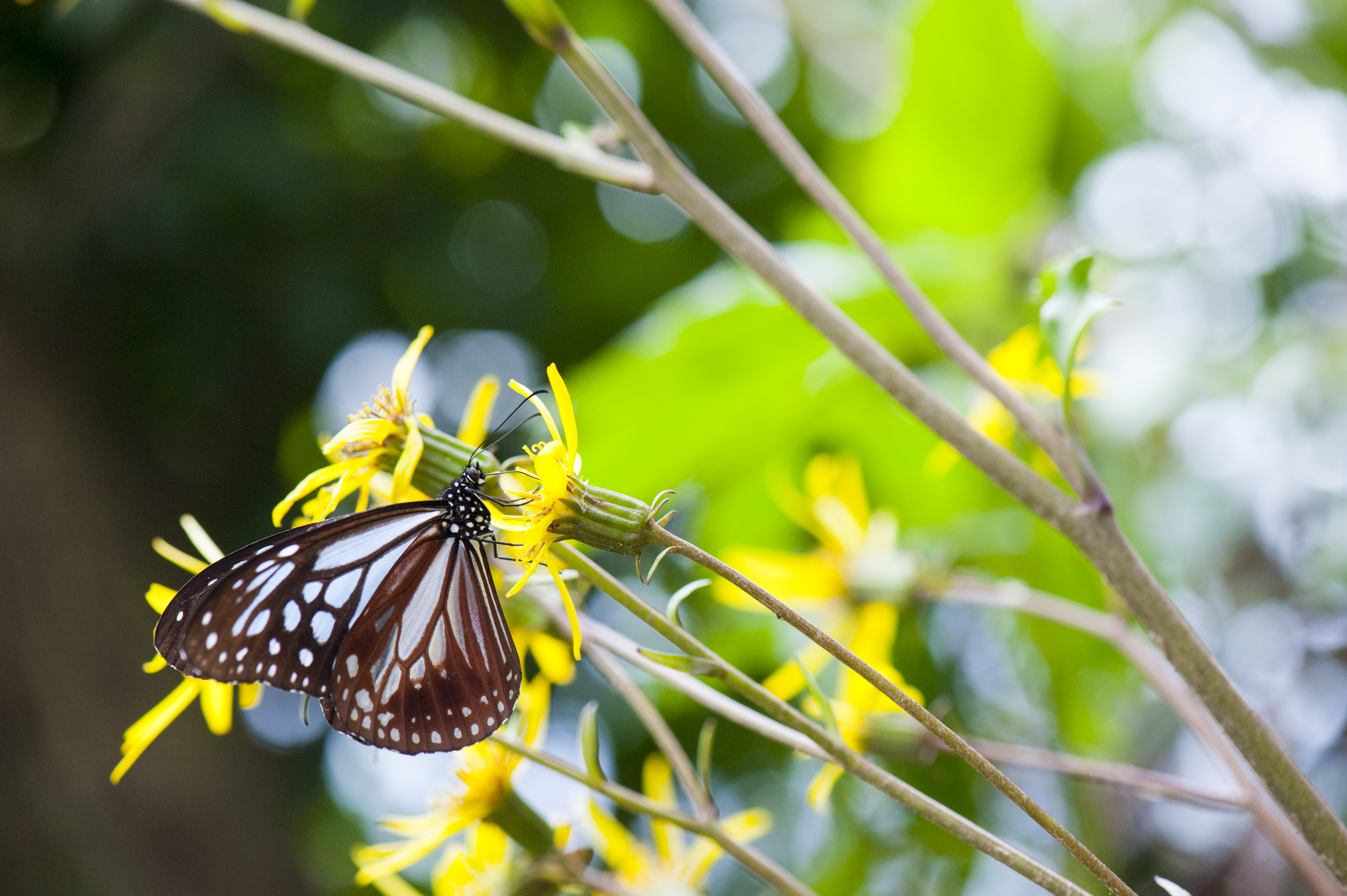
Parantica swinhoei

- Parantica taprobana (C. & R. Felder, 1865) – Ceylon tiger
- Parantica tityoides (Hagen, 1890) – Sumatran chocolate tiger
- Parantica timorica (Grose-Smith, 1887) – Timor yellow tiger
- Parantica toxopei (Nieuwenhuis, 1969) – Toxopeus' yellow tiger
- Parantica vitrina (C. & R. Felder, 1861) – Filipino glassy tiger
- Parantica wegneri (Nieuwenhuis, 1960) – Flores tiger
- Parantica weiskei (Rothschild, 1901) – Weiske's tiger

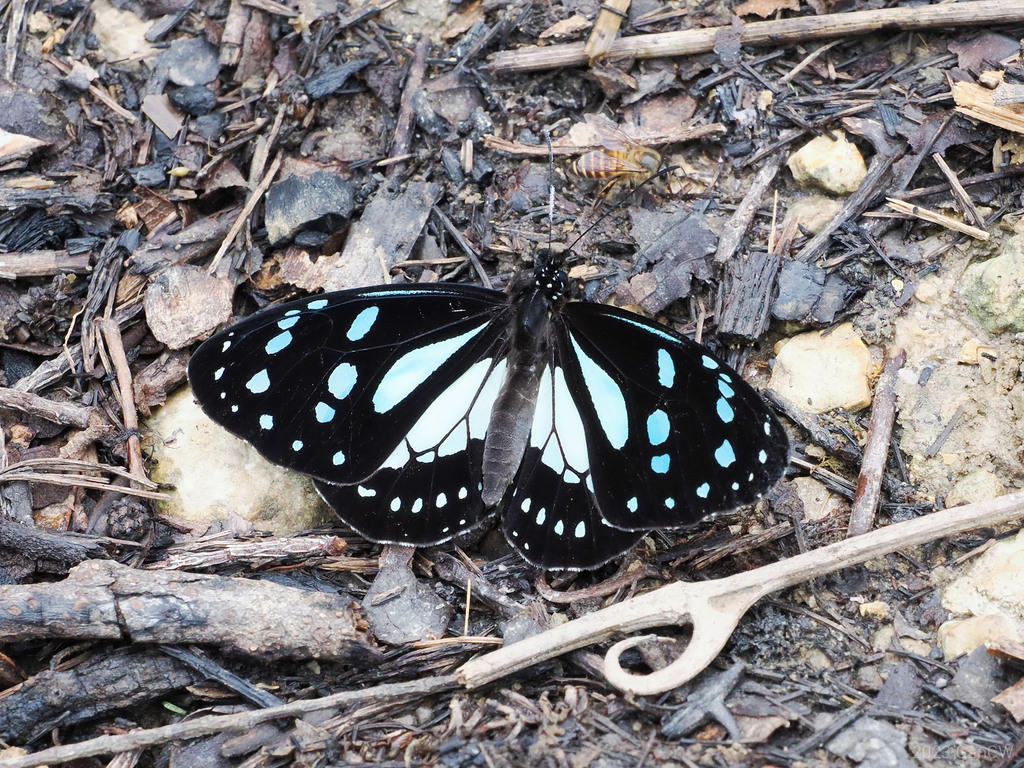
Parantica weiskei
