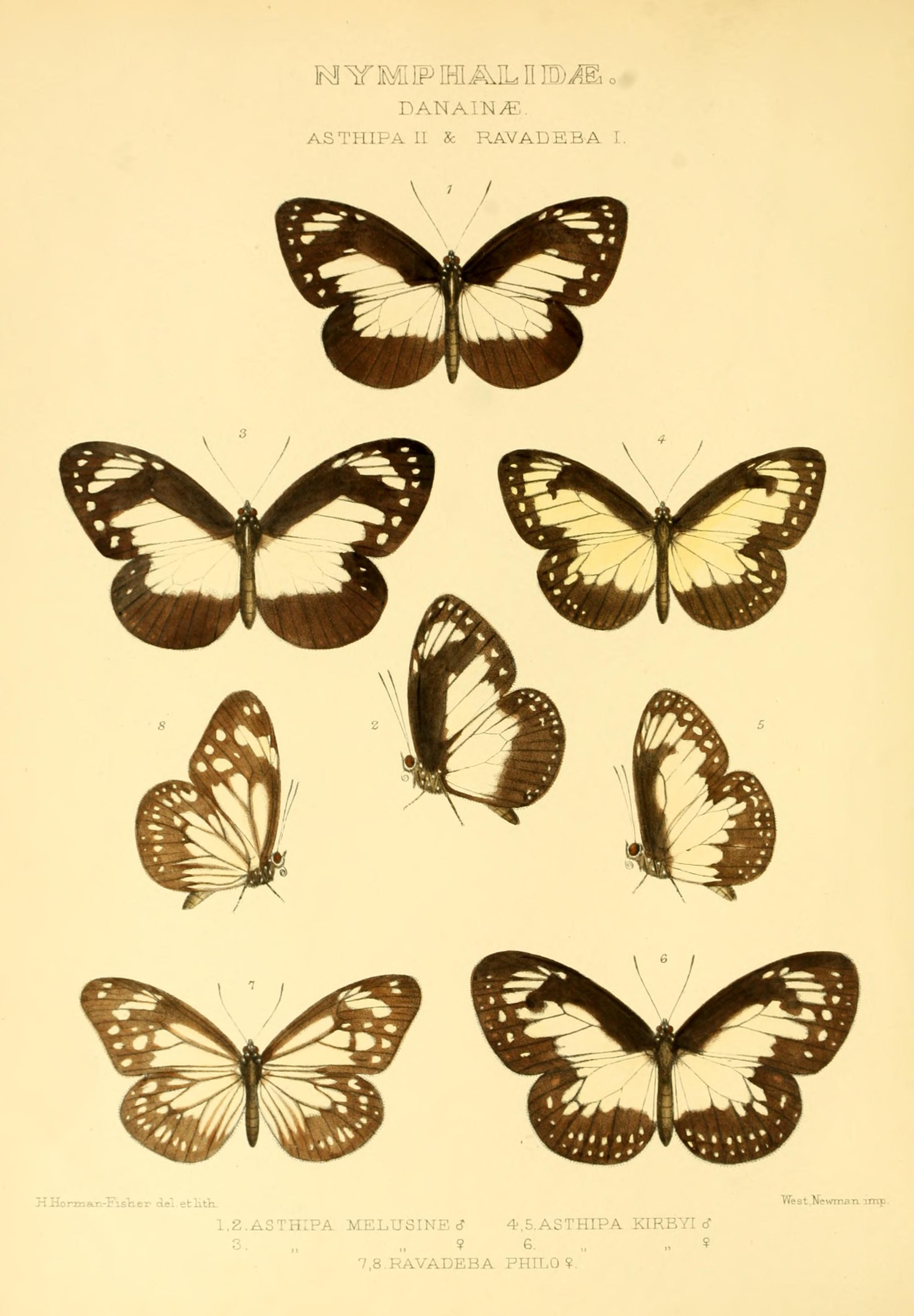
- Parantica philo figures 7, 8

Conservation status
- Vulnerable (IUCN 2.3)

Scientific classification
- Kingdom: Animalia
- Phylum: Arthropoda
- Clade: Pancrustacea
- Class: Insecta
- Order: Lepidoptera
- Family: Nymphalidae
- Genus: Parantica
- Species: P. philo

Binomial name
- Parantica philo (Grose-Smith, 1895)

= Sumbawa tiger =

Species of butterfly

The Sumbawa tiger (Parantica philo) is a species of nymphalid butterfly in the Danainae family. It is endemic to Indonesia.
