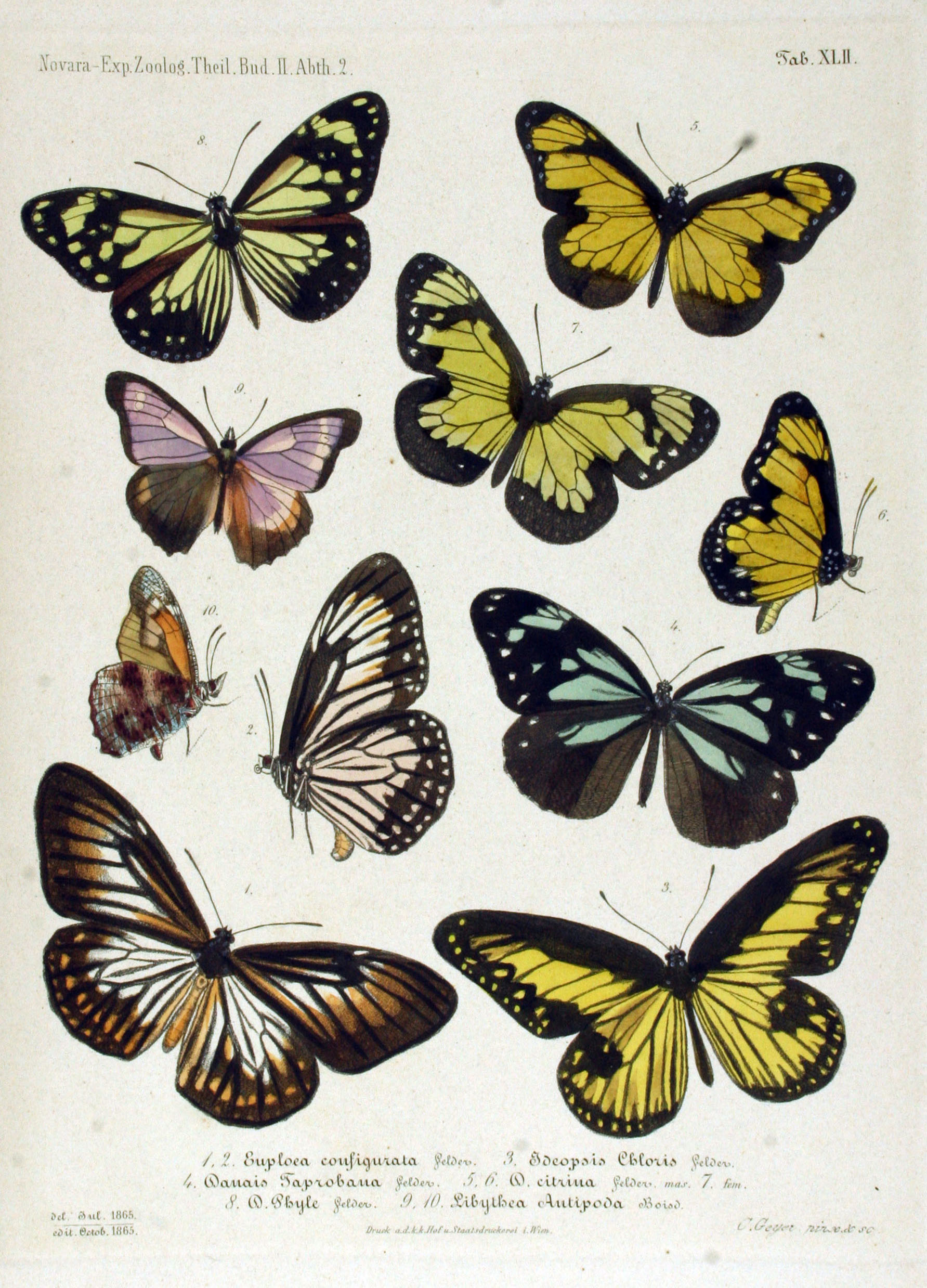
- Parantica phyle, labelled as Danais phyle is seen top left

Conservation status
- Vulnerable (IUCN 2.3)

Scientific classification
- Kingdom: Animalia
- Phylum: Arthropoda
- Clade: Pancrustacea
- Class: Insecta
- Order: Lepidoptera
- Family: Nymphalidae
- Genus: Parantica
- Species: P. phyle

Binomial name
- Parantica phyle (Felder & Felder, 1863)

= Felder's tiger =

Species of butterfly

The Felder's tiger (Parantica phyle) is a species of nymphalid butterfly in the Danainae subfamily. It is endemic to the Philippines.
