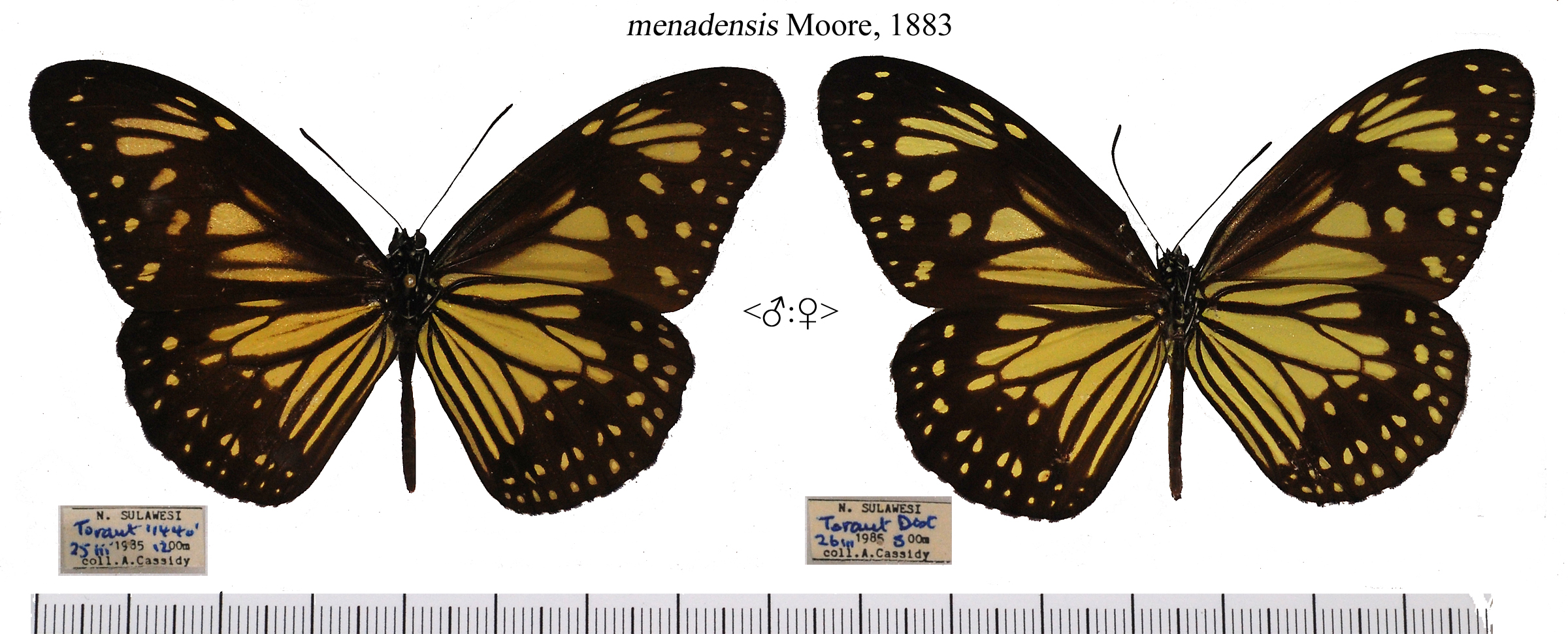

Conservation status
- Least Concern (IUCN 2.3)

Scientific classification
- Kingdom: Animalia
- Phylum: Arthropoda
- Clade: Pancrustacea
- Class: Insecta
- Order: Lepidoptera
- Family: Nymphalidae
- Genus: Parantica
- Species: P. menadensis

Binomial name
- Parantica menadensis (Moore, 1883)

= Manado yellow tiger =

Species of butterfly

The Manado yellow tiger (Parantica menadensis) is a species of nymphalid butterfly in the Danainae subfamily. It is endemic to Sulawesi, Indonesia.
