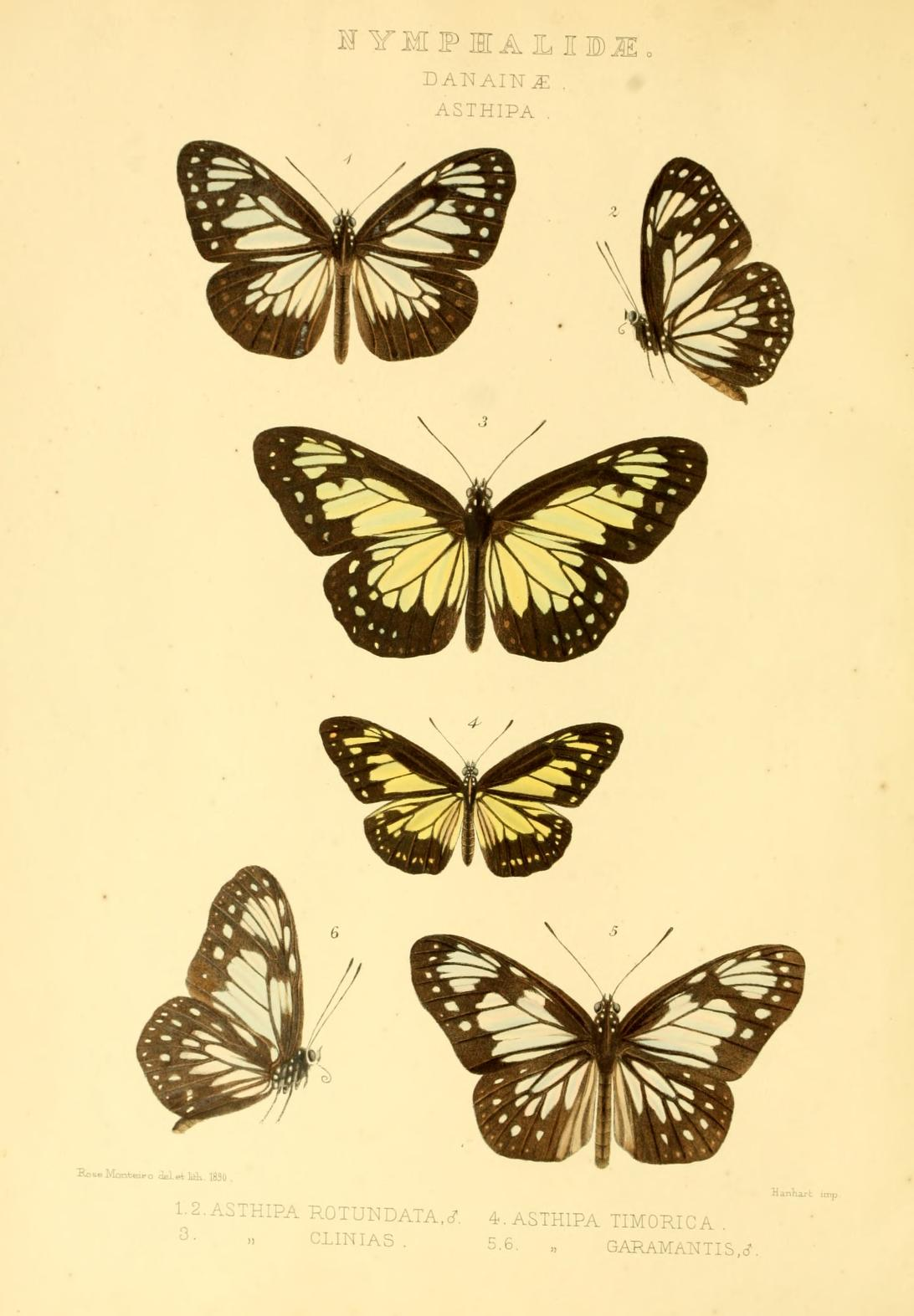
- Parantica garamantis figure 4

Conservation status
- Vulnerable (IUCN 2.3)

Scientific classification
- Kingdom: Animalia
- Phylum: Arthropoda
- Clade: Pancrustacea
- Class: Insecta
- Order: Lepidoptera
- Family: Nymphalidae
- Genus: Parantica
- Species: P. garamantis

Binomial name
- Parantica garamantis (Godman and Salvin, 1888)

= Angled tiger =

Species of butterfly

The angled tiger (Parantica garamantis) is a species of nymphalid butterfly in the Danainae subfamily. It is found in Papua New Guinea and the Solomon Islands.
