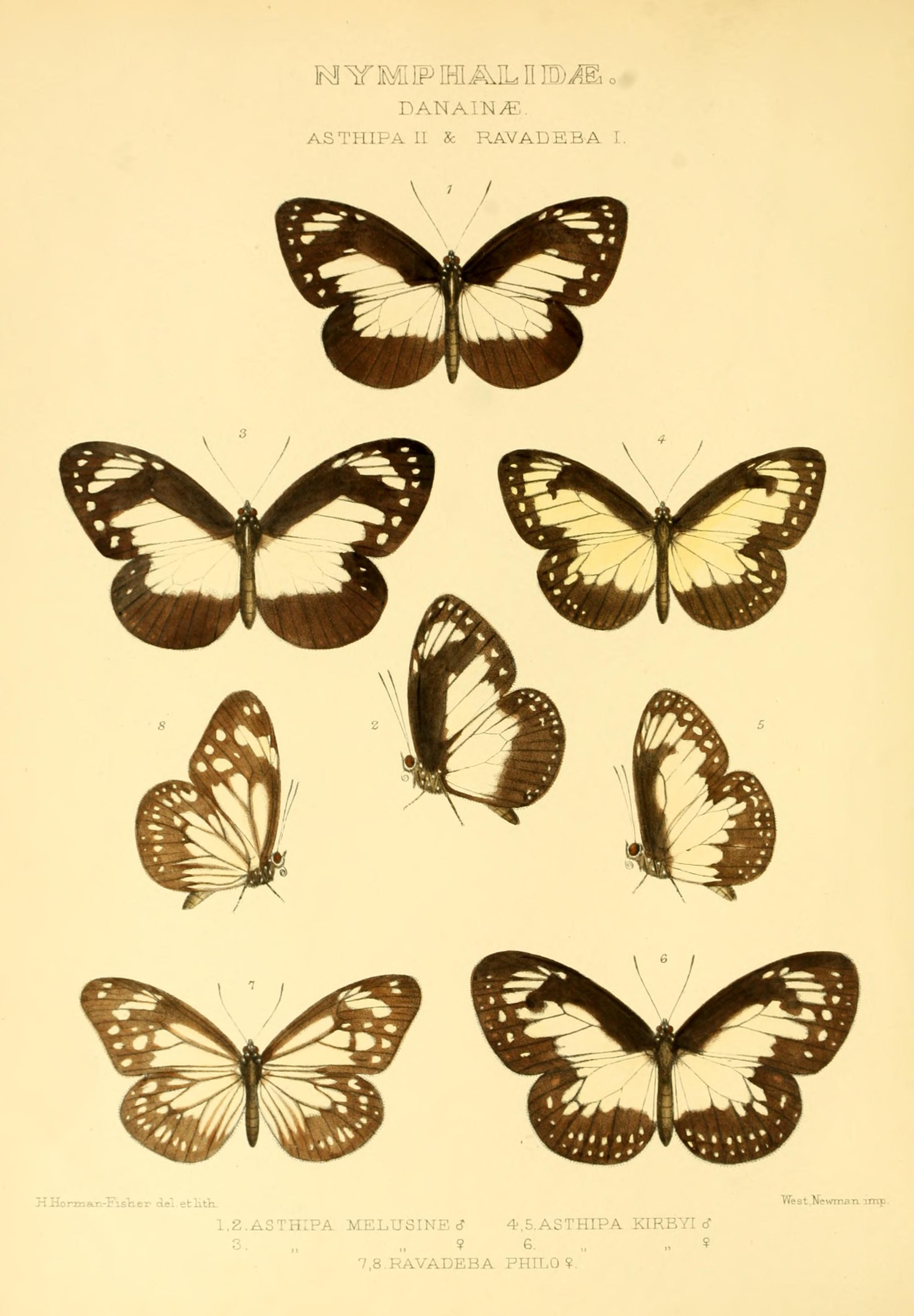
- Parantica kirbyi figures 4, 5 (male), 6 (female)

Conservation status
- Least Concern (IUCN 2.3)

Scientific classification
- Kingdom: Animalia
- Phylum: Arthropoda
- Clade: Pancrustacea
- Class: Insecta
- Order: Lepidoptera
- Family: Nymphalidae
- Genus: Parantica
- Species: P. kirbyi

Binomial name
- Parantica kirbyi (Grose-Smith, 1894)

= Kirby's tiger =

Species of butterfly

The Kirby's tiger (Parantica kirbyi) is a species of nymphalid butterfly in the Danainae subfamily. It is found in Indonesia and Papua New Guinea.

The name honours William Forsell Kirby.
