= Toxopeus' yellow tiger =

Conservation status
- Vulnerable (IUCN 2.3)

Scientific classification
- Kingdom: Animalia
- Phylum: Arthropoda
- Clade: Pancrustacea
- Class: Insecta
- Order: Lepidoptera
- Family: Nymphalidae
- Genus: Parantica
- Species: P. toxopei

Binomial name
- Parantica toxopei (Nieuwenhuis, 1969)

Species of butterfly

The Toxopeus' yellow tiger (Parantica toxopei) is a species of nymphalid butterfly in the Danainae family. It is endemic to Sulawesi, Indonesia.
