= Danais =

Danais may refer to

- Danais (epic), a lost ancient Greek epic
- Danais (mythology), women in Greek mythology
- Danais (hundred), a historic subdivision of Hertfordshire, England
- Danais (plant), a genus of Rubiaceae
- Natacha Danais (1977–1990), a victim of serial killer Michel Fourniret
