= Danais (epic) =

Lost ancient Greek epic poem

Danais (Ancient Greek: Δαναΐς) refers to a lost ancient Greek epic written by one of the cyclic poets. The Danaid tetralogy of Aeschylus undoubtedly draws its material from this particular literary work. Danais is represented in the table of epics in the received canon on the very fragmentary "Borgia table" as "Danaides".

The subject of the epic is the Danaïdes, the fifty daughters of Danaus, a king in Libya. A description of them preparing for a battle in Egypt (they were to be married off to fifty brothers, the children of Danaus's twin brother) is the only detail left of the poem.
