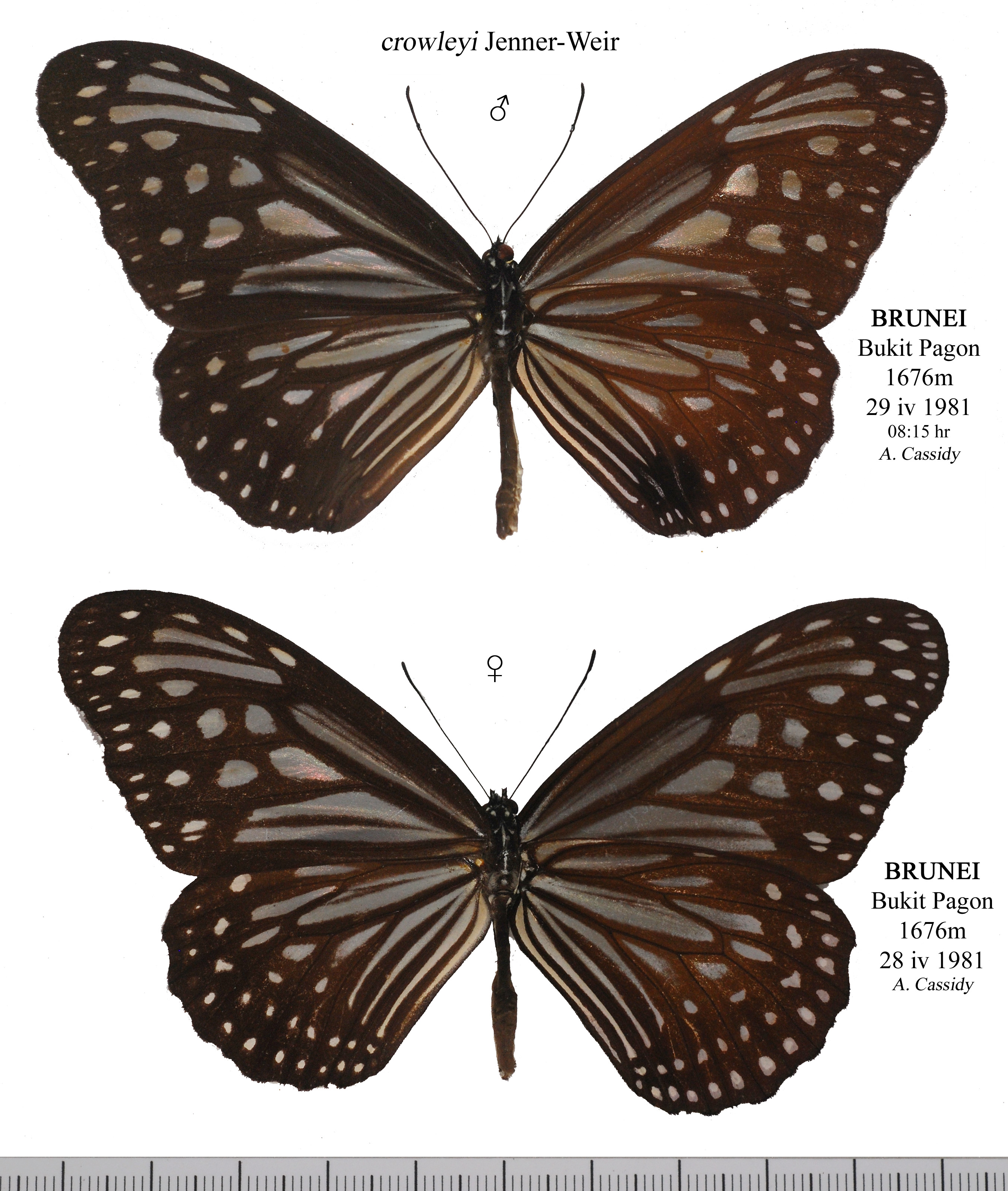

Conservation status
- Least Concern (IUCN 2.3)

Scientific classification
- Kingdom: Animalia
- Phylum: Arthropoda
- Clade: Pancrustacea
- Class: Insecta
- Order: Lepidoptera
- Family: Nymphalidae
- Genus: Parantica
- Species: P. crowleyi

Binomial name
- Parantica crowleyi (Jenner Weir, 1894)

= Crowley's tiger =

Species of butterfly

Crowley's tiger (Parantica crowleyi) is a species of nymphalid butterfly in the Danainae subfamily. It is found in Brunei, Indonesia, and Malaysia.
