= False fritillary =

False fritillaries are brush-footed butterflies which resemble the fritillaries of the Heliconiinae, and which belong to sister subfamilies of the Nymphalidae:

- the Caribbean genus Anetia of the Danainae, in particular:
  - Anetia pantheratus
  - Anetia briarea (lesser false fritillary)
- the monotypic African genus Pseudargynnis of the Limenitidinae
