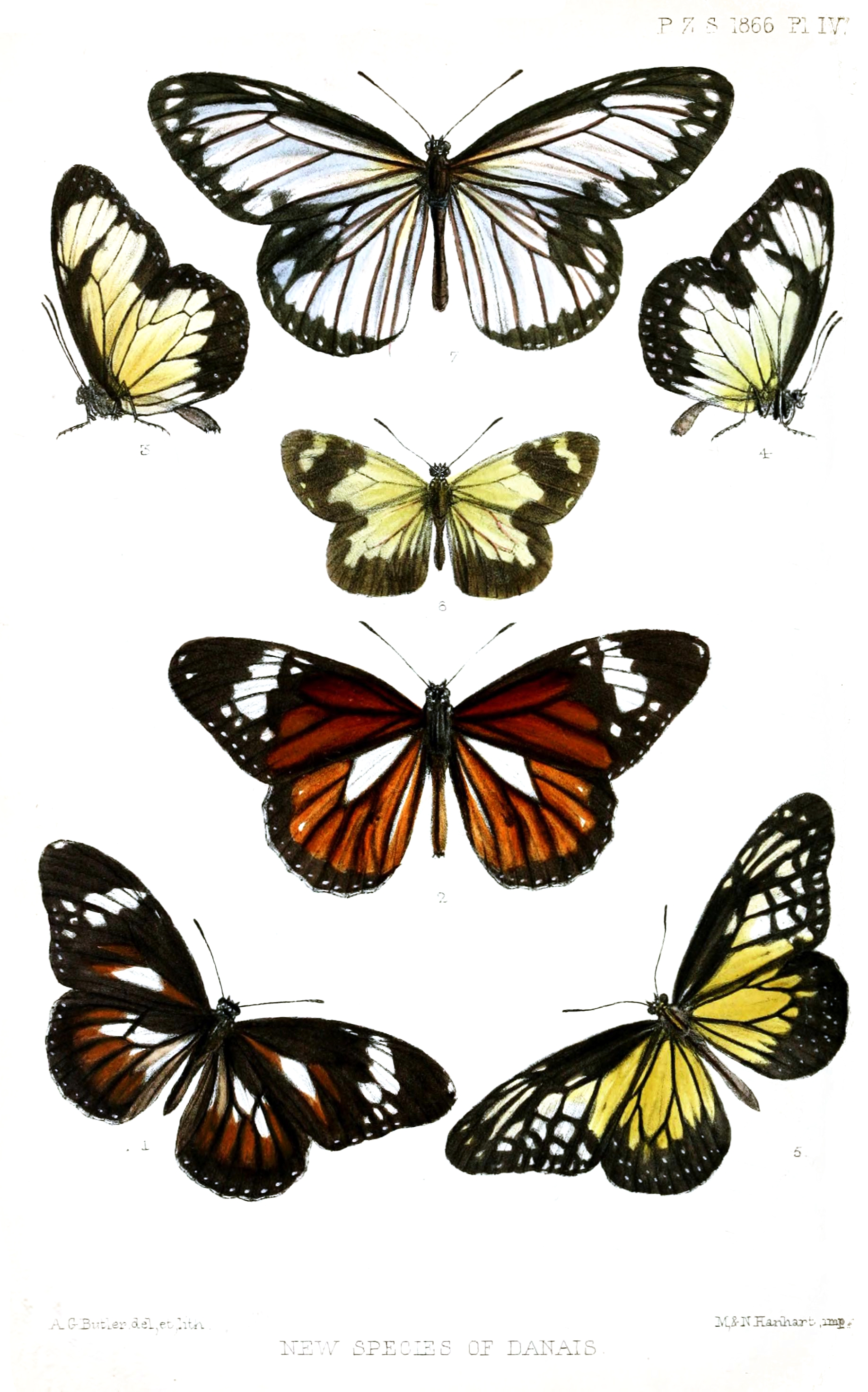
- "Tiger butterflies" of genera Ideopsis (top), Danaus (lower center/left) and Parantica (others)

Scientific classification
- Kingdom: Animalia
- Phylum: Arthropoda
- Clade: Pancrustacea
- Class: Insecta
- Order: Lepidoptera
- Family: Nymphalidae
- Subfamily: Danainae
- Tribe: Danaini; Boisduval, 1833

Diversity
- 2 subtribes, 11 extant genera

= Danaini =

Tribe of butterflies

The Danaini are a tribe of brush-footed butterflies (family Nymphalidae). The tribe's type genus Danaus contains the well-known monarch butterfly (D. plexippus) and is also the type genus of the tribe's subfamily, the milkweed butterflies (Danainae).

The Danaini do not have a fixed colloquial name for the entire tribe, but in particular for subtribe Danaina the term tiger butterflies is occasionally used in reference to the numerous species in several genera.

== Classification ==
Subtribe Danaina Boisduval, [1833]

- Amauris – clerics
- Danaus – monarchs, queens and tigers
- Ideopsis – glassy tigers, Southeast Asian tree- and wood-nymphs
- Parantica – tigers
- Tiradelphe – Schneider's surprise
- Tirumala – blue tigers

Subtribe Euploeina Moore, [1880]

- Anetia – anetias and false "fritillaries"
- Euploea – crows
- Idea – tree nymphs, paper butterflies
- Lycorea – mimic queens
- Protoploea – magpie butterfly

The fossil milkweed butterfly Archaeolycorea from the Oligocene or Miocene Tremembé Formation of Brazil is often assigned to this tribe, specifically the Euploeina. Whether this is correct is not entirely certain.

Examples of butterflies from several genera in tribe Danaini

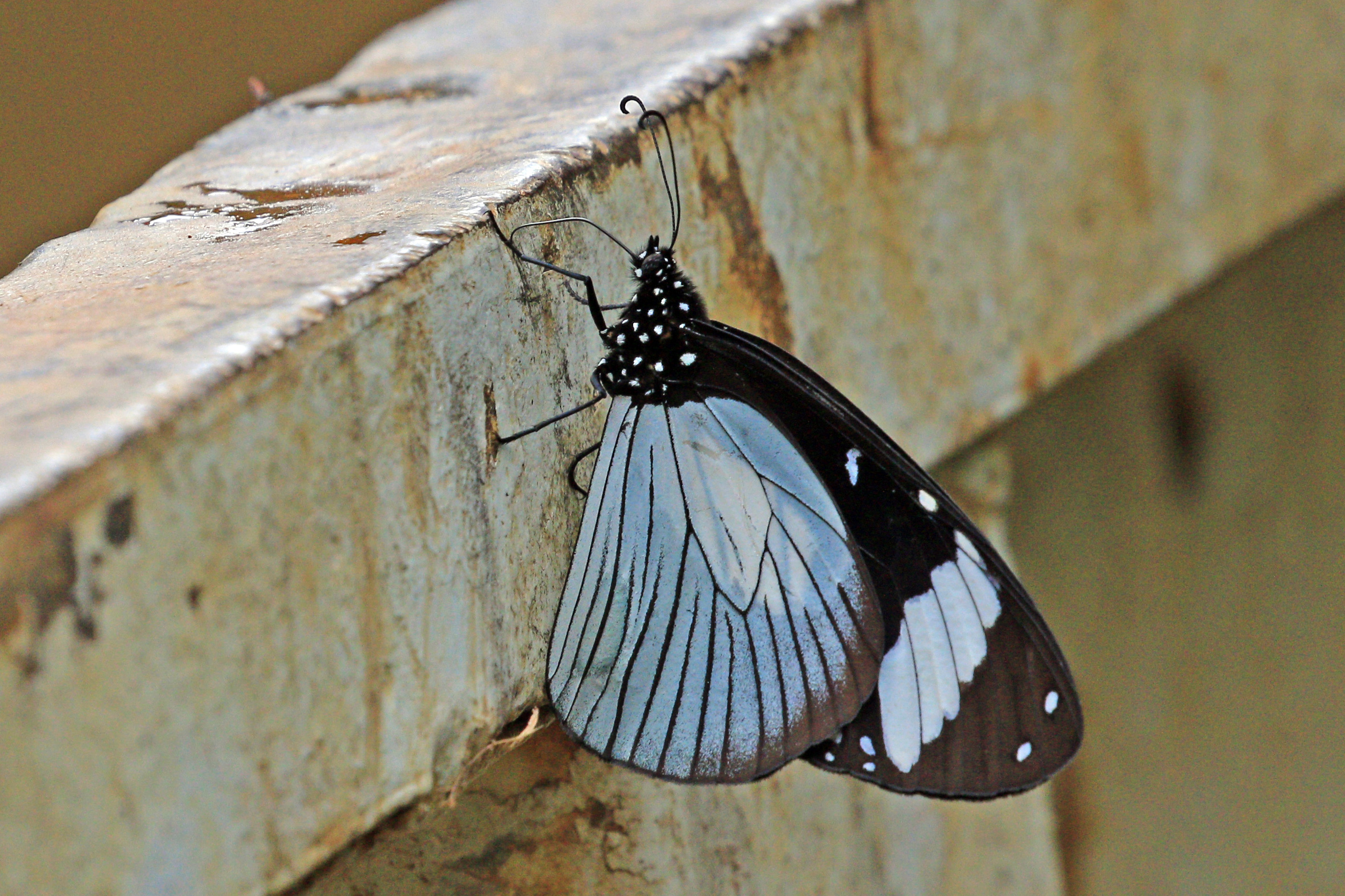
Friar, genus Amauris

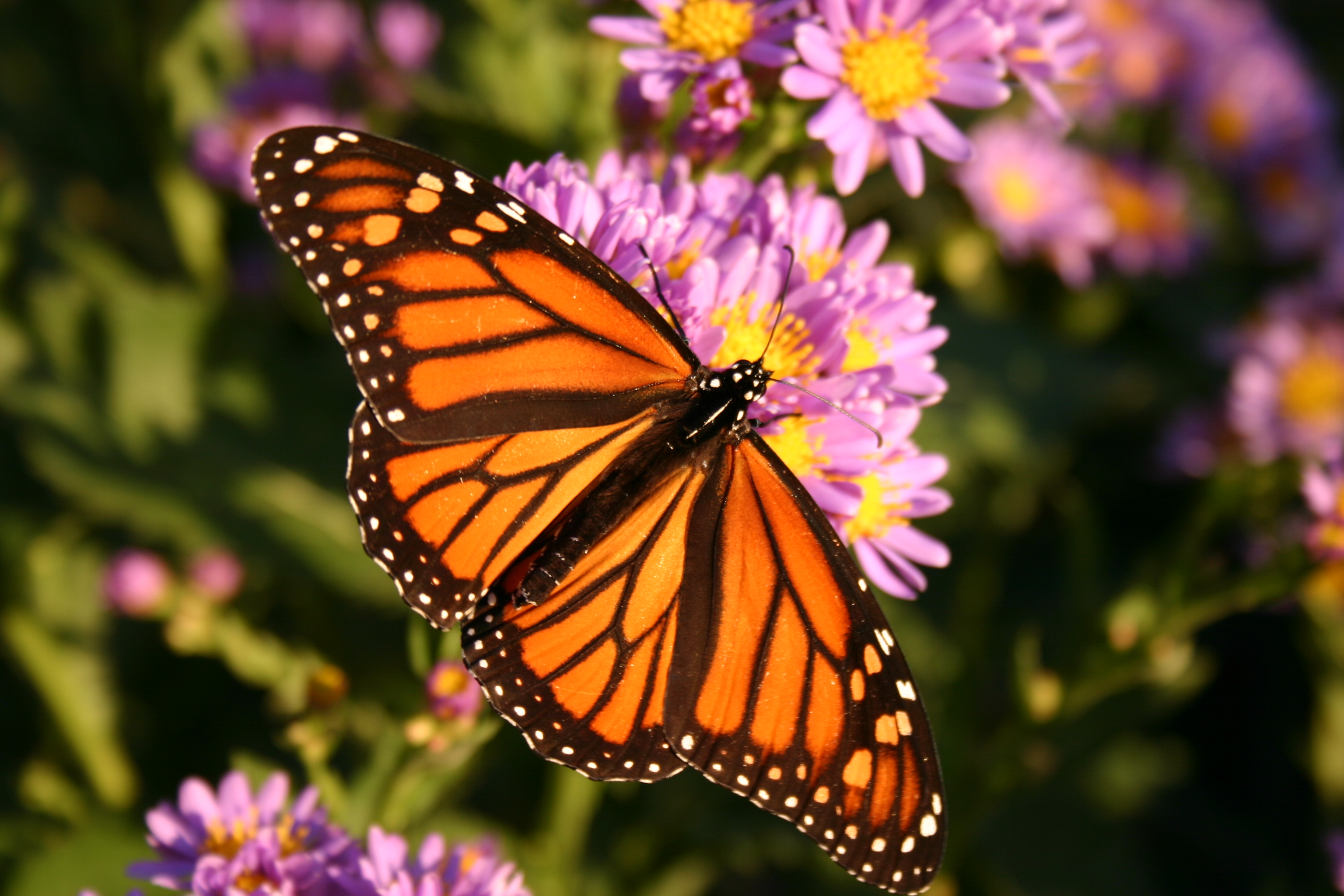
Monarch, genus Danaus

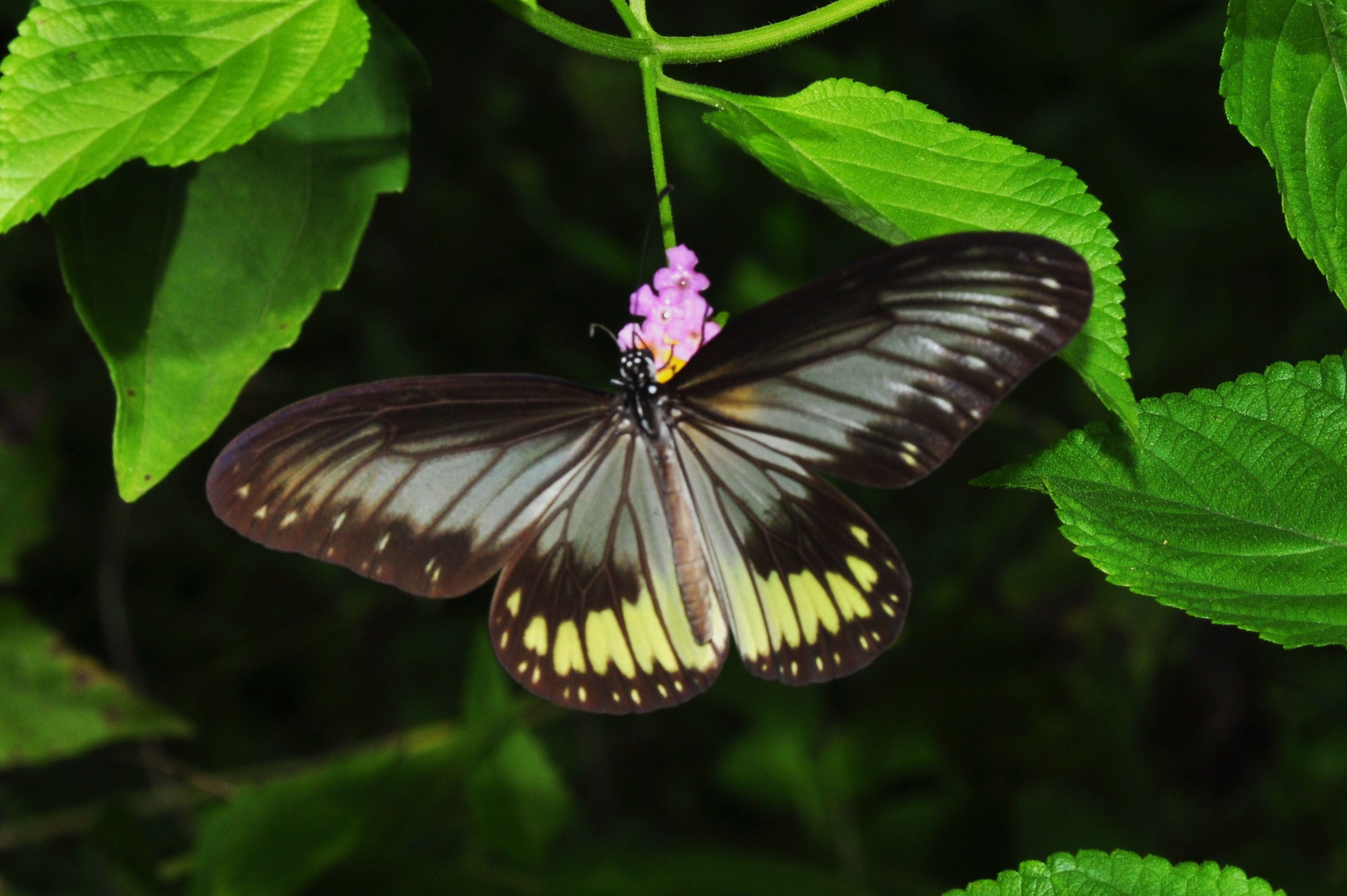
Wood nymph, genus Ideopsis

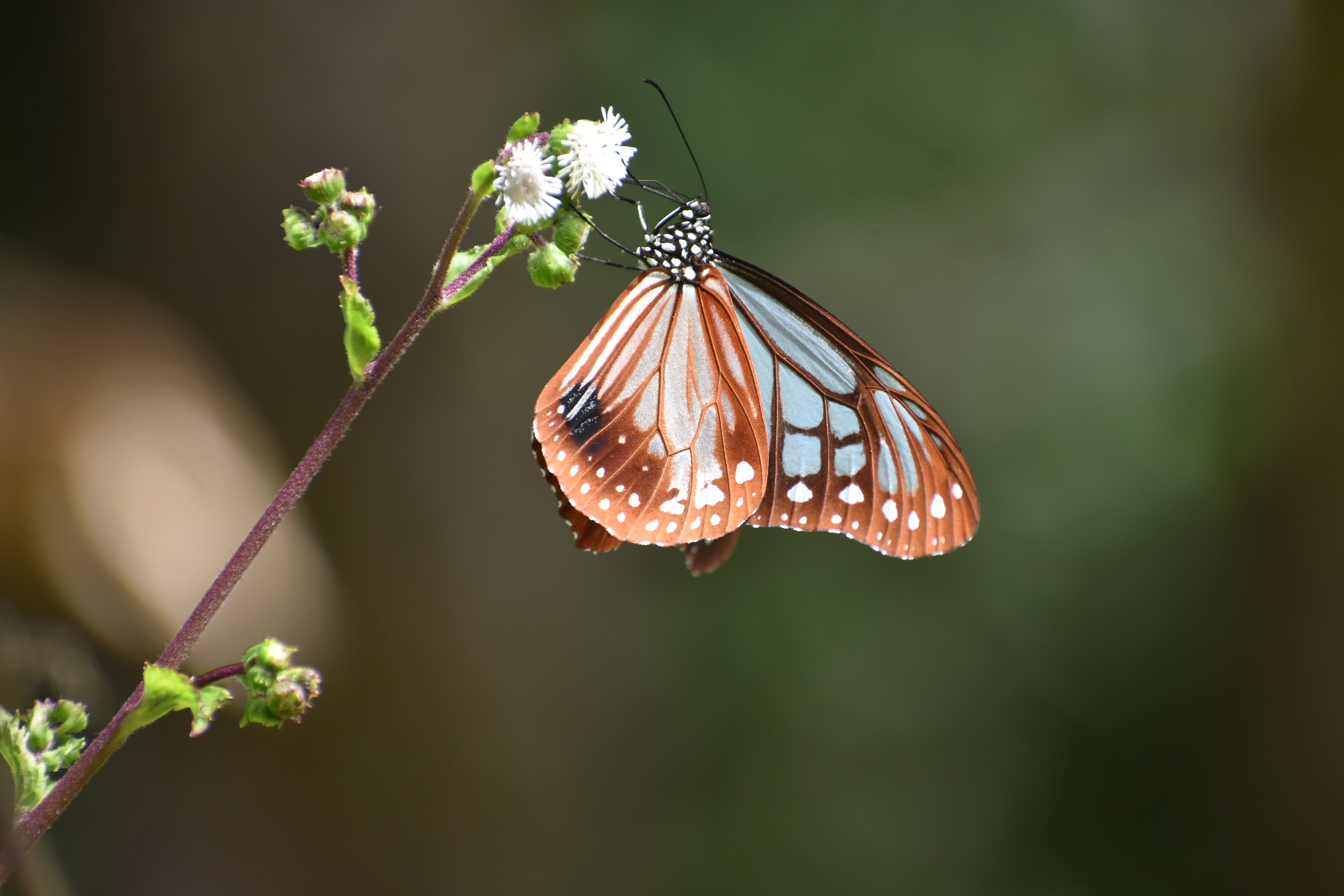
Chestnut tiger, genus Parantica

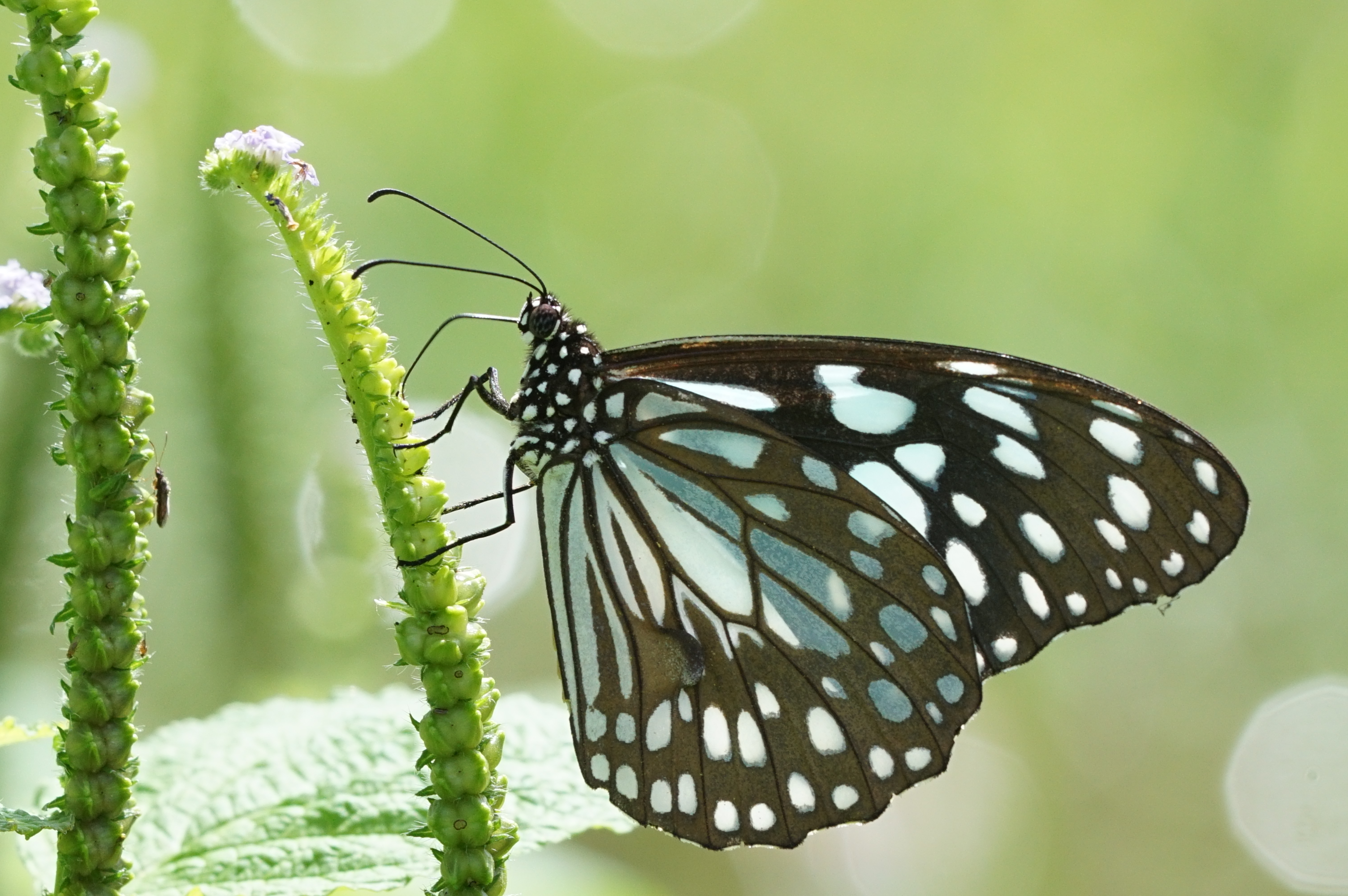
Blue tiger, genus Tirumala

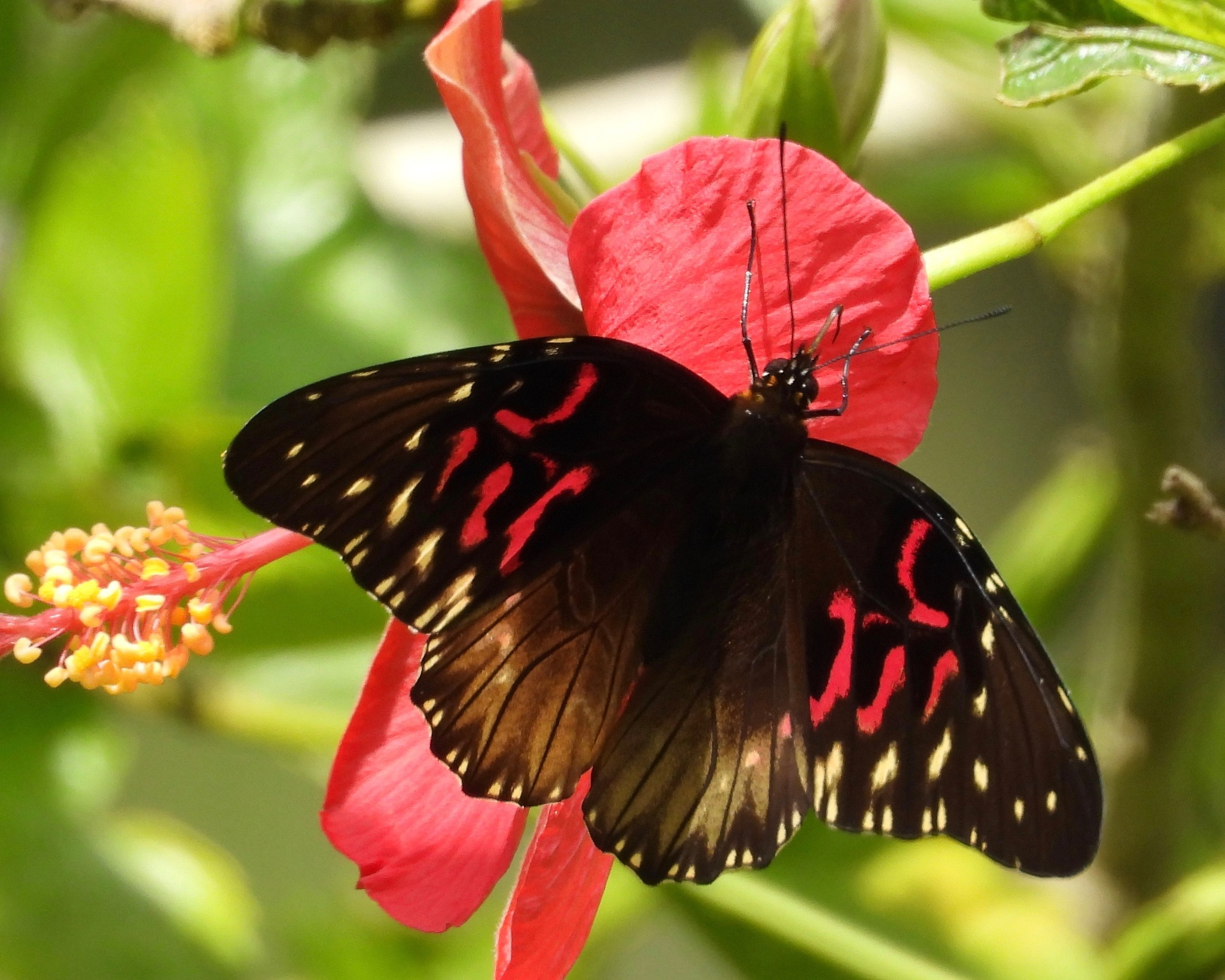
Cloud-forest monarch, genus Anetia

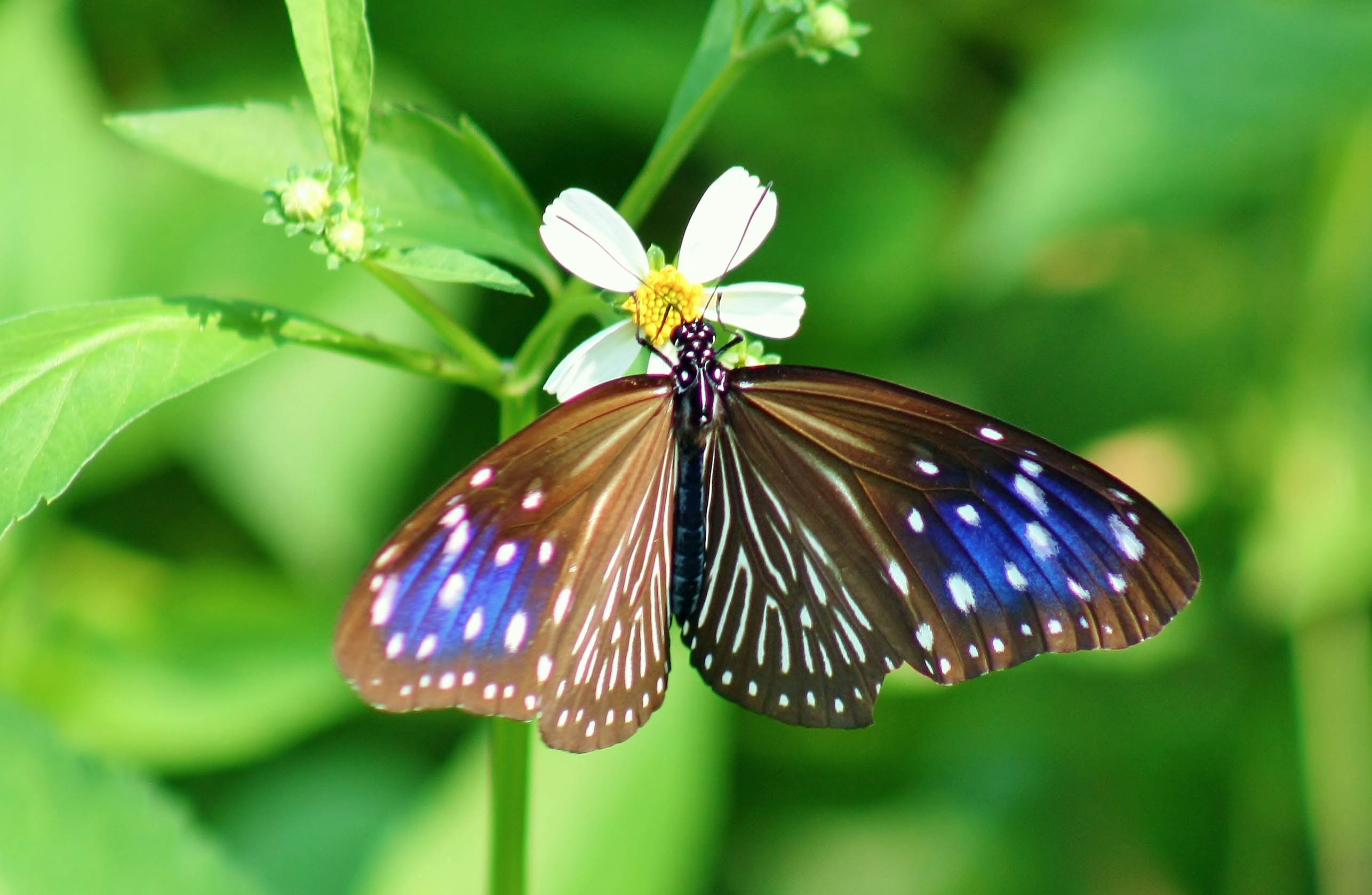
Striped blue crow, genus Euploea

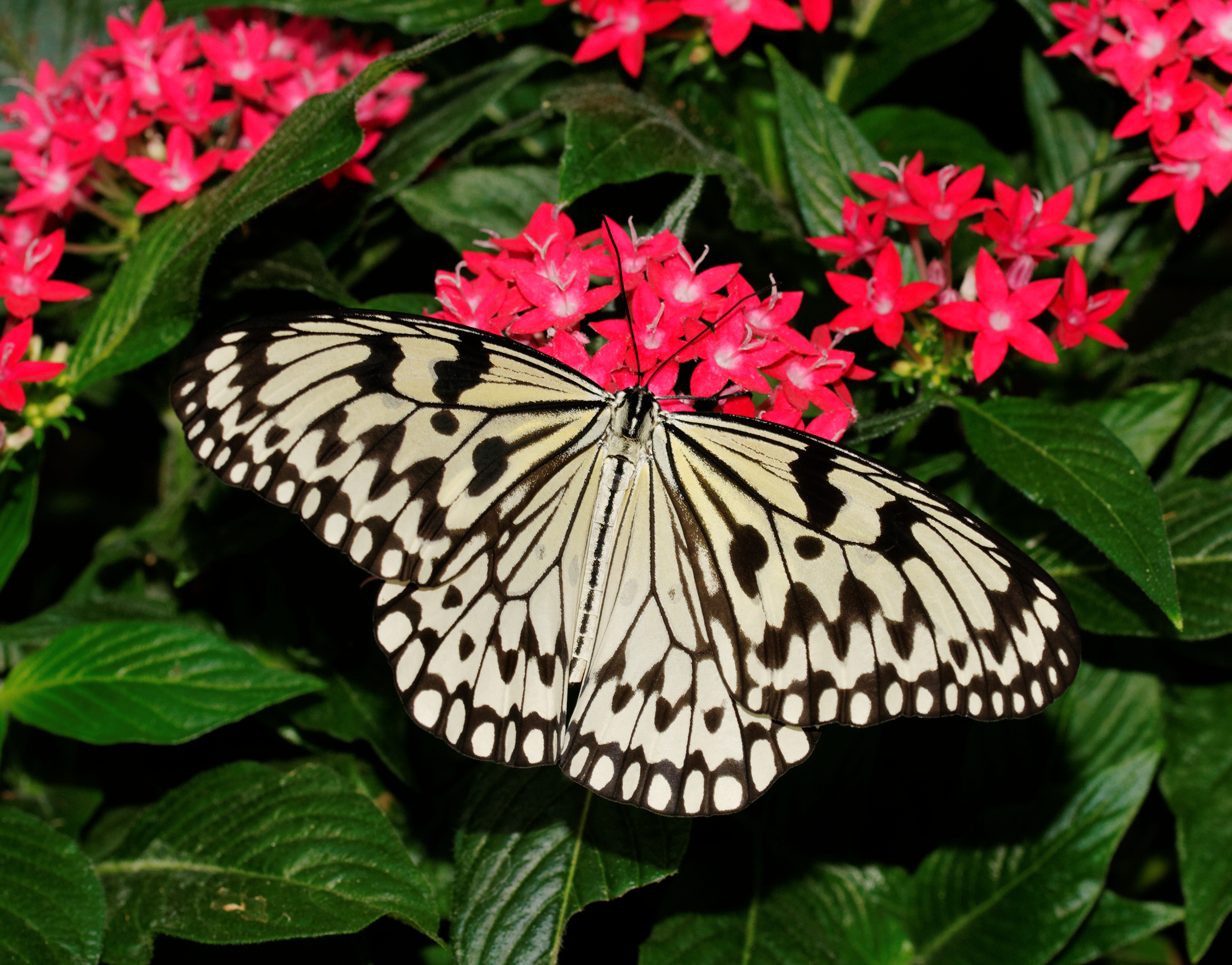
Rice paper butterfly, genus Idea

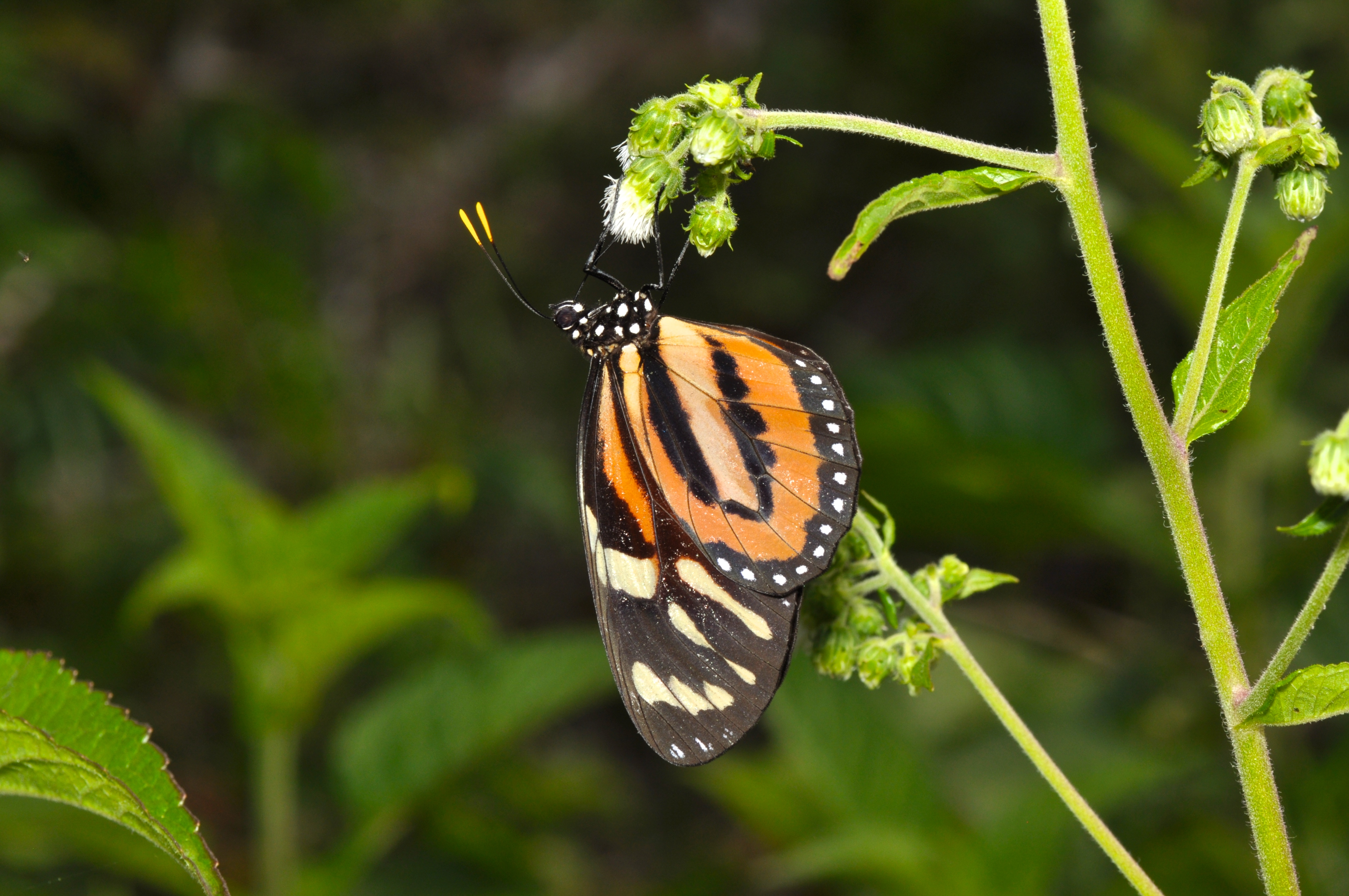
Tropical milkweed butterfly, genus Lycorea
