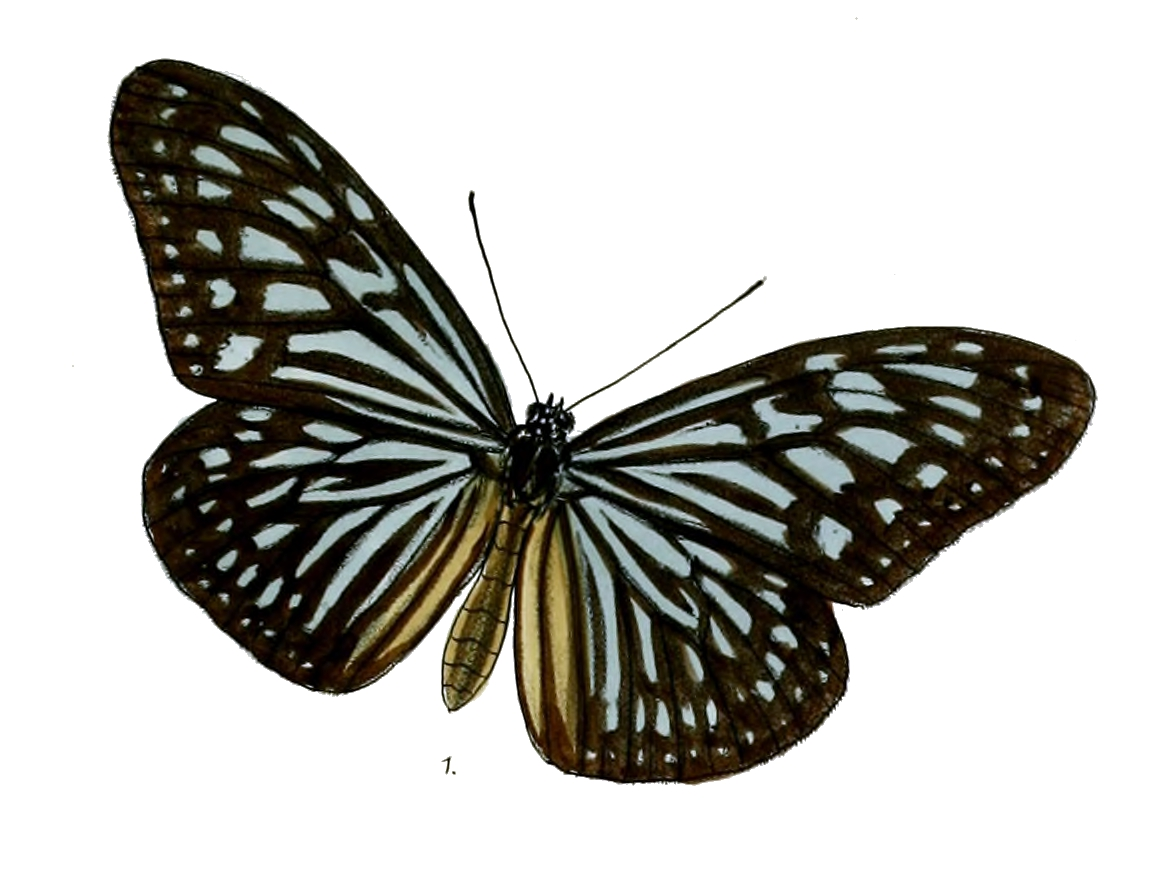
- Illustration of Ideopsis vulgaris

Scientific classification
- Kingdom: Animalia
- Phylum: Arthropoda
- Clade: Pancrustacea
- Class: Insecta
- Order: Lepidoptera
- Family: Nymphalidae
- Genus: Ideopsis
- Species: I. vulgaris

Binomial name
- Ideopsis vulgaris (Butler, 1874)

Synonyms
- List: Danais vulgaris Butler, 1874; Danaus vulgaris; Radena vulgaris; Ideopsis contigua Talbot, 1939; Ideopsis ditiones Fruhstorfer, 1911; Ideopsis interposita Fruhstorfer, 1910; Ideopsis lesora Fruhstrofer, 1910; Ieopsis macra Doherty, 1891; Ideopsis macrina Fruhstorfer, 1904; Ideopsis majasa Van Eecke, 1915; ideopsis mecrimaga Van Eecke, 1914; Ideopsis megaroides Fruhstorfer, 1904; Ideopsis ocarinis Corbet, 1942; Ideopsis palawana Staudinger, 1889; Ideopsis restricta Talbot, 1939; Ideopsis sumbawana Fruhstorfer, 1899; Ideopsis vanhasselti Van Eecke, 1915; Ideopsis vulgaroides Fruhstorfer, 1904

= Ideopsis vulgaris =

Blue glassy tiger

Species of butterfly

Ideopsis vulgaris, the blue glassy tiger, is a butterfly that belongs to the crows and tigers, that is, the danaid group of the brush-footed butterflies family. In 2023, Thapa and Bhuyan published a paper recording of this species from Dehing Patkai National Park in Assam, India, marking the first documented occurrence in the state and the second record for the country.

== Subspecies ==
Subspecies include:

- Ideopsis vulgaris contigua Talbot, 1939 – (Central Thailand, Laos, Vietnam, Hainan, China)
- Ideopsis vulgaris macrina (Fruhstorfer, 1904) – Myanmar, P. Thailand, Langkawi, W. Malaysia, Singapore, Sumatra, Batu Islands, Banka Island, Belitung)

== Distribution ==
This species can be found in India, SriLanka, Singapore, Thailand, Laos, Vietnam, Hainan, South Burma - Sundaland, Sumatra, Java, Lesser Sunda Islands - Alor, Borneo – Palawan.

== Habitat ==
These butterflies inhabits a range of habitats, but especially occur at the edge of rainforest or plantations and in the coastal mangrove areas.

== Description ==
Ideopsis vulgaris has a wingspan reaching 70–80 millimetres (2.8–3.1 in). This butterfly is quite similar to the dark glassy tiger (Parantica agleoides). A transverse black bar in the forewing cell, cutting through one of the white streaks, distinguishes the blue glassy tiger from the other one. As other milkweed butterfly it is mimicked by Chilasa clytia (Papilionidae).

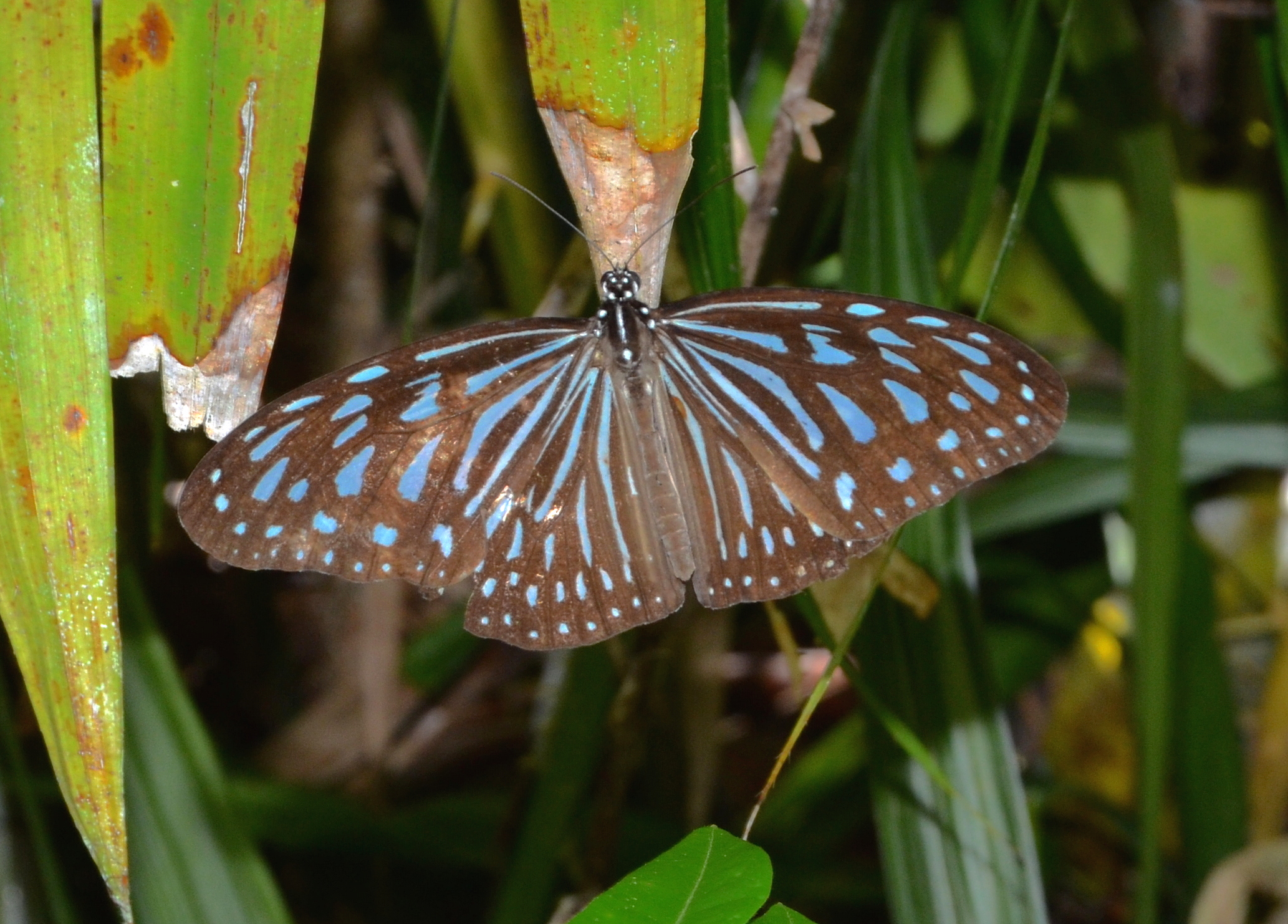
Upperside

Upperside: black, the dorsal margin of hindwing broadly cinereous; both wings with the following subhyaline bluish-white streaks and spots.

Forewing: a short streak along dorsal margin, two broad streaks united at base in interspace 1, the upper one curved, a broad streak in cell with an outwardly indented detached spot beyond it in apex, a slender costal streak, two large discal spots inwardly pointed, outwardly truncate, three elongate spots beyond apex of cell and four or five elongate preapical spots beyond them, finally a subterminal and a terminal series of spots decreasing in size towards apex of wing.

Hindwing: elongate streaks in interspaces 1 a and 1 b, two in interspace 1, two in cell with a short slender streak-obliquely between their apices, shorter streaks radiating outwards in interspaces 2–6, a sub-terminal series of small spots and a terminal row of dots beyond.

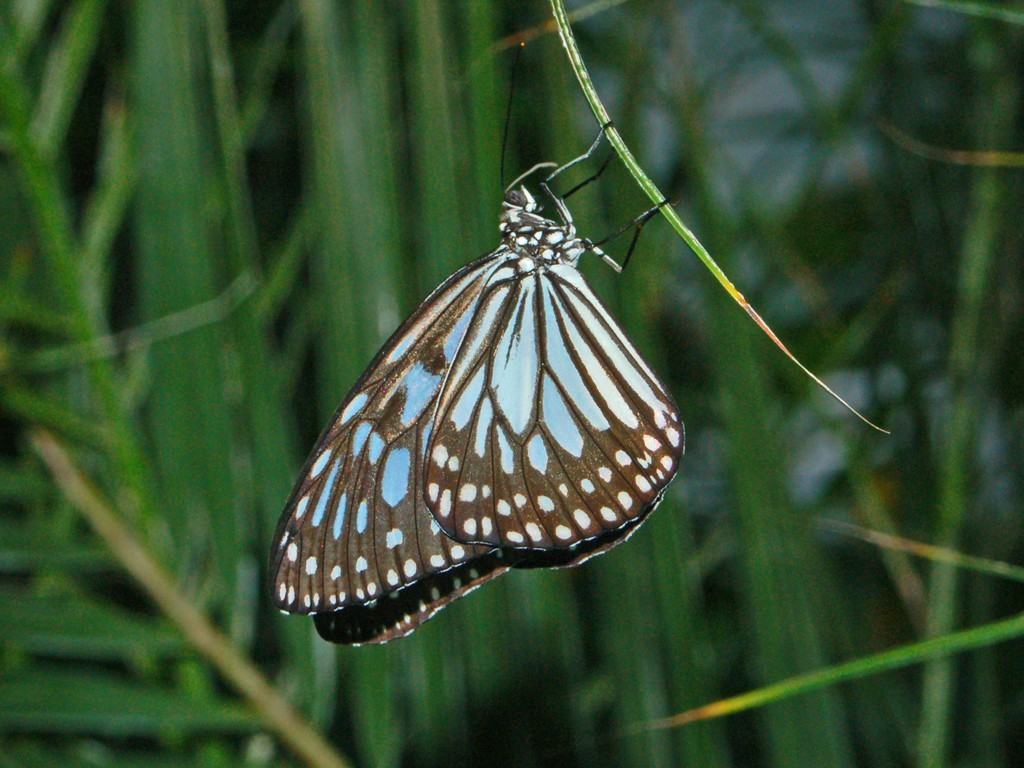
Ventral view of Ideopsis vulgaris macrina

Underside: similar, the markings better defined. Antennae black, palpi black above, bluish white below; head and thorax black, spotted with bluish white; abdomen brown above, sullied white below. Male without any special sex-marks on the wings.

Race exprompta, Butler (Sri Lanka). Closely resembles D. vulgaris Butler, but has all the markings much broader, the apical spot in cell of forewing outwardly less emarginate; on the hindwing interspaces 1 a and 1 b are entirely filled with the white streak, while the short slender streak lying between the apices of the streaks in the cell coalesces with the lower one.

Race nicobarica, W.-M. & de N. (Nicobar Islands). Like the preceding race, but the subhyaline markings still broader and somewhat blurred. Upperside: forewing: the whole basal two-thirds of interspace 1 bluish white, enclosing a fine longitudinal black line; streak in discoidal cell vary broad, occasionally produced to the apical spot in the cell. Hindwing: the black in interspace 1 reduced to a mere streak; cell entirely bluish white, traversed longitudinally by a faint black forked line. In the solitary specimen of the male in the collection of the British Museum this line is entirelyabsent.

== Similar species ==
- Blue tiger (Tirumala limniace)
- Dark glassy tiger (Parantica agleoides)

== Biology ==
Mating Ideopsis vulgaris macrina. Video clip

Adults can be found all the year around. They frequently visit flowers for feeding.

Females lay white eggs similar to a rugby ball. These eggs take about 3 days to hatch. The caterpillars are white with a black head, while the 2nd instar caterpillars are dark wine red to dark purplish brown colored, with whitish spots and a length about 7.5–8 mm (0.30–0.31 in). In the 5th and last instar caterpillars reach 34 mm (1.3 in).

Larvae feed on Gymnema species (Asclepiadaceae), Tylophora fleuxosa (a climber typical of mangrove areas), Tylophora tenuissima (Apocynaceae) and is thus distasteful to birds.

The pupa is bright yellowish green, with a length of 18–20 mm (0.71–0.79 in). After about 7 days the butterfly emerges.

== See also ==
- List of butterflies of India (Danainae)
