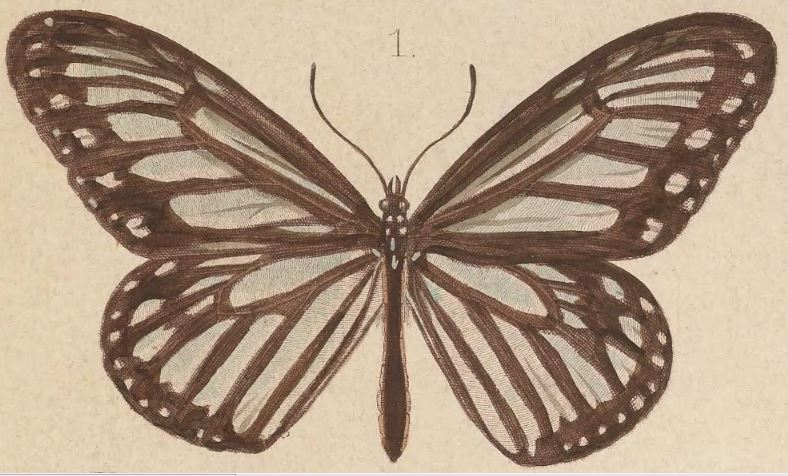

Conservation status
- Endangered (IUCN 2.3)

Scientific classification
- Kingdom: Animalia
- Phylum: Arthropoda
- Clade: Pancrustacea
- Class: Insecta
- Order: Lepidoptera
- Family: Nymphalidae
- Genus: Ideopsis
- Species: I. hewitsonii

Binomial name
- Ideopsis hewitsonii Kirsch, 1877

= Hewitson's small tree-nymph =

Species of butterfly

The Hewitson's small tree-nymph (Ideopsis hewitsonii) is a species of nymphalid butterfly in the Danainae subfamily. It is endemic to New Guinea (Indonesia).
