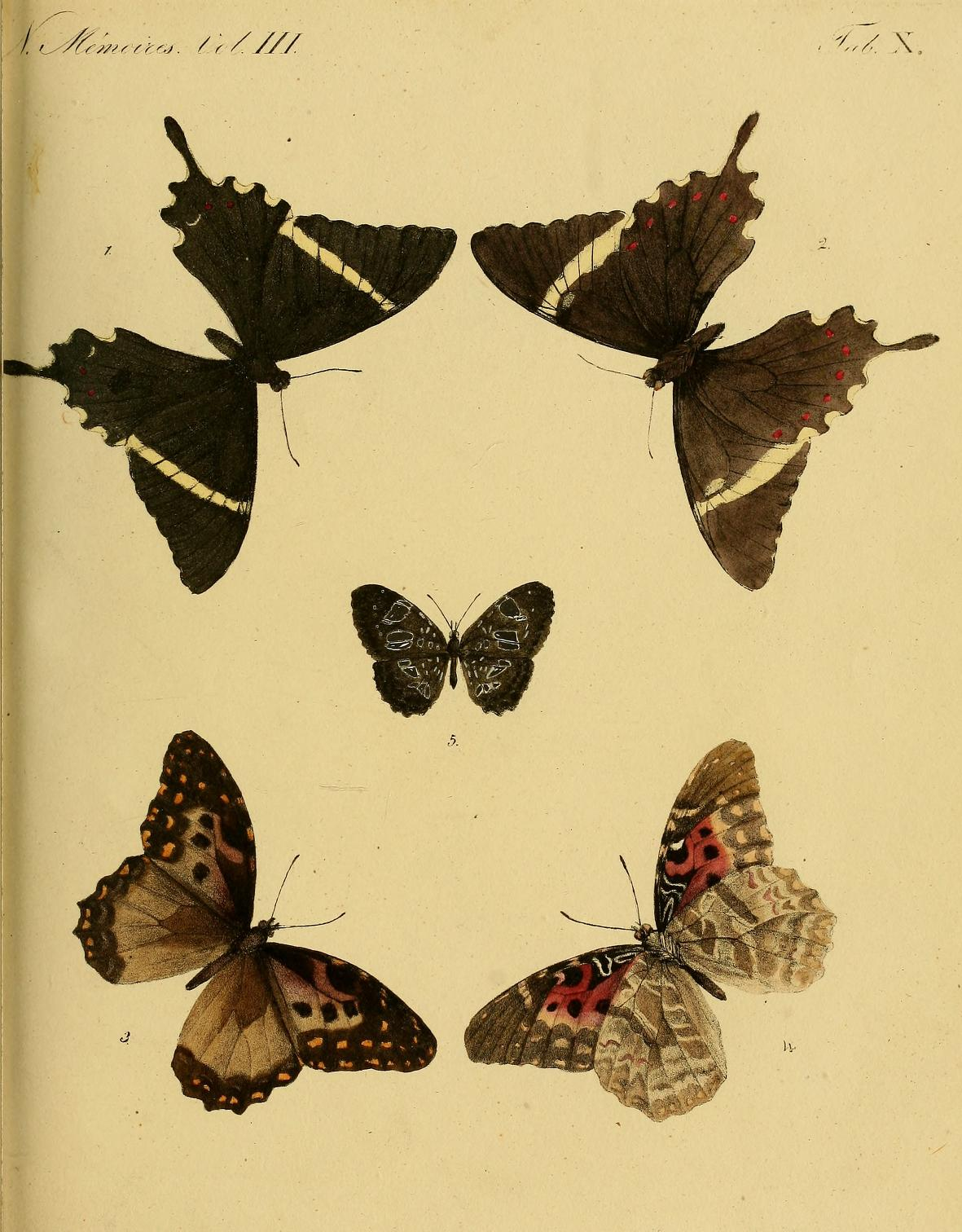

Conservation status
- Near Threatened (IUCN 2.3)

Scientific classification
- Kingdom: Animalia
- Phylum: Arthropoda
- Class: Insecta
- Order: Lepidoptera
- Family: Nymphalidae
- Genus: Anetia
- Species: A. jaegeri

Binomial name
- Anetia jaegeri (Ménétriés, 1832)

= Jaeger's anetia =

Species of butterfly

The Jaeger's anetia (Anetia jaegeri) is a species of nymphalid butterfly in the Danainae subfamily. It is found in the Dominican Republic, Haiti, and Jamaica.
