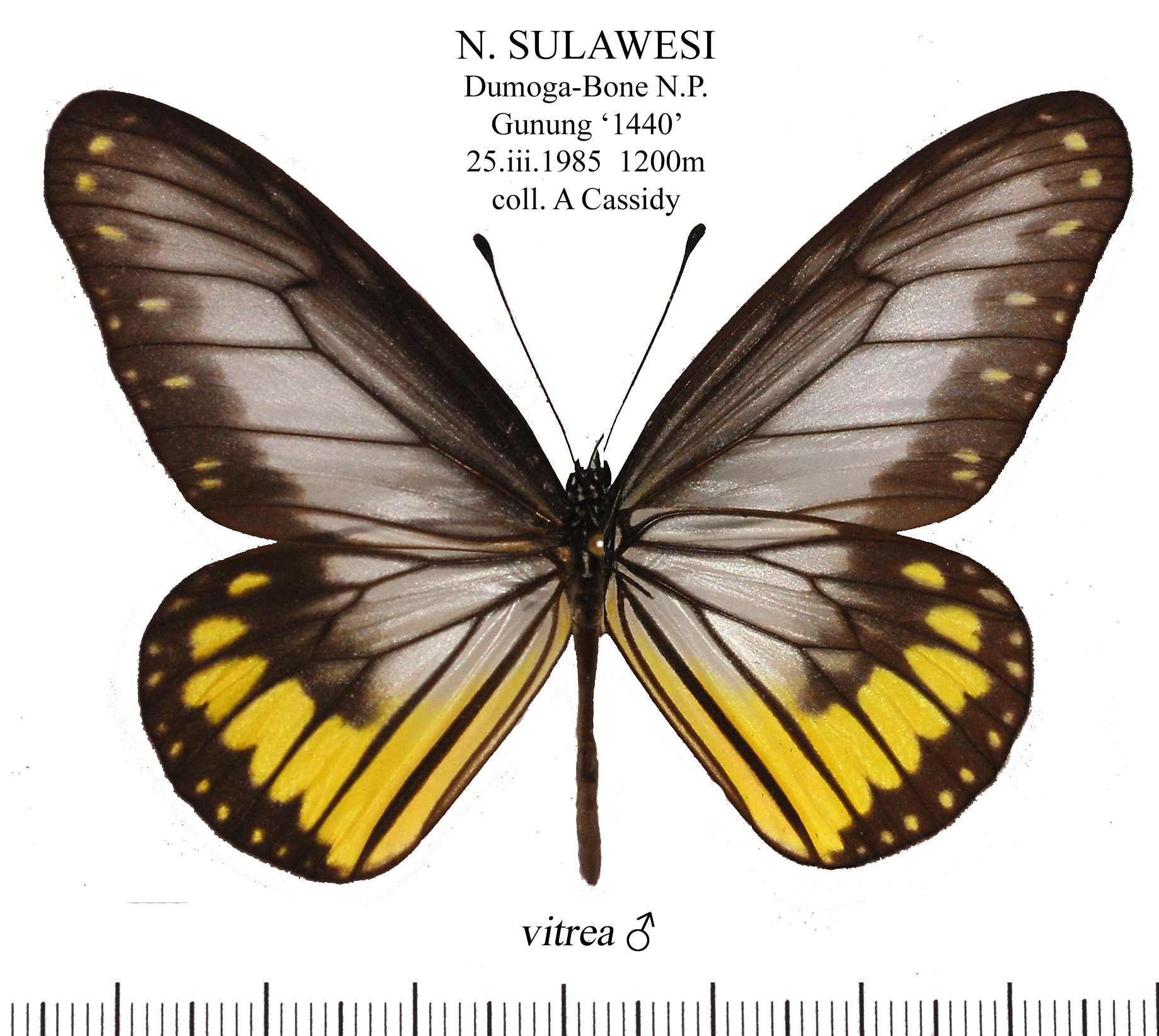
- Ideopsis vitrea vitrea

Scientific classification
- Domain: Eukaryota
- Kingdom: Animalia
- Phylum: Arthropoda
- Class: Insecta
- Order: Lepidoptera
- Family: Nymphalidae
- Subtribe: Danaina
- Genus: Ideopsis; Horsfield, 1857

Species
- See text

Synonyms
- Radena Moore, [1880]; Gamana Moore, 1883; Aianthis Fruhstorfer, 1910

= Ideopsis =

Genus of brush-footed butterflies

Ideopsis is a genus of nymphalid butterflies in the subfamily Danainae found in South-east Asia.

Large, slender, black and light blue or white butterflies. The body appears strikingly small and thin compared to the large wings. The genus resembles the genus of wood nymphs ( Idea spp.), but these butterflies are smaller than the wood nymphs.The clubbed antennae and particularly the genitalia distinguish it from Hestia, as also its generally very striking sexual dimorphism

== Species ==
Listed alphabetically:

- Ideopsis gaura (Horsfield, [1829]) – smaller wood nymph
- Ideopsis hewitsonii Kirsch, 1877 – Hewitson's small tree-nymph
- Ideopsis klassika Martin, 1909 – Seram small tree-nymph
- Ideopsis juventa (Cramer, [1777]) – wood nymph, gray or grey glassy tiger
- Ideopsis oberthurii (Doherty, 1891)
- Ideopsis similis (Linnaeus, 1758) – Ceylon blue glassy tiger
- Ideopsis vitrea (Blanchard, 1853) – Blanchard's ghost
- Ideopsis vulgaris (Butler, 1874) – blue glassy tiger
