= Ideopsis oberthurii =

Conservation status
- Vulnerable (IUCN 2.3)

Scientific classification
- Kingdom: Animalia
- Phylum: Arthropoda
- Class: Insecta
- Order: Lepidoptera
- Family: Nymphalidae
- Genus: Ideopsis
- Species: I. oberthurii

Binomial name
- Ideopsis oberthurii (Doherty, 1891)

Species of butterfly

Ideopsis oberthurii is a species of nymphalid butterfly in the Danainae subfamily. It is endemic to Indonesia.
