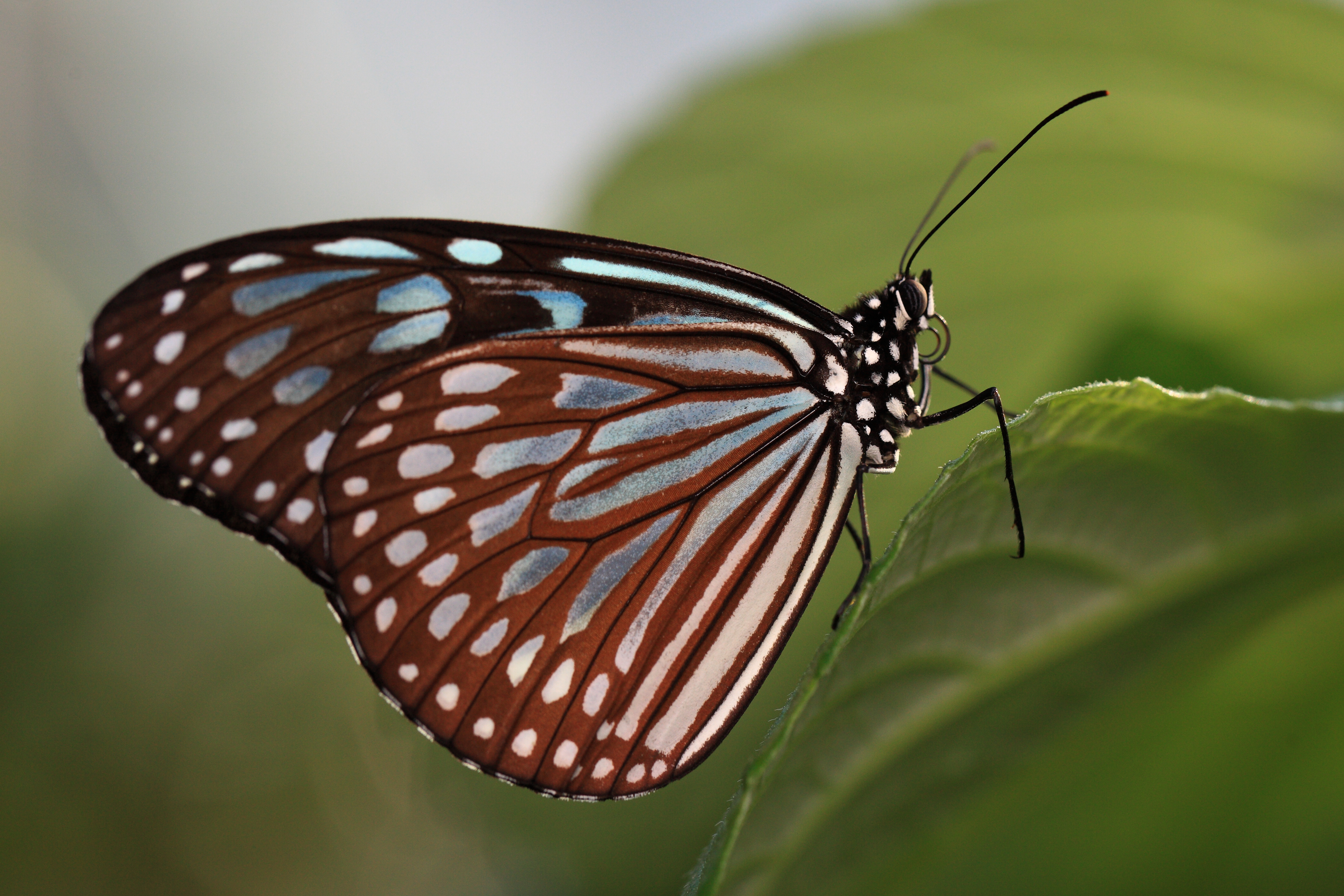

Scientific classification
- Kingdom: Animalia
- Phylum: Arthropoda
- Class: Insecta
- Order: Lepidoptera
- Family: Nymphalidae
- Genus: Ideopsis
- Species: I. similis

Binomial name
- Ideopsis similis (Linnaeus, 1758)

= Ideopsis similis =

Ceylon blue glassy tiger

Species of butterfly

Ideopsis similis, the Ceylon blue glassy tiger, is a species of butterfly found in Asia, including Sri Lanka, India and Taiwan, that belongs to the subfamily Danainae (crows and tigers), in the family Nymphalidae (brush-footed butterflies).

== See also ==
- http s://www.researchgat found in India. e.net/publication/37found in India 3433820_

BLUE_GLASSY_TIGER_IDEOPSIS_SIMILIS_PERSIMILIS_MOORE_1879_LEPIDOPTERA_NYMPHALIDAE-_FIRST_RECORD_FROM_DEHING_PATKAI_NATIONAL_PARK_ASSAM

- List of butterflies of India (Nymphalidae)
