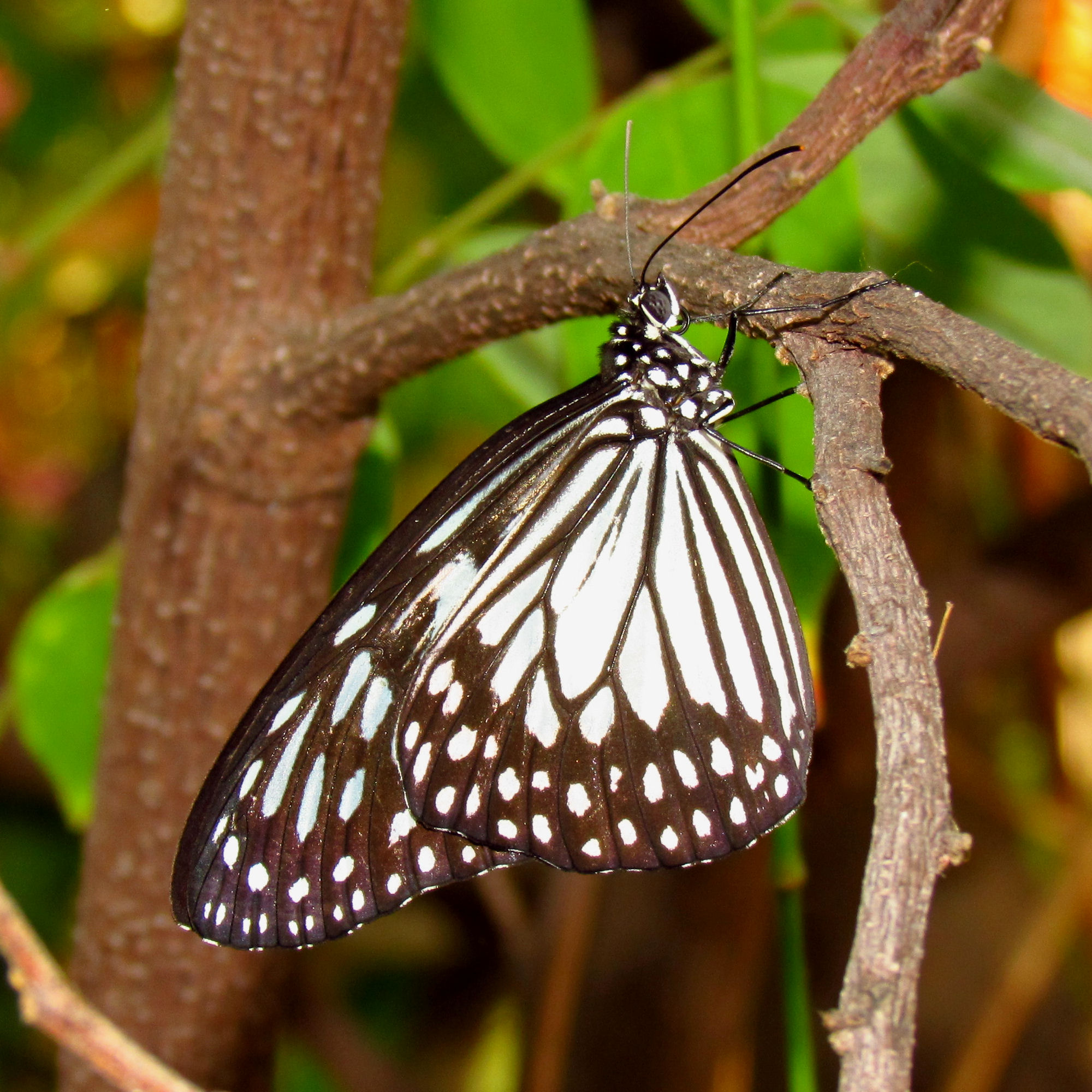
- Underside

Scientific classification
- Kingdom: Animalia
- Phylum: Arthropoda
- Class: Insecta
- Order: Lepidoptera
- Family: Nymphalidae
- Genus: Ideopsis
- Species: I. juventa

Binomial name
- Ideopsis juventa (Cramer, [1777])

Synonyms
- Papilio juventa Cramer, [1777]; Ideopsis catella Fruhstorfer, 1912; Ideopsis chevalieri Hulstaert, 1924; Ideopsis claviger (Gmelin, 1790); Ideopsis doreyana Joicey & Talbot, 1925; Ideopsis hadrumeta Fruhstorfer, 1911; Ideopsis homonyma Bryk, 1937; Radena kambera Doherty, 1891; Ideopsis krakatauae Moulton, 1921; Ideopsis messana Fruhstorfer, 1913; Ideopsis nicobarica Wood-Mason, 1881; Ideopsis piada Fruhstorfer, 1915; Ideopsis remota van Eecke, 1915; Ideopsis robinsoni Rothschild, 1920; Ideopsis simillima van Eecke, 1915; Ideopsis suluana Talbot, 1943; Ideopsis tipasa Fruhstorfer, 1911; Ideopsis uluana Talbot, 1943; Radena juventa; Danaus juventa

= Ideopsis juventa =

Wood nymph

Species of butterfly

Ideopsis juventa, the wood nymph, gray glassy tiger or grey glassy tiger, is a species of nymphalid butterfly in the Danainae subfamily. It is found in Southeast Asia.

This butterfly is dark gray or black with two rows of circular white dots along the margins of its wings and elongated white patches closer to the body. The elongated white patches appear to radiate from the thorax.

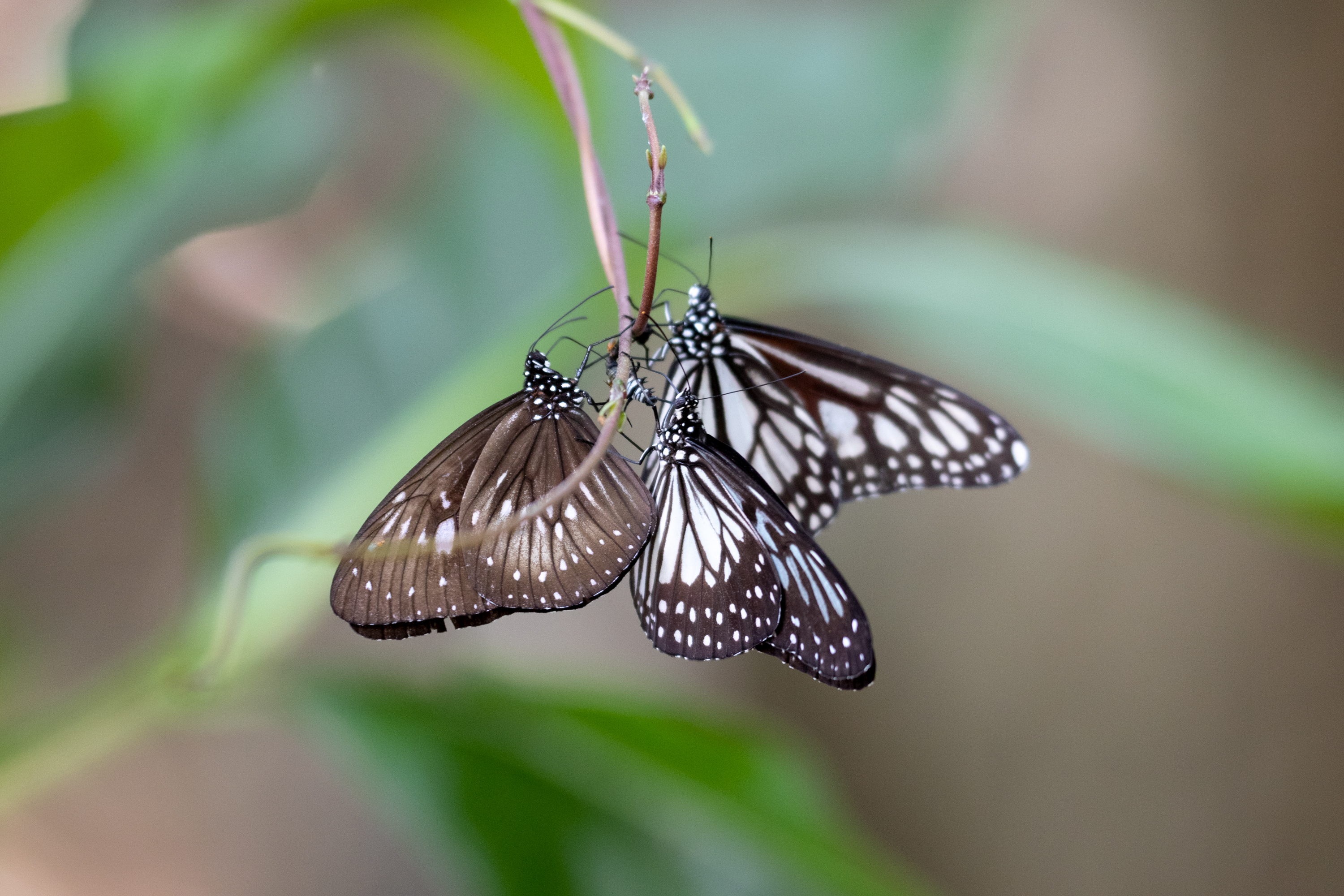
Ideopsis juventa(middle) along with Danaus ismare(right) and Euploea algea(left)

== Life cycle ==
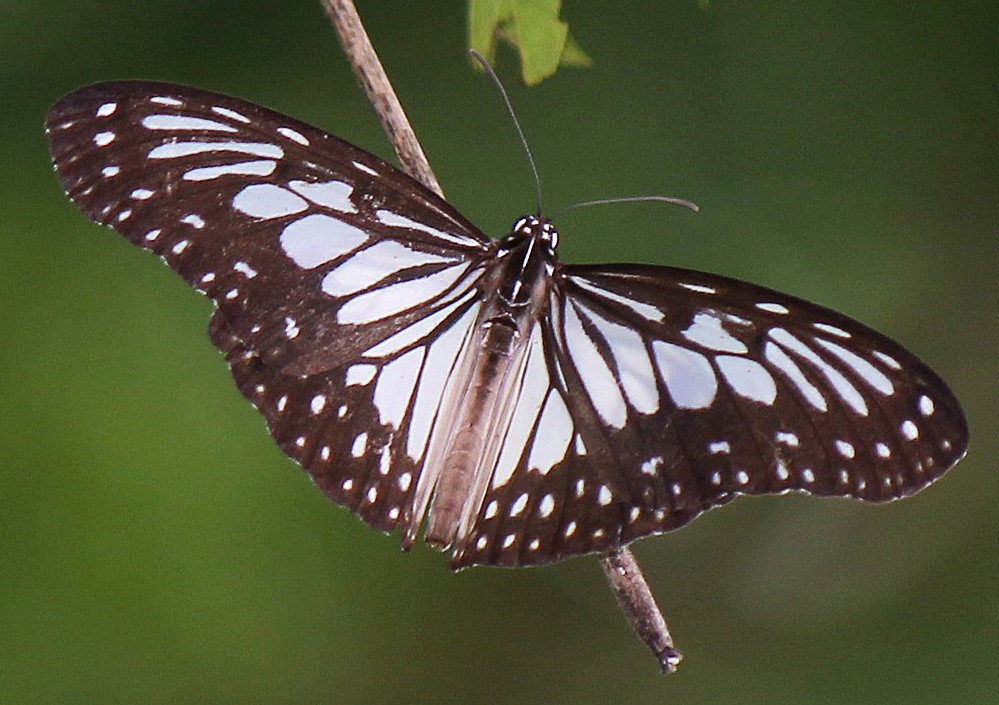
Adult

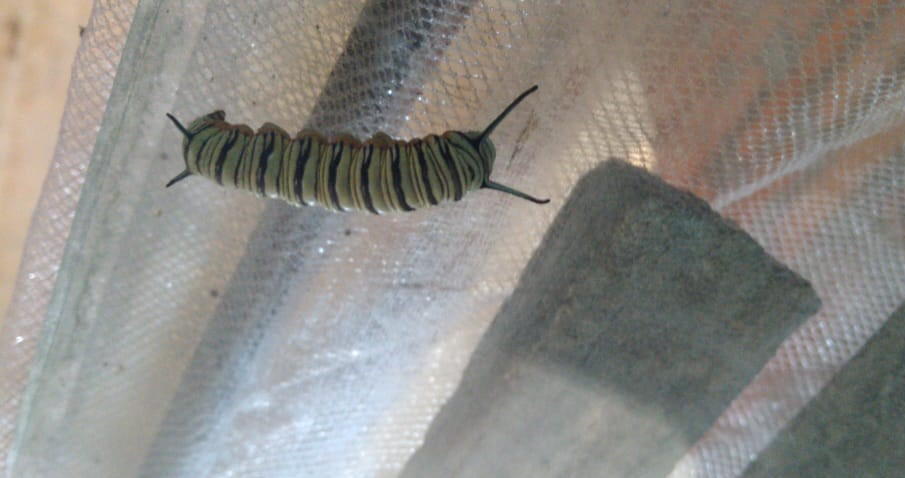
Larva

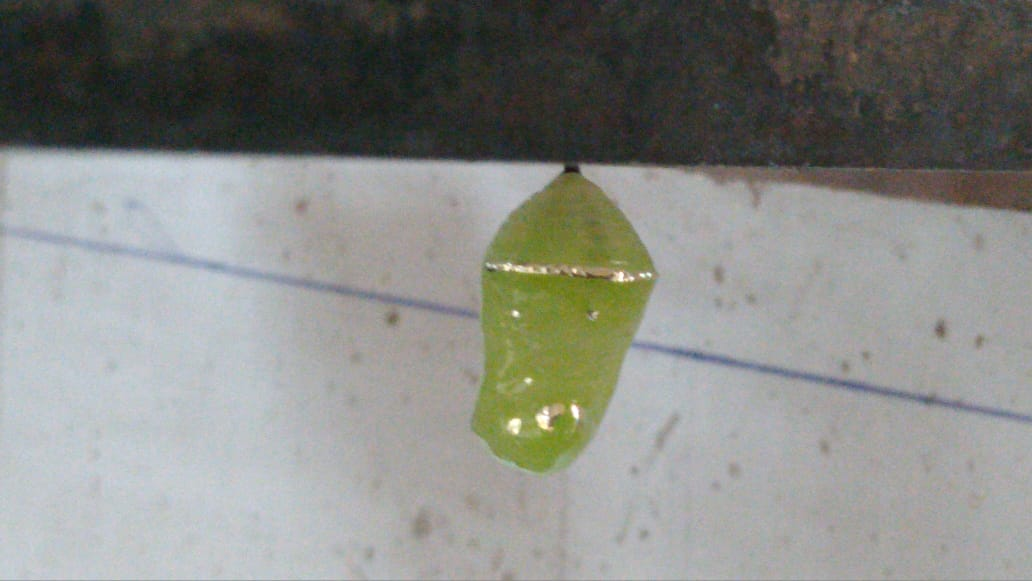
Pupa

== Subspecies ==
- I. j. juventa (Java, Bali)
- I. j. pseudosimilis van Eecke, 1915 (Sumatra, Bangka)
- I. j. scrobia van Eecke, 1915 (Belitung)
- I. j. sapana Talbot, 1943 (Kangean)
- I. j. longa Doherty, 1891 (Enggano)
- I. j. stictica Fruhstorfer, 1899 (Sumbawa)
- I. j. phana Fruhstorfer, 1904 (Lombok)
- I. j. kallatia Fruhstorfer, 1904 (Kalao)
- I. j. lycosura Fruhstorfer, 1910 (Bonerate)
- I. j. sitah (Fruhstorfer, 1904) (Natuna Islands, Islands on east coast of Malaya)
- I. j. kinitis Fruhstorfer, 1904 (northern Borneo)
- I. j. ishma Butler, 1869 (Sulawesi)
- I. j. garia Fruhstorfer, 1904 (Philippines: Basilan)
- I. j. manillana Moore, 1883 (Philippines: Luzon)
- I. j. luzonica Moore, 1883 (Philippines: Babuyanes)
- I. j. satellitica Fruhstorfer, 1899 (Selajar)
- I. j. sophonisbe Fruhstorfer, 1904 (Sula Mangoli)
- I. j. sequana Fruhstorfer, 1910 (Tukangbesi Islands)
- I. j. tontoliensis (Fruhstorfer, 1897) (north-eastern Sulawesi)
- I. j. lirungensis Fruhstorfer, 1899 (Talaud Islands)
- I. j. curtisi Moore, 1883 (Halmahera, Ternate, Bachan)
- I. j. ellida Fruhstorfer, 1904 (Obi)
- I. j. meganire (Godart, 1819) (Buru, Ambon, Serang)
- I. j. bosnika (Talbot, 1943) (Biak)
- I. j. sobrina (Boisduval, 1832) (West Irian)
- I. j. purpurata (Butler, 1866) (Salawati, Misool, Waigeu)
- I. j. tanais (Fruhstorfer, 1904) (Geelvink Bay)
- I. j. kolleri (Hulstaert, 1923) (West Irian)
- I. j. hollandia (Talbot, 1943) (West Irian: Humboldt Bay)
- I. j. metaxa Fruhstorfer, 1910 (Finschhafe, Huon Gulf, New Guinea)
- I. j. eugenia (Fruhstorfer, 1907) (north-western New Guinea, Vulcan, Dampier, Rooke Islands)
- I. j. georgina Fruhstorfer, 1904 (south-eastern Papua)
- I. j. sobrinoides Butler, 1882 (Admiralty Islands to New Britain to New Ireland to the Solomon Islands)
- I. j. zanira Fruhsorfer, 1904 (Maleita, Savo)
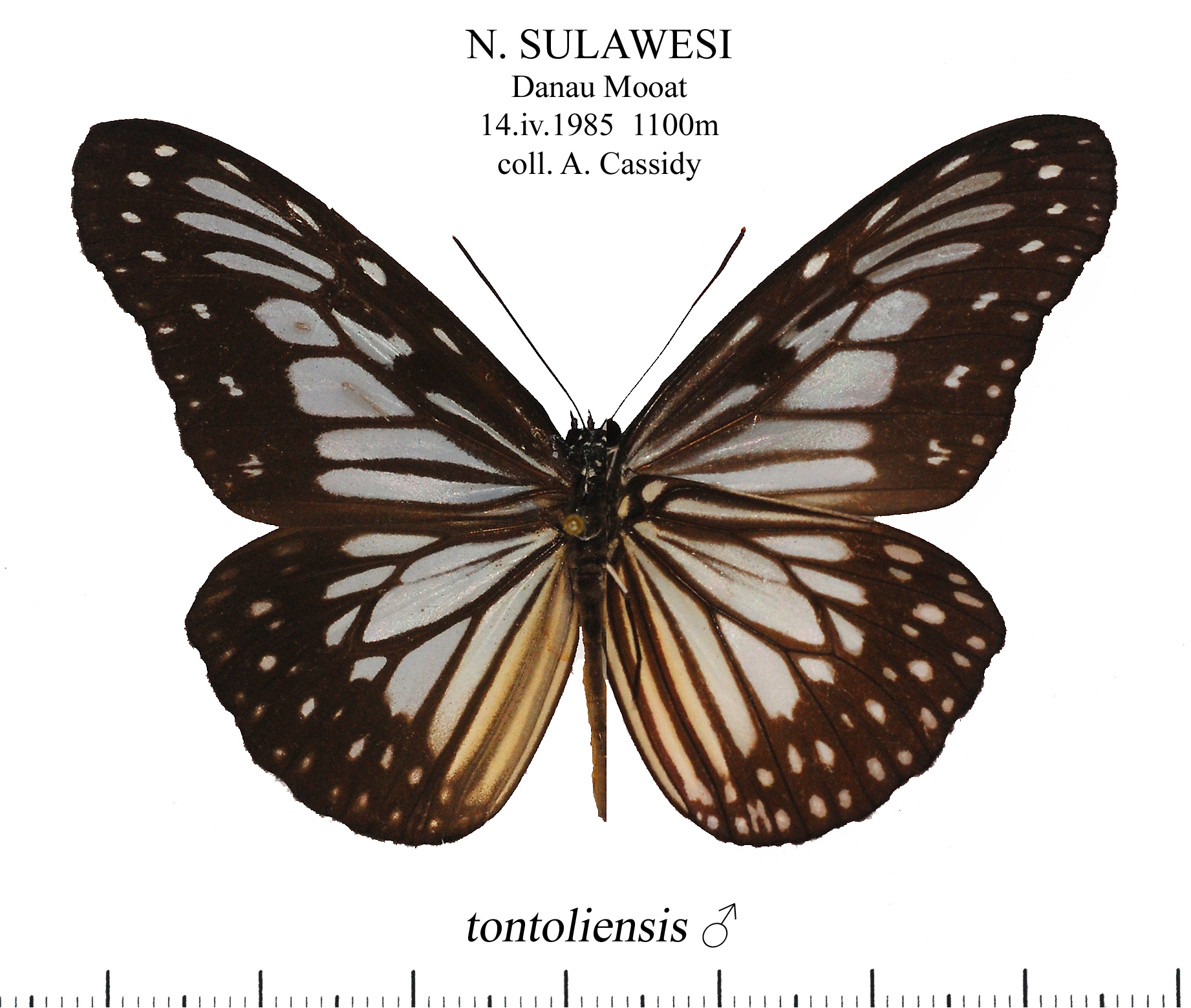
I. j. tontoliensis, male

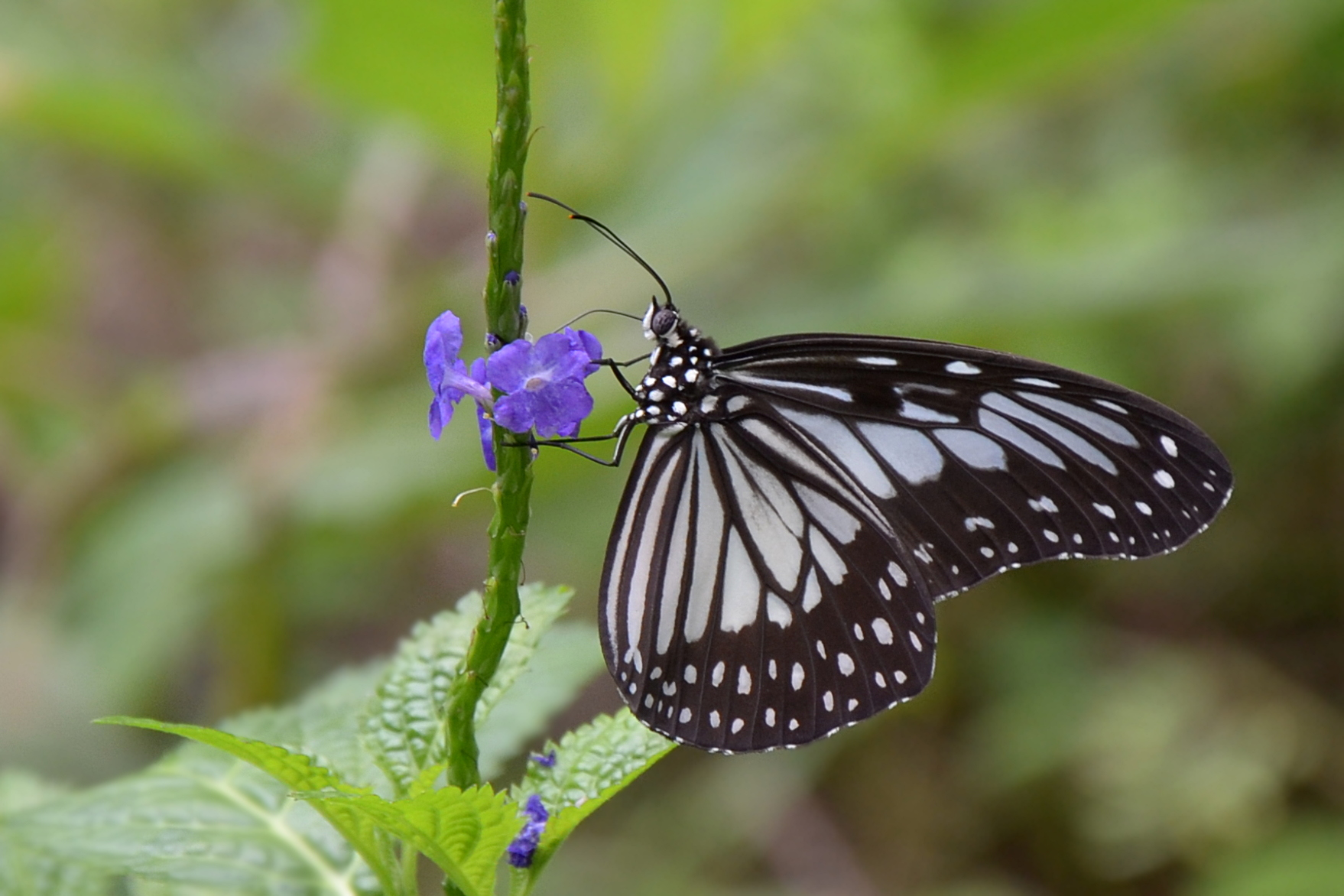
Ideopsis juventa at Warembungan, Minahasa Regency, North Sulawesi
