= Magpie (butterfly) =

Conservation status
- Near Threatened (IUCN 2.3)

Scientific classification
- Kingdom: Animalia
- Phylum: Arthropoda
- Clade: Pancrustacea
- Class: Insecta
- Order: Lepidoptera
- Family: Nymphalidae
- Subtribe: Euploeina
- Genus: Protoploea; Ackery & Vane-Wright, 1984
- Species: P. apatela

Binomial name
- Protoploea apatela (Joicey & Talbot, 1925)

Brush-footed butterfly genus and its sole species

Protoploea apatela, the magpie, is a species of nymphalid butterfly in the Danainae subfamily.

It is monotypic within the genus Protoploea.

== Distribution ==
Protoploea apatela is endemic to montane New Guinea island, found in Papua New Guinea, and in Western New Guinea of Indonesia.

It is a near threatened species on the IUCN Red List.
