= Salvin's anetia =

- Anetia cubana in Seitz

Conservation status
- Near Threatened (IUCN 2.3)

Scientific classification
- Kingdom: Animalia
- Phylum: Arthropoda
- Clade: Pancrustacea
- Class: Insecta
- Order: Lepidoptera
- Family: Nymphalidae
- Genus: Anetia
- Species: A. cubana

Binomial name
- Anetia cubana (Salvin, 1869)

Species of butterfly

The Salvin's anetia (Anetia cubana) is a species of nymphalid butterfly in the Danainae subfamily. It is endemic to Cuba.

== Sources ==
- IUCN Red List of All Threatened Species.
