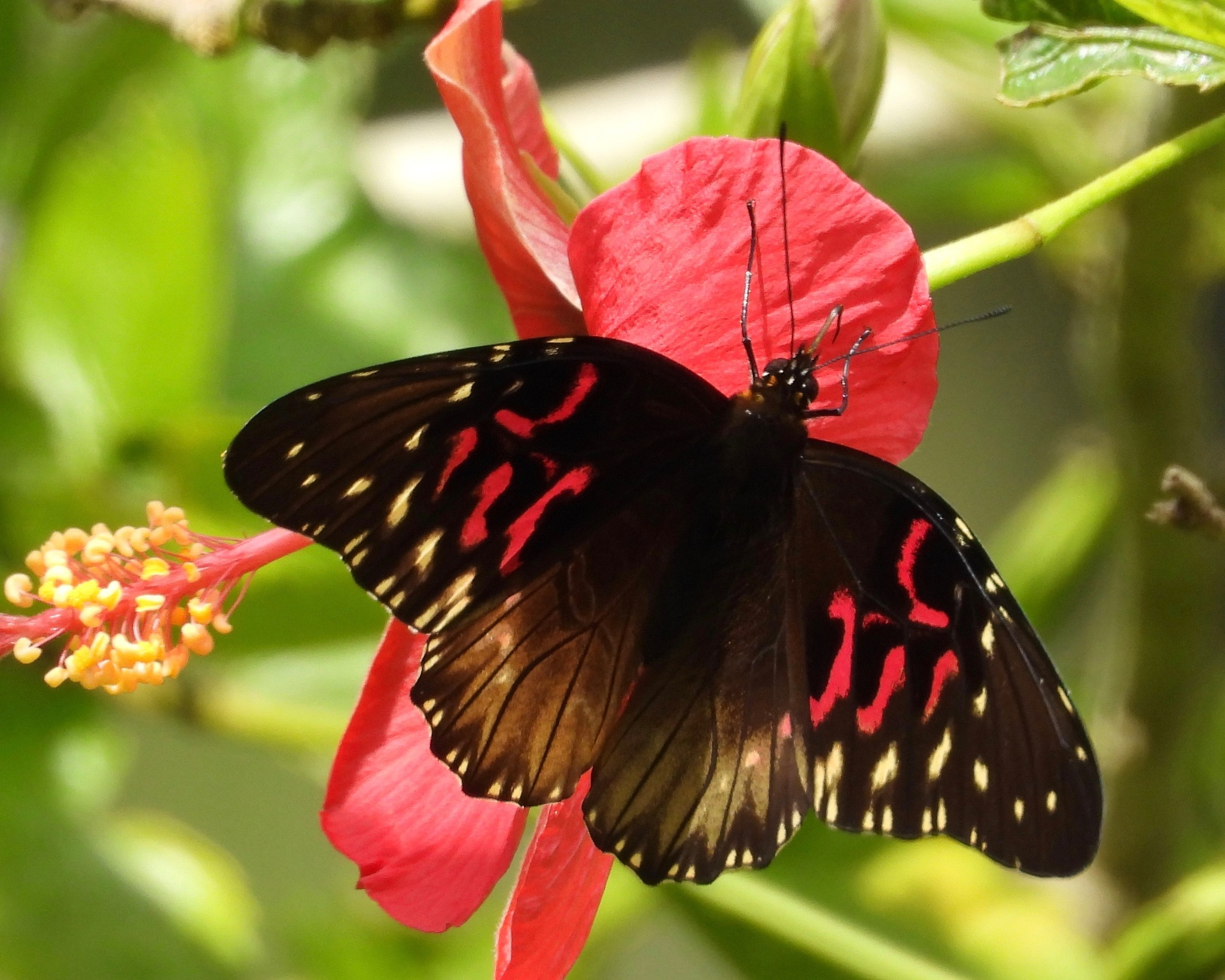
- Feeding on Hibiscus

Scientific classification
- Domain: Eukaryota
- Kingdom: Animalia
- Phylum: Arthropoda
- Class: Insecta
- Order: Lepidoptera
- Family: Nymphalidae
- Genus: Anetia
- Species: A. thirza

Binomial name
- Anetia thirza (Geyer, [1833])

Synonyms
- Anelia thirza Geyer, [1833]; Clothilda thirza; Argynnis euryale Klug, 1836; Synalpe euryale; Clothilda insignis Salvin, 1869; Anetia insignis

= Anetia thirza =

Species of butterfly

Anetia thirza, the cloud-forest monarch, is a butterfly of the family Nymphalidae. It is found in Mexico and Central America (including El Salvador, Costa Rica and Panama).

The larvae possibly feed on Metastelma and Cynanchum species.

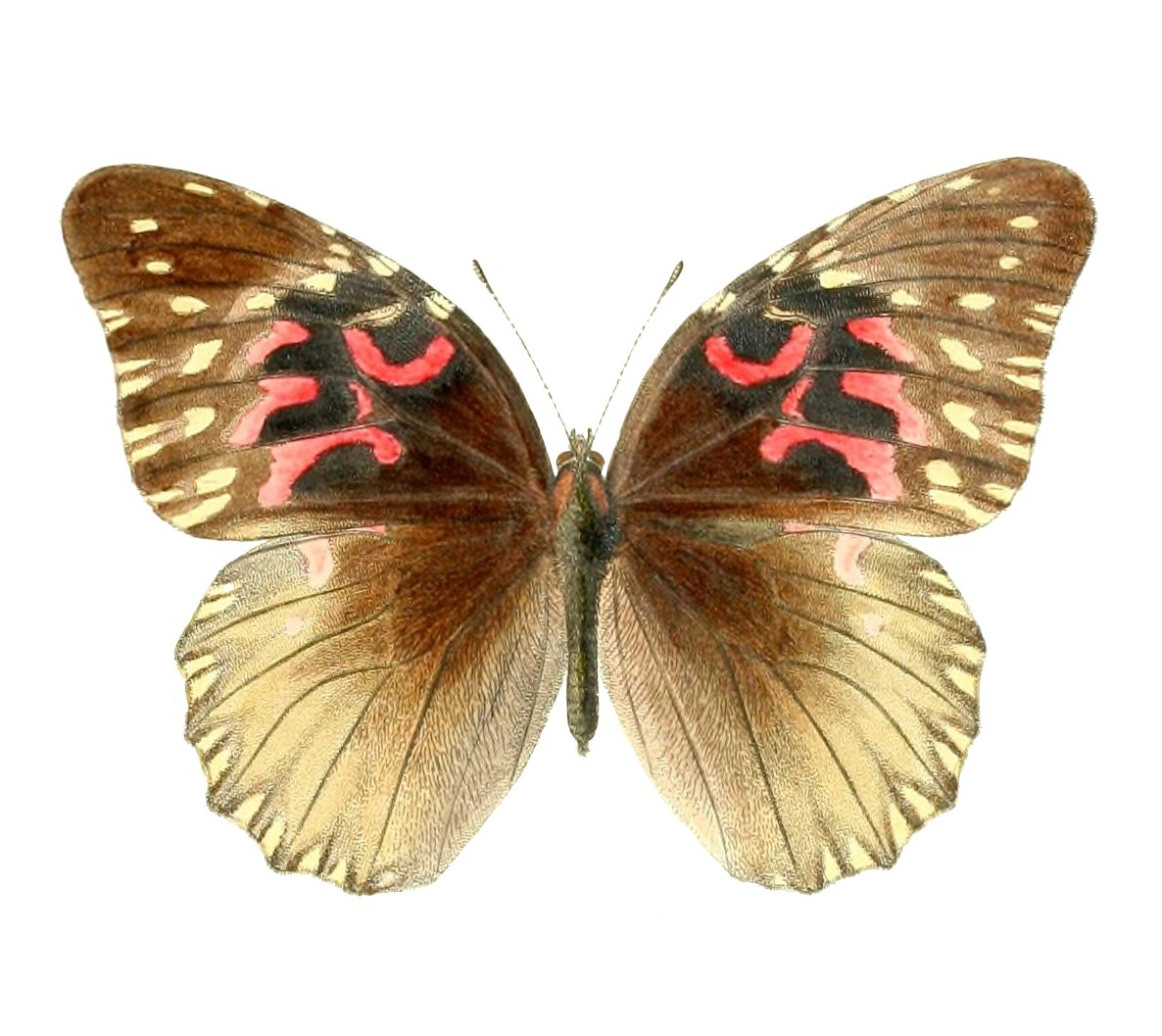
Mounted Specimen

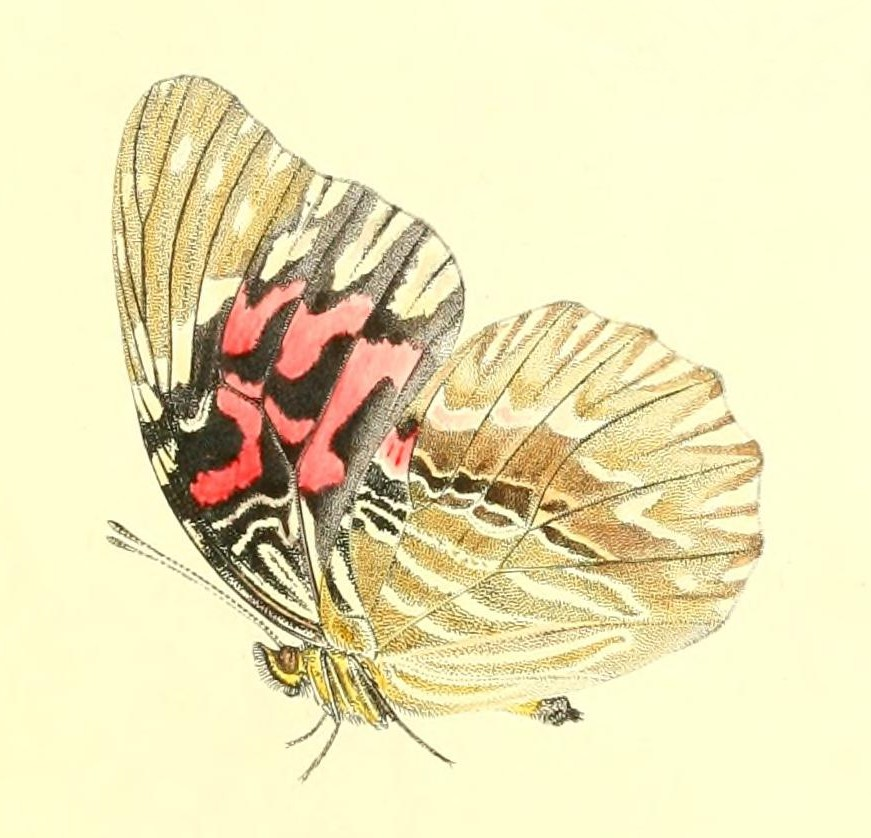
Illustration

== Subspecies ==
- Anetia thirza thirza (Mexico)
- Anetia thirza insignis (Salvin, 1869) (Costa Rica, Panama)
