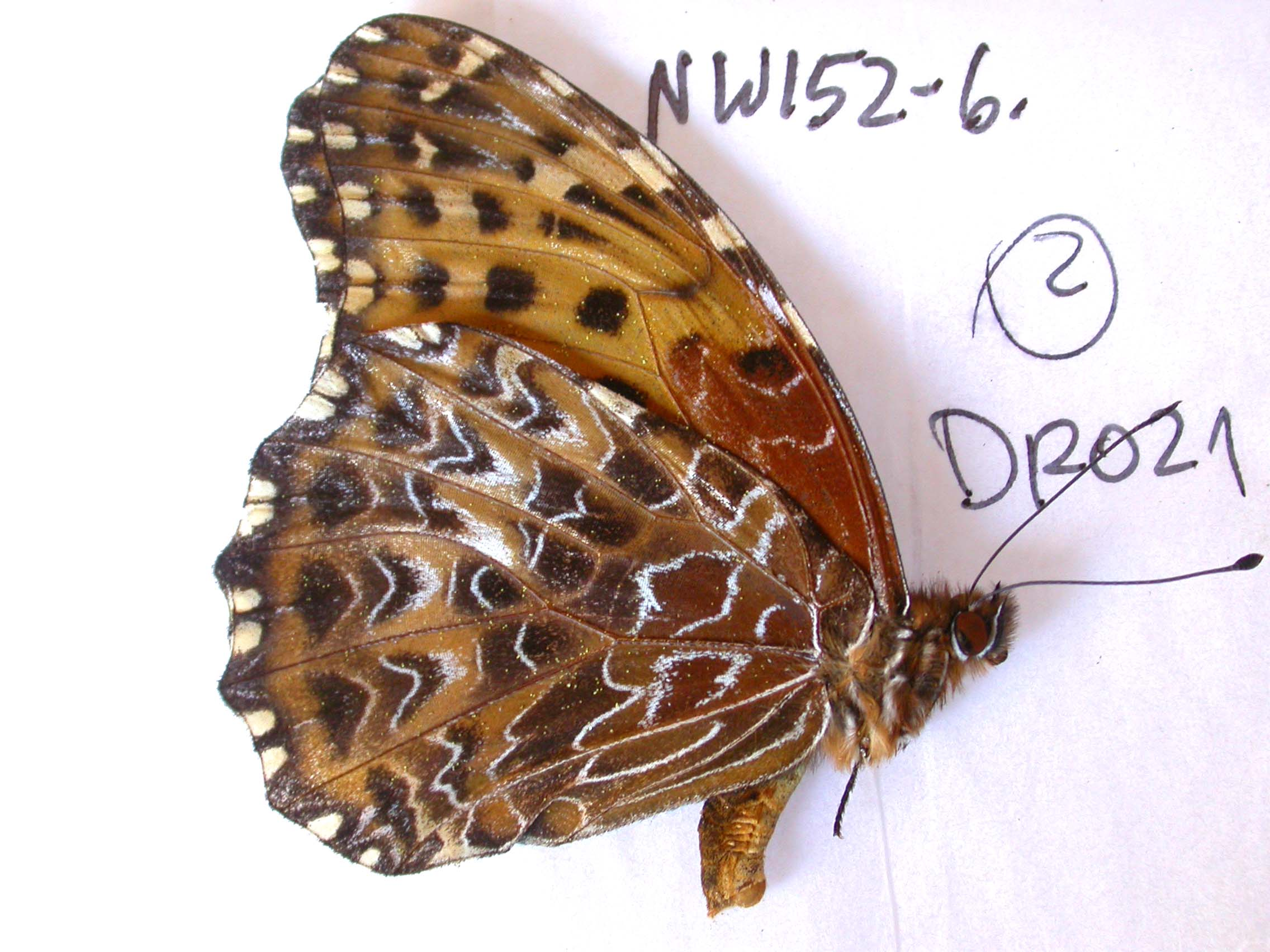

Conservation status
- Near Threatened (IUCN 2.3)

Scientific classification
- Kingdom: Animalia
- Phylum: Arthropoda
- Class: Insecta
- Order: Lepidoptera
- Family: Nymphalidae
- Genus: Anetia
- Species: A. briarea

Binomial name
- Anetia briarea (Godart, 1819)

= Lesser false fritillary =

Species of butterfly

The lesser false fritillary (Anetia briarea) is a species of butterfly in the Danainae subfamily. It is found in Cuba, the Dominican Republic, and Haiti.
