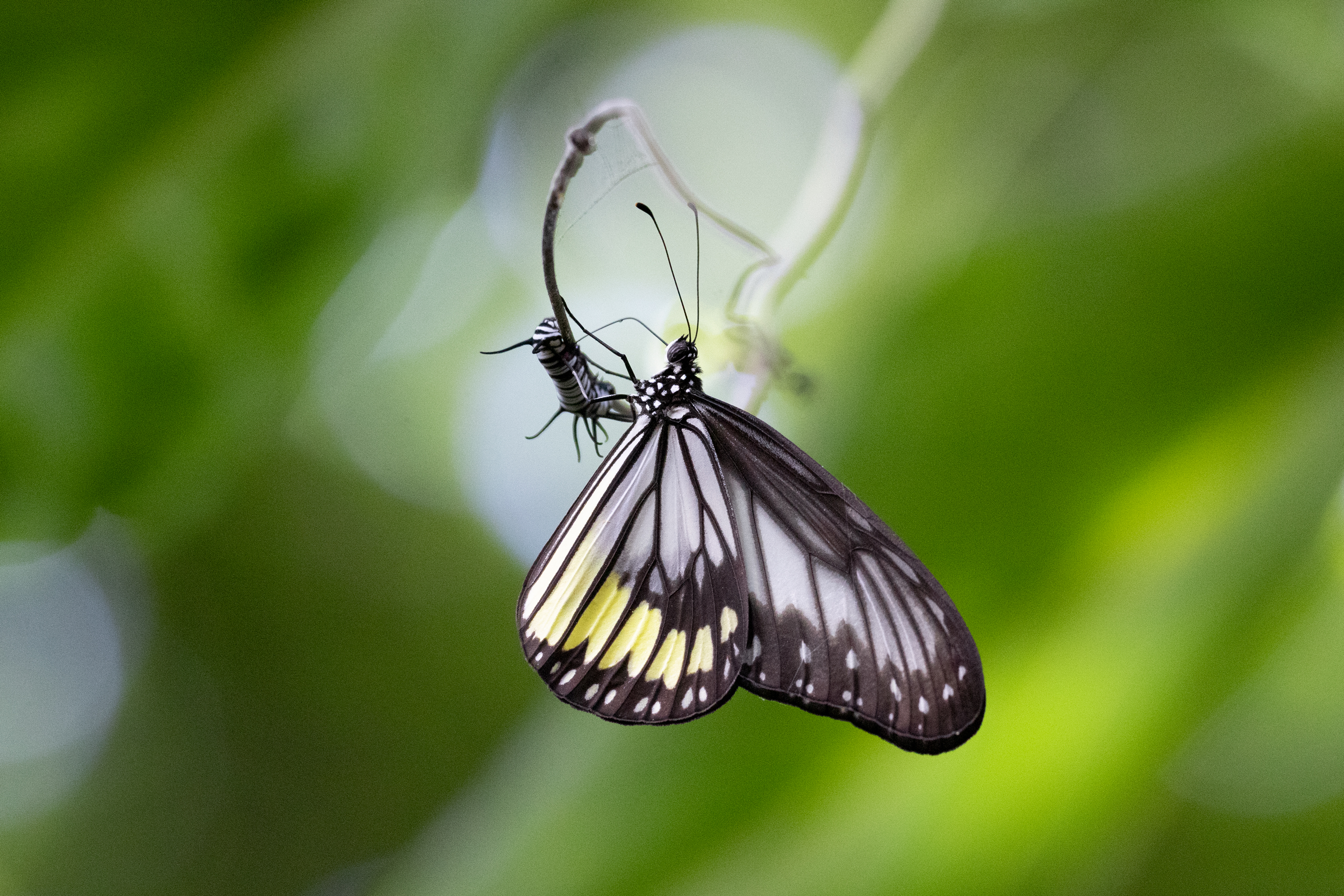
- Feeding on caterpillar

Scientific classification
- Kingdom: Animalia
- Phylum: Arthropoda
- Class: Insecta
- Order: Lepidoptera
- Family: Nymphalidae
- Genus: Ideopsis
- Species: I. vitrea

Binomial name
- Ideopsis vitrea (Blanchard, 1853)

Synonyms
- Danais vitrea Blanchard, 1853; Ideopsis vitrea arfakensis Fruhstorfer, 1899; Danais morotaica Fruhstorfer, 1918; Danais neleus Fruhstorfer, 1904; Ideopsis phaestis C. & R. Felder, 1865; Danais salvini Butler, 1866; Danais chloris C. & R. Felder, 1860; Danais inuncta Butler, 1865; Danais oenopia C. & R. Felder, 1859; Ideopsis ribbei Röber, 1887

= Ideopsis vitrea =

Species of butterfly

Ideopsis vitrea, the Blanchard's ghost, is a butterfly of the family Nymphalidae. It is found on Sulawesi, the Moluccas and New Guinea.

== Subspecies ==
- Ideopsis vitrea vitrea (West Irian: Arfak Mountains)
- Ideopsis vitrea chloris (C. & R. Felder, 1860) (Morotai, Halmahera, Ternate, Bachan, Buru)
- Ideopsis vitrea obiana Fruhstorfer, 1910 (Obi)
- Ideopsis vitrea inuncta (Butler, 1865) (Gebe Island, Waigeu)
- Ideopsis vitrea onina Talbot, 1940 (West Irian: Onin Peninsula)
- Ideopsis vitrea serena Joicey & Talbot, 1916 (West Irian: Wandammen Mountains)
- Ideopsis vitrea oenopia (C. & R. Felder, 1859) (Sulawesi)
- Ideopsis vitrea arachosia Fruhstorfer, 1910 (southern Sulawesi)
- Ideopsis vitrea iza Fruhstorfer, 1899 (Sula Islands)
- Ideopsis vitrea ribbei Röber, 1887 (Banggai Islands)

== Gallery ==
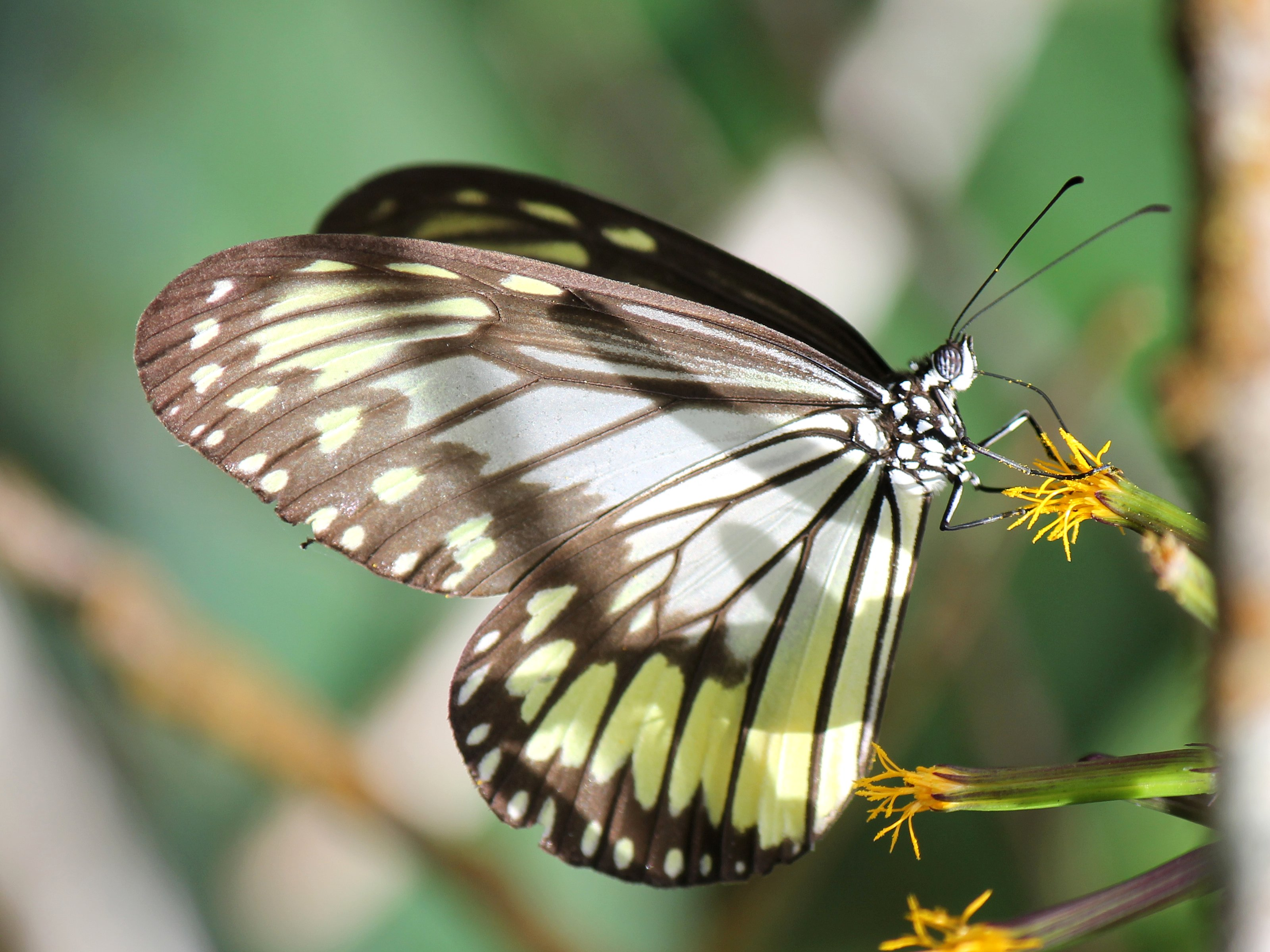

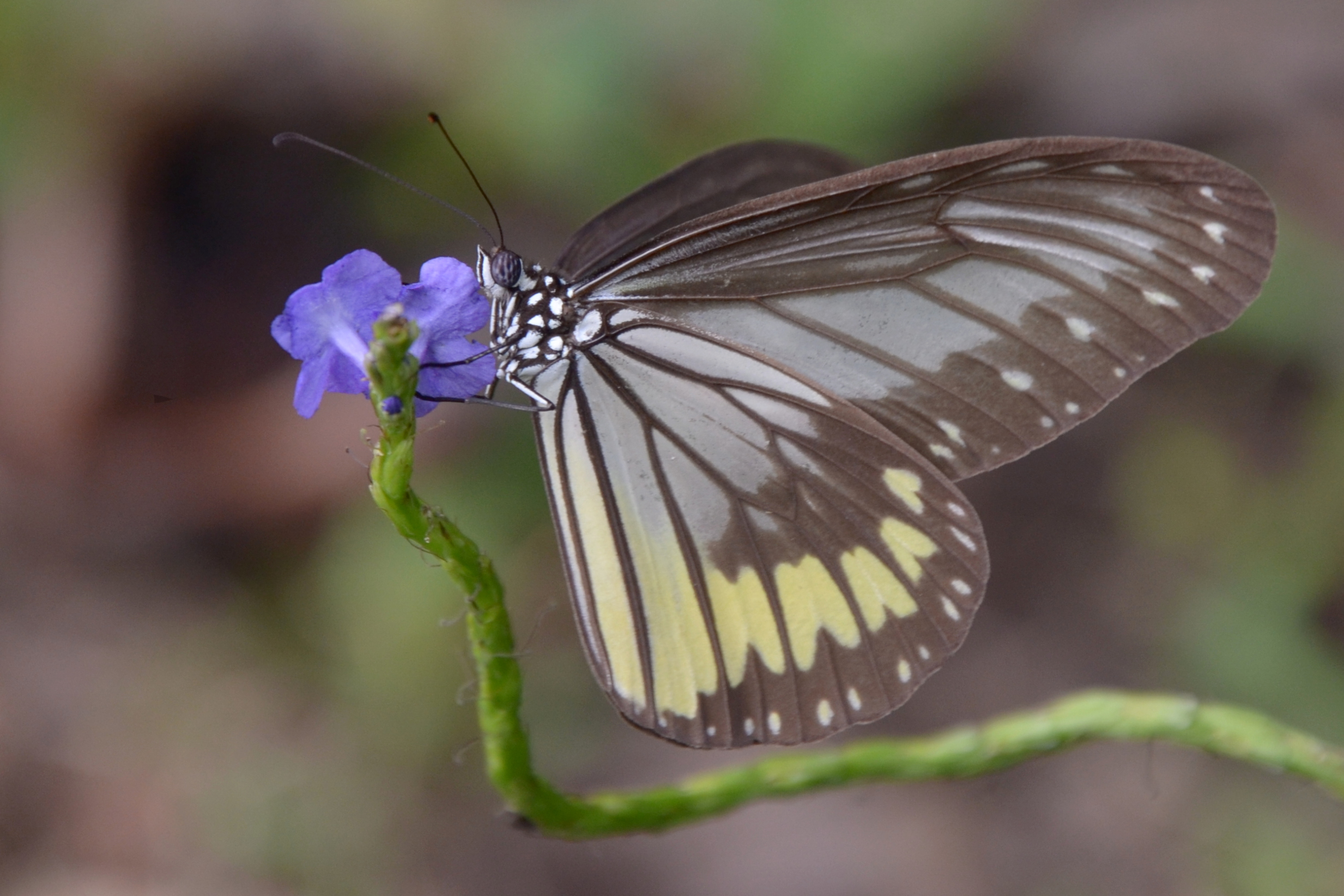

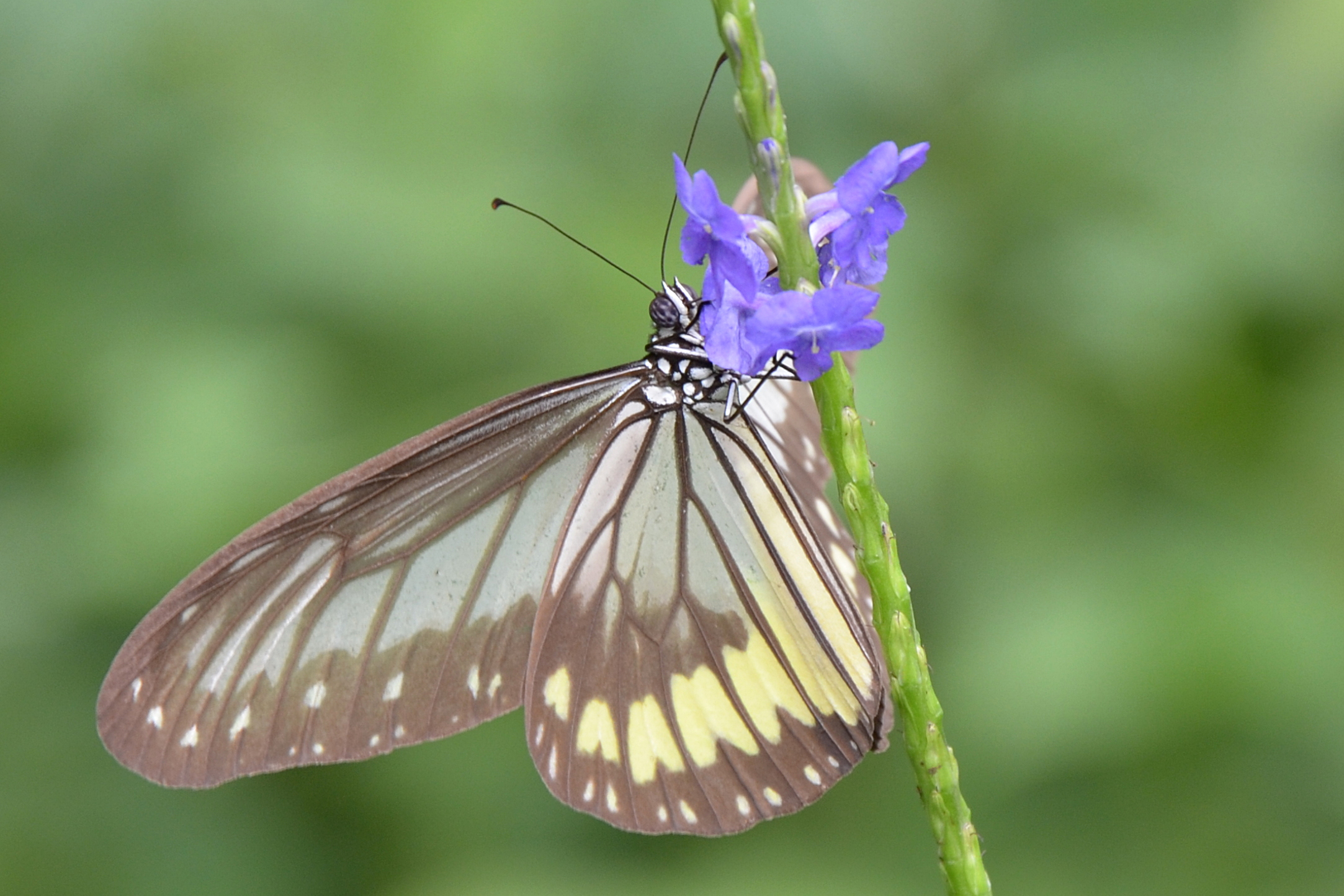

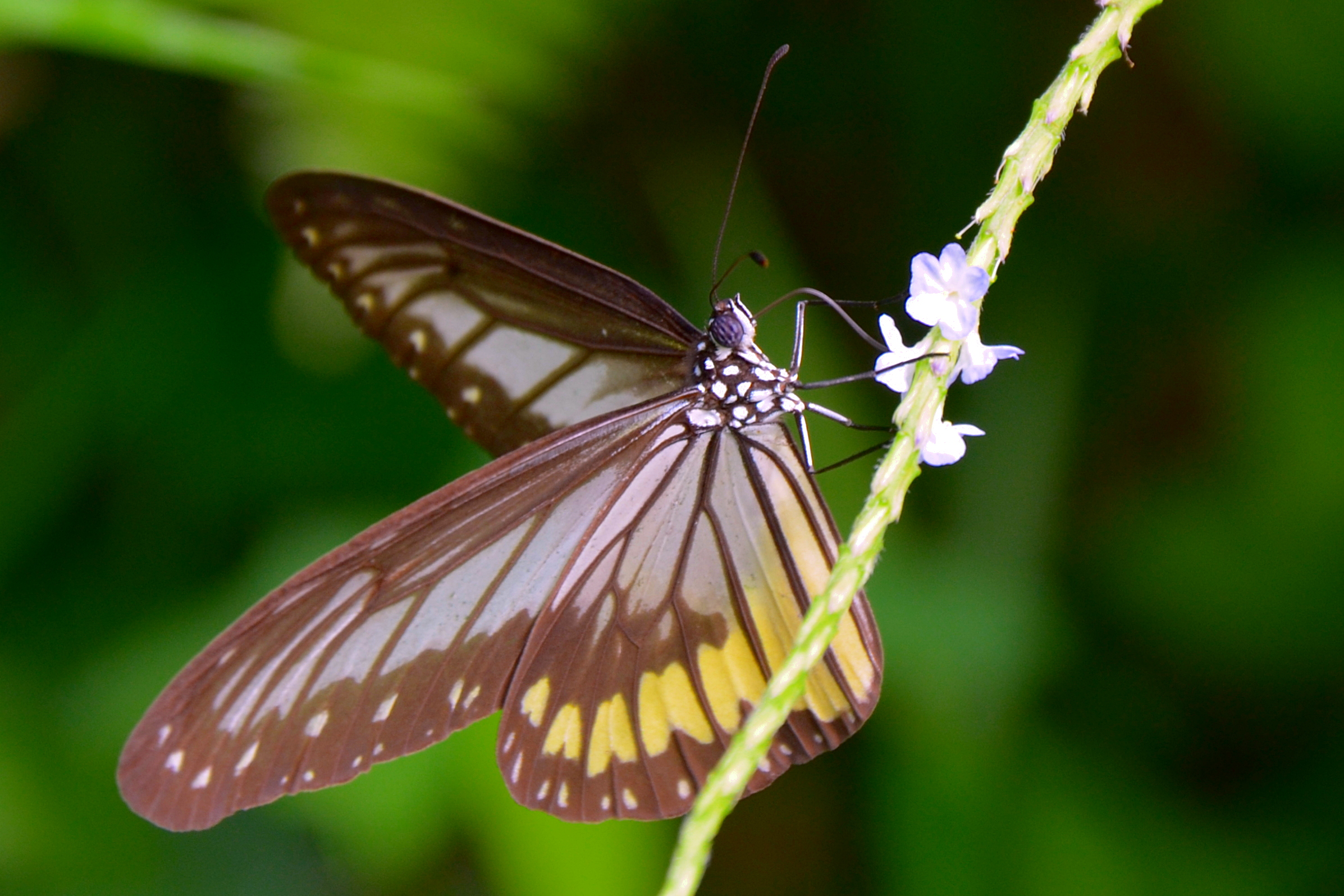
