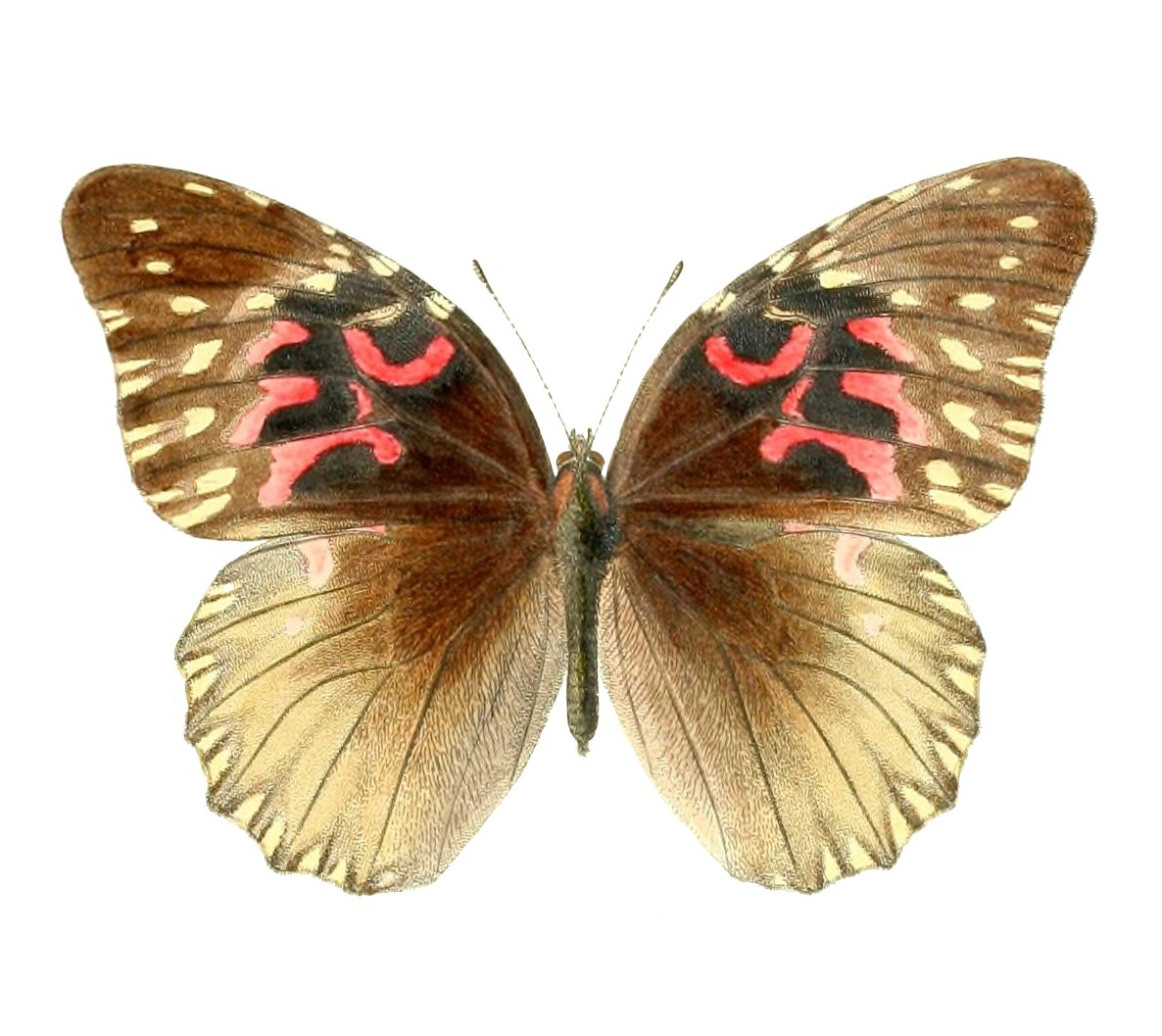
- Anetia thirza

Scientific classification
- Domain: Eukaryota
- Kingdom: Animalia
- Phylum: Arthropoda
- Class: Insecta
- Order: Lepidoptera
- Family: Nymphalidae
- Subtribe: Euploeina
- Genus: Anetia; Hübner, [1823]

Synonyms
- Anelia Hübner, [1823]; Clothilda Blanchard, 1840; Synalpe Boisduval, 1870; Anicia (missp.)

= Anetia =

Genus of brush-footed butterflies

Anetia is a Neotropical genus of nymphalid butterflies in the Danainae subfamily.

== Species ==
- Lesser false fritillary (Anetia briarea)
- Salvin's anetia (Anetia cubana)
- Jaeger's anetia (Anetia jaegeri)
- False fritillary (Anetia pantheratus)
- Cloud-forest monarch (Anetia thirza) (Geyer, [1833])
