= Schneider's surprise =

Conservation status
- Endangered (IUCN 2.3)

Scientific classification
- Kingdom: Animalia
- Phylum: Arthropoda
- Clade: Pancrustacea
- Class: Insecta
- Order: Lepidoptera
- Family: Nymphalidae
- Genus: Tiradelphe
- Species: T. schneideri

Binomial name
- Tiradelphe schneideri Ackery & Vane Wright, 1984

Sole species of brush-footed butterfly genus Tiradelphe

Schneider's surprise (Tiradelphe schneideri) is a species of nymphalid butterfly in the Danainae subfamily. It is monotypic within the genus Tiradelphe. It is endemic to the Solomon Islands.
