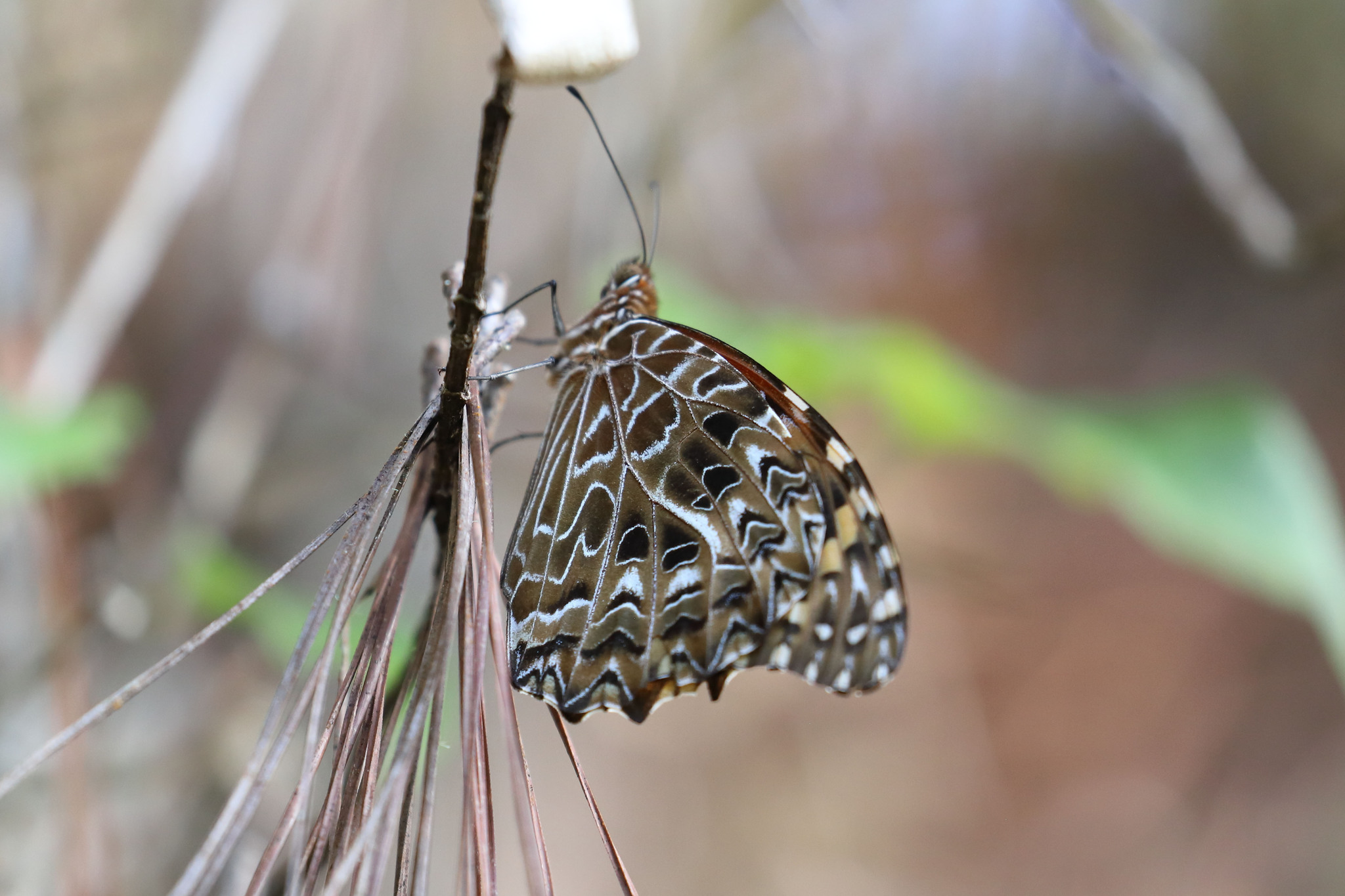

Conservation status
- Near Threatened (IUCN 2.3)

Scientific classification
- Kingdom: Animalia
- Phylum: Arthropoda
- Clade: Pancrustacea
- Class: Insecta
- Order: Lepidoptera
- Family: Nymphalidae
- Genus: Anetia
- Species: A. pantheratus

Binomial name
- Anetia pantheratus (Martyn, 1797)

= Anetia pantheratus =

Species of butterfly

Anetia pantheratus, the false fritillary, is a species of butterfly in the Danainae subfamily. It is found in Cuba, the Dominican Republic, and Haiti.
