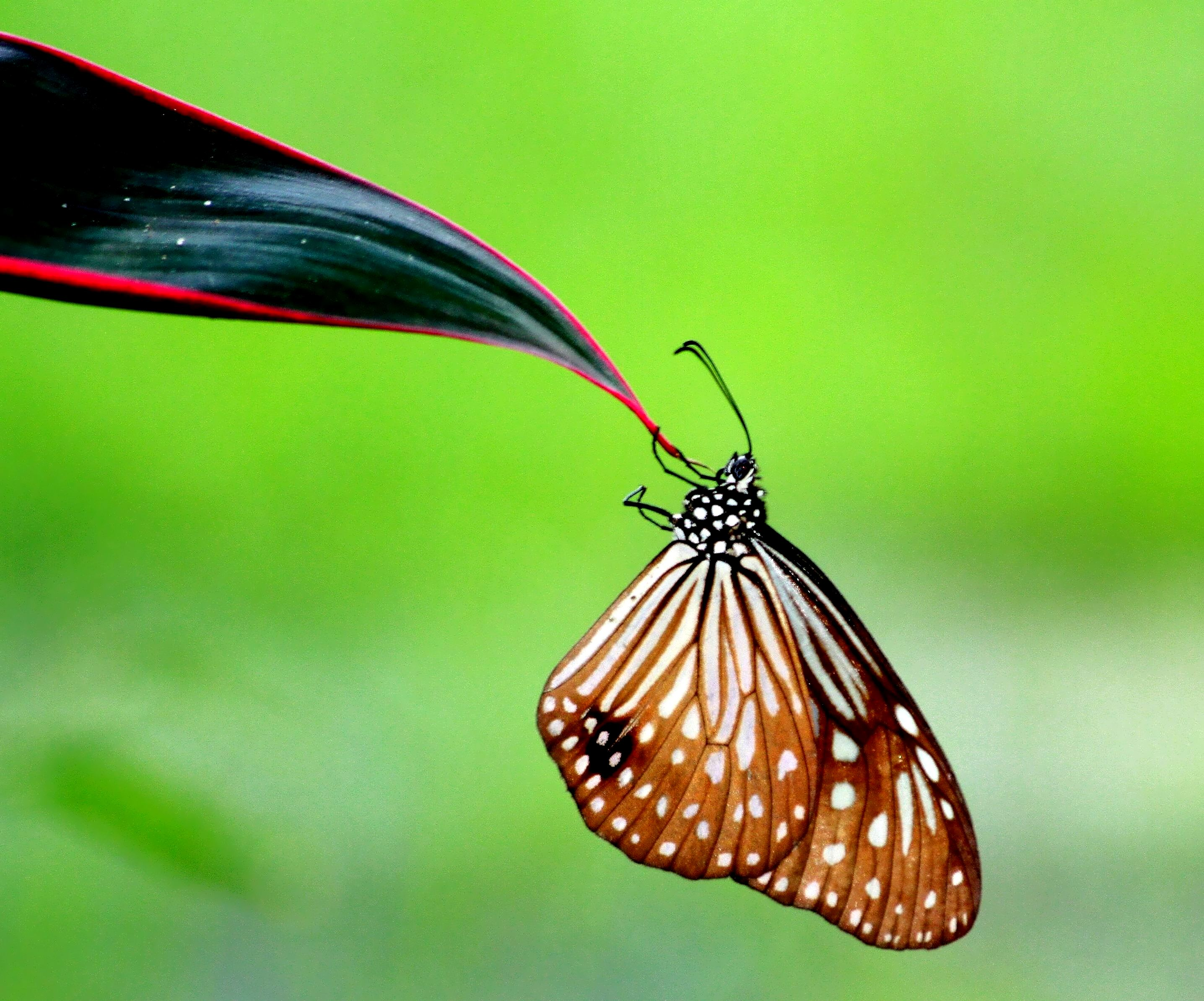
- Closed wings
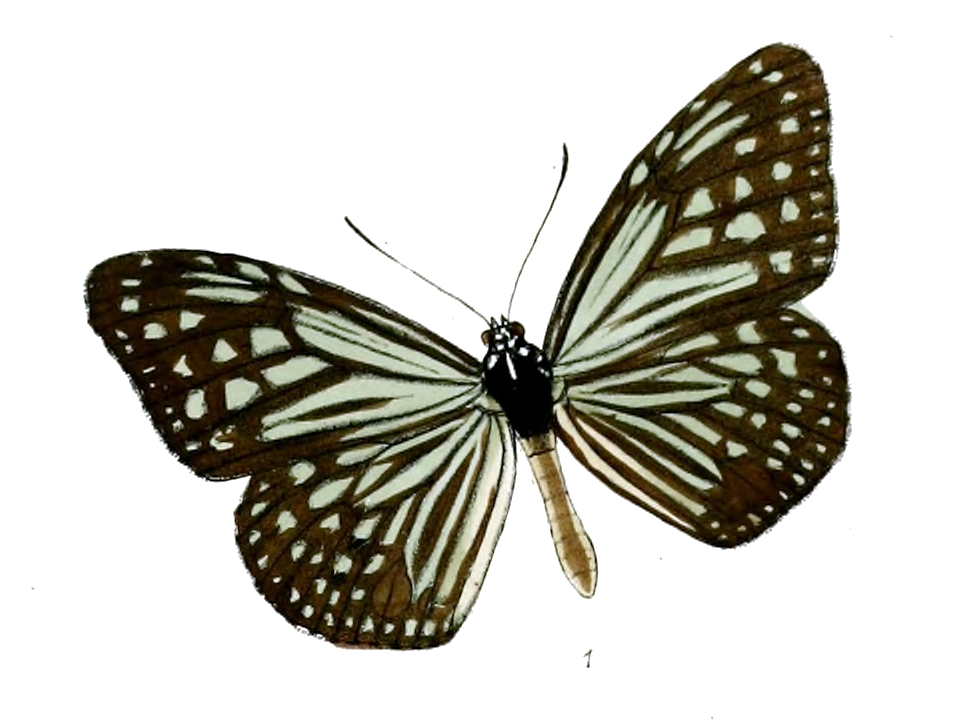
- Open wings

Scientific classification
- Kingdom: Animalia
- Phylum: Arthropoda
- Class: Insecta
- Order: Lepidoptera
- Family: Nymphalidae
- Genus: Parantica
- Species: P. agleoides

Binomial name
- Parantica agleoides (Felder & Felder, 1860)

= Parantica agleoides =

Dark glassy tiger

Species of butterfly

Parantica agleoides, the dark glassy tiger, is a species of butterfly that belongs to the danaid group (also known as crows and tigers) of the brush-footed butterflies family. It is found in India.

== Description ==
Like Parantica aglea, but differs structurally in vein 11 of forewing not being anastomosed with 12; the semihyaline streaks and spots on both forewing and hindwing are shorter and narrower, especially on the latter, where a larger area of black margin beyond the streaks is shown than in P. aglea; the short slender streak between the apices of the two cellular streaks on the hindwing is longer and always free, never joined on either to the upper or to the lower streak. On the underside the ground colour is of a browner tint than in aglea. Male sex-mark in form 2.

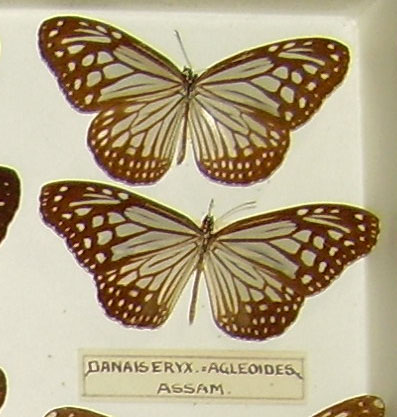

== Range ==
North-eastern India, Burma and Indomalaya until Java.

== See also ==
- List of butterflies of India
- List of butterflies of India (Nymphalidae)
