= Peduncle (botany) =

Stalk of a plant bearing an inflorescence or solitary flower

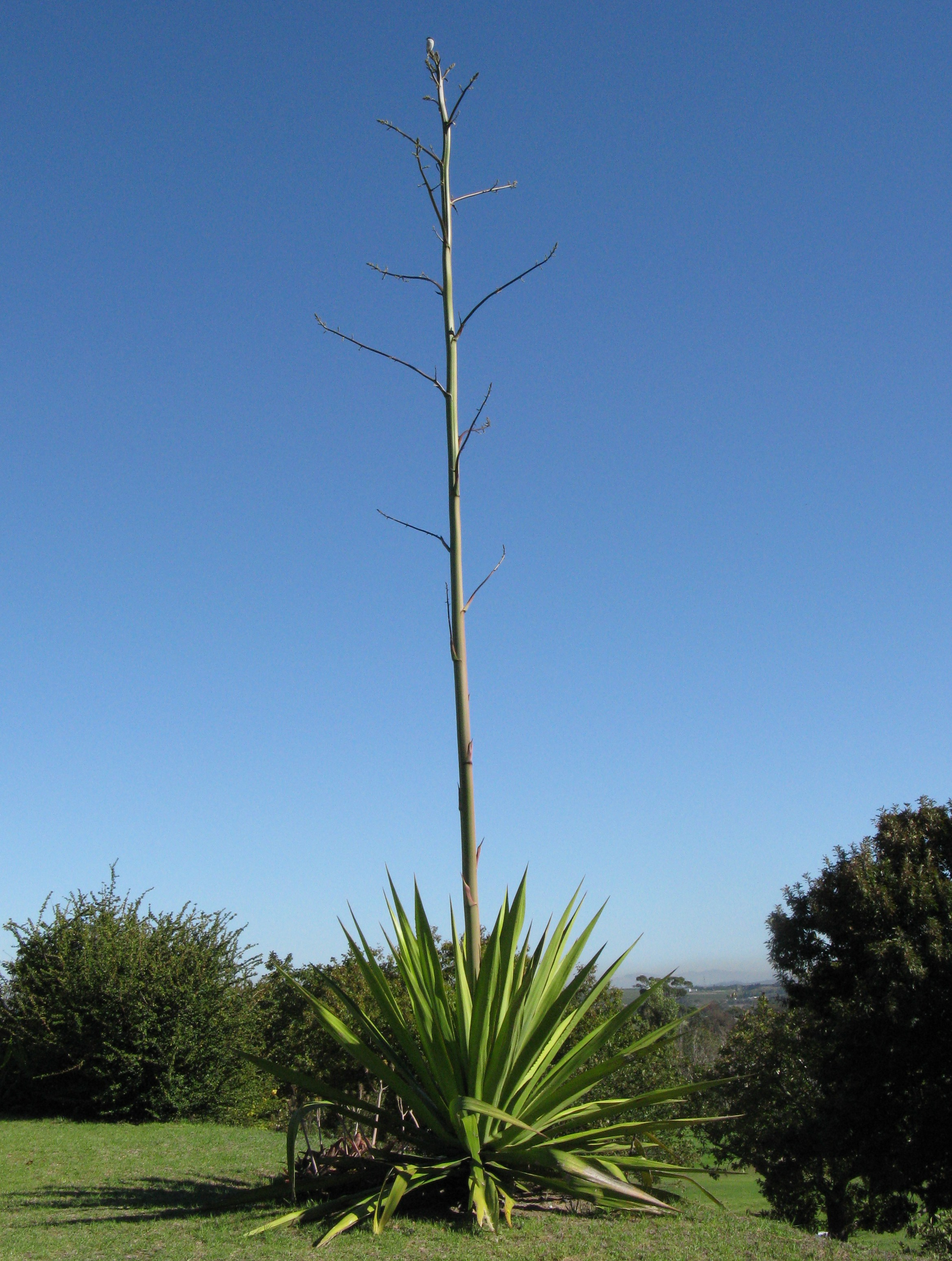
Large emergent peduncle of Agave, with bracts and branches at nodes.

In botany, a peduncle is a stalk supporting an inflorescence or a solitary flower, or, after fertilisation, an infructescence or a solitary fruit. The peduncle sometimes has bracts (a type of cataphyll) at nodes. The main axis of an inflorescence above the peduncle is the rachis, which hosts flowers (as opposed to directly on the peduncle).

== Etymology ==
The word peduncle comes from New Latin pedunculus, a diminutive of Latin pes (stem ped-), meaning "foot". Its first known use in English, in the botanical sense, dates from 1702. The related term pedicel comes from New Latin pedicellus, a diminutive of Latin pediculus. In botanical Latin, the peduncle is pedunculus.

== Related structures ==
Line drawing of a flowering shoot. The peduncle carries the whole flower cluster; each flower in the cluster has its own pedicel.

The peduncle is the primary flower stalk, supporting either a cluster of flowers or a single flower. In an inflorescence with several flowers, each flower may be carried on its own smaller stalk, the pedicel. The pedicel has been defined as a flower stalk of a second or higher order: in a raceme, for example, the principal flower stalk is the peduncle and the lateral, secondary stalks are pedicels. Both terms also apply to the corresponding stalks after fruit has formed. A flower or inflorescence without a stalk is described as sessile. The stalk that connects a leaf blade to the stem is a separate structure, the petiole.

When a peduncle arises from the ground level, either from a compressed aerial stem or from a subterranean stem (rhizome, tuber, bulb, corm), with few or no bracts except the part near the rachis or receptacle, it is referred to as a scape.

== Variation among plants ==
The acorns of the pedunculate oak (Quercus robur) are borne on a long peduncle, hence the name of the tree. In the sessile oak (Quercus petraea), the acorns sit on short stalks or have none. The two species also differ in their leaf stalks, which are short in Q. robur and long in Q. petraea.

Limes or lindens (Tilia) bear their flowers in cymes, and a large, narrow, persistent bract is fused at least to the base of the inflorescence peduncle. Because the inflorescence is usually attached near the middle of the bract, the bract acts as a wing when the fruits of most species are dispersed by wind.

In the wax plants (Hoya), the inflorescence is a raceme or umbel-like cluster, rarely a single flower, borne on a peduncle that does not arise from a leaf axil. Many species keep the peduncle, known in horticulture as a spur, after the flowers fall, and it can flower again, often repeatedly; cutting it off with the spent flowers removes a site of future flowering. A peduncle of Hoya carnosa that has already flowered can produce flowers repeatedly over several years, while Hoya pottsii produces successive flowers from the same peduncle, which keeps growing as flowering continues. The persistent peduncle of Hoya caudata carries a rachis marked with scars of previous flowerings.

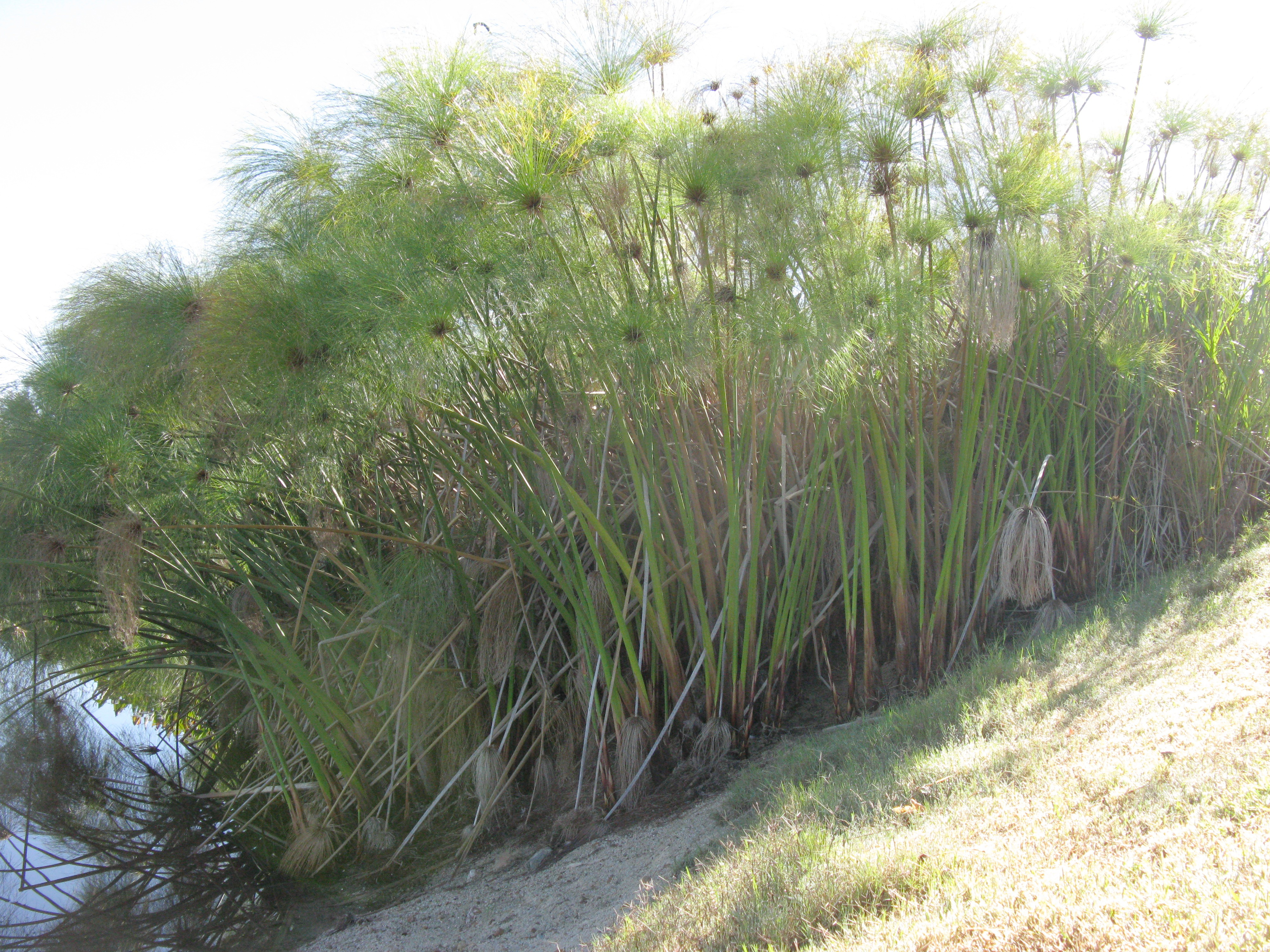
Cyperus scapes

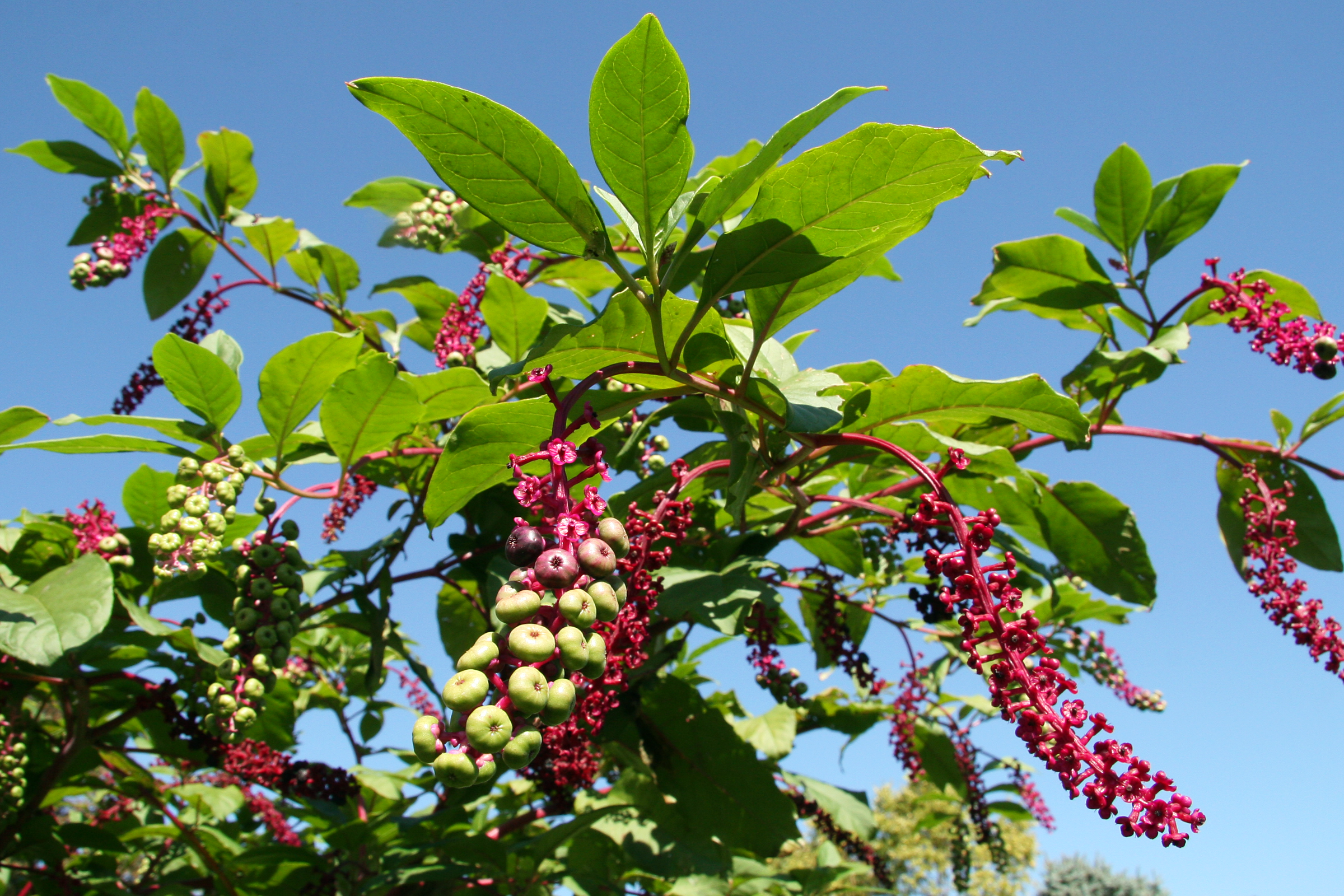
Long, magenta peduncles on an American pokeweed, each supporting a raceme

== See also ==
- Pedicel (botany)
- Scape (botany)
