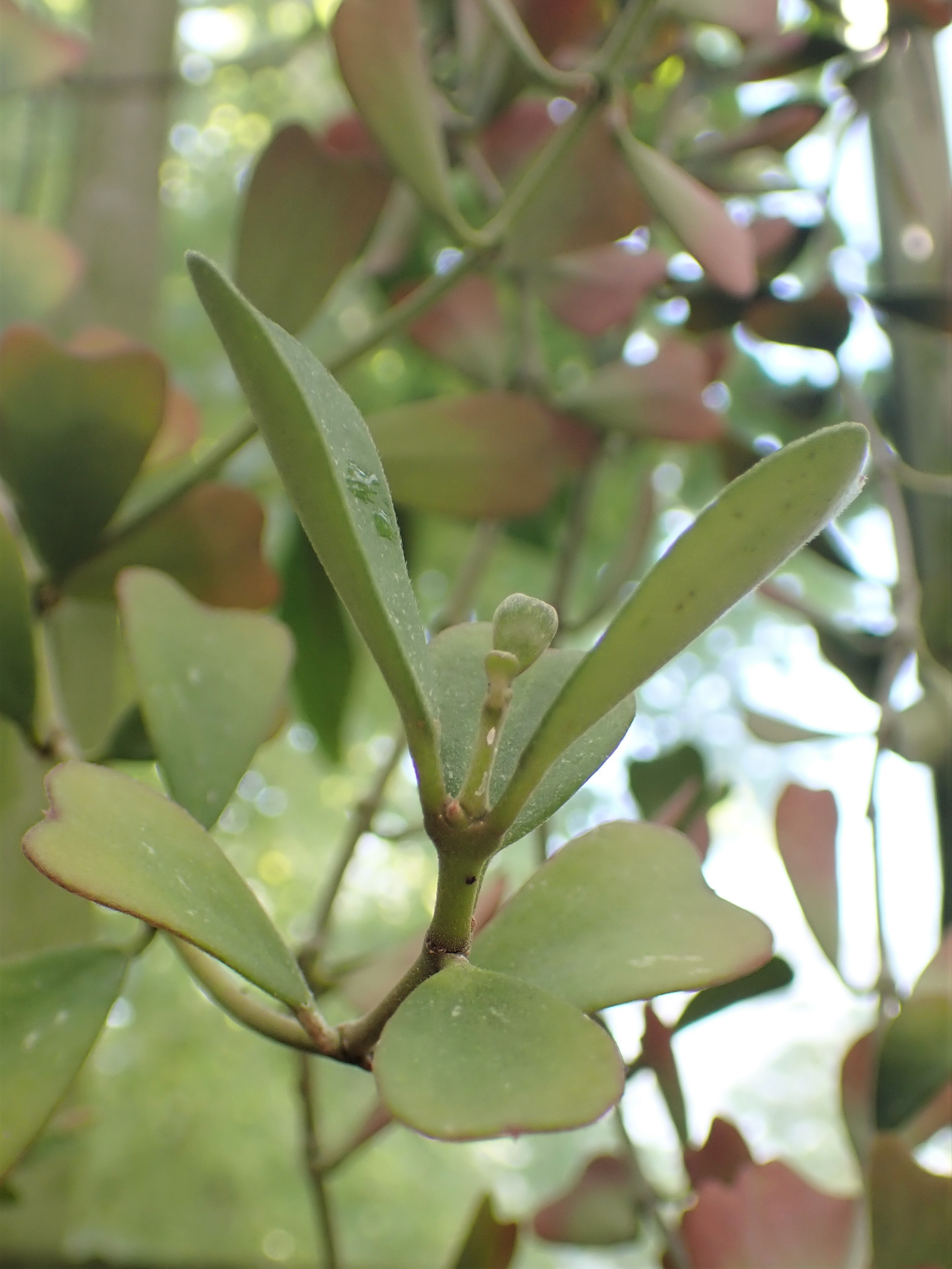

Scientific classification
- Kingdom: Plantae
- Clade: Tracheophytes
- Clade: Angiosperms
- Clade: Eudicots
- Clade: Asterids
- Order: Gentianales
- Family: Apocynaceae
- Genus: Hoya
- Species: H. manipurensis

Binomial name
- Hoya manipurensis Deb

= Hoya manipurensis =

Species of plant

Hoya manipurensis is a species of plant in the genus Hoya native to subtropical biomes from eastern Nepal to Thailand. Phylogenetic studies indicate its closest relative is Hoya carnosa.
