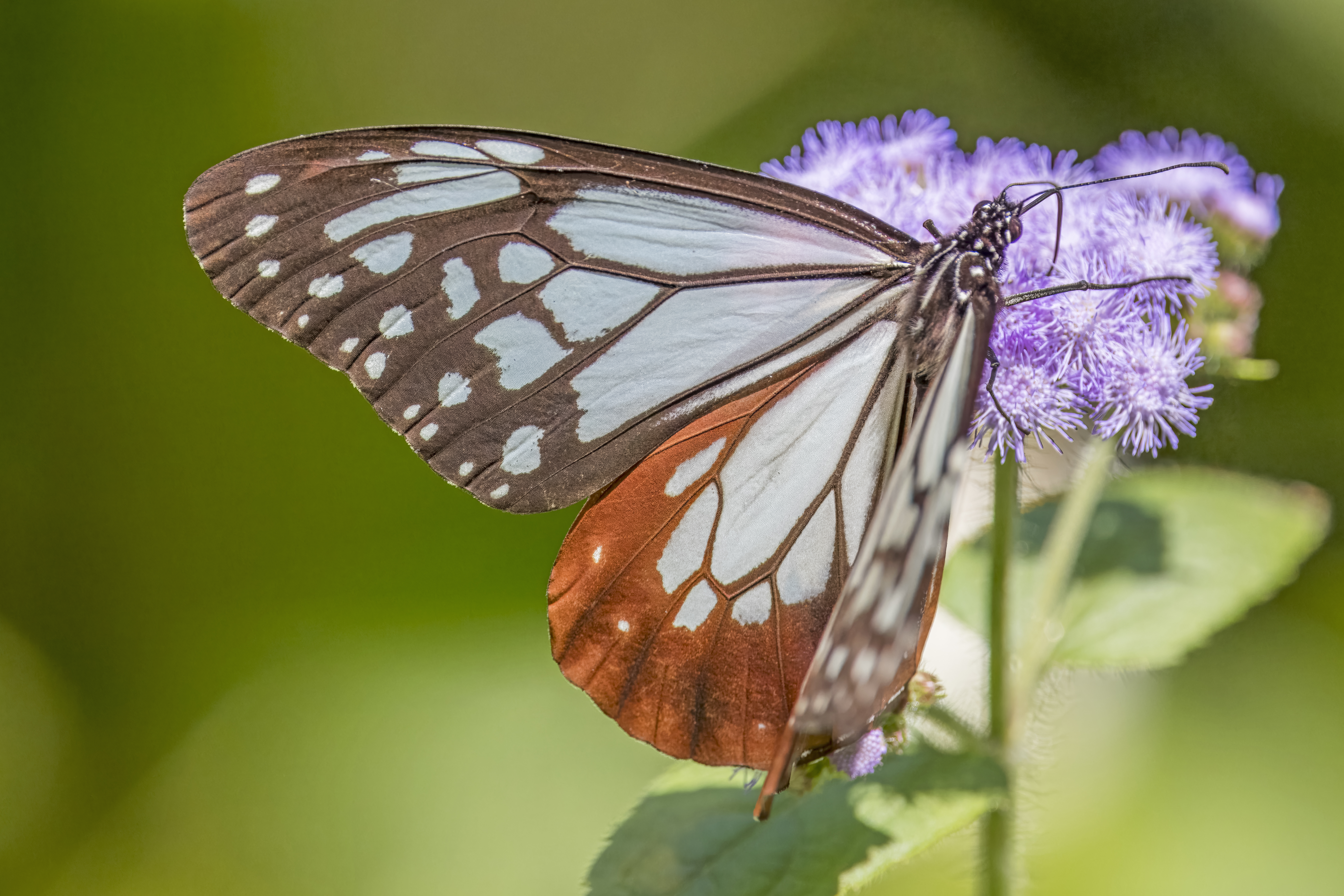

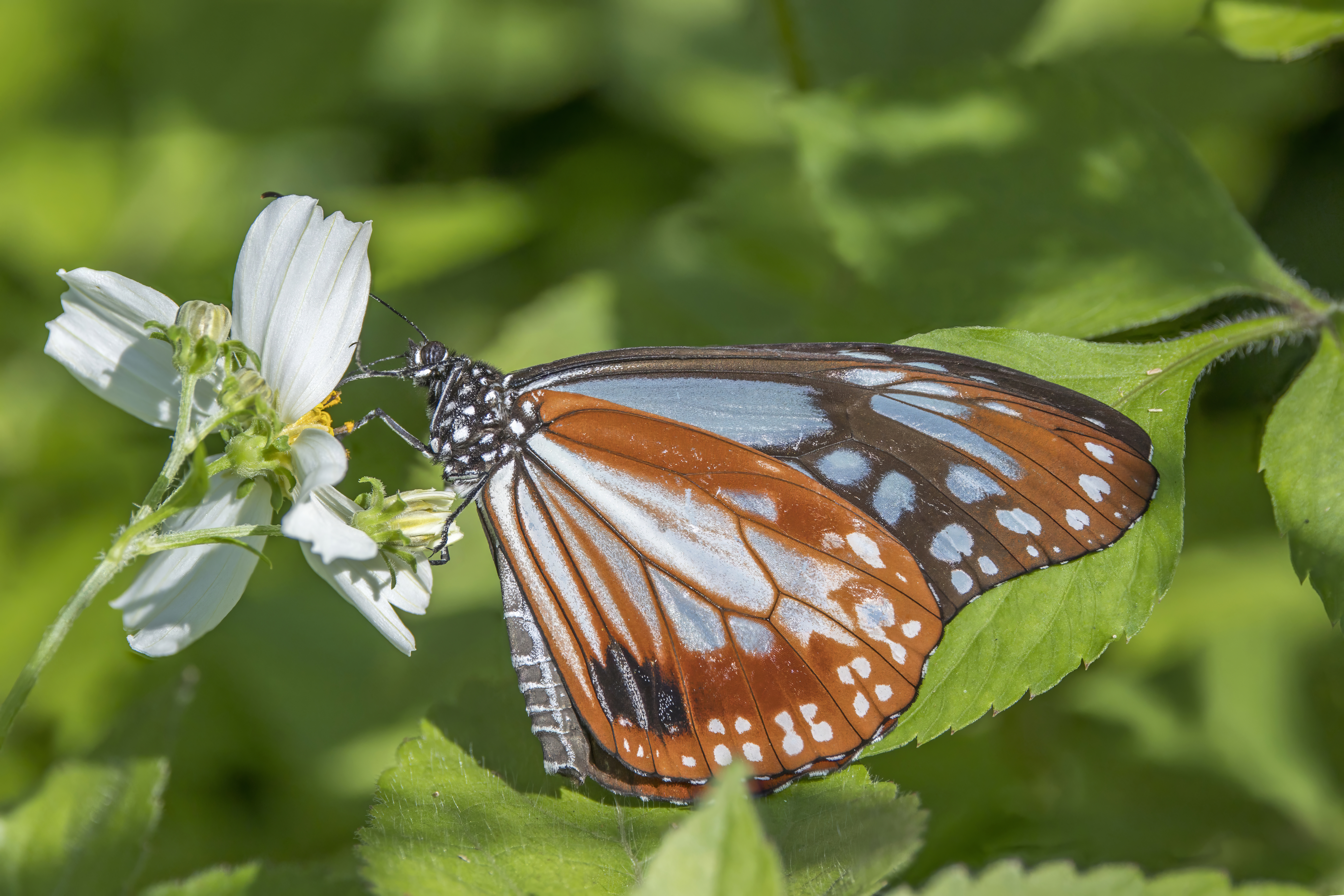
- Both P. s. niphonica

Scientific classification
- Kingdom: Animalia
- Phylum: Arthropoda
- Class: Insecta
- Order: Lepidoptera
- Family: Nymphalidae
- Genus: Parantica
- Species: P. sita

Binomial name
- Parantica sita (Kollar, 1844)

= Parantica sita =

Species of butterfly

Parantica sita (Japan - October 2024)

Parantica sita, the chestnut tiger, is a butterfly found in Asia that belongs to the crows and tigers, that is, the danaid group of the brush-footed butterflies family.

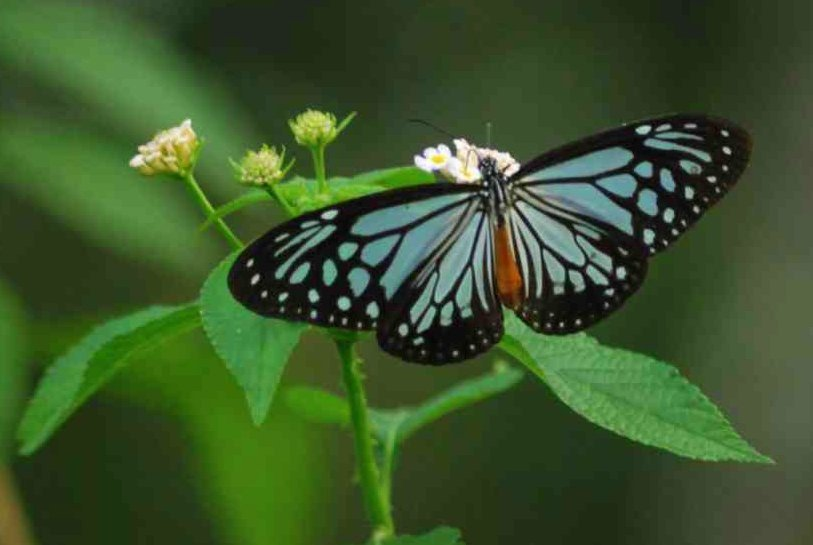
Chestnut tiger (ছিটমউল), Kolkata, West Bengal, India

== Description ==
Wings elongate, almost as in Idea. Upperside of forewing black or fuliginous black, with the following bluish-white subhyaline markings. A streak from base in interspace 1b, very broad streaks filling the basal three-fourths of interspace 1, and the whole of the cell, five very large quadrate discal spots, two long preapical streaks, three shorter streaks above them, a sub-terminal series of more or less rounded spots decreasing in size anteriorly and curved inwards opposite apex, and an incomplete subterminal series of smaller spots. Hindwing chestnut red, with subhyaline streaks and spots as follows: streaks from base, not reaching the termen in interspaces 1a and 1b, two broad streaks united to near their apex in interspace 1, a streak filling the cell, and beyond it a discal series of large inwardly pointed elongate spots and incomplete ill-defined subterminal and terminal series of spots. Underside similar, the markings clearer and more complete. Antennae black; head and thorax black, spotted with white; abdomen from brown to bright ochraceous, beneath whitish. Male secondary sex-mark in form 2.

== Distribution ==
Along the Himalayas and into the Malayan region. Northern Pakistan, Kashmir, northern India, Sikkim, Tibet, China, Taiwan, Korea, Japan, Malaya, Ussuri, Sakhalin, Indochina.

== Life history ==
Larva: On emergence a dirty white colour with transverse lines on each segment, two somewhat long and thin tentacles or processes on the third, and two shorter ones on the twelfth segment. When fully fed the larva is about 1.5 inches (38 mm) long, the ground colour is of a pale yellowish green, with two rows of dorsal and a row on each side of lateral yellow spots, the head is black with grey spots on the face, the legs black.

Pupa: pale emerald green with golden-yellow spots. From eggs laid in September the imago issued in the following April.

Food plants: Marsdenia roylei, W Asclepias curassavica, Cynanchum caudatum, C. grandifolium, C. sublanceolatum, Hoya carnosa, Marsdenia tinctoria, M. tomentosa, Metaplexis spp., Tylophora aristolochioides, Vincetoxicum polyanthum (syn. Tylophora floribunda), T. japonica, T. ovata, T. tanakae.

== Cultural references ==
- In March 1987 DPR Korea issued a postage stamp depicting Parantica sita.
