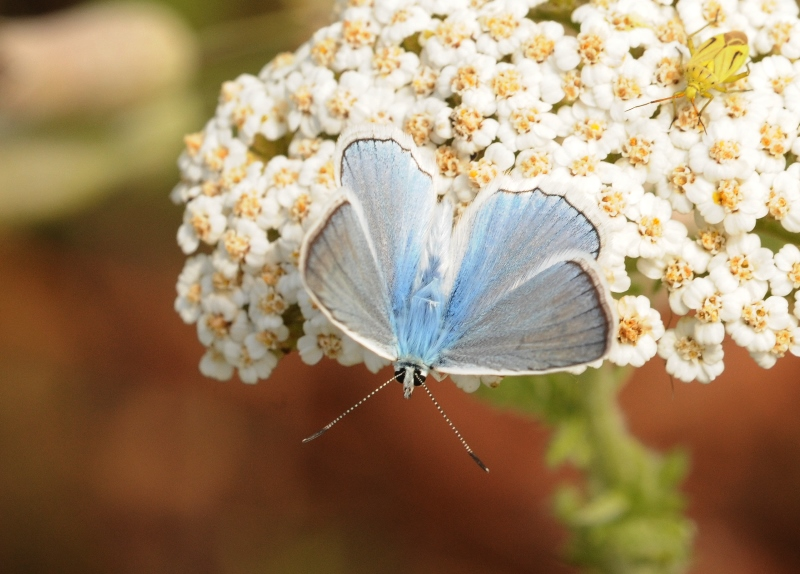
- Male, upperface
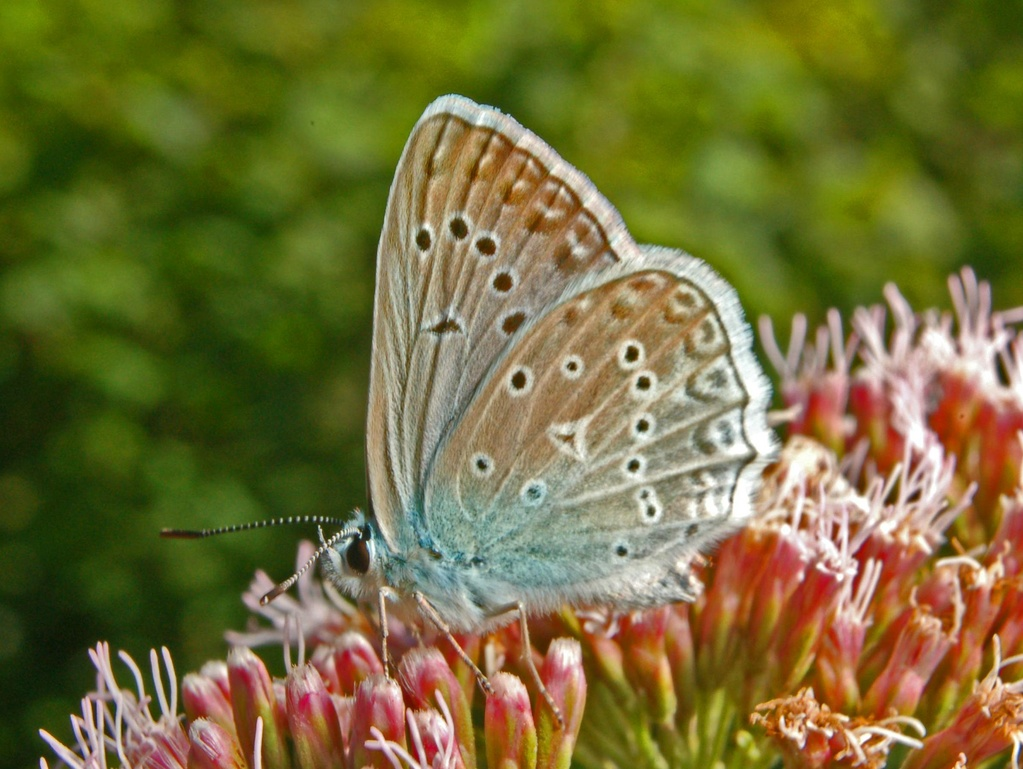
- Male, underface

Scientific classification
- Domain: Eukaryota
- Kingdom: Animalia
- Phylum: Arthropoda
- Class: Insecta
- Order: Lepidoptera
- Family: Lycaenidae
- Genus: Polyommatus
- Species: P. daphnis

Binomial name
- Polyommatus daphnis (Denis & Schiffermüller, 1775)

Synonyms
- Papilio daphnis Denis & Schiffermüller, 1775; Meleageria daphnis (Denis & Schiffermüller, 1775); Papilio meleager Esper, 1779

= Polyommatus daphnis =

Species of butterfly

Polyommatus daphnis, the Meleager's blue, is a butterfly of the family Lycaenidae.

== Subspecies ==
Subspecies include:

- Polyommatus daphnis daphnis – (South Eastern Europe, Crimea, South Urals)
- Polyommatus daphnis elamita (Le Cerf, 1913) – (Kurdistan, Elburs, Talysh)
- Polyommatus daphnis hayesi (Larsen, 1974) – (Lebanon)
- Polyommatus daphnis versicolor (Heyne, 1895) – (Caucasus Minor, Armenia)

== Distribution ==
This species can be found in Eastern and Southern Europe and Western Asia, ranging from Southern Poland to the Balkans, Lebanon, Syria, Iran, Southern Urals, Turkey, Caucasus and Transcaucasia.

== Habitat ==
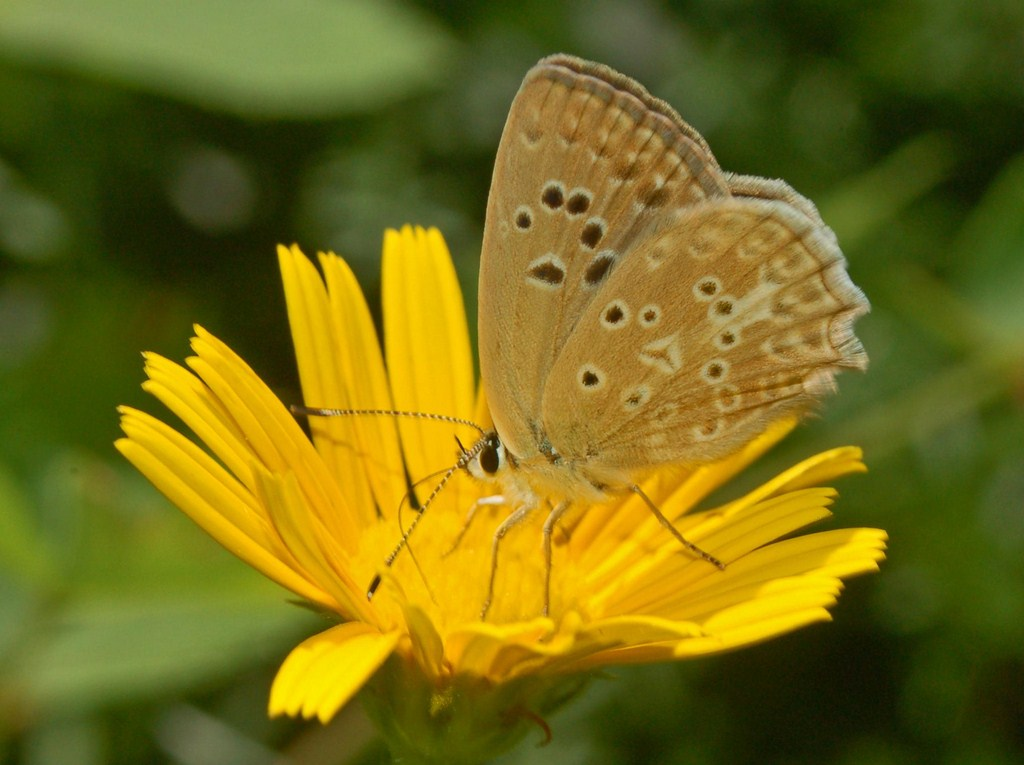
Polyommatus daphnis. Female, underface

These butterflies inhabit grassy and bushy areas, clearings in scrubland and open flowery meadows in hills, at an elevation of 200–1,700 metres (660–5,580 ft) above sea level.

== Description ==
Polyommatus daphnis has a wingspan of 36–38 millimetres (1.4–1.5 in). These small butterflies present a sexual dimorphism. The upperside of the wings is bright blue in males, while in the females it is usually blue bordered with dark brown. The underside of the wings tends to be pale ocher in the females and grey-bluish in the males, with black spots surrounded by white. The hindwings are distinctly scalloped, especially in the females.

== Description in Seitz ==
L. meleager Esp. (= daphnis Bgstr., female = endymion Schiff.) (81 a). male very large and very light sky-blue, strongly glossy, with a very narrow black margin. Underside pale grey-brown, with the base dusted with blue, the ocelli but little prominent and those near the margin of the hindwing very weak. Female at once recognized by the dentate anal portion of the outer margin. From Central and South Germany, Switzerland and South France throughout South-East Europe and Asia Minor to Syria and Kurdistan. – ab. limbopunctata Schulz are males with black marginal spots on the upperside. ab. steeveni Trk. (81 a) are strongly darkened females, which have a very wide distribution among ordinary specimens, but are more frequently found in the East, in Greece, Asia Minor, etc. – versicolor Ruhl-Heyne is a form from Mesopotamia with the upperside very light blue and the marginal spots of the underside entirely obsolete. – ignorata Stgr. [= P. d. versicolor (Rühl, 1895)](81 a), from Akbes in the south-western Taurus, is very peculiar as regards colour; the upperside of the female is traversed by many shadowy streaks situated on the veins; the hindwing of the male is likewise dentate in the anal portion, while in the female the teeth are so strong that they form 2–3 short tails. – Larva green with yellow swellings; spiracles black. Until June on Thymus, Orobus, Astragalus, and Coronilla. The butterflies in July and August; they are partial to limestone soil and occur singly in hot valleys, more in the hills and plains than in the mountains; on meadow-flowers, singly.

== Biology ==
It is a univoltine species. The butterflies fly from June to August. The larvae feed on horseshoe vetch, sainfoin and Securigera varia. Larvae are attended by ants (Lasius alienus, Formica pratensis, Tapinoma erraticum).

== Etymology ==
Named in the Classical tradition. In Greek mythology, Meleager was a hero venerated in his temenos at Calydon in Aetolia. Daphne a minor figure, is a naiad. Alternatively Daphnis in Greek mythology is a shepherd poet.

== Gallery ==
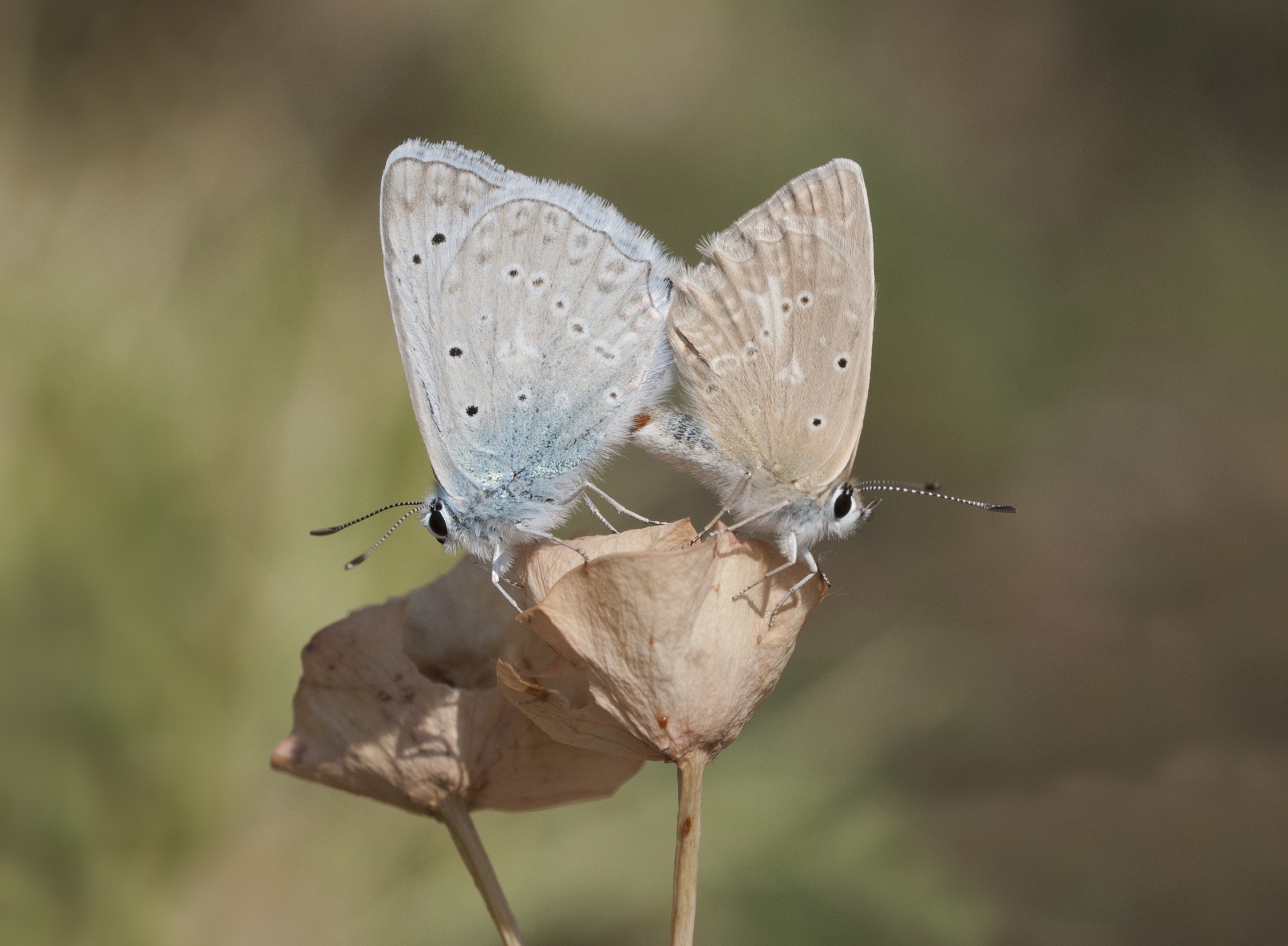
Mating pair

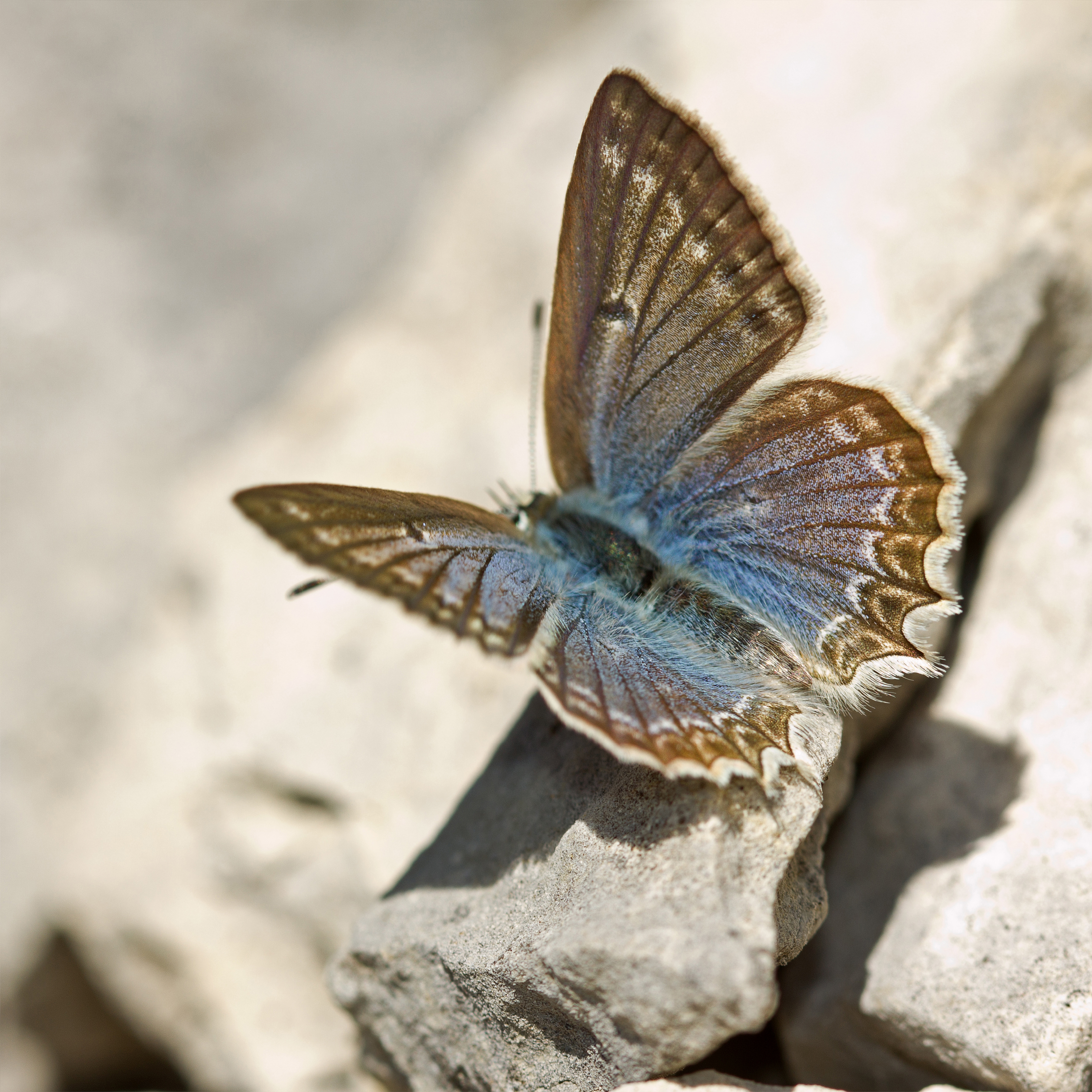
Female, upperface

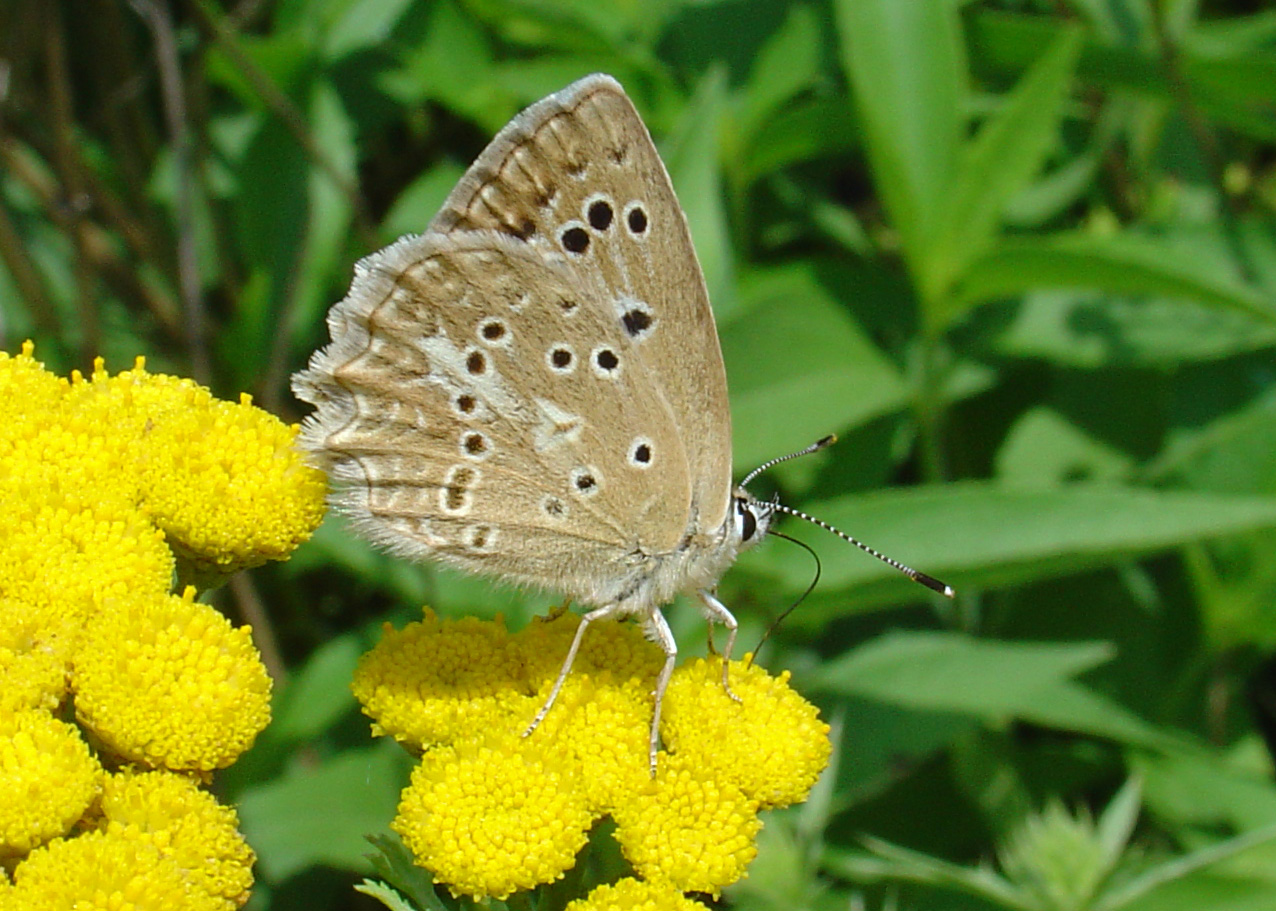
Female, underface

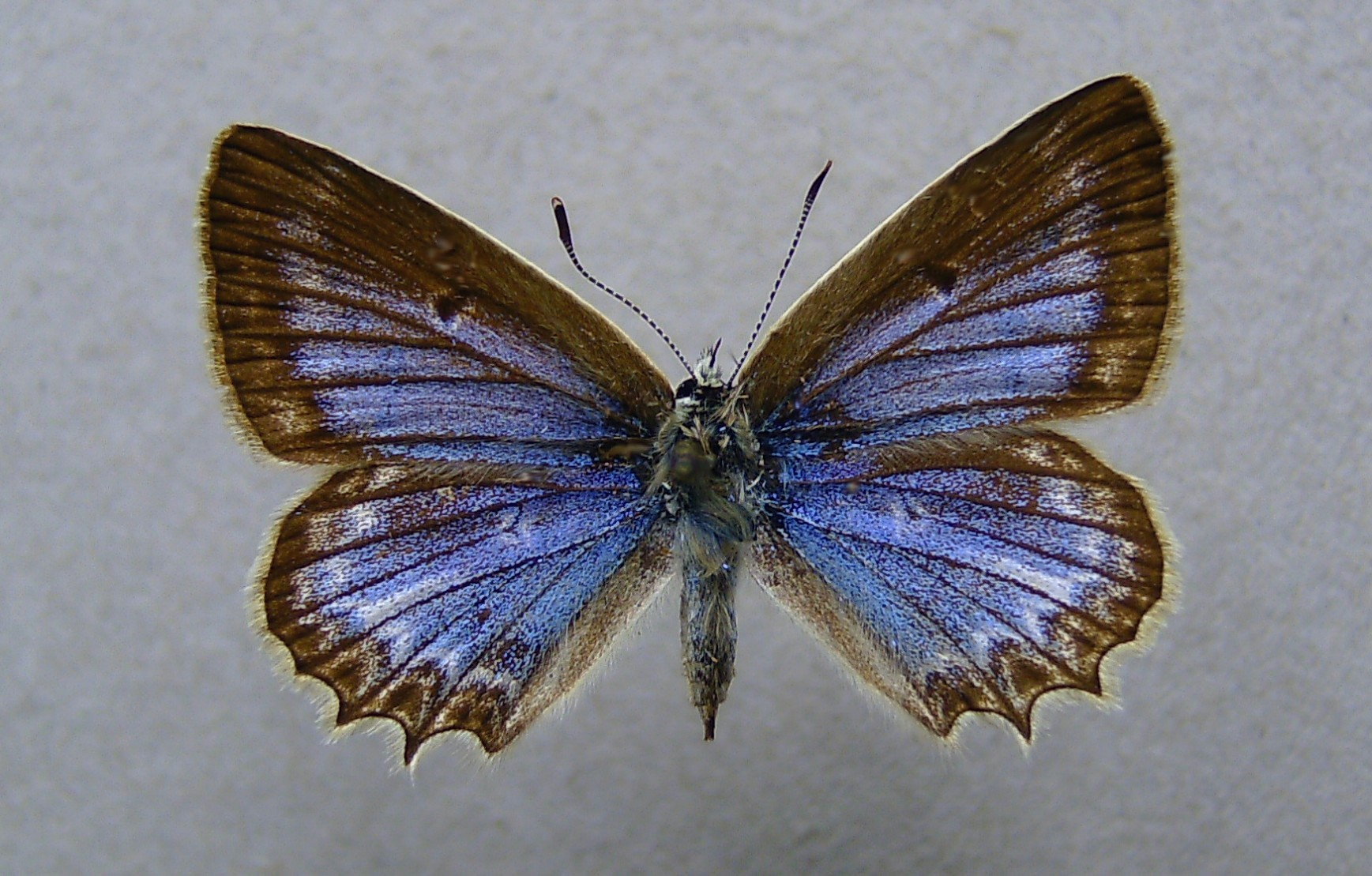
Mounted specimen, female

== Bibliography ==
- LepIndex: The Global Lepidoptera Names Index. Beccaloni G.W., Scoble M.J., Robinson G.S. & Pitkin B.
- Tom Tolman et Richard Lewington, Guide des papillons d'Europe et d'Afrique du Nord, Delachaux et Niestlé, 1997 (ISBN 978-2-603-01649-7)
- Otakar Kudrna: The distribution atlas of European butterflies. In: oedippus. Band 20. Apollo Books, Stenstrup Danmark 2002, ISBN 87-88757-56-0, S. 258.
- Chris A. M. van Swaay & Martin S. Warren: Red Data Book of European Butterflies (Rhopalocera), Nature and Environment, No. 99, Council of Europe Publishing, Strasbourg, 1999
