= Solarium (myrmecology) =

Earthen structure created by certain species of ants

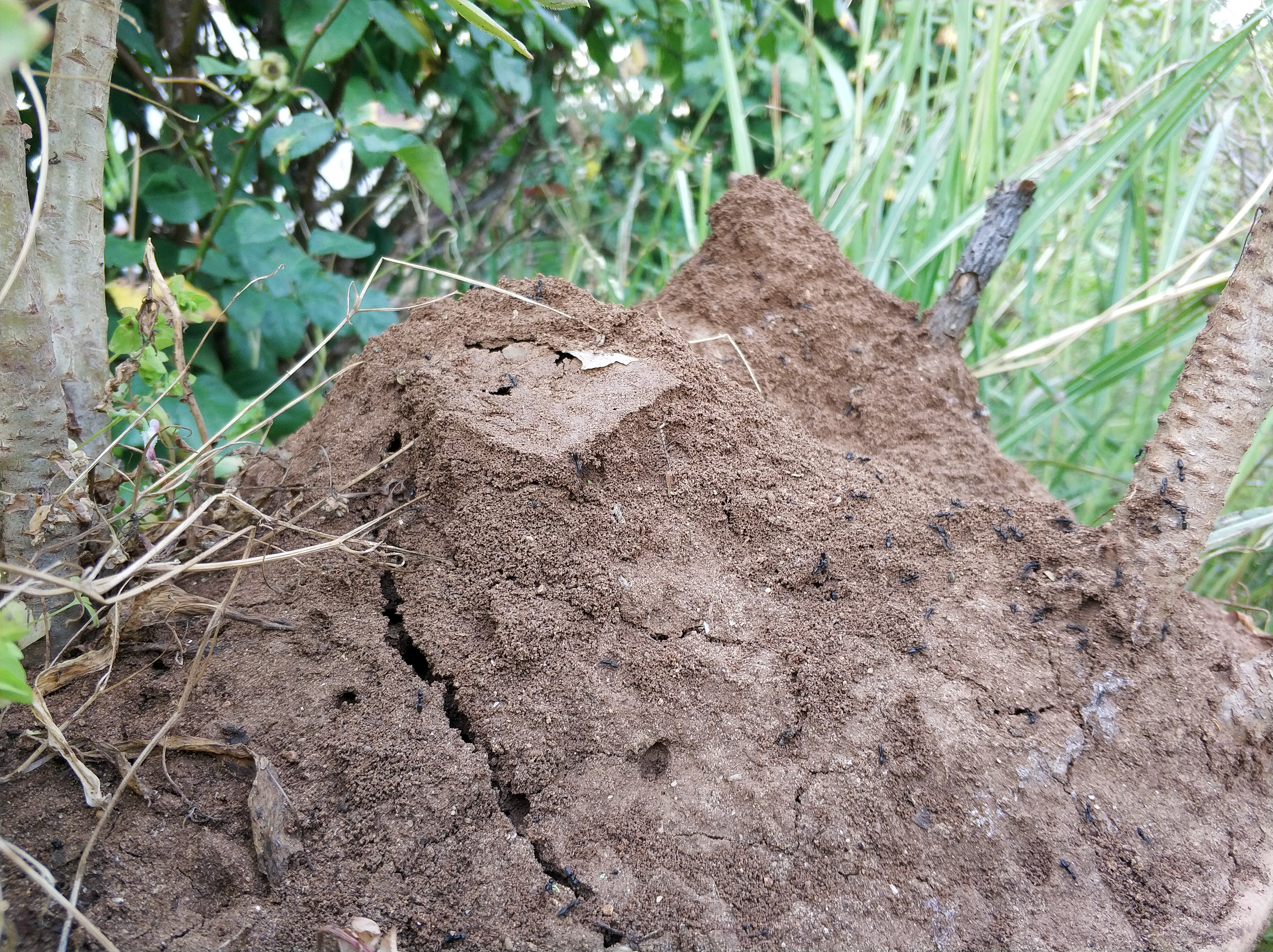
a Solarium of Tapinoma israele

In myrmecology, a solarium is an above-ground earthen structure constructed by some ant species for the purpose of nest thermoregulation and brood incubation. Solaria are usually dome-shaped and fashioned from a paper-thin layer of soil, connected to the main nest by way of subterranean runs. Some species, such as Formica candida, construct solaria using plant materials.

Tapinoma erraticum is an example of a solaria-constructing species whose skill at so doing was noted by Horace Donisthorpe in the early 20th century in his book British Ants, their Life Histories and Classification.
