= Spur (stem) =

Type of plant stem

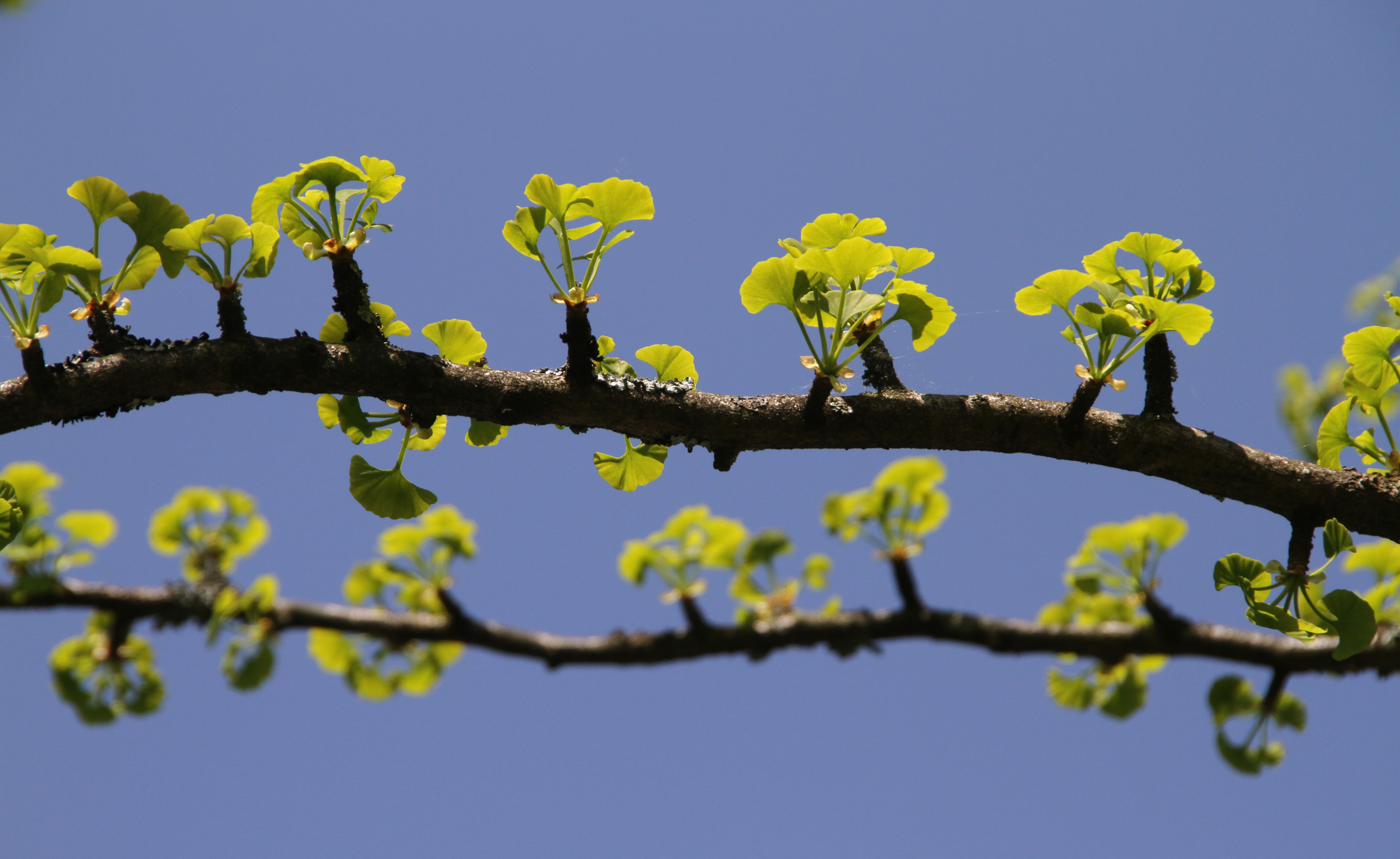
Brachyblasts and first year axils of Ginkgo

Spurs, or brachyblasts, are short, slow growing stems with greatly shortened internodes that can bear leaves, flowers and fruit. Spurs are perennial growths and commonly arise from the leaf axils on shoots.

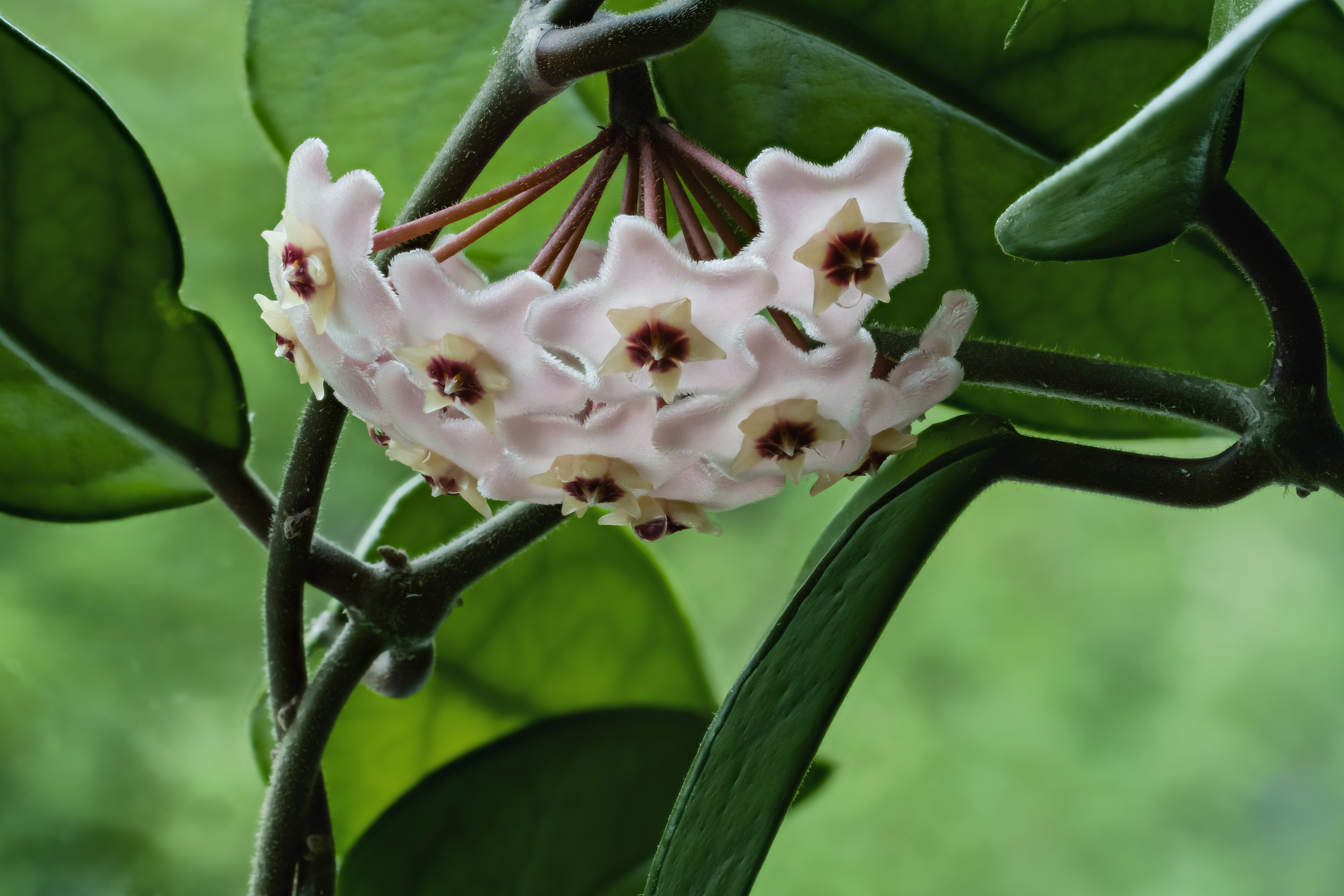
Hoya carnosa inflorescence spurs

They are common in fruit trees such as apple, pear, plum and almond. The spurs have horticultural importance. For example, the number of spurs on an almond (Prunus dulcis) tree is highly connected to the overall almond yield.

Ginkgo develops spurs from first-year leaf axils, and in subsequent years these produce clusters of leaves and eventually cones. Porcelainflower Hoya carnosa produces spurs for its inflorescences as well.
