= Tapinoma israele =

Scientific classification
- Domain: Eukaryota
- Kingdom: Animalia
- Phylum: Arthropoda
- Class: Insecta
- Order: Hymenoptera
- Family: Formicidae
- Subfamily: Dolichoderinae
- Genus: Tapinoma
- Species: T. israele

Binomial name
- Tapinoma israele Forel, 1904

Species of ant

Tapinoma israele is a species of ant in the genus Tapinoma. Described by Forel in 1904, the species is endemic to Algeria and Israel. Tapinoma israele is one of the fewest species that build Solaria during the winter.

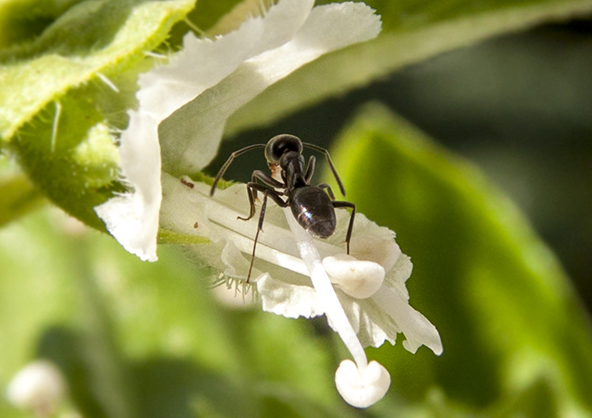
Tapinoma israele on Basil flower

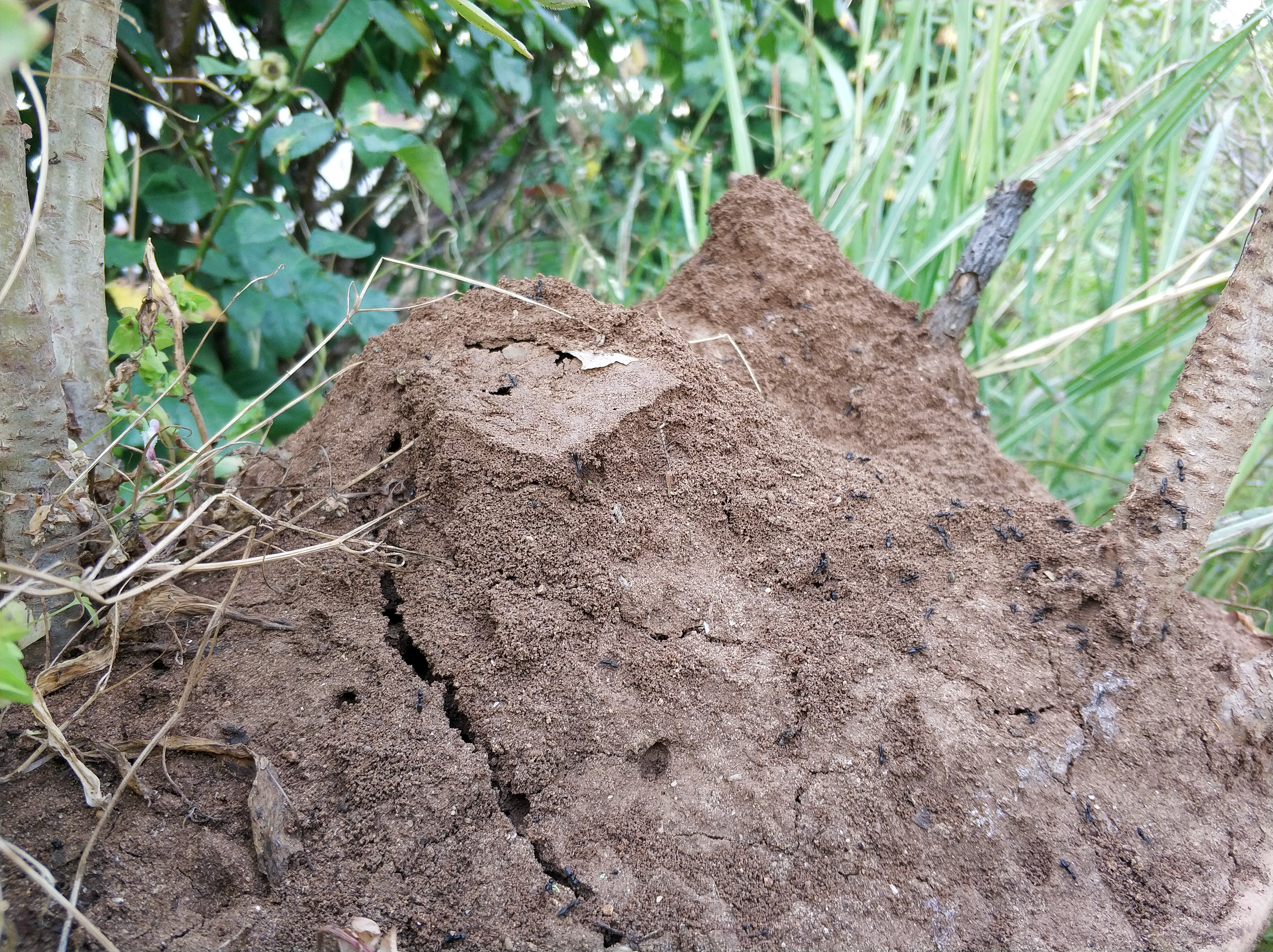
Solarium of Tapinoma israele

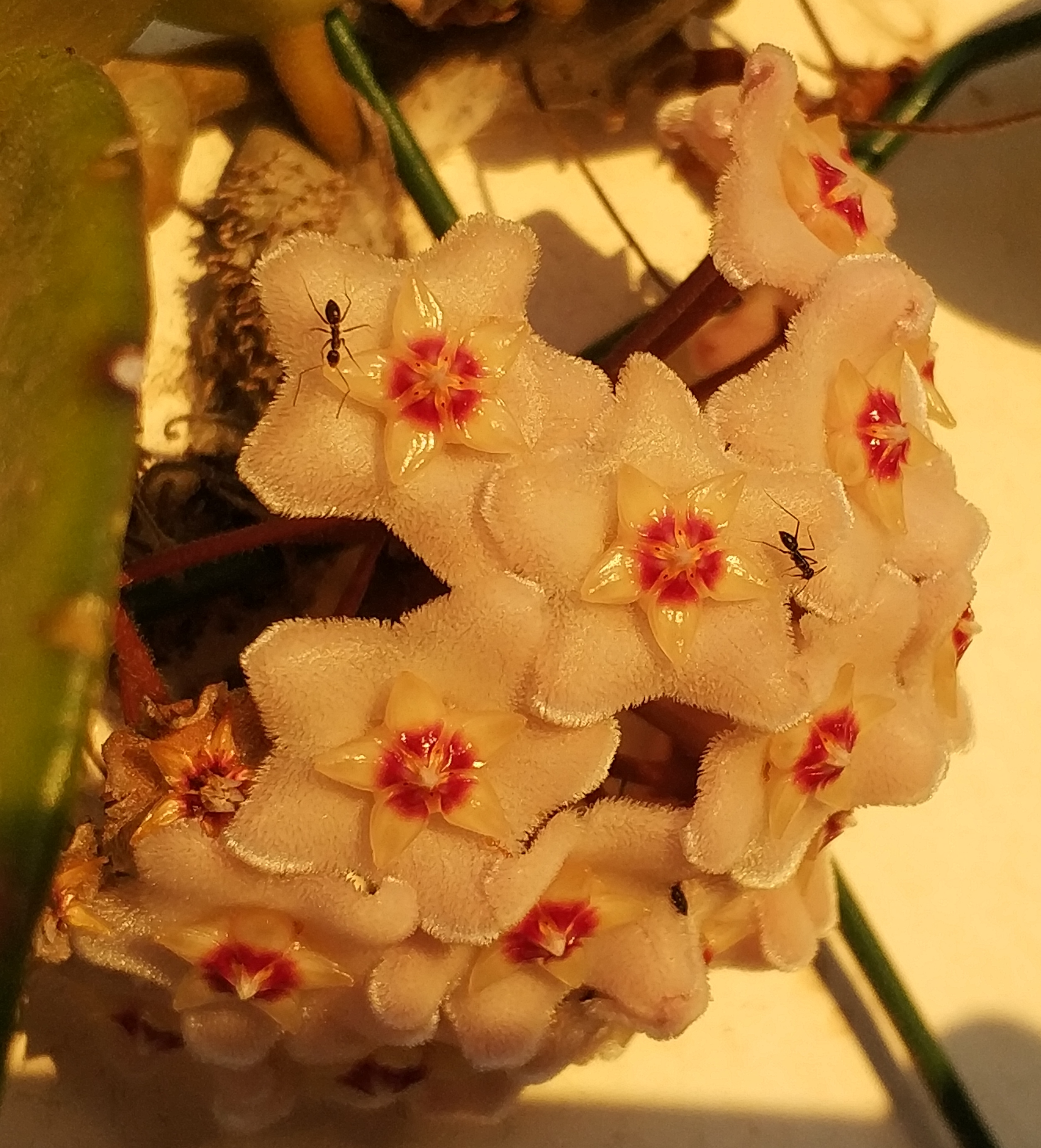
Tapinoma israele drinking nectar of Hoya carnosa
