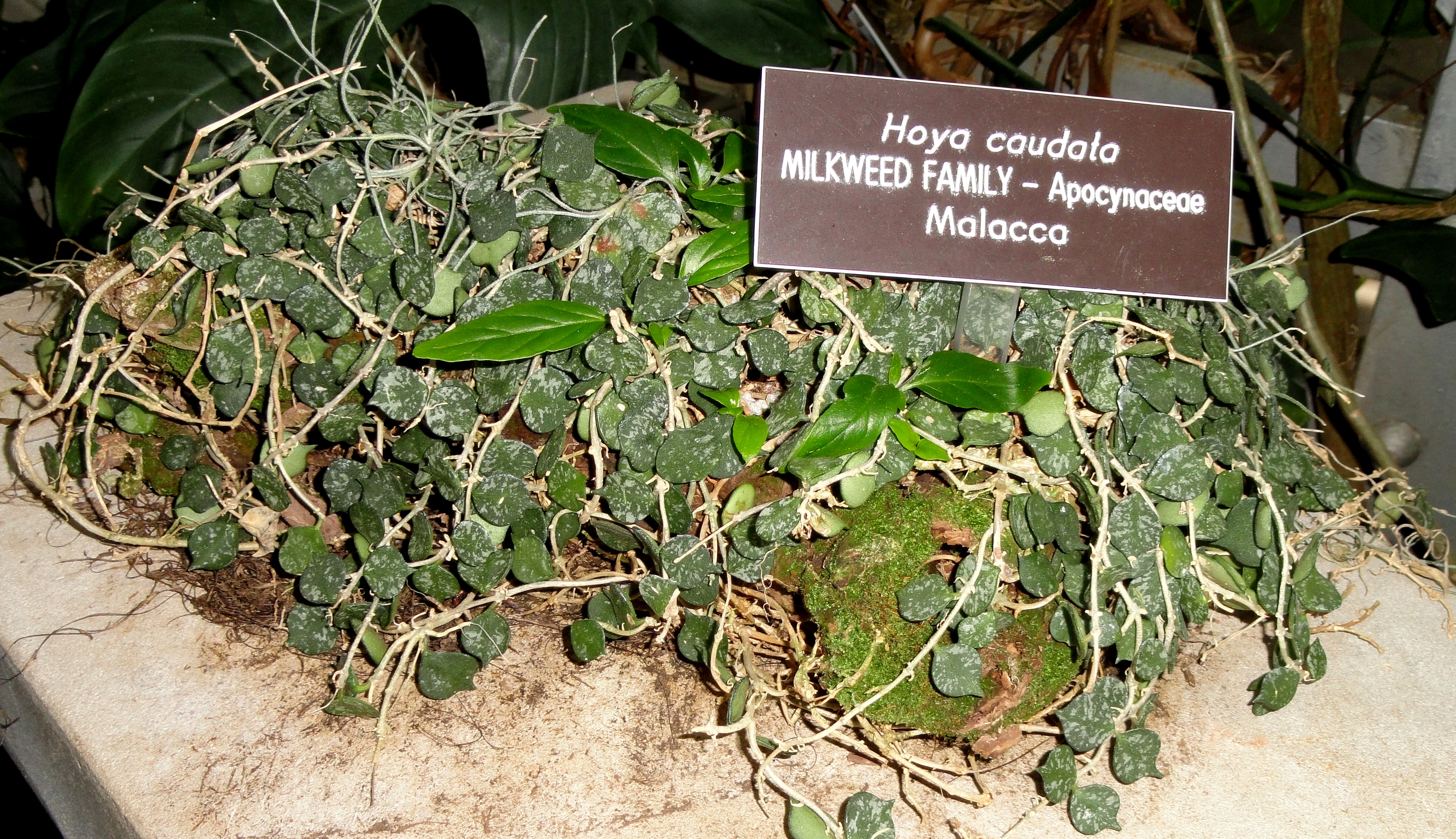

Scientific classification
- Kingdom: Plantae
- Clade: Embryophytes
- Clade: Tracheophytes
- Clade: Angiosperms
- Clade: Eudicots
- Clade: Asterids
- Order: Gentianales
- Family: Apocynaceae
- Genus: Hoya
- Species: H. curtisii

Binomial name
- Hoya curtisii Hook.f.

= Hoya caudata =

Species of plant

Hoya caudata is a species of Hoya native to Southern Thailand to West Malesia.

== See also ==
- List of Hoya species
