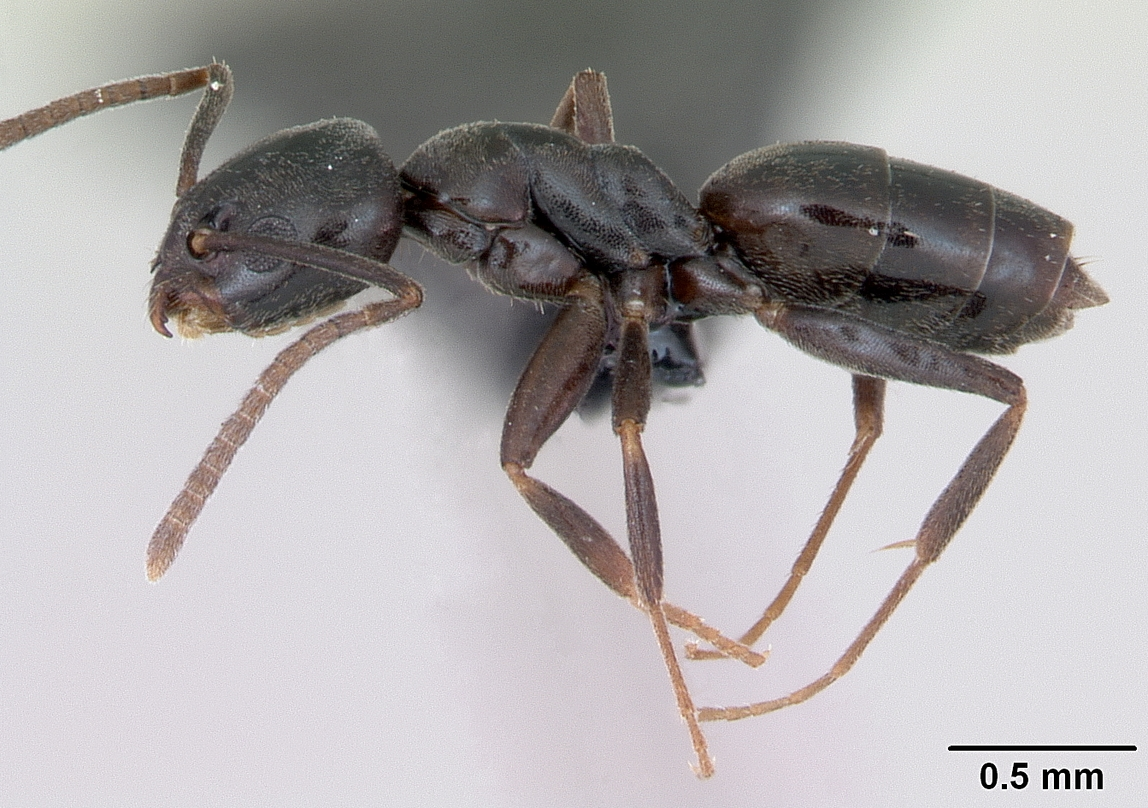

Scientific classification
- Kingdom: Animalia
- Phylum: Arthropoda
- Clade: Pancrustacea
- Class: Insecta
- Order: Hymenoptera
- Family: Formicidae
- Subfamily: Dolichoderinae
- Genus: Tapinoma
- Species: T. erraticum

Binomial name
- Tapinoma erraticum Latreille, 1789

= Erratic ant =

Species of ant

The erratic ant (Tapinoma erraticum) is a species of dolichoderine ant first described in 1789 by Latreille.

This species ranges throughout central Europe from the mountains of southern Italy to northern Germany. It is present in coastal areas of southern England and on the islands of Gotland and Öland in Sweden.

A thermophilic species, T. erraticum is found principally on dry heathland, exposed to the sun. The workers are very agile, and are usually only seen when the sun is shining, and the species can easily be distinguished from superficially similar species (e.g. Lasius niger) by its tendency to hold its gaster almost vertically when moving. Horace Donisthorpe commented: "When the sun is obscured these ants immediately disappear, and on cold and cloudy days very few specimens are to be found away from the nest."

Colonies are usually small, although larger colonies occasionally occur. Donisthorpe records having found a particularly large colony in Weybridge on July 29, 1913, in which "the deälated females and workers in this nest being the largest I have ever seen".

Colonies are polygynous and have been recorded to contain up to 40 deälated females. Nests are shallow and small solaria often feature in nest structure to concentrate solar heat onto the ants' brood.

Nuptial flights take place in June, although they may be postponed during colder years to July.
