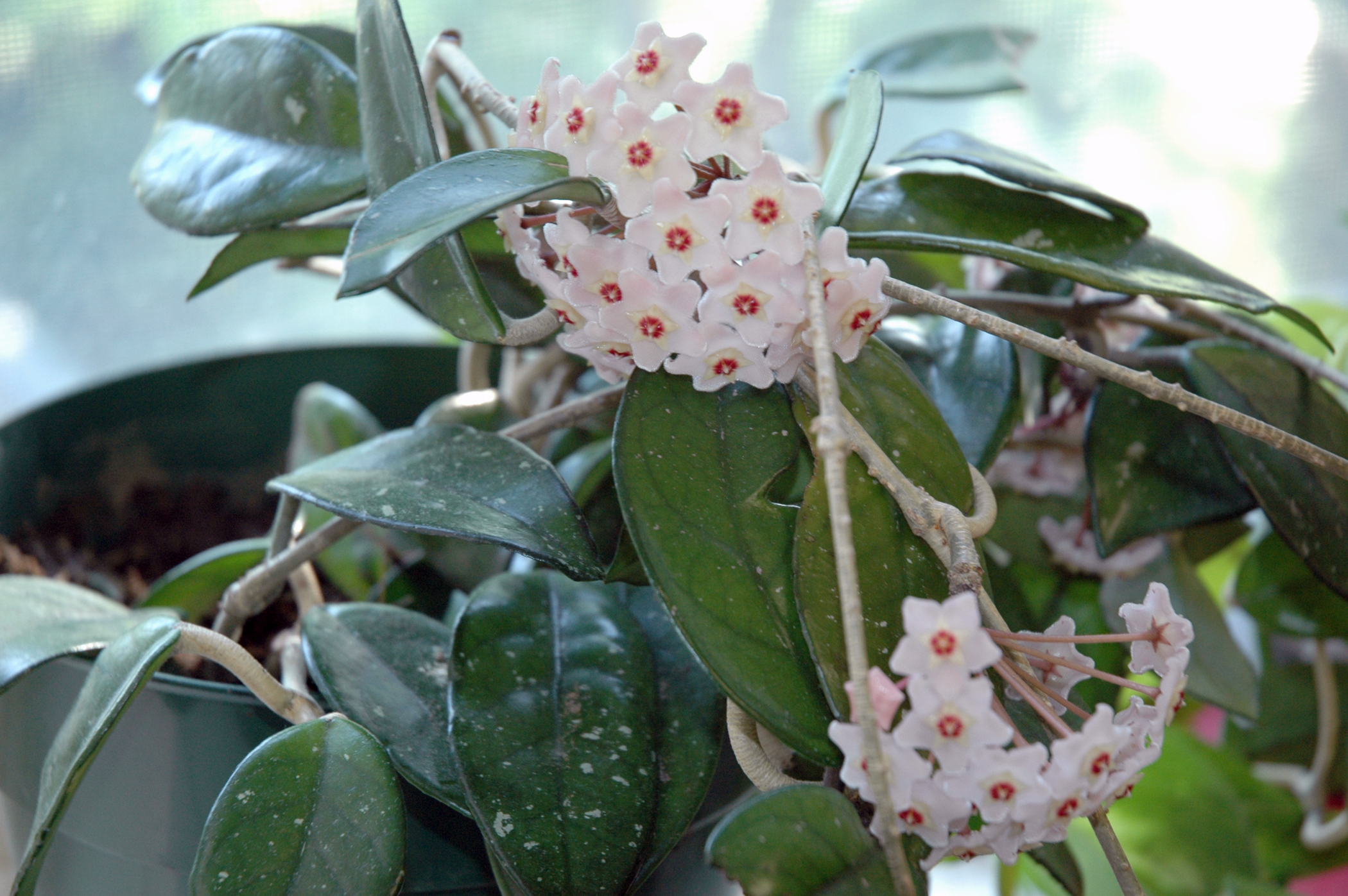

Scientific classification
- Kingdom: Plantae
- Clade: Tracheophytes
- Clade: Angiosperms
- Clade: Eudicots
- Clade: Asterids
- Order: Gentianales
- Family: Apocynaceae
- Genus: Hoya
- Species: H. carnosa

Binomial name
- Hoya carnosa (L.f.) R.Br.

Synonyms
- List: Asclepias carnosa L.f.; Hoya chinensis (Lour.) Traill; Hoya compacta C.M.Burton; Hoya crassifolia (J.Jacq.) Haw.; Hoya intermedia A.C.Sm.; Hoya laurifolia Miq.; Hoya motoskei Teijsm. & Binn.; Hoya picta Siebold ex C.Morren; Hoya rotundifolia Siebold; Hoya skinneriana Kloppenb.; Hoya variegata Siebold ex C.Morren; Schollia chinensis (Lour.) J.Jacq.; Schollia crassifolia J.Jacq.; Stapelia chinensis Lour.

= Hoya carnosa =

Species of plant

Hoya carnosa, the porcelain flower or wax plant, is a species of flowering plant in the family Apocynaceae, native to East Asia. It is a common house plant grown for its attractive waxy foliage, and sweetly scented flowers. It is grown well in pots and hanging baskets.

Hoya carnosa has been in cultivation for more than 200 years and has given rise to many cultivars that vary in foliage form or flower color. In cultivation in the UK it has gained the Royal Horticultural Society's Award of Garden Merit.

== Description ==
Hoya carnosa makes faintly succulent shoots with smooth, pale gray, and bare surfaces that twine and climb. The perennial leaves are wide oval to longitudinal oval or heart-shaped. They are slightly succulent, fleshy with a waxy glossy surface, 3–5 centimetres (1.2–2.0 in) wide and 3.5–13 centimetres (1.4–5.1 in) long, with a petiole of about 1–1.5 centimetres (0.39–0.59 in). The spindle-shaped fruits measure 6 to 10 × 0.5 to 1.5 cm.

=== Flowers ===
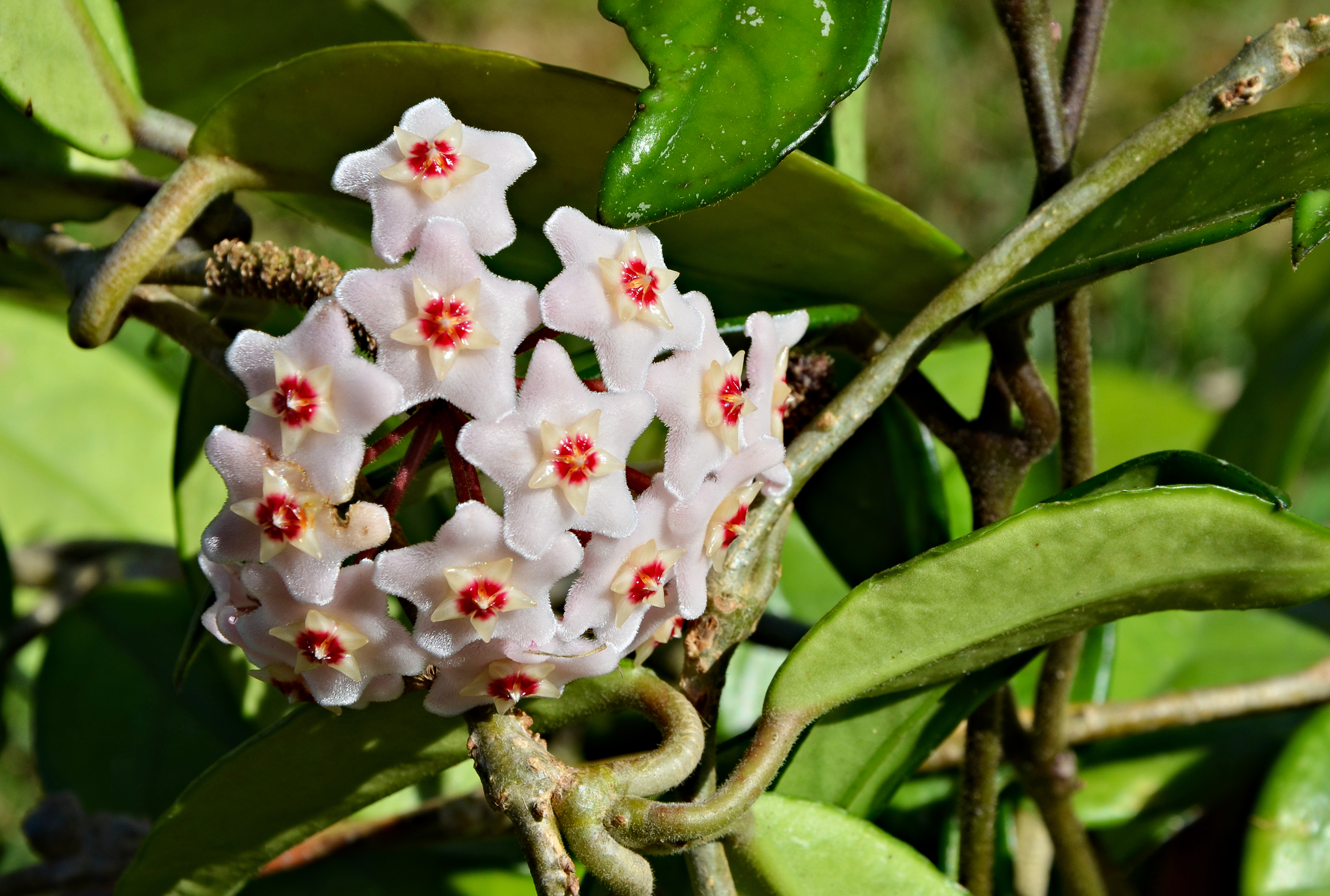
Flower

The inflorescence is made up of numerous flowers, hanging or more upright, which are grouped in an umbel. The flowers are typically light pink, but may vary from near-white to dark pink; they are star-shaped, and are borne in clusters. The thick flower corollas look as if made from porcelaine or from wax, leading to the plant's common names. The surface of the flowers is covered in tiny hairs giving them a fuzzy sheen. They are heavily scented and may produce excess nectar that drips from the flowers. A single flower (corolla) has a diameter of 1.5 to 2 cm.

Like most species of Hoya, H. carnosa flowers grow from specialised perennial peduncles; sometimes these structures are referred to as spurs. These appear from the axils of the leaves and stem; flowers may not be produced when the spurs first appear, but in time buds emerge from their tips. New flowers are produced on these same spurs every year, so they should not be removed.

The plant flowers from spring to late summer, it can produce umbels of 10 to 50 small star-shaped flowers that mature gradually (2 to 3 weeks) on the same peduncle. The scent is nocturnal with a pheromonal tendency.

== Distribution and habitat ==
Hoya carnosa is native to southern China (including Hainan), Taiwan, Laos and Japan (including the Ryukyu Islands).

== Cultivation ==
Hoya carnosa prefers indirect bright light, but will tolerate much less. Though it will tolerate low temperatures (but not freezing), the optimal temperature is 60–85 °F (16–29 °C). It can be propagated by air layering or by stem cuttings. It benefits from an open potting medium that allows some air to get to the roots. Typical mixes include large-grade drainage material such as perlite, pumice, or ceramic balls. The plants should be fed regularly with a fertilizer suitable for epiphytic plants.

There is a persistent piece of belief that hoyas prefer to be pot-bound (kept in a small pot). It is said that this will hasten flowering.

Studies at the University of Georgia, published in 2009, have shown H. carnosa to be an excellent remover of pollutants in the indoor environment.

=== ‘Compacta’ ===
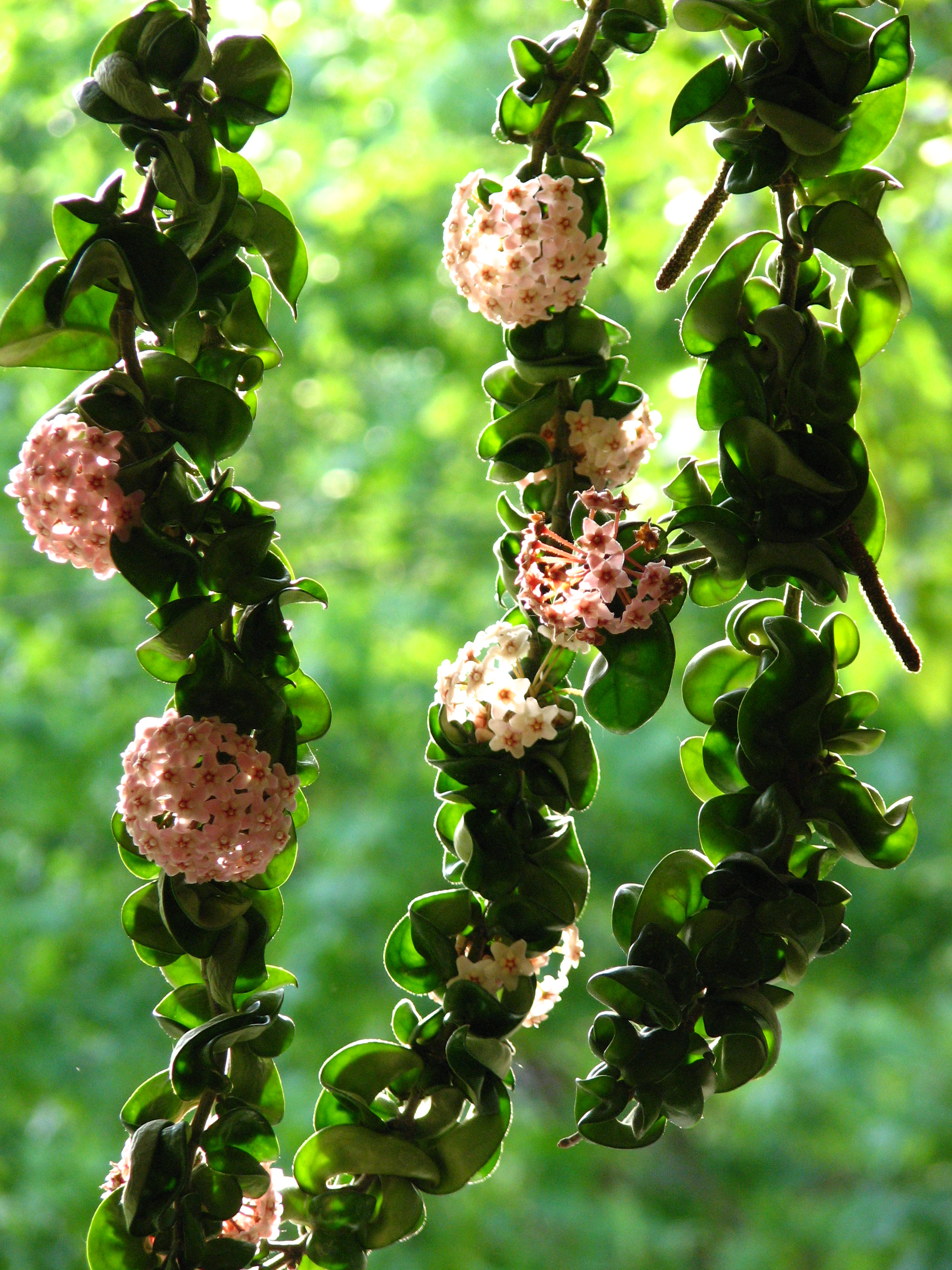
Hoya carnosa ‘Compacta’

The cultivar Hoya carnosa ‘Compacta’, was first discovered as a branch mutation sport at Hummel’s Exotic Gardens of Inglewood, California, and is characterized by its folded, curled leaves and tight internodal spacing, growing in the form of a rope.

It was later popularized in 1967 under the trademark “Hindu Rope” by B. L. Cobia Nursery Inc. of Winter Garden, Florida.

== Gallery ==
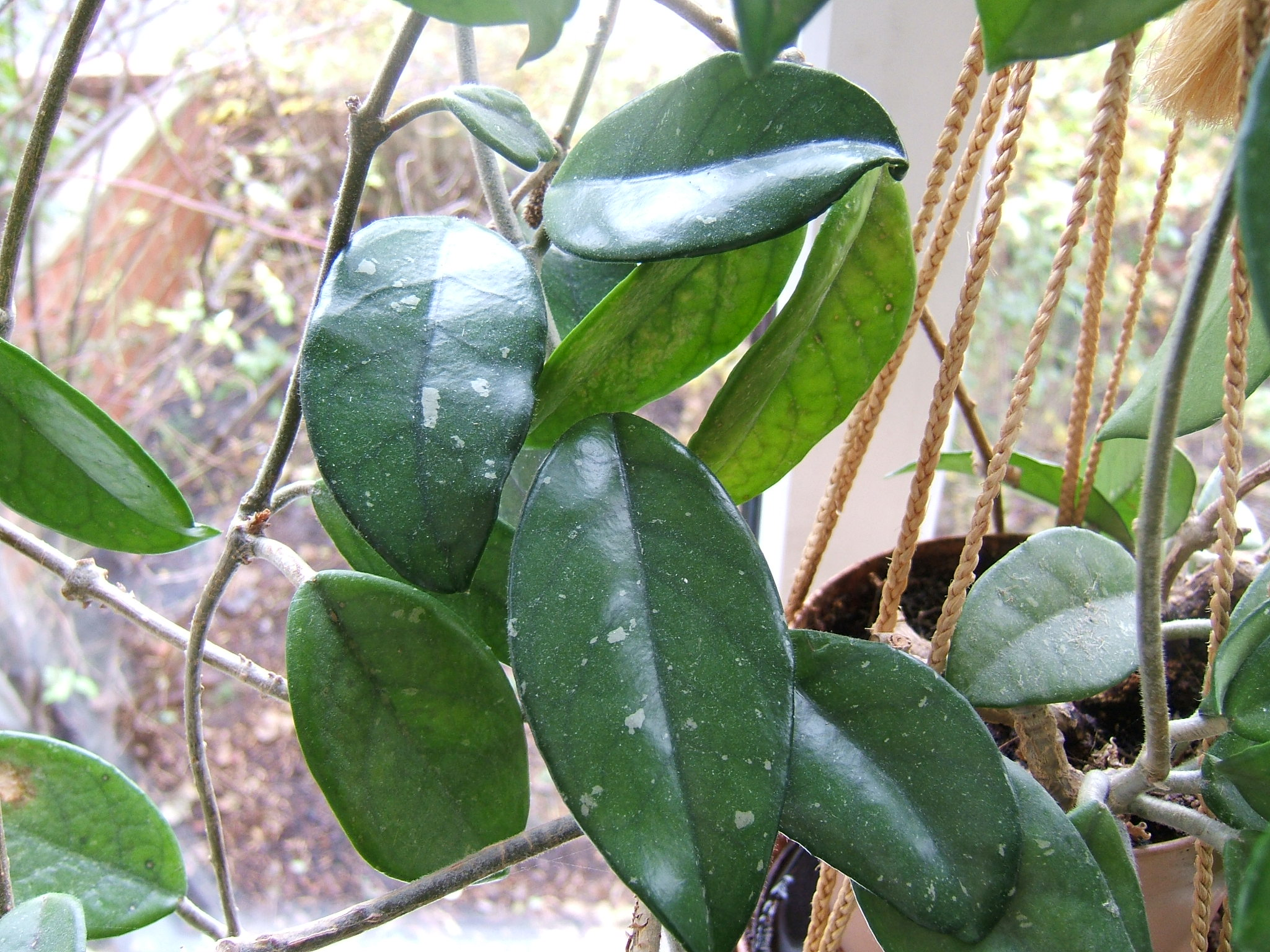
Leaves

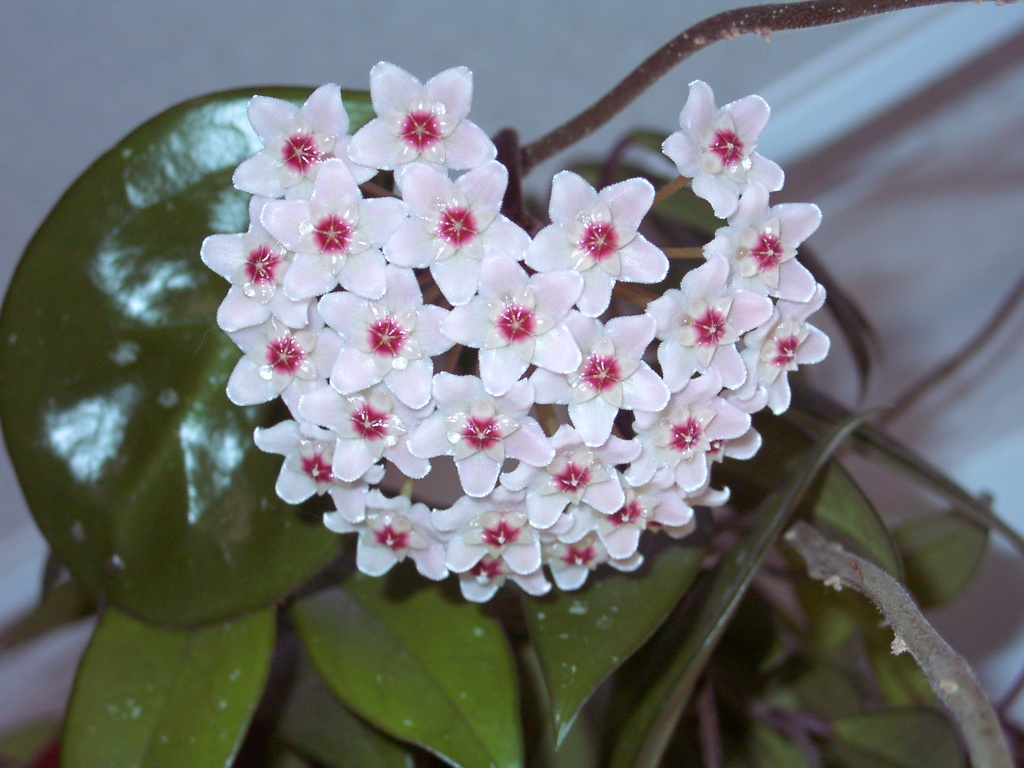
Flower cluster

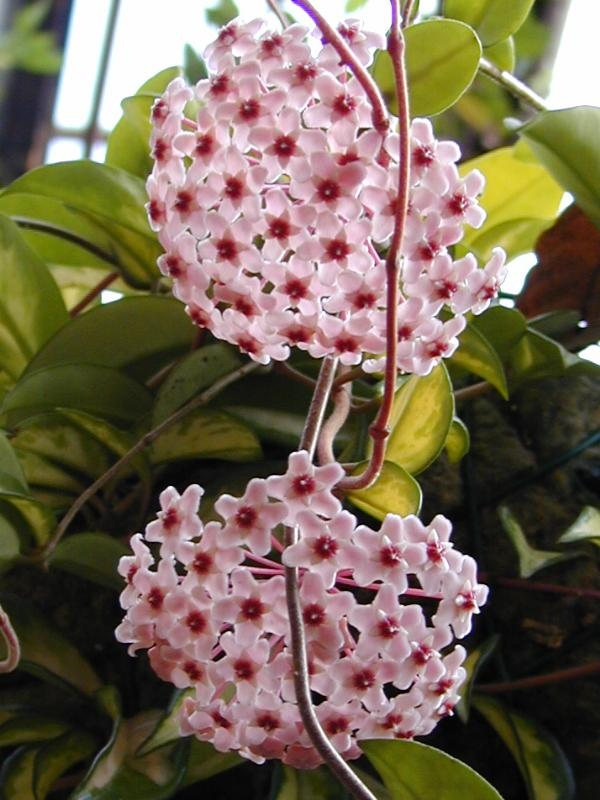
Flower clusters

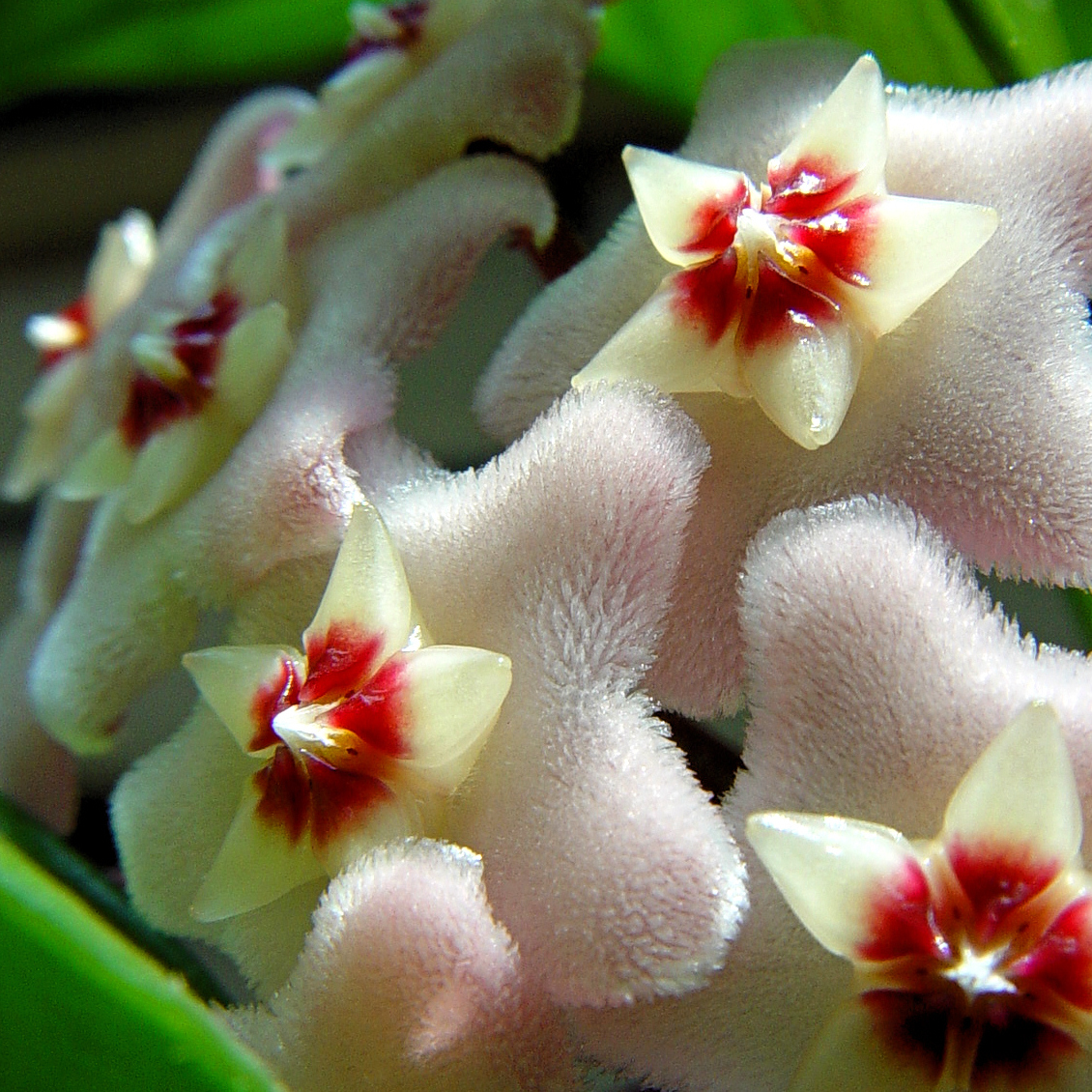
Closeup of flowers

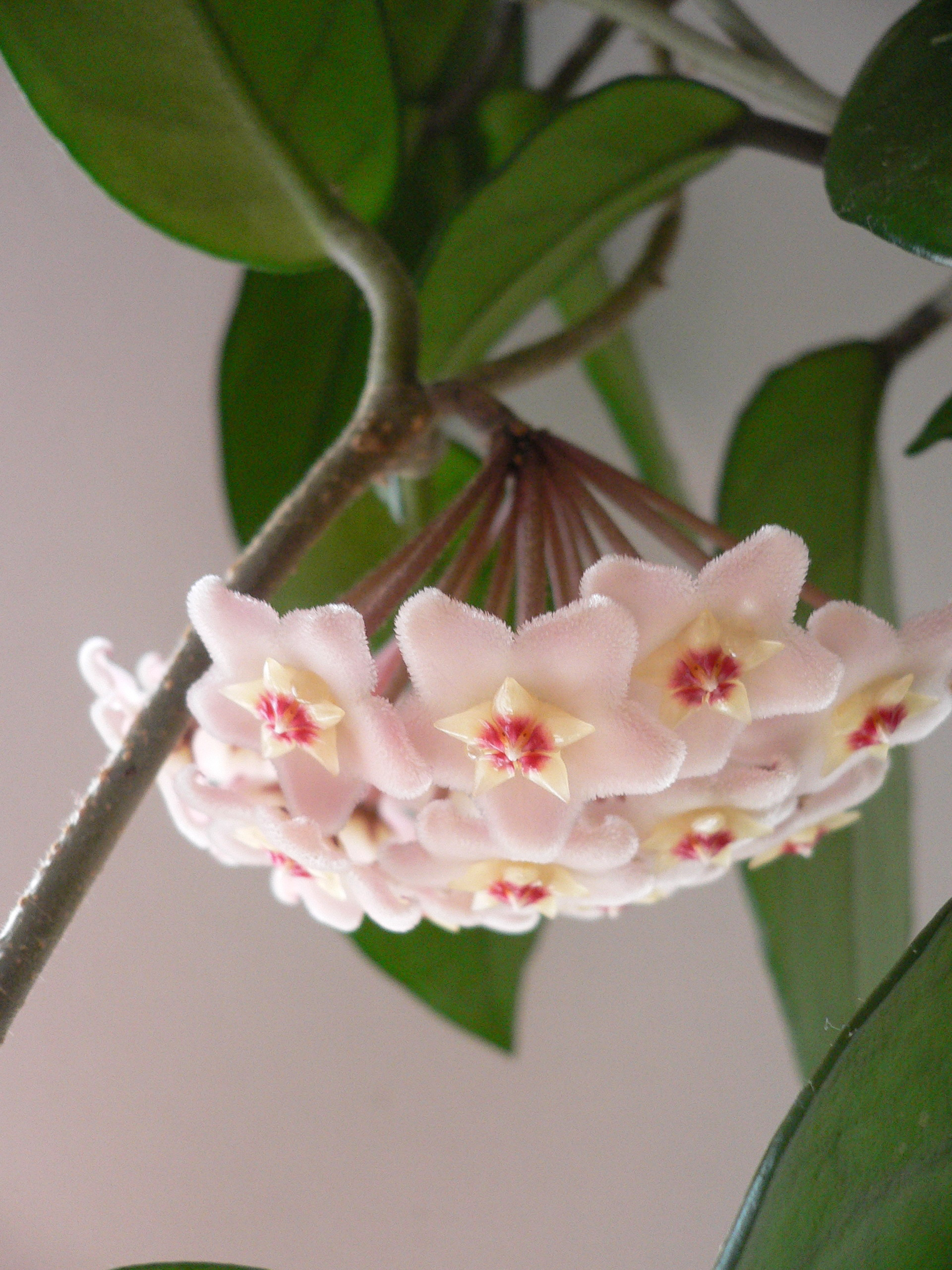
Hanging flowers

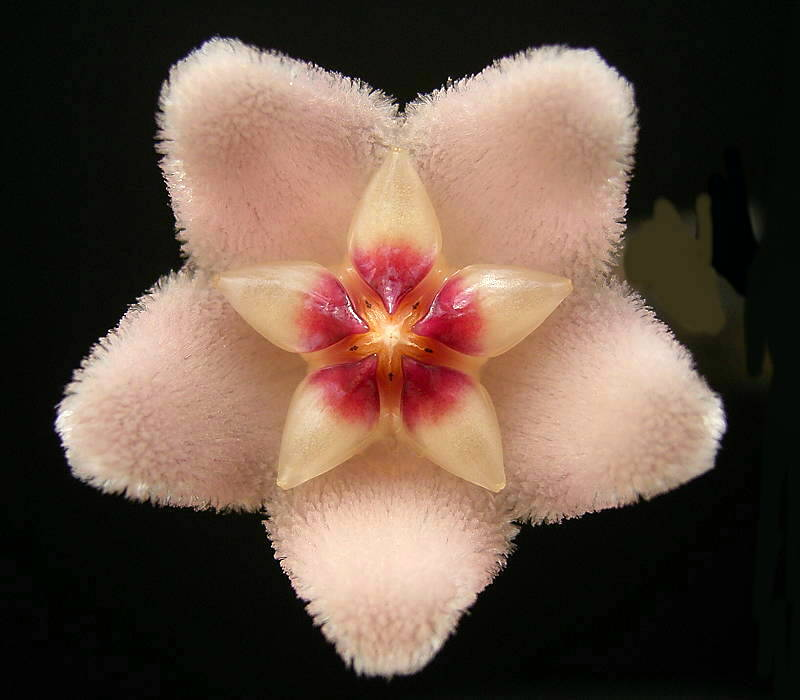
Flower, which looks like a furry starfish

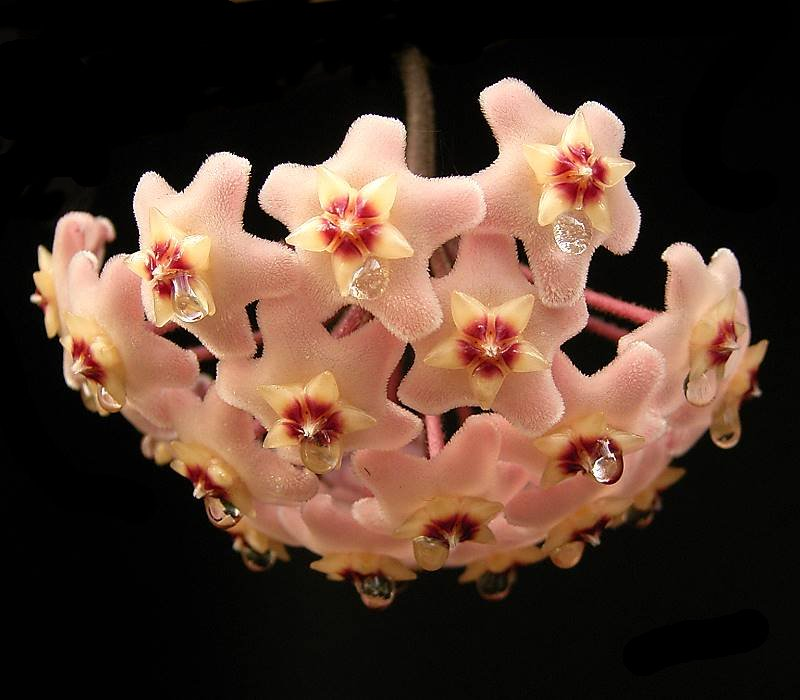
Inflorescence

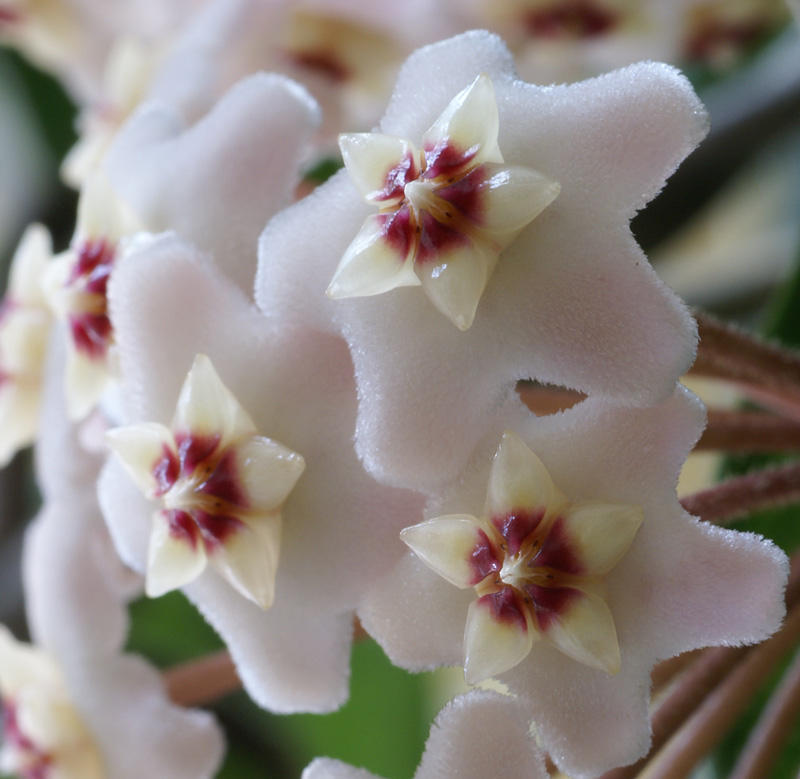
Flower cluster under bright light

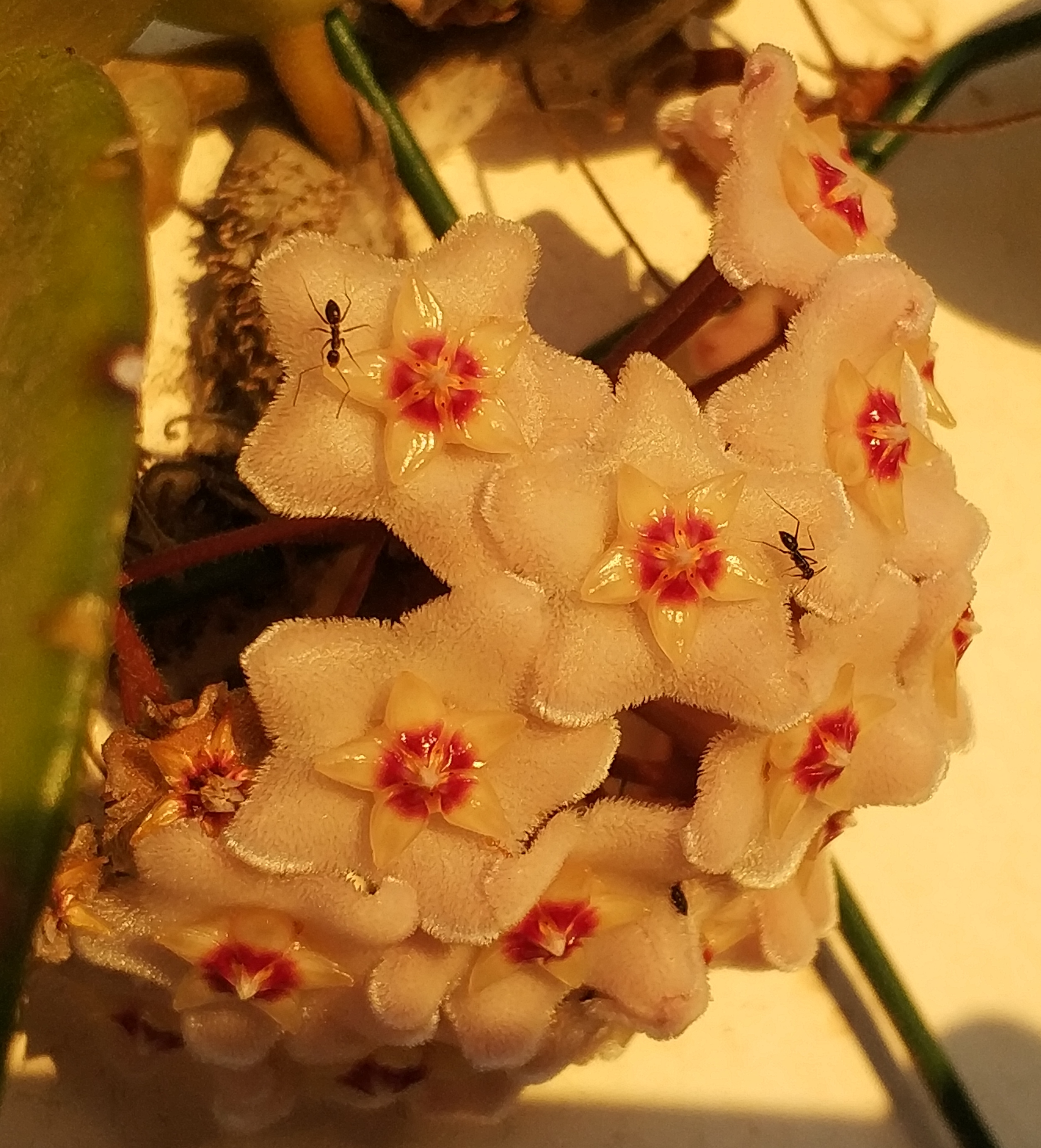
Tapinoma israele drinking nectar of Hoya carnosa

== Bibliography ==
- Hoya carnosa: information in The Plant List
- Trimen, Henry (1888). Hortus Zeylanicus; A Classified List of the Plants, Both Native and Exotic, Growing in the Royal Botanic Gardens. P.R. Deniya. ISBN 9781236067777.
- Phillips, Roger (1997). The Random House Book of Indoor and Greenhouse Plants (Vol. 2). New York, NY, U.S.A.: Random House, Incorporated. ISBN 0375750282.
