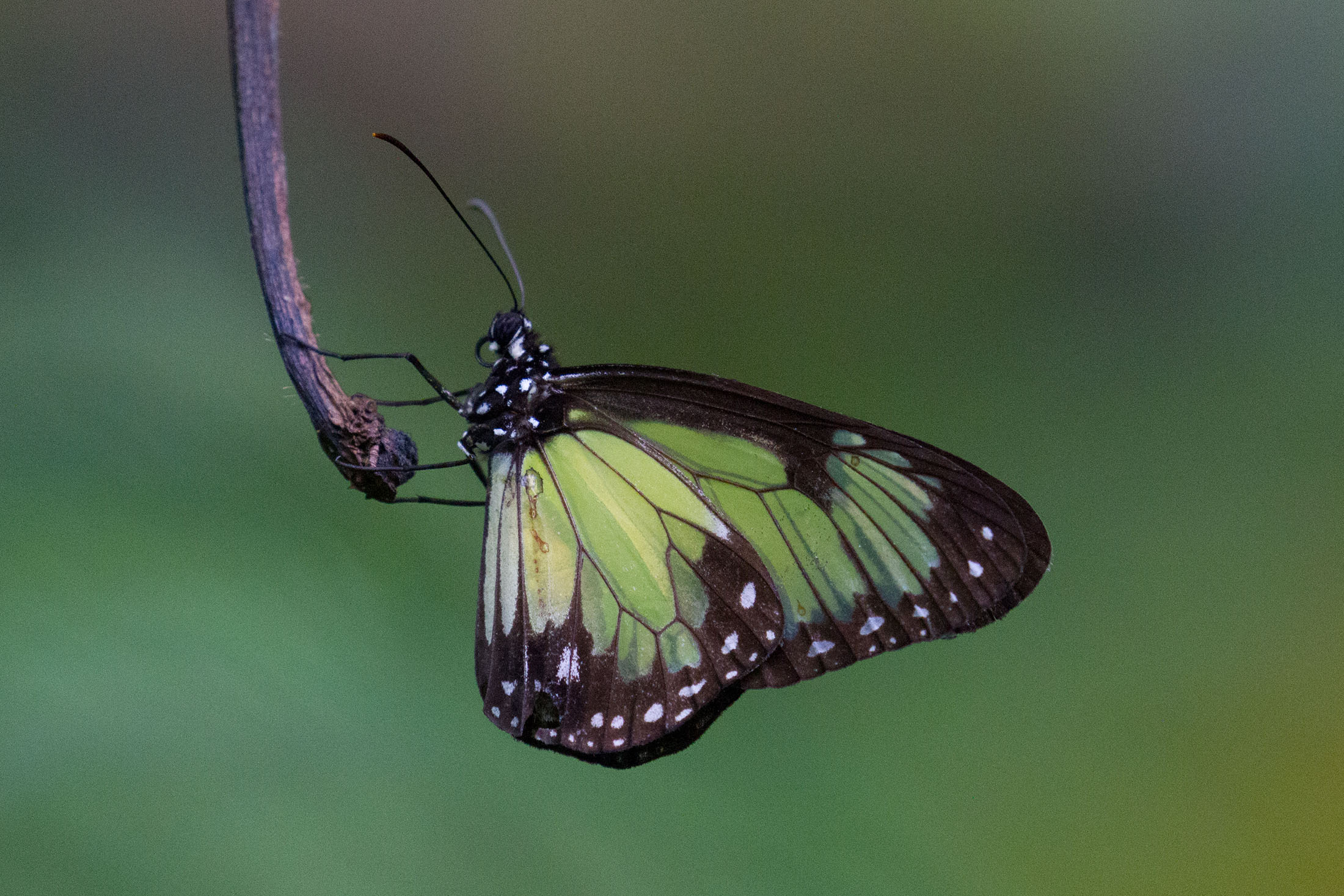
- Parantica schenkii periphas
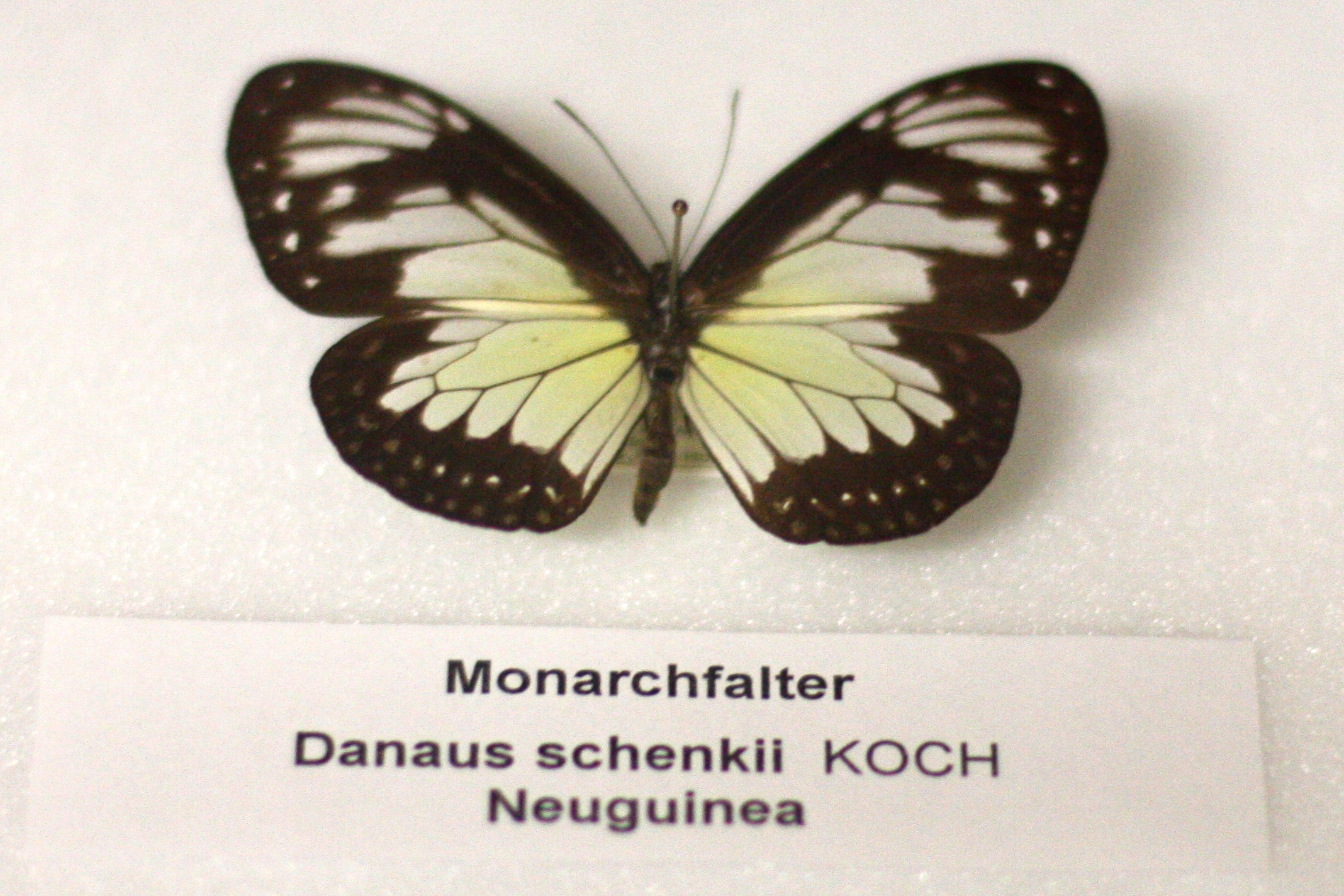
- Pinned specimen labeled as Danais schenkii, a taxonomic synonym

Scientific classification
- Kingdom: Animalia
- Phylum: Arthropoda
- Clade: Pancrustacea
- Class: Insecta
- Order: Lepidoptera
- Family: Nymphalidae
- Genus: Parantica
- Species: P. schenkii

Binomial name
- Parantica schenkii (Koch, 1865)

Subspecies
- See text

Synonyms
- Danais schenkii

= Parantica schenkii =

Species of butterfly

Parantica schenkii is a species of tiger butterfly that belongs to the family of brush-footed butterflies. This species can be found occurring in Southeast Asia including Indonesia, Sulawesi, Malaysia and New Guinea.

== Taxonomy ==
This species contains several subspecies. They are listed below:

- Parantica schenkii citrina
- Parantica schenkii gloriola
- Parantica schenkii omissa
- Parantica schenkii periphas
- Parantica schenkii wallacii
