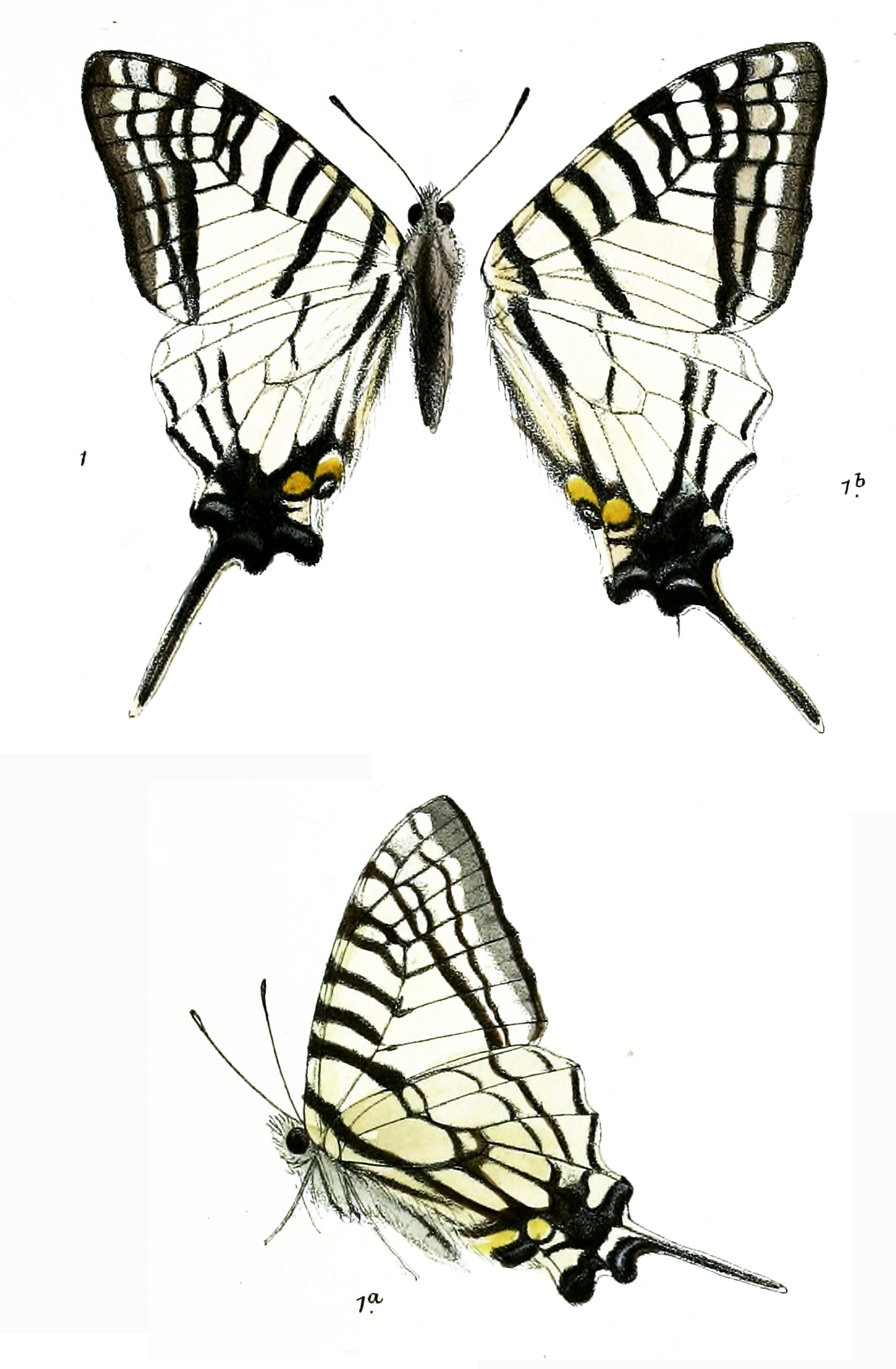

Scientific classification
- Kingdom: Animalia
- Phylum: Arthropoda
- Class: Insecta
- Order: Lepidoptera
- Family: Papilionidae
- Genus: Graphium
- Species: G. glycerion

Binomial name
- Graphium glycerion (Gray, 1831)

Synonyms
- Papilio glycerion Gray, 1831; Pazala glycerion Moore, 1888; Papilio glycerion caschmirensis Rothschild, 1895; Pazala glycerion phangana Okano, 1986

= Graphium glycerion =

Species of butterfly

Graphium glycerion, the spectacle swordtail, is a species of butterfly found in the Indomalayan realm (northern India, China, Thailand, Laos and northern Vietnam). The species was first described by George Robert Gray in 1831.

== Subspecies ==
- G. g glycerion (Nepal, Sikkim, Assam)
- G. g. caschmirensis (Rothschild, 1895) (north-western India)
- G. g. kimurai Murayama, 1982 (northern Thailand)
- G. g. phangana (Okano, 1986) (northern Thailand)

== Taxonomy ==
It may be a synonym of Graphium mandarinus Collins & Morris. It is however treated as a "good species" by Koiwaya. A further problem is that the name glycerion is permanently invalid as a junior primary homonym of Papilio glycerion Borkhausen, 1788.

Graphium glycerion is very little known and as with Graphium mandarinus, G. tamerlanus, G. phidias and G. olbrechtsi few specimens exist.
