= Graphium euphratoides =

Scientific classification
- Kingdom: Animalia
- Phylum: Arthropoda
- Clade: Pancrustacea
- Class: Insecta
- Order: Lepidoptera
- Family: Papilionidae
- Genus: Graphium
- Species: G. euphratoides

Binomial name
- Graphium euphratoides (Eimer, 1889)

Synonyms
- Papilio euphratoides Eimer, 1889

Species of butterfly

Graphium euphratoides is a butterfly found in Mindanao in the Philippines that belongs to the swallowtail family.

== Taxonomy ==
Originally described as Papilio antiphates Cram. Form euphratoides Eimer, 1889 this taxon has been treated as

- a synonym (aberration) of Graphium antiphates decolor Staudinger, 1888
- a subspecies of Graphium euphrates Felder, 1862
- a subspecies of Graphium decolor Staudinger, 1888
- a species of Graphium
