= Pale green triangle =

Pale green triangle may refer to:

- Graphium eurypylus, a swallowtail butterfly commonly known as the great jay or pale green triangle
- Graphium evemon, a sister species commonly known as the lesser jay but sometimes also referred to as the pale green triangle
