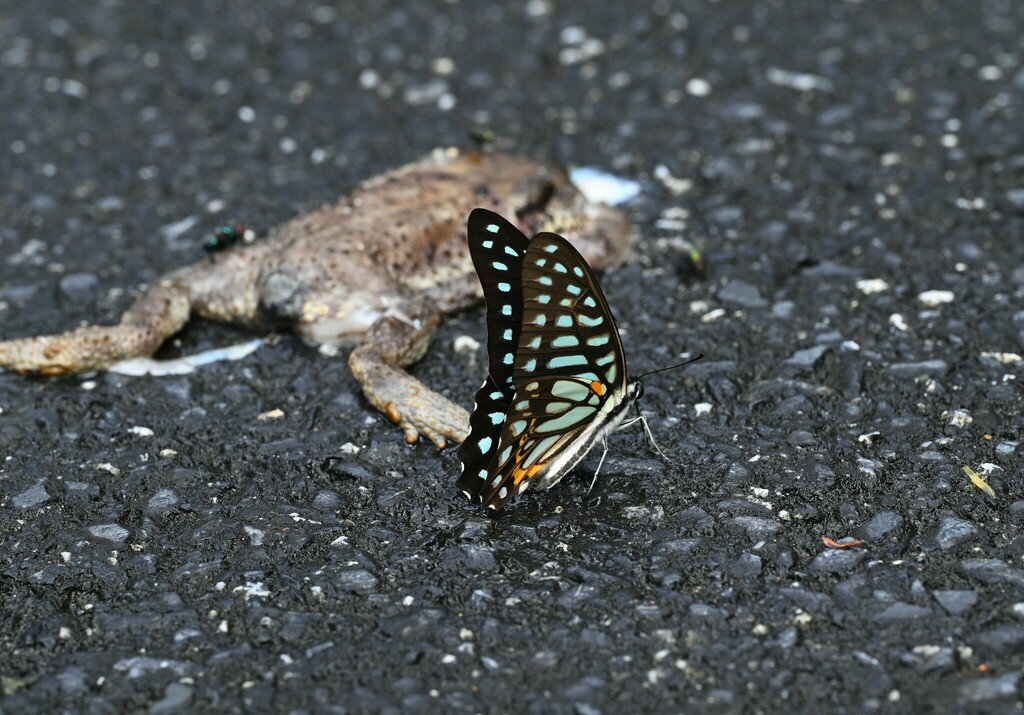

Scientific classification
- Kingdom: Animalia
- Phylum: Arthropoda
- Clade: Pancrustacea
- Class: Insecta
- Order: Lepidoptera
- Family: Papilionidae
- Genus: Graphium
- Species: G. leechi

Binomial name
- Graphium leechi (Rothschild, 1895)

Synonyms
- Papilio leechi Rothschild, 1895

= Graphium leechi =

Species of butterfly

Graphium leechi is a species of butterfly from the family Papilionidae that is found in China and Vietnam. Very little is known about this species. It is distinguished from Graphium bathycles chiefly by the strongly developed woolly scent-organ in the fold of the hindwing.

== Subspecies ==
- G. l. leechi
- G. l. yunnana C.L. Lee, 1985
- G. l. aprilis (gen. vernalis) Bang-Haas, 1934
