= Graphium incerta =

Scientific classification
- Kingdom: Animalia
- Phylum: Arthropoda
- Clade: Pancrustacea
- Class: Insecta
- Order: Lepidoptera
- Family: Papilionidae
- Genus: Graphium
- Species: G. incerta

Binomial name
- Graphium incerta Bang-Haas, 1927

Species of butterfly

Graphium incerta is a butterfly found in China that belongs to the swallowtail family.

== Taxonomy ==
Originally described as a subspecies of Graphium tamerlana and later treated as conspecific with G. tamerlana. Studies of the genitalia by Chou and Koiwaya suggested it is a full species.
