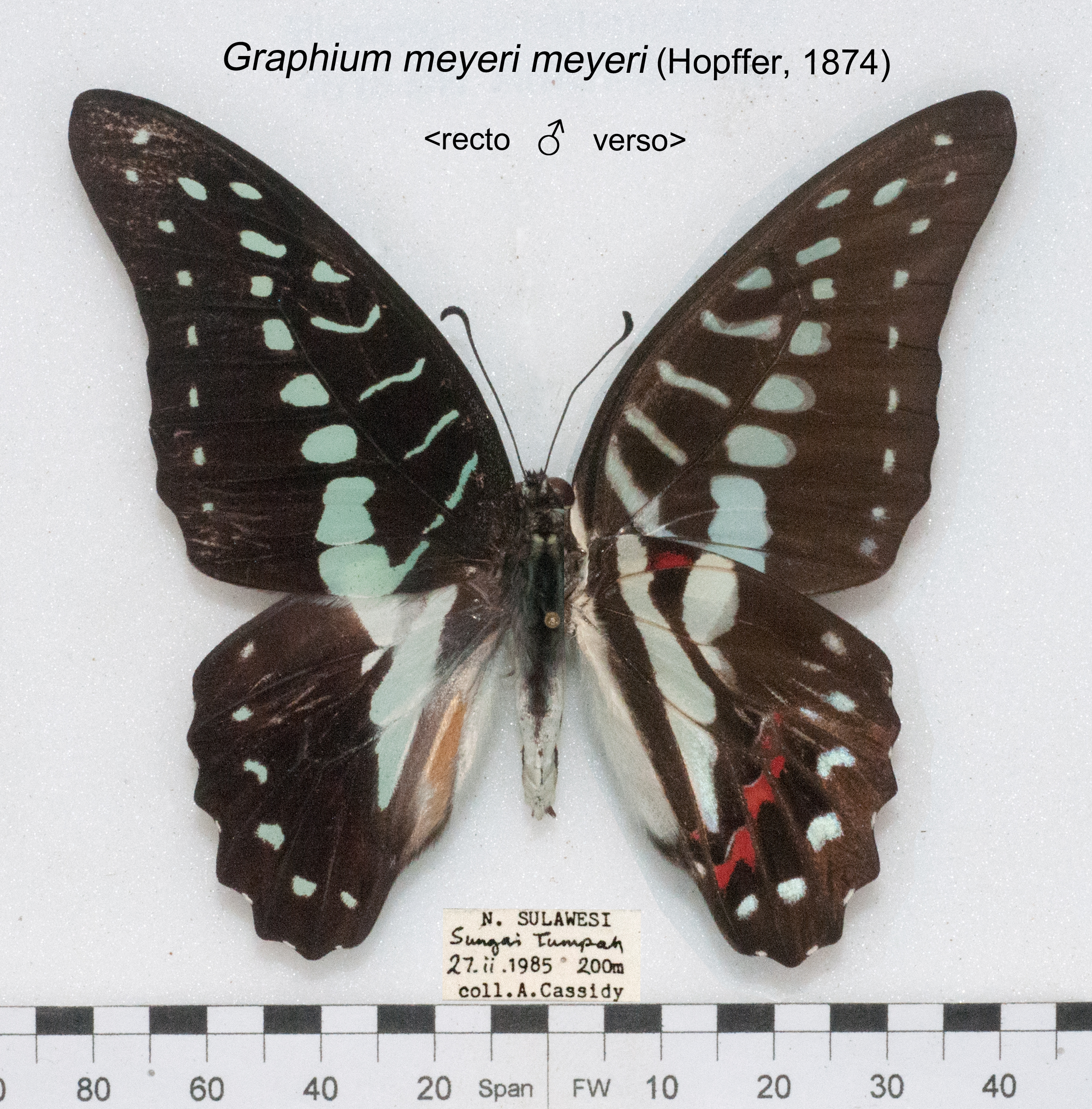

Conservation status
- Least Concern (IUCN 3.1)

Scientific classification
- Kingdom: Animalia
- Phylum: Arthropoda
- Clade: Pancrustacea
- Class: Insecta
- Order: Lepidoptera
- Family: Papilionidae
- Genus: Graphium
- Species: G. meyeri

Binomial name
- Graphium meyeri (Hopffer, 1874)

Synonyms
- Papilio meyeri Hopffer, 1874

= Graphium meyeri =

Species of butterfly

Graphium meyeri is a species of butterfly of the family Papilionidae, that is found in Sulawesi. Very little is known about this species.

== Subspecies ==
- G. m. meyeri (northern Sulawesi)
- G. m. extremum Tsukada & Nishiyama, 1980 (Sula Island)
