= Graphium stratocles =

Scientific classification
- Kingdom: Animalia
- Phylum: Arthropoda
- Clade: Pancrustacea
- Class: Insecta
- Order: Lepidoptera
- Family: Papilionidae
- Genus: Graphium
- Species: G. stratocles

Binomial name
- Graphium stratocles (C. & R. Felder, 1861)

Synonyms
- Papilio stratocles C. & R. Felder, 1861; Paranticopsis stratocles stratocles; Papilio stratocles stratonices Jordan, 1909; Arisbe stratocles dodongi Page & Treadaway, 2003; Arisbe stratocles pingi Page & Treadaway, 2003

Species of butterfly

Graphium stratocles is a species of butterfly in the family Papilionidae. It is found in the Philippines.

== Subspecies ==
- G. s. stratocles (Philippines: Mindoro)
- G. s. stratonices (Jordan, 1909) (Philippines: Bohol, Dinagat, Leyte, Mindanao, Panaon, Samar)
- G. s. senectus Tsukada & Nishiyama, 1980 (Philippines: Luzon, Marinduque)
- G. s. dodongi (Page & Treadaway, 2003) (Philippines: Palawan)
- G. s. pingi (Page & Treadaway, 2003) (Philippines: Busuanga)

== Status ==
Common. Not threatened.
