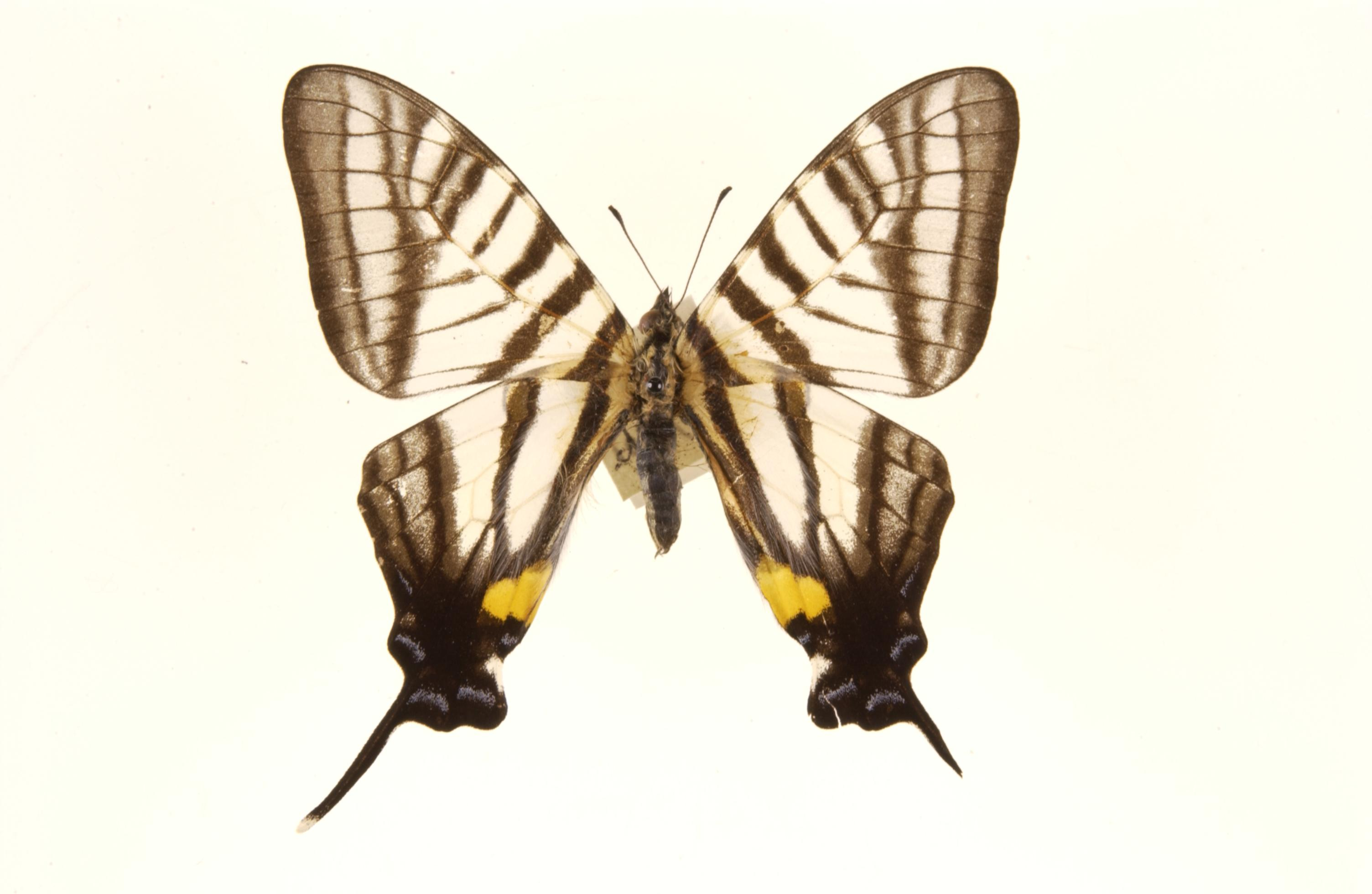

Scientific classification
- Kingdom: Animalia
- Phylum: Arthropoda
- Class: Insecta
- Order: Lepidoptera
- Family: Papilionidae
- Genus: Graphium
- Species: G. mullah

Binomial name
- Graphium mullah (Alphéraky, 1897)

Synonyms
- Papilio mullah Alphéraky, 1897

= Graphium mullah =

Species of butterfly

Graphium mullah is a species of butterfly in the family Papilionidae. It is found in China, Laos, Vietnam, Japan and Taiwan.

== Subspecies ==
- G. m. mullah (Alphéraky 1897) (China, Taiwan and Japan)
- G. m. kooichii Morita, 1996 (Laos)
- G. m.timur Ney, 1911 ("Ta-tsien-lu", China)
