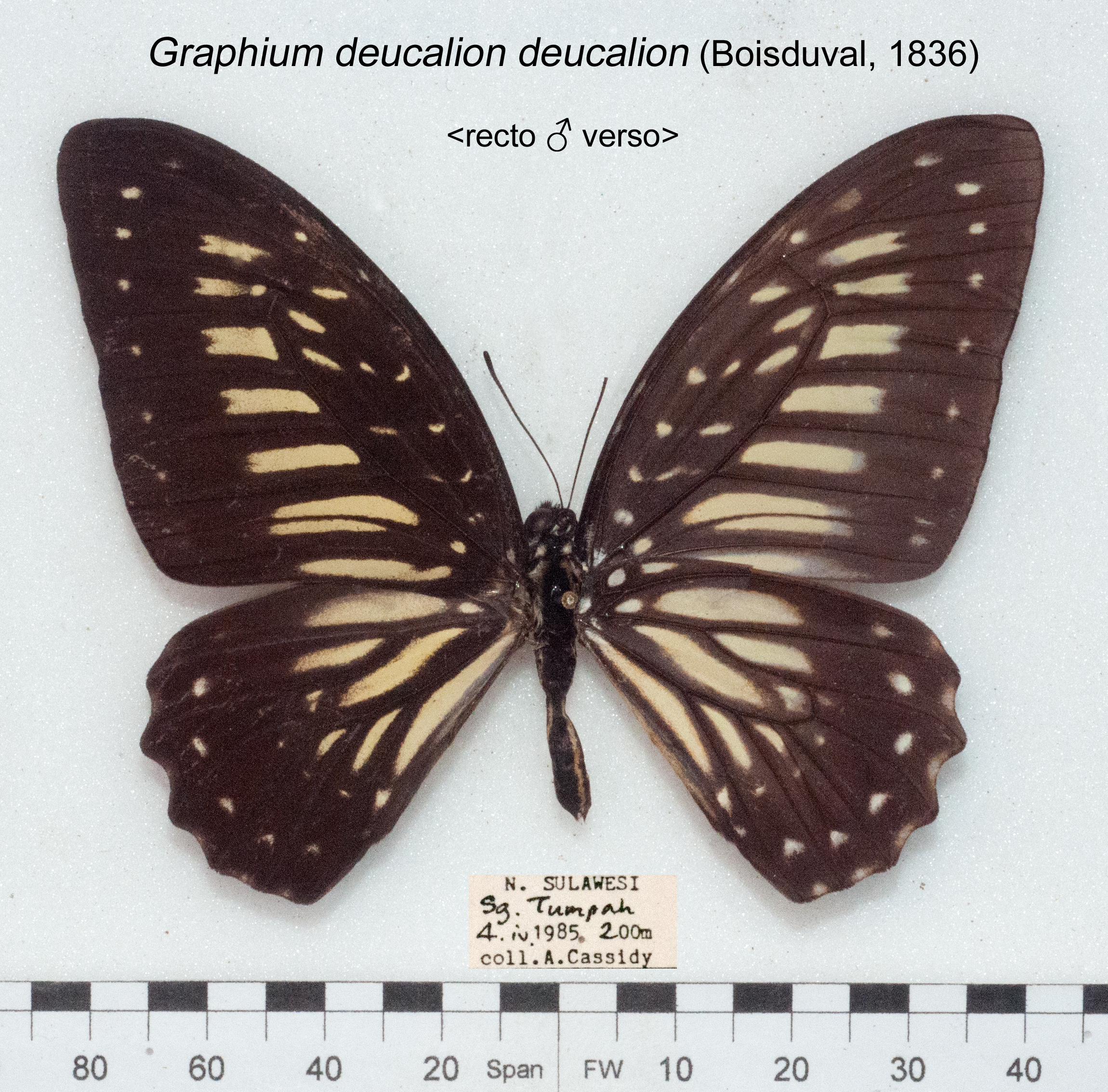
- Male from North Sulawesi, Indonesia

Conservation status
- Least Concern (IUCN 3.1)

Scientific classification
- Kingdom: Animalia
- Phylum: Arthropoda
- Clade: Pancrustacea
- Class: Insecta
- Order: Lepidoptera
- Family: Papilionidae
- Genus: Graphium
- Species: G. deucalion

Binomial name
- Graphium deucalion (Boisduval, 1836)

Synonyms
- Papilio deucalion Boisduval, 1836; Papilio leucadion Staudinger, 1884

= Graphium deucalion =

Species of butterfly

Graphium deucalion, the yellow zebra, is a butterfly found in the Sunda Islands and the Moluccas that belongs to the swallowtail family. It is not known to be threatened.

== Subspecies ==
- G. d. deucalion (Boisduval, 1836)(Sulawesi)
- G. d. leucadion (Staudinger, 1884) (Ternate, Halmahera, Bachan)
- G. d. marabuntana Detani, 1983 (Banggai)
