= Graphium procles =

Conservation status
- Vulnerable (IUCN 2.3)

Scientific classification
- Kingdom: Animalia
- Phylum: Arthropoda
- Clade: Pancrustacea
- Class: Insecta
- Order: Lepidoptera
- Family: Papilionidae
- Genus: Graphium
- Species: G. procles

Binomial name
- Graphium procles Grose-Smith, 1887

Species of butterfly

Graphium procles is a species of butterfly of the family Papilionidae. It is endemic to the Crocker Range in the Malaysian part of Borneo, including Mount Kinabalu. It occurs in lower montane forests above 1,000 metres (3,300 ft).
