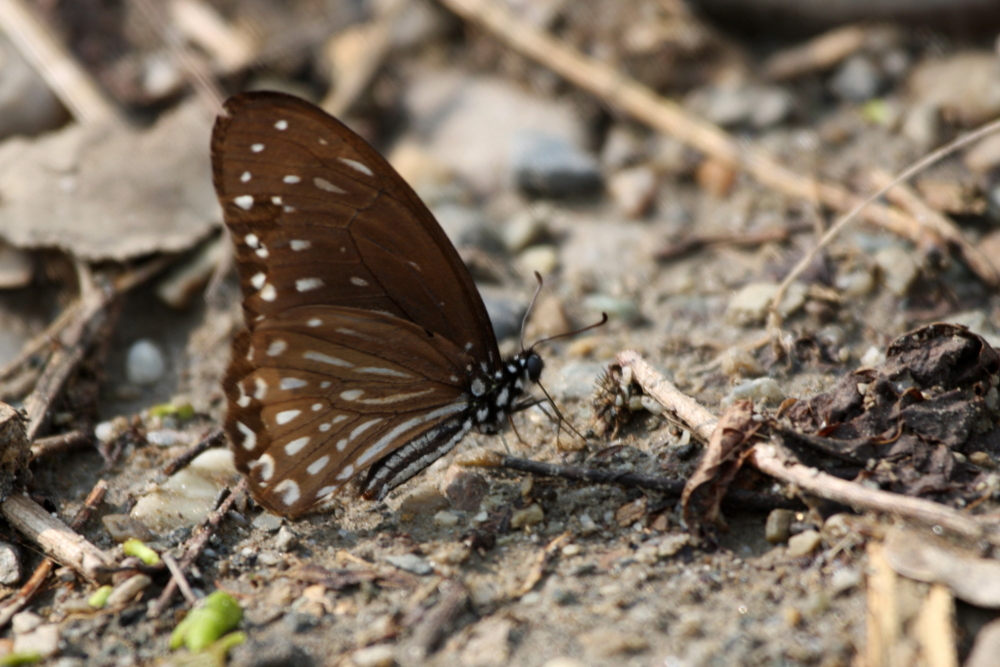

Scientific classification
- Kingdom: Animalia
- Phylum: Arthropoda
- Clade: Pancrustacea
- Class: Insecta
- Order: Lepidoptera
- Family: Papilionidae
- Genus: Graphium
- Species: G. megarus

Binomial name
- Graphium megarus Westwood, 1841

Synonyms
- Pathysa megarus; Papilio megarus; Paranticopsis megarus

= Graphium megarus =

Spotted zebra

Species of butterfly

Graphium megarus, the spotted zebra, is a species of swallowtail butterfly found in Southeast Asia. It is common and not considered to be threatened; however, the nominate subspecies is protected by law in India.

== Description ==
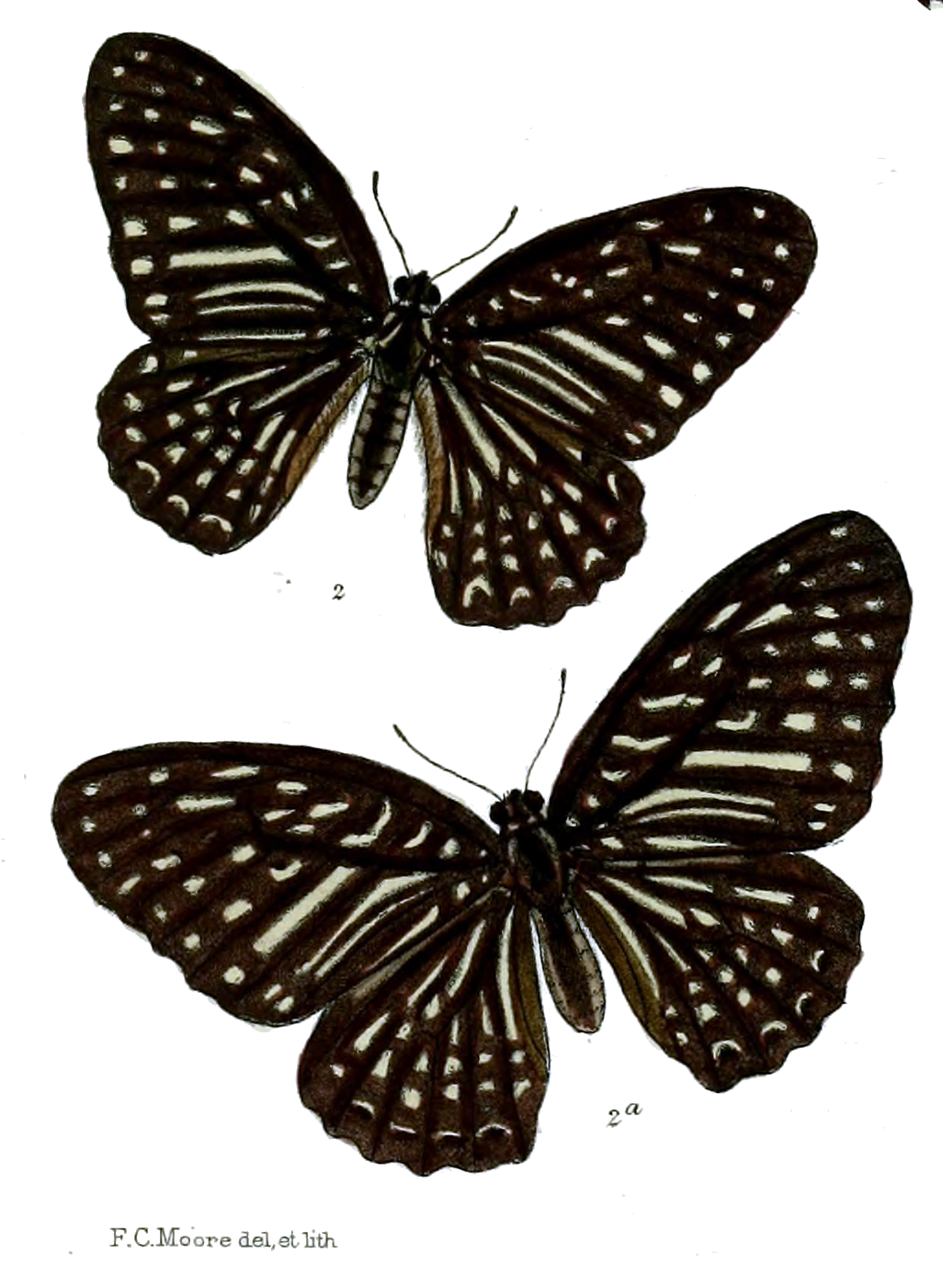

Male upperside black with the following white streaks and spots. Forewing cell with a small spot at base followed by three obliquely transverse streaks in middle, none extended to either the subcostal or median veins, and two spots near apex; single slender narrow streaks in interspaces la and 2, and two streaks in interspace 1; above these a spot at base followed by a streak in each of the interspaces 3, 4, 6 and 8, an outer spot only in interspace 5, and a basal spot in interspace 7; finally, a complete series of small subterminal spots. Hindwing: a streak in cell with a spot above its outer apex; a streak followed by a spot in each of the interspaces 1, 6 and 7; three elongate spots in interspaces 2 and 3 and two in interspaces 4 and 5; finally, a series of four slender subterminal lunules in interspaces 2 to 5. Underside similar, with similar but slightly broader markings. Female similar, ground colour duller, more fuliginous black; markings similar, on the forewing slightly broader, on the hindwing slightly narrower, than in the male. Karl Jordan in Seitz (pages 105) provides a description differentiating megarus from nearby taxa and discussing some forms.

== Subspecies ==
- G. m. fleximacula (Rothschild, 1895) – Malaysia (Sabah: Banguey Island)
- G. m. marthae (Toxopeus, 1938) – Indonesia (Java)
- G. m. megarus (Westwood, 1844) – India (Assam), Myanmar, Thailand, Laos, Cambodia, Vietnam, China (Yunnan, Hainan), Malaysia (Peninsular Malaya), Indonesia (Sumatra)
- G. m. megapenthes (Fruhstorfer, 1902) – Malaysia (Peninsular Malaya, Langkawi Island), Indonesia (Sumatra)
- G. m. sagittiger (Fruhstorfer, 1901) – Indonesia (Borneo)
- G. m. tiomanensis (Eliot, 1978) – Malaysia (Pulau Tioman)

== See also ==
- Papilionidae
- List of butterflies of India
- List of butterflies of India (Papilionidae)
