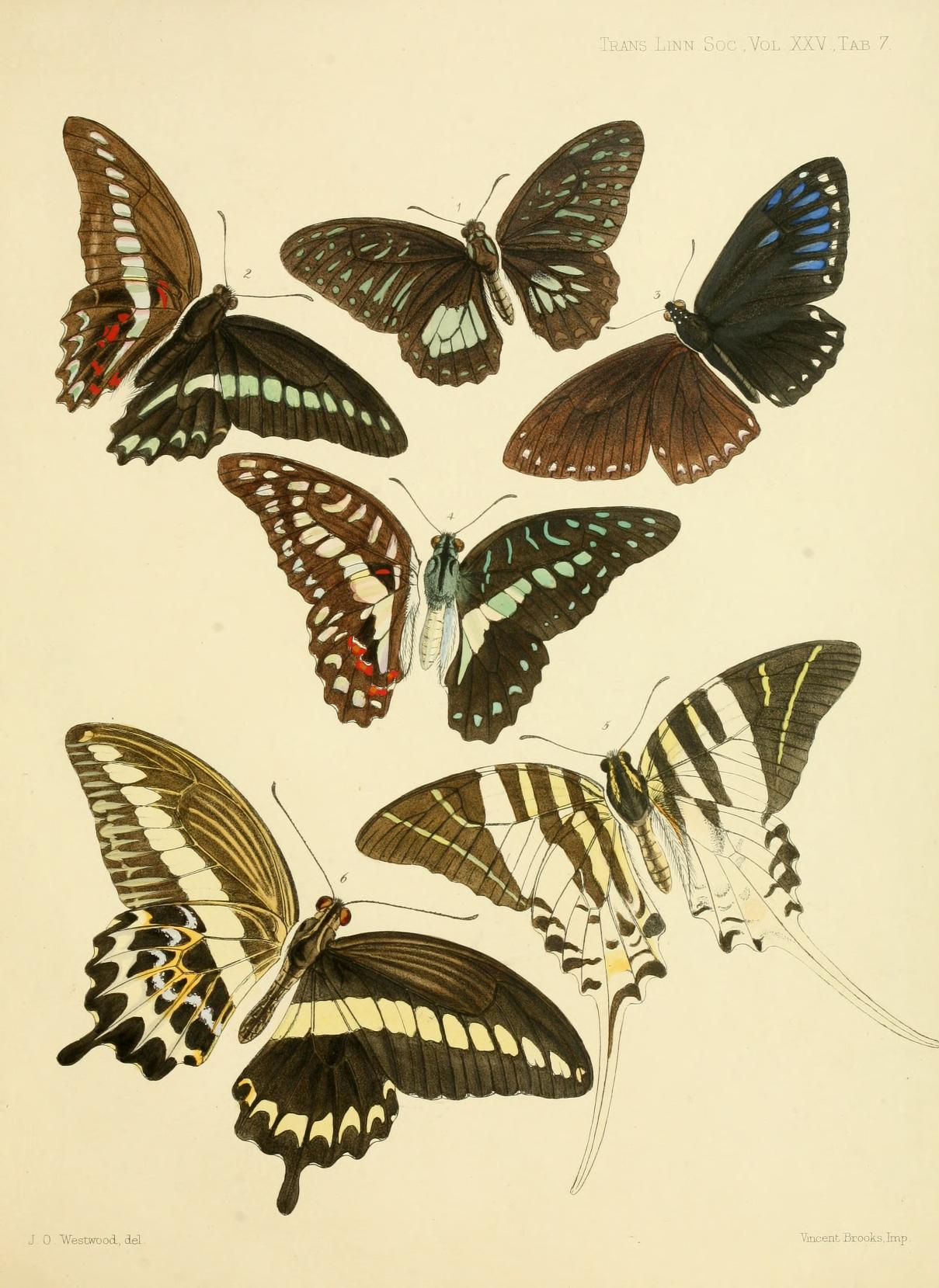
- Wallace's figure (1) of Graphium thule

Scientific classification
- Kingdom: Animalia
- Phylum: Arthropoda
- Clade: Pancrustacea
- Class: Insecta
- Order: Lepidoptera
- Family: Papilionidae
- Genus: Graphium
- Species: G. thule

Binomial name
- Graphium thule (Wallace, 1865)

Synonyms
- Papilio thule Wallace, 1865; Papilio thule leuthe Grose-Smith, 1894; Papilio goldiei Godman & Salvin, 1880; Papilio felixi Joicey & Noakes, 1915; Graphium felixi Joicey & Noakes, 1915

= Graphium thule =

Species of butterfly

Graphium thule is a species of butterfly in the family Papilionidae. It is found in New Guinea. The larva feeds on Aquifoliacene ilex.

Graphium thule is not common but not known to be threatened. It mimics the danaines Ideopsis juventa and Tirumala hamata. There is one subspecies felixi Joicey & Noakes, 1915 and three forms. It is an endemic species.

== See also ==
- Fauna of New Guinea
