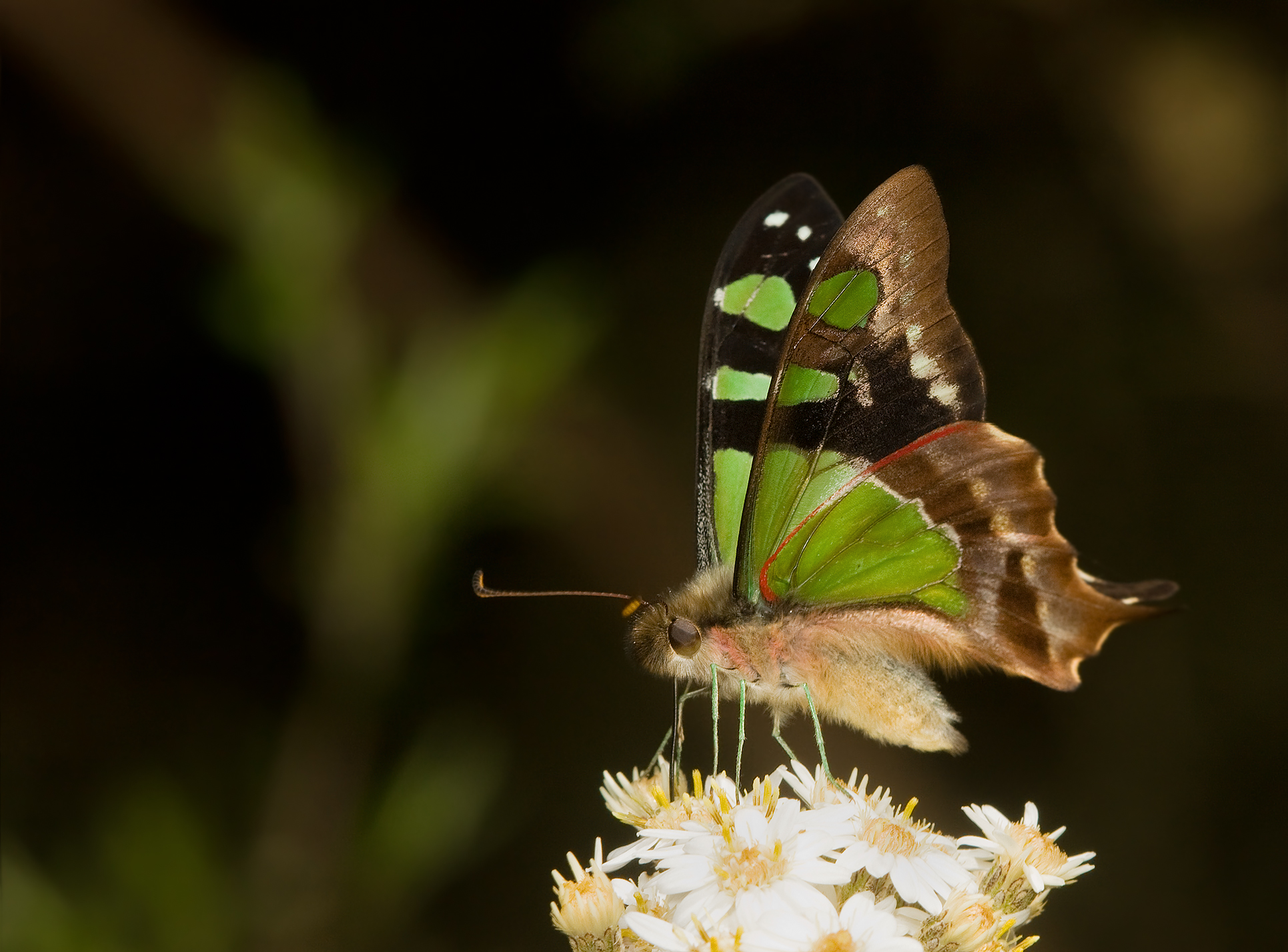
- Macleay's swallowtail (Graphium macleayanus)

Scientific classification
- Kingdom: Animalia
- Phylum: Arthropoda
- Clade: Pancrustacea
- Class: Insecta
- Order: Lepidoptera
- Family: Papilionidae
- Subfamily: Papilioninae
- Tribe: Leptocircini
- Genus: Graphium; Scopoli, 1777

Species
- More than 100; see text

Synonyms
- Zelima Fabricius, 1807; Arisbe Hübner, [1819]; Idaides Hübner, [1819]; Zetides Hübner, [1819]; Ailus Billberg, 1820; Chlorisses Swainson, [1832]; Semicudati Koch, 1860; Pathysa Reakirt, [1865]; Dalchina Moore, [1881]; Paranticopsis Wood-Mason & de Nicéville, 1887; Pazala Moore, 1888; Deoris Moore, [1903]; Klinzigia Niculescu, 1977 (nec Lehrer, 1970); Klinzigiana Niculescu, 1989; Eurypyleana Niculescu, 1989; Macfarlaneana Niculescu, 1989; Munroana Niculescu, 1989; Wallaceana Niculescu, 1989

= Graphium (butterfly) =

Genus of swallowtail butterflies

Graphium is a genus of mostly tropical swallowtail butterflies commonly known as swordtails or ladies. Native to Eurasia, Africa, and Oceania, the genus is represented by over 100 species. Their colouration is as variable as the habitats they frequent; from rainforest to savannah. Some possess tails which may be long and swordlike, while others lack any hindwing extensions. Graphium species are often sighted at mud puddles.

The more colourful species are popular with collectors and are commonly seen mounted in frames for sale. Well-known species include the tailed jay (Graphium agamemnon), common bluebottle (G. sarpedon), and the purple-spotted swallowtail (G. weiskei). One species, G. idaeoides, is notable for being a perfect mimic of the danainid Idea leuconoe.

Larvae feed variously on Annonaceae (most commonly), Magnoliaceae (commonly), Lauraceae (commonly), Rutaceae, Dioscoreaceae, Bombacaceae, Piperaceae, Anacardiaceae, Apocynaceae, Malpighiaceae, Hernandiaceae, Guttiferae, Monimiaceae, Pandanaceae, Winteraceae, and Euphorbiaceae.

Note that there is a genus of fungi also called Graphium.

== Species ==
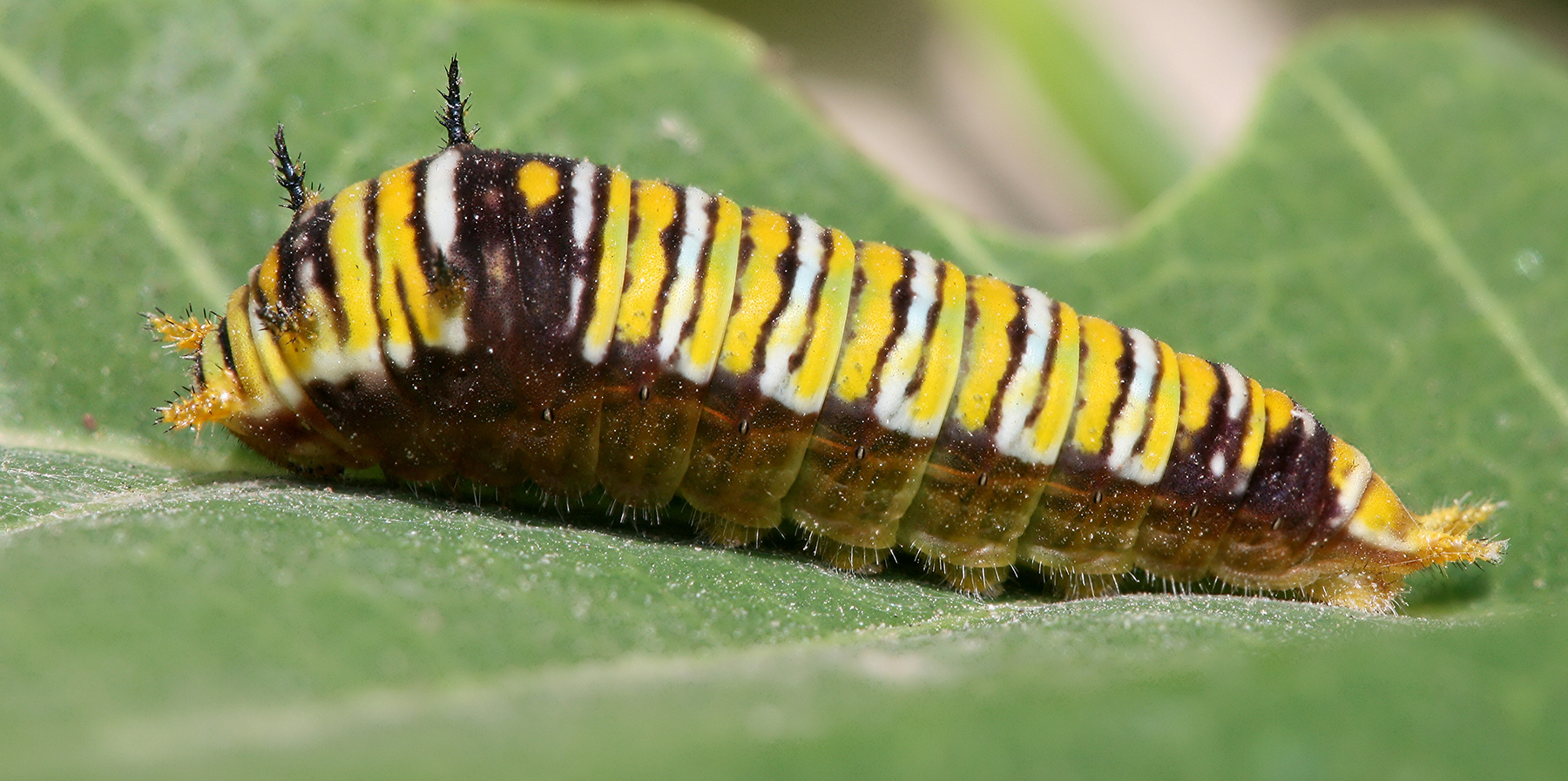
Graphium caterpillar

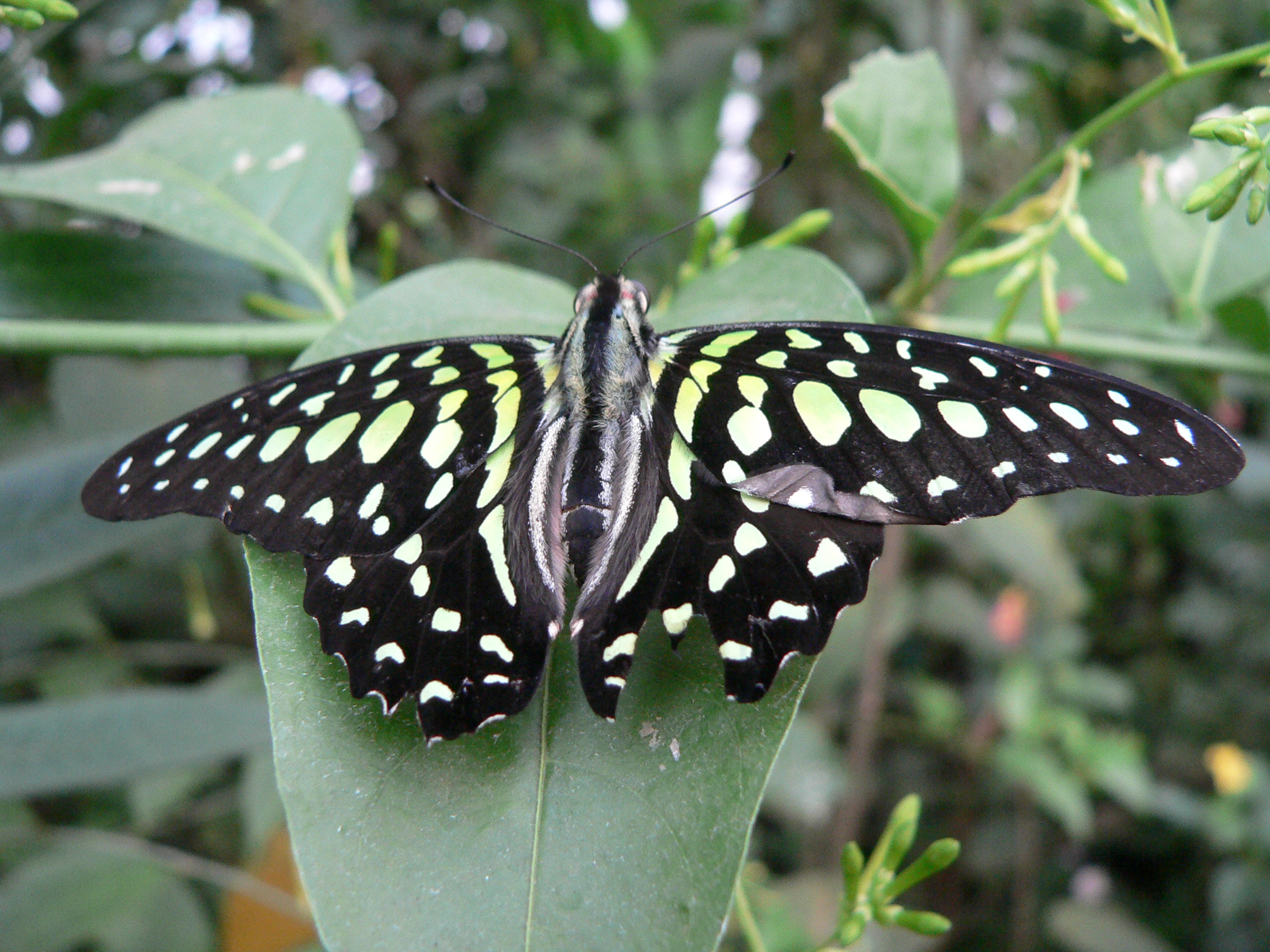
Graphium agamemnon

Listed alphabetically:

subgenus: Graphium Scopoli, 1777

species group: codrus

- Graphium anthedon (C. & R. Felder, 1864) – Wallacea bluebottle
- Graphium choredon (C. & R. Felder, 1864) – blue triangle
- Graphium cloanthus (Westwood, 1841) – glassy bluebottle
- Graphium codrus (Cramer, [1777]) – eastern olive triangle
- Graphium empedocles (Fabricius, 1787), originally Papilio empedocles Fabricius, 1787; Mantissa Insectorum 2: 10, no. 94 = homonym of Papilio empedocles Cramer, 1779; replaced by empedovana Corbet, 1941.
- Graphium empedovana (Corbet, 1941)
- Graphium gelon (Boisduval, 1859)
- Graphium isander (Godman & Salvin, 1888)
- Graphium jugans (Rothschild, 1896)
- Graphium kosii Müller & Tennent, 1999
- Graphium macleayanus (Leach, 1814) – Macleay's swallowtail
- Graphium mendana (Godman & Salvin, 1888)
- Graphium milon (C. & R. Felder, 1865)
- Graphium monticolus (Fruhstorfer, 1896) – Sulawesi blue triangle
- ?Graphium protensor (Gistel,1857) Papilio protensor Gistel, J.,1857 Achthundert und zwanzig neue oder unbeschriebene wirbellose Theire charakterisirt von Doctor Johannes Gistel Vacuna 2(2):513-606. synonym of Graphium sarpedon
- Graphium sarpedon (Linnaeus, 1758) – common bluebottle or blue triangle
- Graphium septentrionicolus Page & Treadaway, 2013
- Graphium stresemanni (Rothschild, 1916)
- Graphium teredon (C. & R. Felder, 1865) – narrow banded bluebottle
- Graphium weiskei (Ribbe, 1900) – purple spotted swallowtail

species group: eurypylus

- Graphium albociliatus (Fruhstorfer, 1901) – India (Assam), Myanmar, Laos, Vietnam, China (Yunnan) [Note in some schemes a subspecies, i.e. Graphium evemon albociliatus (Fruhstorfer, 1901)
- Graphium agamemnon (Linnaeus, 1758) – tailed jay or green-spotted triangle
- Graphium arycles (Boisduval, 1836) – spotted jay
- Graphium bathycles (Zinken, 1831)
- Graphium chironides (Honrath, 1884) – veined jay
- Graphium doson (C. Felder & R. Felder, 1864) – common jay
- Graphium eurypylus (Linnaeus, 1758) – great jay or pale green triangle
- Graphium evemon (Boisduval, 1836) – lesser jay
- Graphium leechi (Rothschild, 1895)
- Graphium macfarlanei (Butler, 1877) – green triangle butterfly or green triangle
- Graphium meeki (Rothschild & Jordan, 1901) – Meek's graphium
- Graphium meyeri (Hopffer, 1874)
- Graphium procles (Grose-Smith, 1887)

species group: wallacei

- Graphium browni (Godman & Salvin, 1879)
- Graphium hicetaon (Mathew, 1886)
- Graphium sandawanum Yamamoto, 1977 – Apo swallowtail
- Graphium wallacei (Hewitson, 1858)

subgenus: Arisbe Hübner, [1819]

species group: antheus

- Graphium antheus (Cramer, [1779]) – large striped swordtail
- Graphium evombar (Boisduval, 1836)

species group: policenes

- Graphium biokoensis Gauthier, 1984 – Gauthier's striped swordtail
- Graphium colonna (Ward, 1873) – black swordtail or mamba swordtail
- Graphium gudenusi (Rebel, 1911)
- Graphium illyris (Hewitson, 1872) - cream-banded swordtail
- Graphium junodi (Trimen, 1893) – Junod's swordtail
- Graphium kirbyi (Hewitson, 1872) – Kirby's swordtail
- Graphium liponesco (Suffert, 1904) – long-tailed striped swordtail
- Graphium policenes (Cramer, [1775]) – small striped swordtail or common swordtail
- Graphium policenoides (Holland, 1892)
- Graphium polistratus (Grose-Smith, 1889) – dancing swordtail
- Graphium porthaon (Hewitson, 1865) – coastal swordtail, cream-striped swordtail, or dark swordtail

species group: angolanus

- Graphium angolanus (Goeze, 1779) – Angola white lady (swordtail)
- Graphium endochus (Boisduval, 1836)
- Graphium morania (Angas, 1849) – white lady (swallowtail) or small white-lady swordtail
- Graphium ridleyanus (White, 1843) - acraea swordtail
- Graphium schaffgotschi (Niepelt, 1927) – Schaffgotsch's swordtail
- Graphium taboranus (Oberthür, 1886)

species group: leonidas

- Graphium cyrnus (Boisduval, 1836)
- Graphium leonidas (Fabricius, 1793) – veined swordtail, veined swallowtail, or common graphium
- Graphium levassori Oberthür, 1890 – yellow lady

species group: tynderaeus

- Graphium tynderaeus (Fabricius, 1793) – electric green swordtail or green-spotted swallowtail
- Graphium latreillianus (Godart, 1819) – coppery swordtail

species group: philonoe

- Graphium philonoe (Ward, 1873) – eastern white-lady swordtail, eastern graphium, white-dappled swallowtail

species group: adamastor

- Graphium abri Smith & Vane-Wright, 2001
- Graphium adamastor (Boisduval, 1836) – Boisduval's white-lady
- Graphium agamedes (Westwood, 1842) – Westwood's white-lady or glassy graphium
- Graphium almansor (Honrath, 1884) – Almansor white-lady swordtail or Honrath's white-lady
- Graphium auriger (Butler, 1876)
- Graphium aurivilliusi (Seeldrayers, 1896)
- Graphium fulleri (Grose-Smith, 1883)
- Graphium hachei (Dewitz, 1881)
- Graphium kigoma Carcasson, 1964
- Graphium olbrechtsi Berger, 1950
- Graphium poggianus (Honrath, 1884)
- Graphium rileyi Berger, 1950 - Riley's graphium
- Graphium schubotzi (Schultze, 1913)
- Graphium simoni (Aurivillius, 1899)
- Graphium ucalegon (Hewitson, 1865) – creamy graphium
- Graphium ucalegonides (Staudinger, 1884)

subgenus: Pathysa Reakirt, 1865 (See also species group: antiphates)

- Graphium agetes (Westwood, 1841) – fourbar swordtail
- Graphium androcles (Boisduval, 1836) – lion swordtail, giant swordtail
- Graphium antiphates (Cramer, [1775]) – fivebar swordtail
- Graphium aristeus (Stoll, [1780]) – chain swordtail
- Graphium delessertii (Guérin-Méneville, 1839) – Malayan zebra
- Graphium decolor (Staudinger, 1888)
- Graphium deucalion (Boisduval, 1836) – yellow zebra
- Graphium dorcus (de Haan, 1840) – Tabitha's swordtail
- Graphium ebertorum Koçak, 1983
- Graphium encelades (Boisduval, 1836)
- Graphium epaminondas (Oberthür, 1879) – Andaman swordtail
- Graphium euphrates (C. Felder & R. Felder, 1862) – Euphrates swordtail
- Graphium euphratoides (Eimer, 1889)
- Graphium idaeoides (Hewitson, 1853)
- Graphium macareus (Godart, 1819) – lesser zebra
- (for Graphium megaera (Staudinger, 1888) see Graphium ebertorum Koçak, 1983)
- Graphium megarus (Westwood, 1844) – spotted zebra

- Graphium nomius (Esper, 1799) – spot swordtail
- Graphium phidias (Oberthür, 1906)
- Graphium ramaceus (Westwood, 1872) – Pendlebury's zebra
- Graphium rhesus (Boisduval, 1836) – monkey swordtail
- Graphium stratiotes (Grose-Smith, 1887)
- Graphium stratocles (C. Felder & R. Felder, 1861)
- Graphium thule (Wallace, 1865)
- Graphium xenocles (Doubleday, 1842) – great zebra

subgenus: Paranticopsis Wood-Mason & de Nicéville, 1887 See Pathysa Reakirt, 1865

subgenus: Pazala Moore, 1888

- Graphium alebion (Gray, [1853])
- Graphium eurous (Leech, [1893]) – sixbar swordtail
- Graphium glycerion (Gray, 1831) – spectacle swordtail
- Graphium incerta Bang-Haas, 1927
- Graphium mandarinus (Oberthür, 1879) – spectacle swordtail
- Graphium mullah (Alphéraky 1897)::* Graphium tamerlana (Oberthür, 1876)
- Graphium timur (Ney, 1911) synonymised with Graphium mullah by Cotton and Racheli, T., 2007
- Graphium wenlingae Hu, Condamine, Monastyrskii & Cotton, 2019

== See also ==
- Protographium
