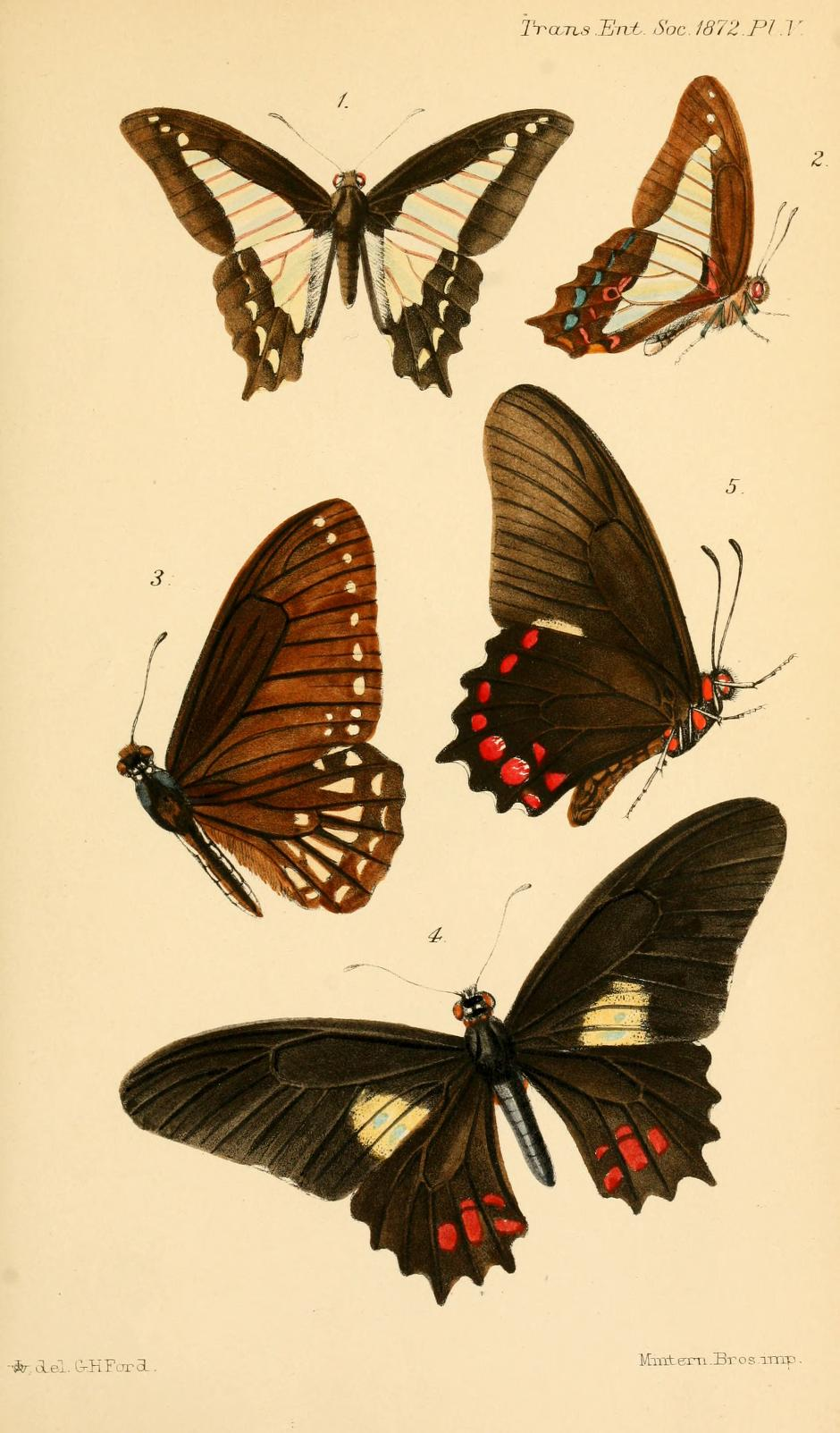
- Westwood's plate depicting Graphium ramaceus, figure 3

Scientific classification
- Kingdom: Animalia
- Phylum: Arthropoda
- Clade: Pancrustacea
- Class: Insecta
- Order: Lepidoptera
- Family: Papilionidae
- Genus: Graphium
- Species: G. ramaceus

Binomial name
- Graphium ramaceus (Westwood, 1872)

Synonyms
- Papilio ramaceus Westwood, 1872; Papilio schoenbergianus Honrath, 1888; Papilio schönbergianus Honrath, 1888; Paranticopsis ramaceus ramaceus; Papilio ramaceus pendleburyi Corbet, 1941; Papilio leucothoe Westwood, 1844; Papilio leucothoë Westwood, 1844; Papilio dealbatus Pendlebury, 1939; Papilio leucothoë var. interjectus Honrath, [1893]

= Graphium ramaceus =

Species of butterfly

Graphium ramaceus, the Pendlebury's zebra, is a species of butterfly in the family Papilionidae (swallowtails). It is found in parts of the Indomalayan realm.

== Subspecies ==
- G. r. ramaceus (Borneo)
- G. r. pendleburyi (Corbet, 1941) (Peninsular Malaya, Langkawi Island)
- G. r. interjectus (Honrath, 1893) (Sumatra)

== Description ==
ramaceus Westw. (47 b). A much darkened form. Male: the discal stripes of the forewing are suppressed, at most there are traces of two spots before the hindmargin. The discal stripes of the hindwing are short and always much narrower than in the preceding forms, usually much narrower than the interspaces. Female without discal spot on either wing; the submarginal spots small, partly suppressed, beneath somewhat larger and here there are also faint discal stripes before the abdominal margin of the hindwing. North and South Borneo Karl Jordan in Seitz (page 105) provides a description differentiating ramaceus as leucothoe from nearby taxa and discussing some forms.

== Status ==
Graphium ramaceus is uncommon, but not rare and not thought to be threatened.
