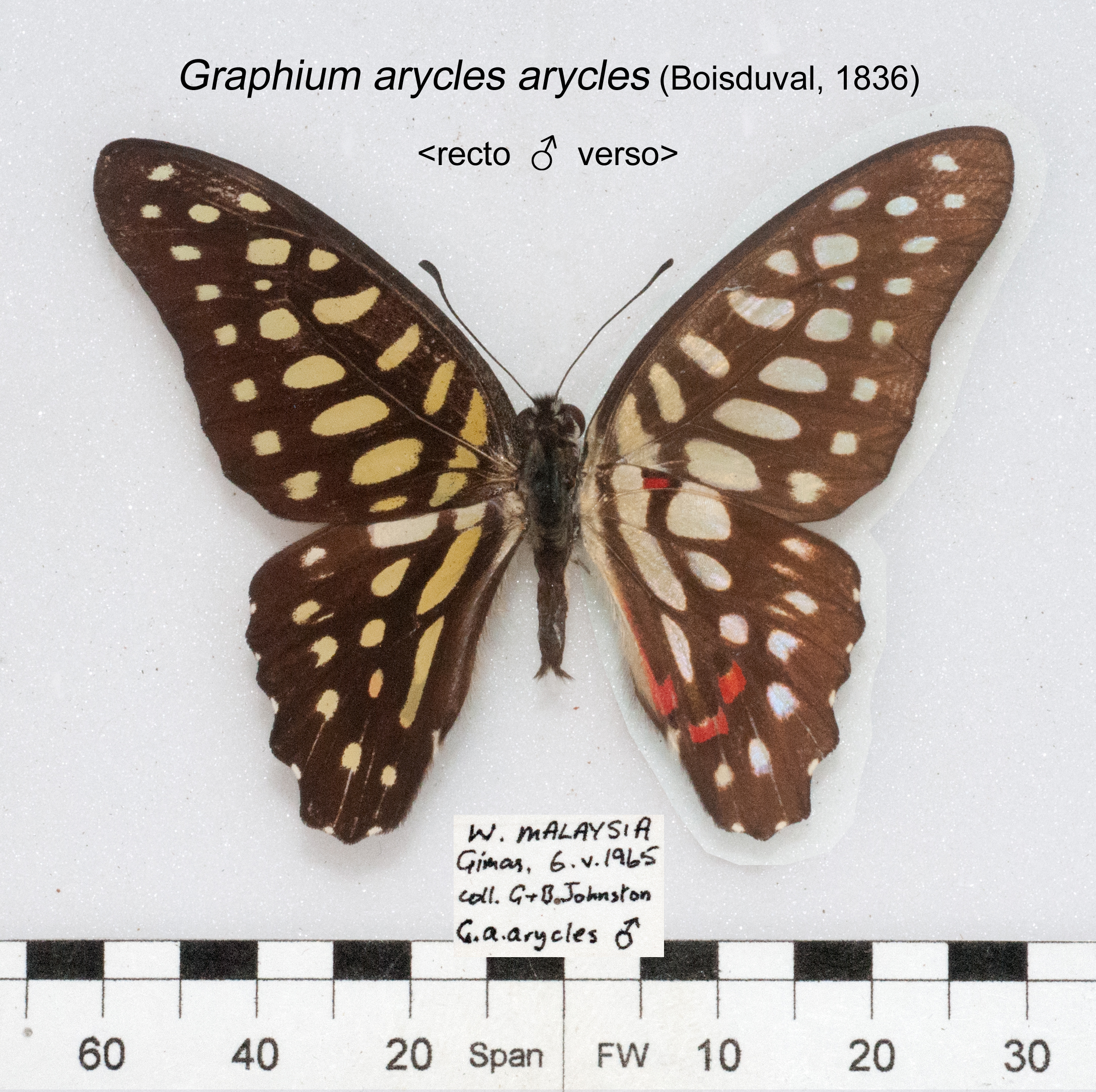

Scientific classification
- Kingdom: Animalia
- Phylum: Arthropoda
- Clade: Pancrustacea
- Class: Insecta
- Order: Lepidoptera
- Family: Papilionidae
- Genus: Graphium
- Species: G. arycles

Binomial name
- Graphium arycles Boisduval, 1836

= Graphium arycles =

Spotted jay

Species of butterfly of the family Papilionidae from the Indomalayan realm

Graphium arycles, the spotted jay, is a species of butterfly of the family Papilionidae found in the Indomalayan realm.

== Description ==
For terms see External morphology of Lepidoptera. Smaller than Graphium agamemnon, tailless. Body as in that species. Wings above with pale green patches, which often fade to yellowish (after death); on the forewing an indistinct basal band, a subbasal band, three transverse spots and a smaller apical spot in the cell, a discal row of patches, of which the 1st and 3rd are small, and a submarginal row of small spots, moreover in the subcostal spot a further isolated discal spot, the last submarginal spot double, but the anterior part placed straight before the posterior part, not as in agamemnon removed towards the disc, only 2 spots before the subcostal fork; on the hindwing a tripartite subbasal band parallel with the abdominal margin, a discal row of 4 spots, of which the 1st is large and white, and a submarginal row of 6 spots. The patches beneath almost as above, but all with silvery scaling; on the hindwing in addition a small spot at the costal between the subbasal band and the large costal discal spot and also three spots between the 3rd radial and the anal angle red, rarely yellow. The female is similar to the male.

== India ==
It is scarce and likely to be found in the extreme north east of India. It is not known to be threatened but the nominate subspecies is protected by law in India.

== Subspecies ==
- G. a. arycles Burma onward to Peninsular Malaya, Java, Sumatra, Bangka and Borneo
- G. a. perinthus (Fruhstorfer, 1915) Philippines
- G. a. sphinx (Fruhstorfer, 1899) Cambodia.-larger than arycles and has narrower spots in the cell of the forewing, and the red spots on the under surface of the hindwing of arycles are here replaced by yellow or blue green ones.

== See also ==
- Papilionidae
- List of butterflies of India
- List of butterflies of India (Papilionidae)
