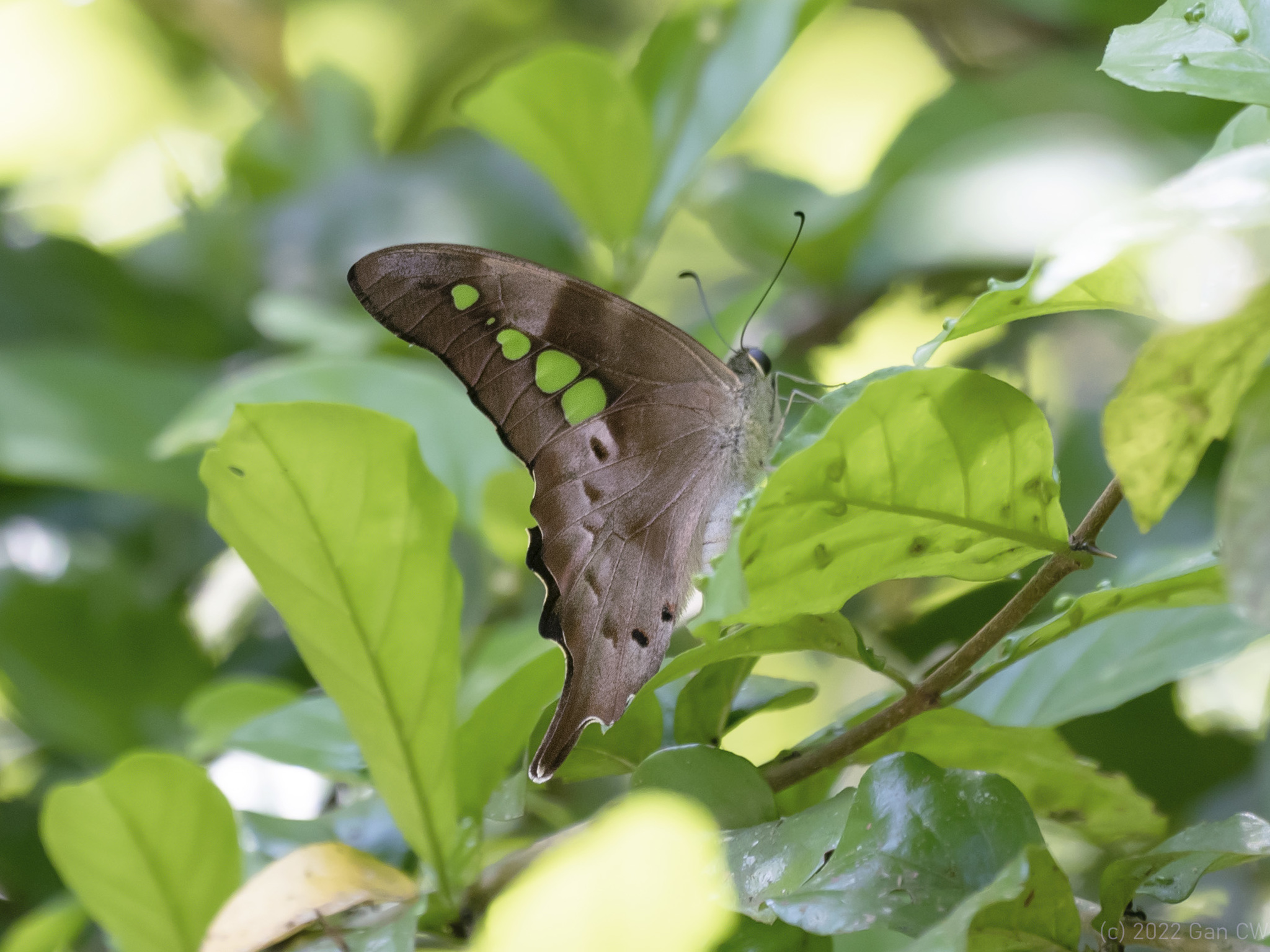

Scientific classification
- Kingdom: Animalia
- Phylum: Arthropoda
- Clade: Pancrustacea
- Class: Insecta
- Order: Lepidoptera
- Family: Papilionidae
- Genus: Graphium
- Species: G. empedovana

Binomial name
- Graphium empedovana (Corbet, 1941)

Synonyms
- Papilio empedovana Corbet, 1941

= Graphium empedovana =

Species of butterfly

Graphium empedovana is a species of butterfly of the family Papilionidae, that is found in the Philippines (Balabac, Busuanga, Palawan). The species was first described by Alexander Steven Corbet in 1941.

Sometimes regarded as a subspecies of Graphium codrus and sometimes as conspecific with Graphium empedocles. D'Abrera, 1982: p. 96, places it as subspecies Graphium codrus empedovana.

The larva feeds on Hernandia peltata.

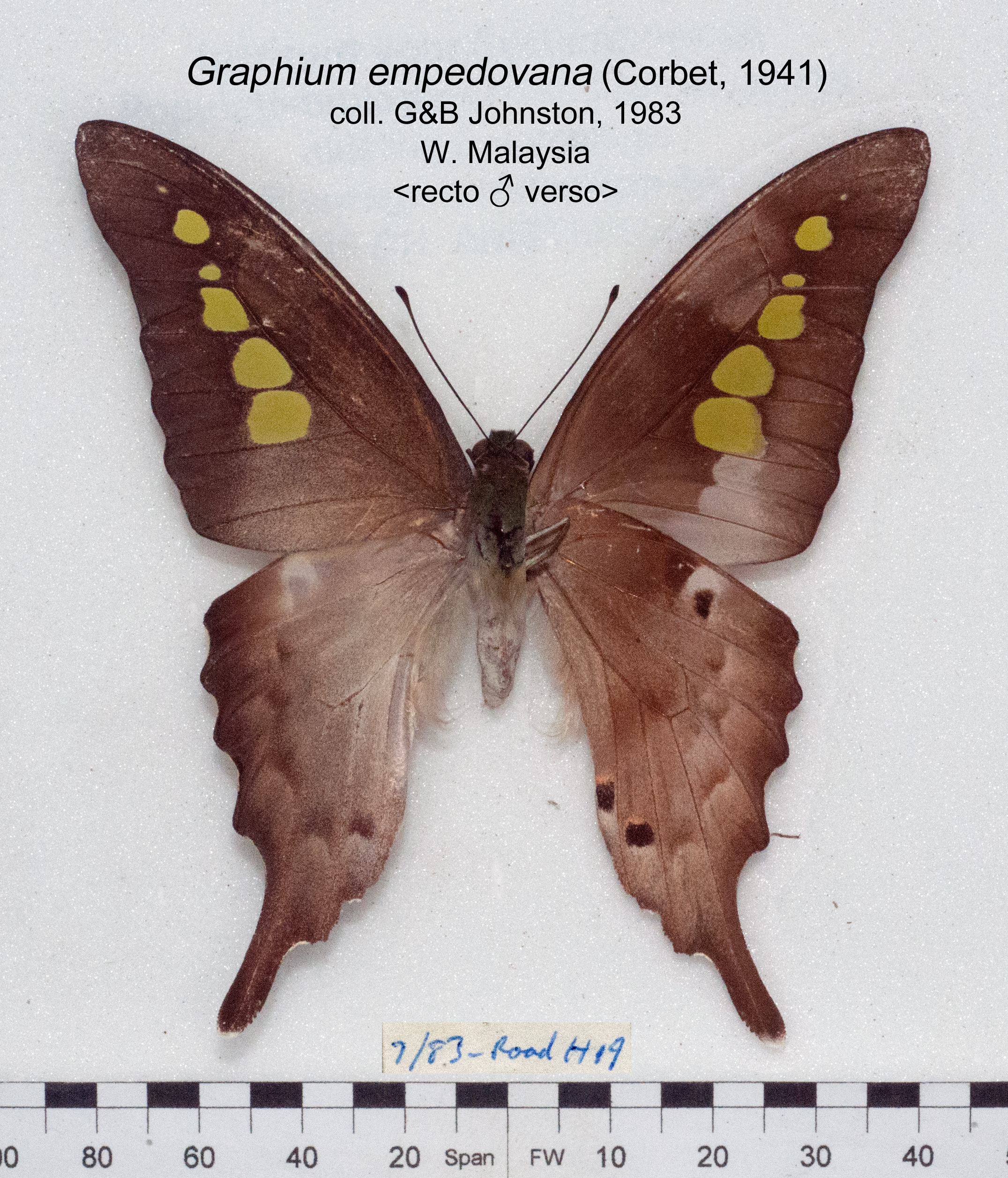

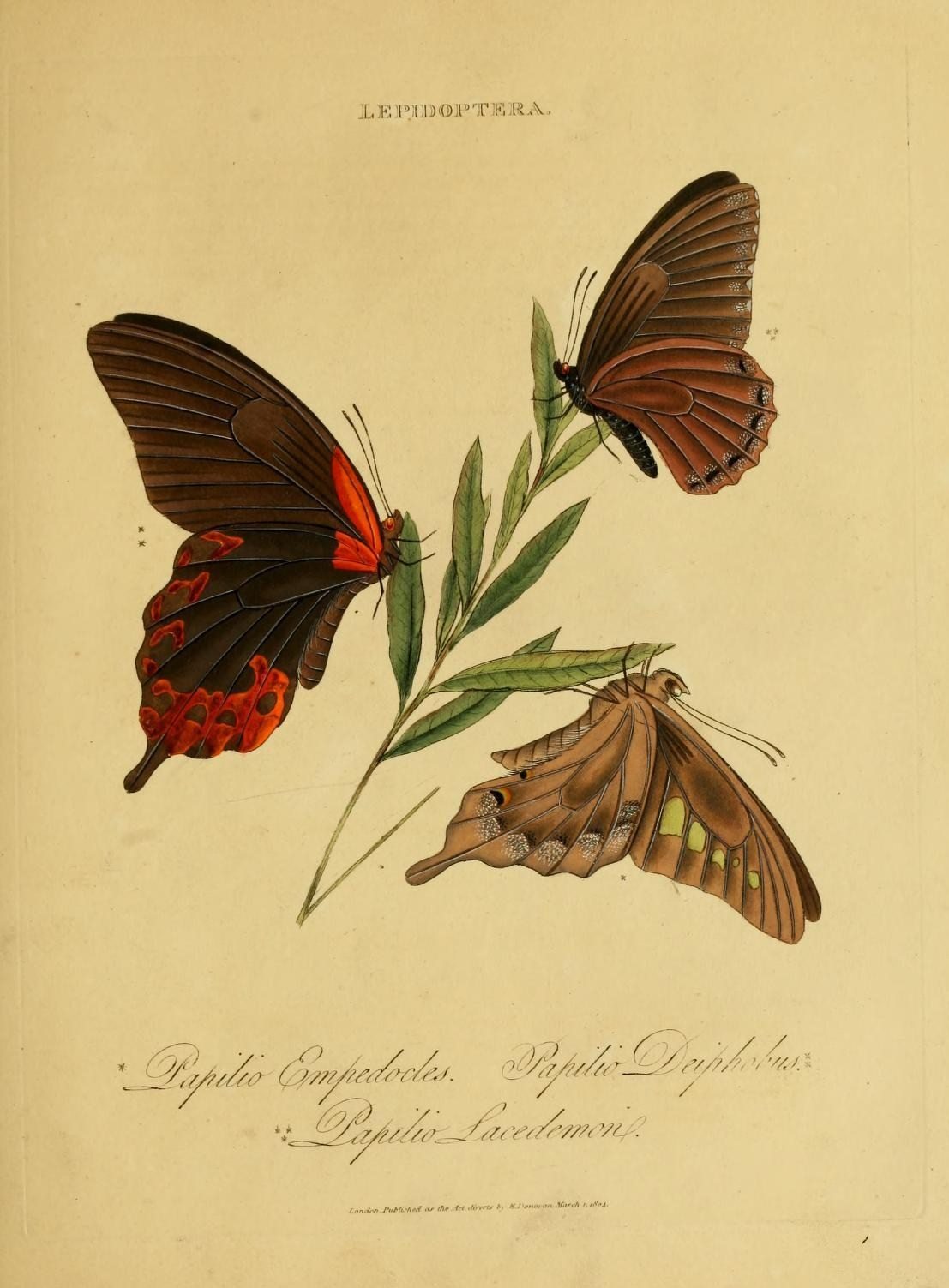

== Subspecies ==
- G. e. empedovana
- G. e. inornatum
- G. e. miurai
- G. e. splendidulum
