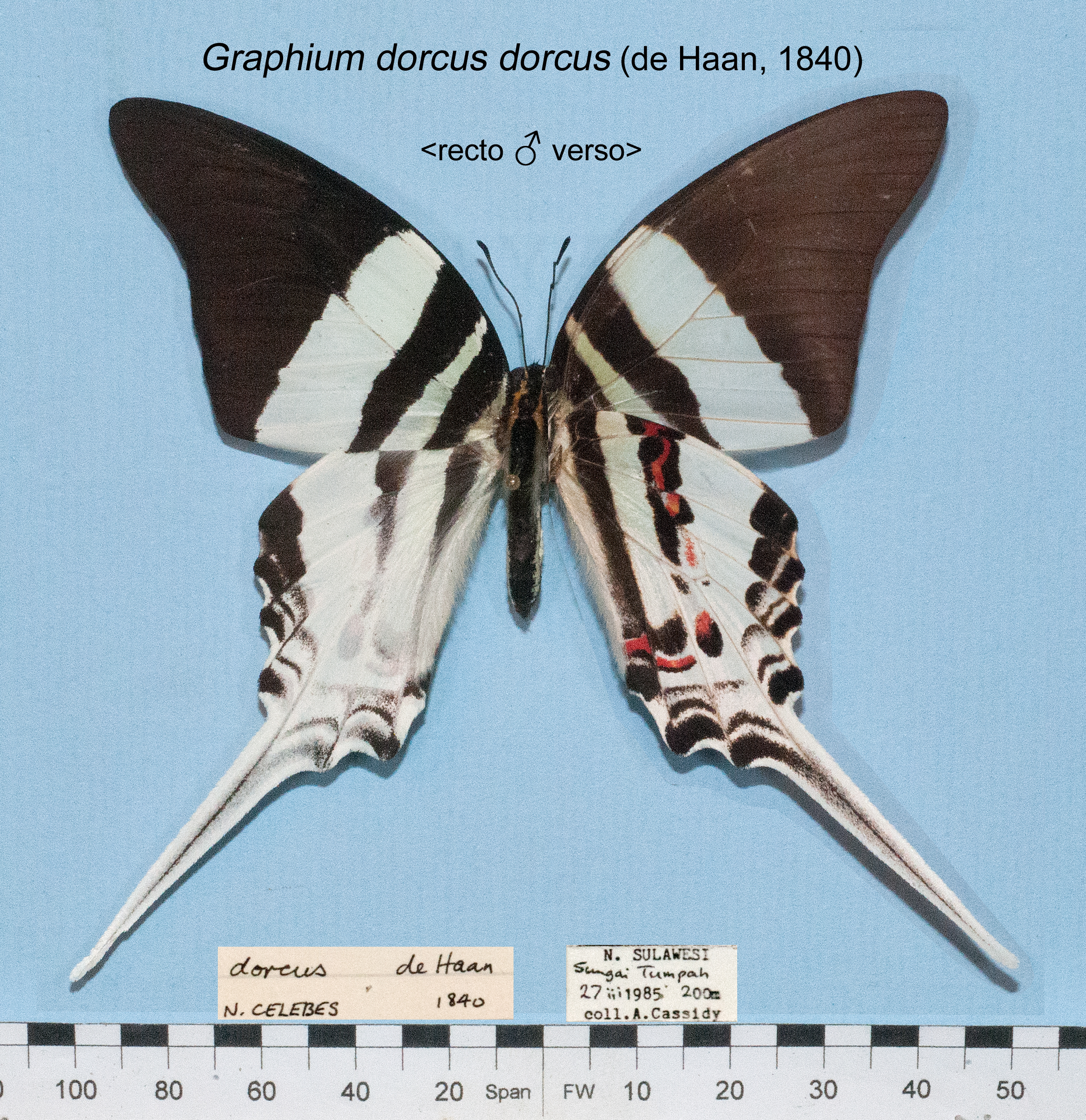

Conservation status
- Least Concern (IUCN 3.1)

Scientific classification
- Kingdom: Animalia
- Phylum: Arthropoda
- Clade: Pancrustacea
- Class: Insecta
- Order: Lepidoptera
- Family: Papilionidae
- Genus: Graphium
- Species: G. dorcus

Binomial name
- Graphium dorcus (de Haan, 1840)

Synonyms
- Papilio dorcus de Haan, 1840; Pathysa dorcus

= Graphium dorcus =

Species of butterfly

Graphium dorcus, or Tabitha's swordtail, is a butterfly found in Sulawesi, Indonesia, that belongs to the swallowtail family. The species was first described by Wilhem de Haan in 1840.

== Subspecies ==
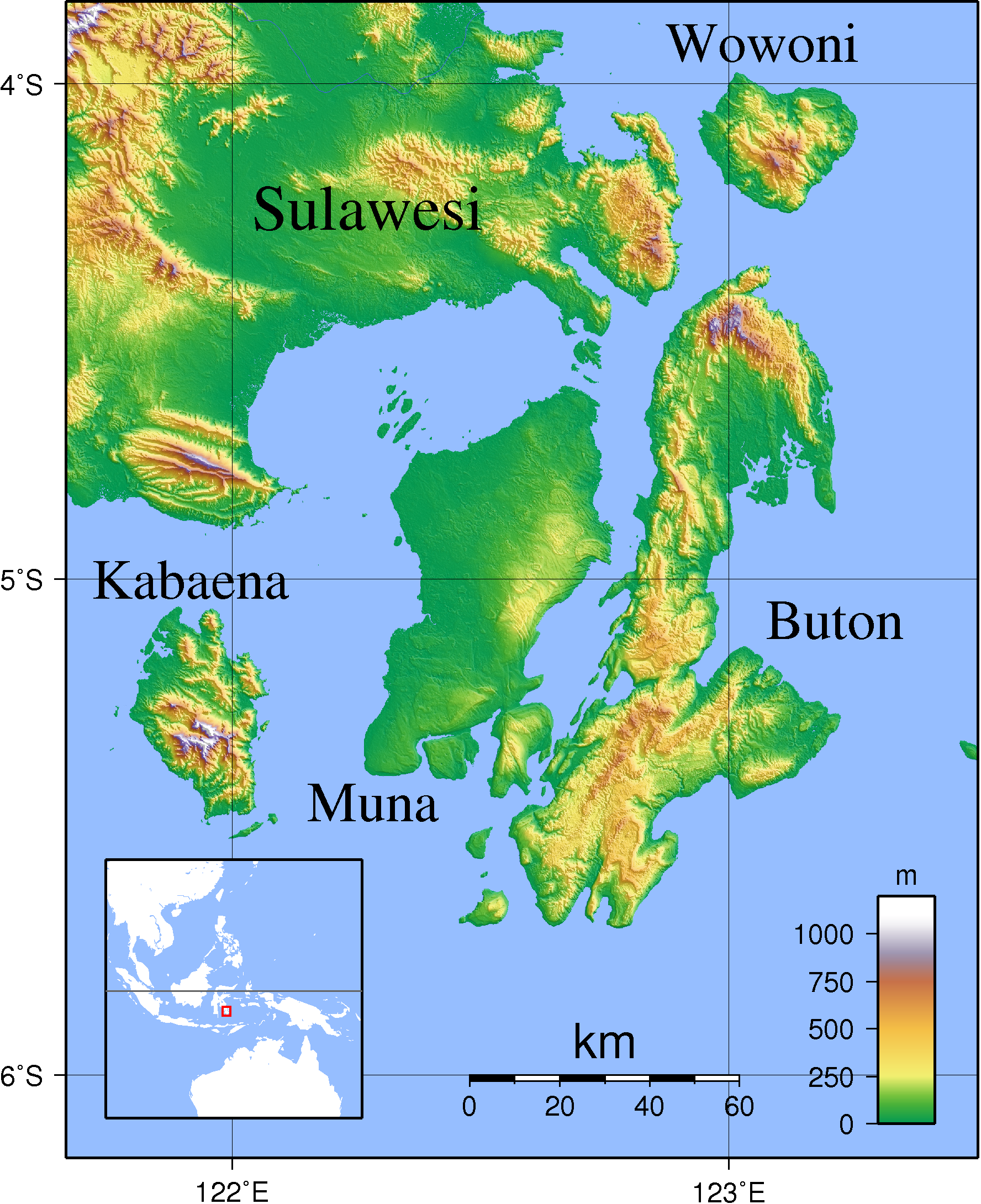

- G. d. dorcus (northern Sulawesi)
- G. d. butungensis Hanafusa, 1997 (Buton)

== Etymology ==
It is named for the biblical Dorcas, who in Aramaic and other languages is called Tabitha.
