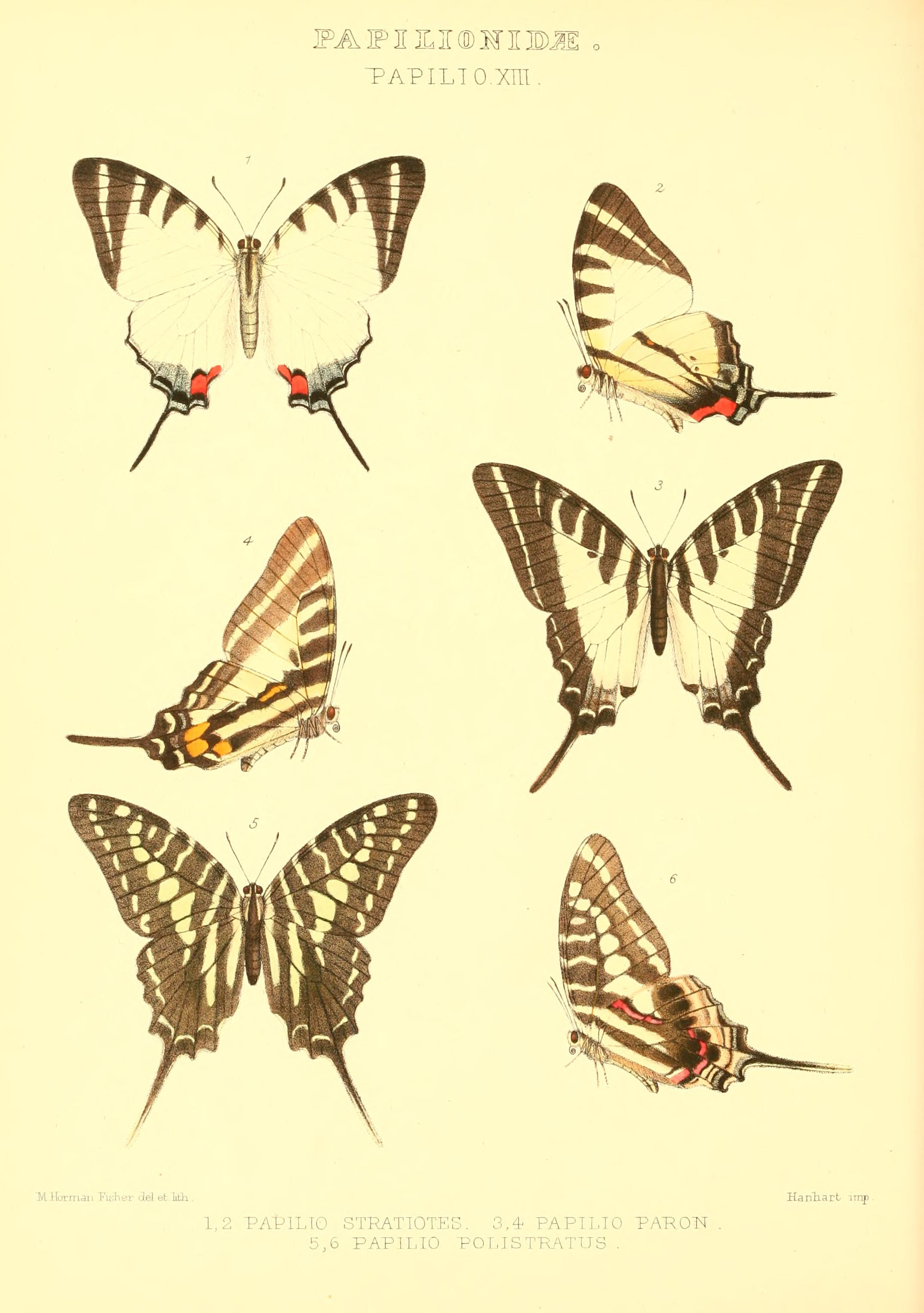
- Figures 1 and 2

Scientific classification
- Kingdom: Animalia
- Phylum: Arthropoda
- Clade: Pancrustacea
- Class: Insecta
- Order: Lepidoptera
- Family: Papilionidae
- Genus: Graphium
- Species: G. stratiotes

Binomial name
- Graphium stratiotes (Grose-Smith, 1887)

Synonyms
- Papilio stratiotes Grose-Smith, 1887

= Graphium stratiotes =

Species of butterfly

Graphium stratiotes is a butterfly found in Borneo that belongs to the swallowtail family.

== Subspecies ==
- G. s. stratiotes
- G. s. sukirmani
