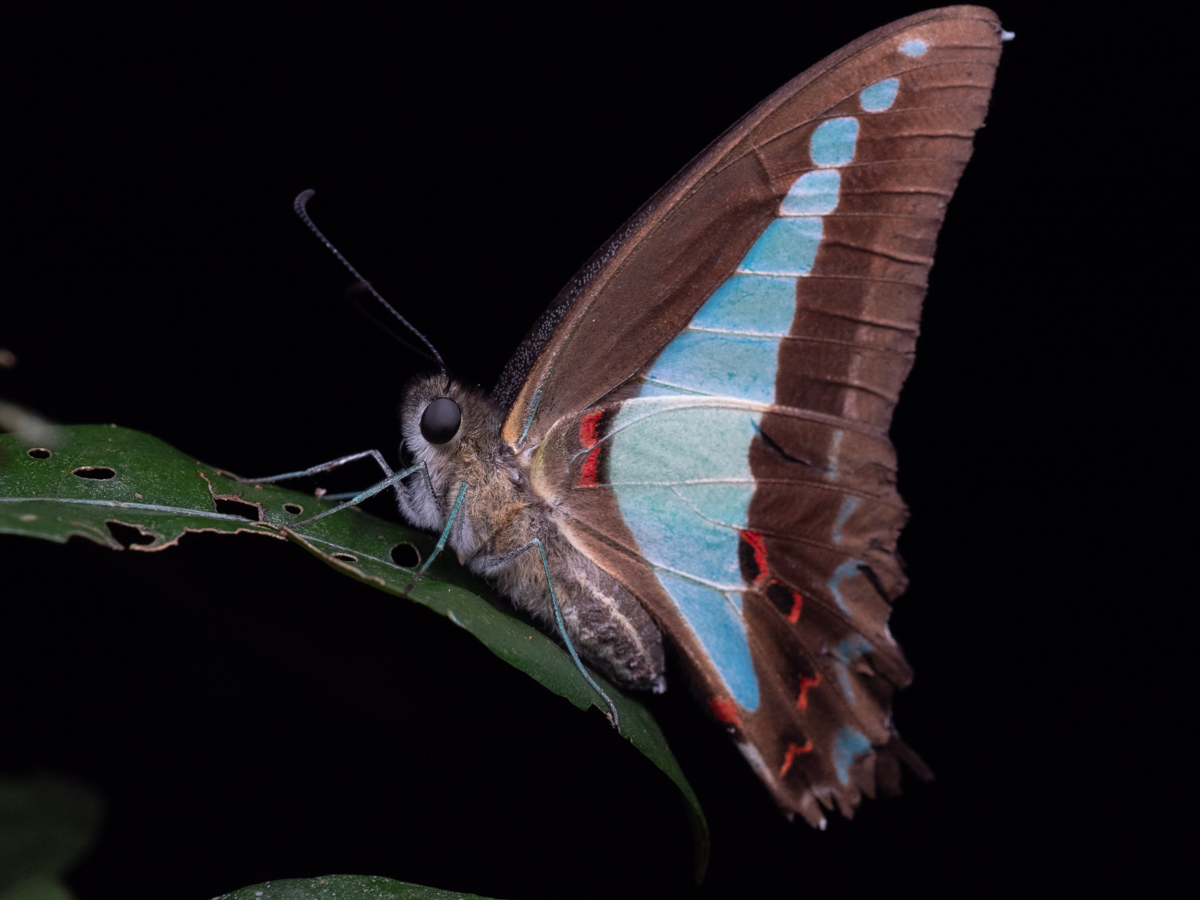

Scientific classification
- Kingdom: Animalia
- Phylum: Arthropoda
- Clade: Pancrustacea
- Class: Insecta
- Order: Lepidoptera
- Family: Papilionidae
- Genus: Graphium
- Species: G. choredon

Binomial name
- Graphium choredon (C. Felder & R. Felder, 1864)

= Graphium choredon =

Blue triangle

Species of butterfly

Graphium choredon, the blue triangle, is a species of swallowtail butterfly. It is found in Australia.

== Description ==
Status revised to full species by Page and Treadaway (2013)

== Habitat ==
In eastern Australia, they have adapted to a drier subtropical environment, and are commonly seen in suburban gardens in Queensland and New South Wales.
