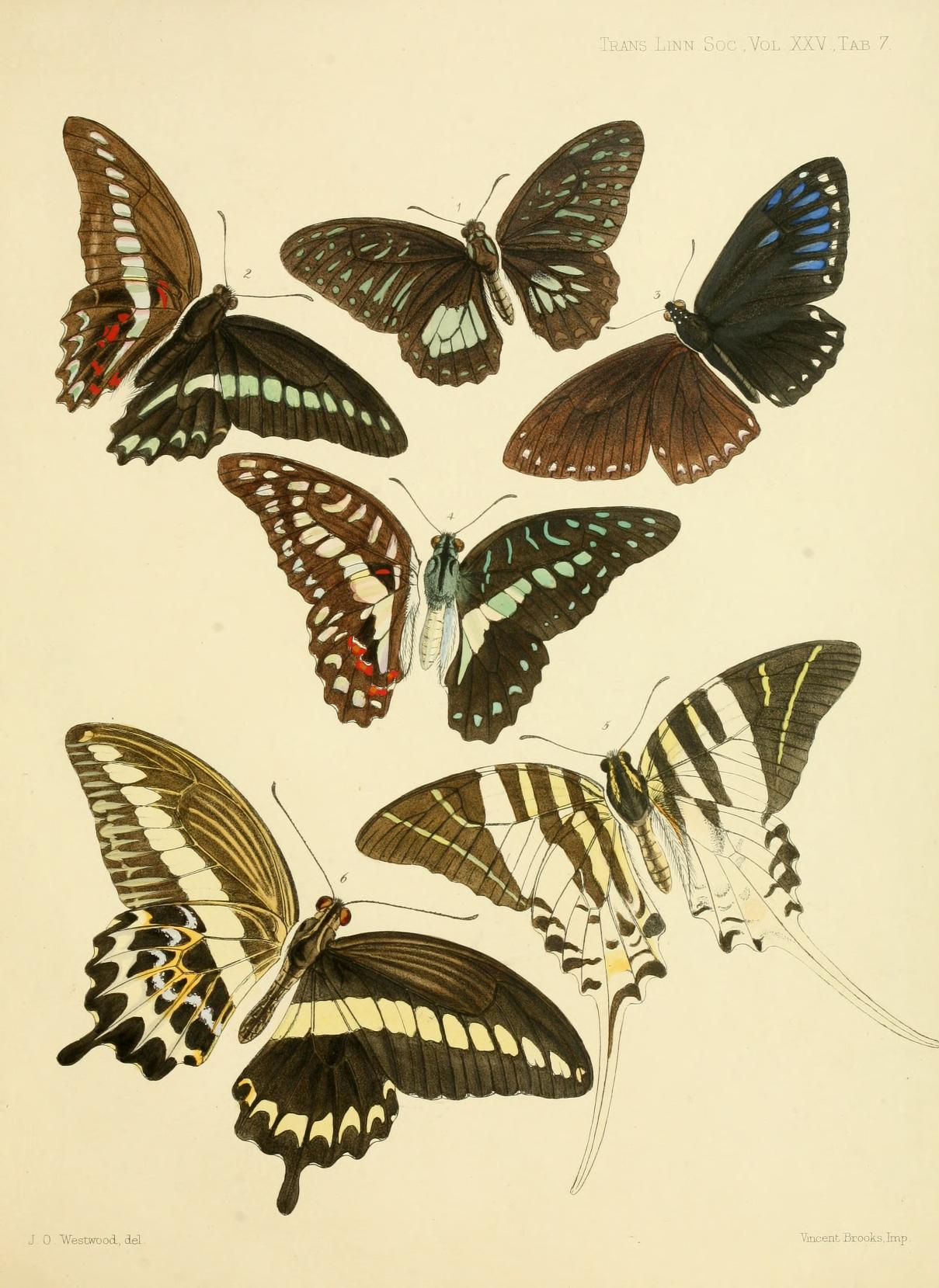
- Figure 2
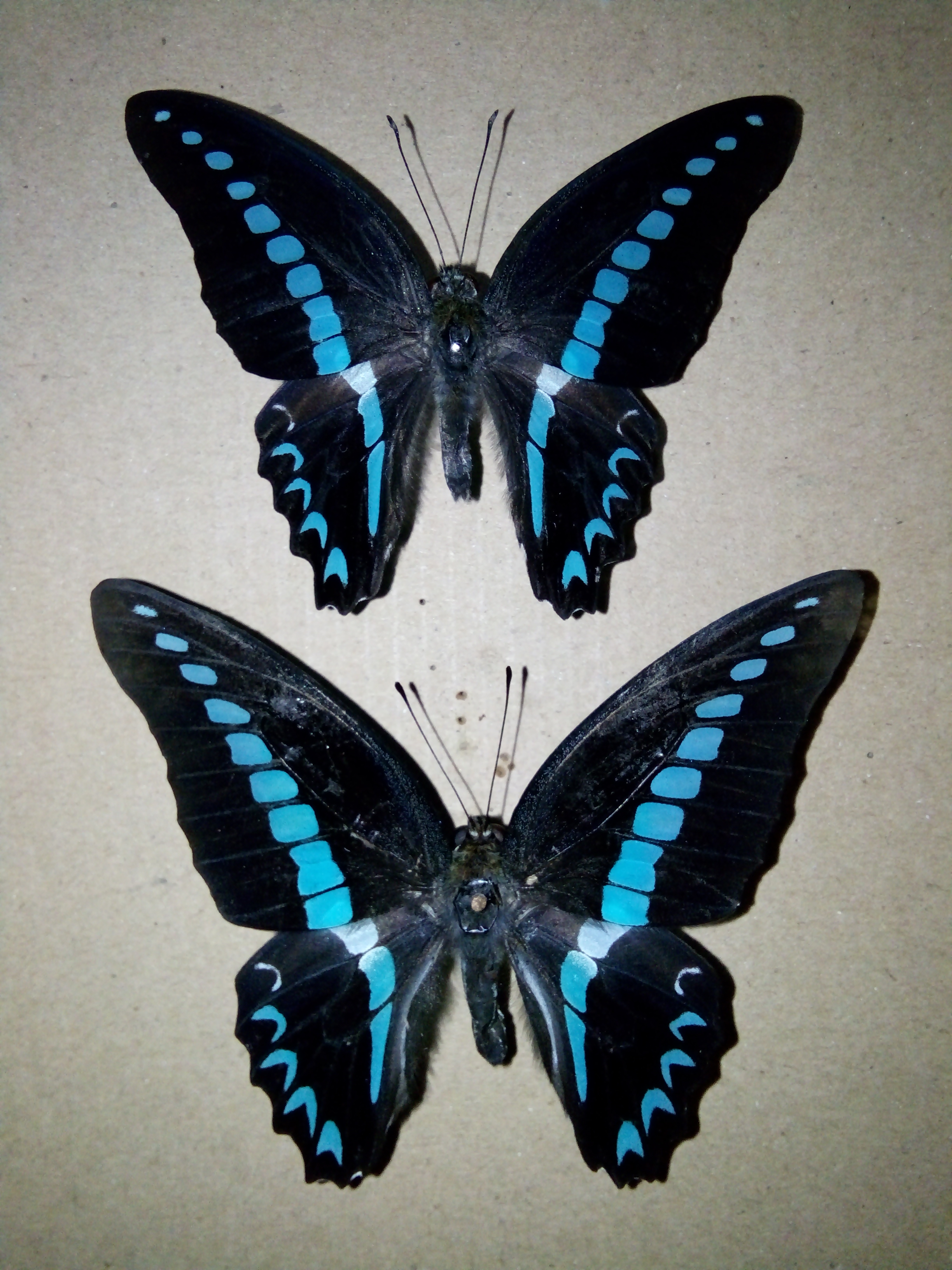
- Male & female, North Gorontalo

Scientific classification
- Kingdom: Animalia
- Phylum: Arthropoda
- Clade: Pancrustacea
- Class: Insecta
- Order: Lepidoptera
- Family: Papilionidae
- Genus: Graphium
- Species: G. anthedon

Binomial name
- Graphium anthedon (C. & R. Felder, 1864)

Synonyms
- Papilio anthedon C. & R. Felder, 1864; Papilio sarpedon var. moluccensis Wallace, 1865; Papilio sarpedon halesus Fruhstorfer, 1907; Papilio milon C. & R. Felder, 1864; Graphium milon; Papilio miletus Wallace, 1865; Papilio sarpedon var. milon ab. milonides Honrath, 1884; Papilio sarpedon coelius Fruhstorfer, 1899

= Graphium anthedon =

Species of butterfly

Graphium anthedon is a butterfly of the family Papilionidae, that is found in the Sunda Islands in the Malay Archipelago.

== Subspecies ==
- G. a. anthedon
- G. a. milon (C. & R. Felder, 1865) (Sulawesi, Talaud, Kabaena, Buton, Banggai)
- G. a. coelius (Fruhstorfer, 1899) (Sula)

== Taxonomy ==
Treated as a full species by Vane-Wright, R. I., & R. de. Jong. 2003. The butterflies of Sulawesi: annotated checklist for a critical island fauna. Zoologische Verhandlingen 343: 1-267.

The history of this taxon is complex and related to that of Graphium milon Felder & Felder, 1865. Originally described as Papilio Latr. species anthedon Felder & Felder, 1864 and later seen as a synonym of Papilio sarpedon Linn., 1764 by Kirby (1871: 559). Treated as a subspecies of Graphium (Graphium) sarpedon (Linnaeus, 1758) by Fujioka and Nishiyama (1997: 189). Also treated as a subspecies of Graphium milon (C. & R. Felder, 1865).

Graphium milon has an interwoven history. Originally described as Papilio milon Felder & Felder, 1865 it was also seen as a synonym of Papilio sarpedon Linn., 1764 by Kirby (1871: 559). Treated as a subspecies of Graphium sarpedon Linnaeus, 1758 by D'Abrera (1982: 98) and treated as a species of Graphium by Tsukada and Nishiyama (1982: 379). Finally ranked as a subspecies of Graphium (Graphium) anthedon Felder & Felder, 1864 by Vane-Wright & de Jong (2003: 92).
