= Graphium tamerlana =

- Graphium tamerlana and related species

Scientific classification
- Kingdom: Animalia
- Phylum: Arthropoda
- Clade: Pancrustacea
- Class: Insecta
- Order: Lepidoptera
- Family: Papilionidae
- Genus: Graphium
- Species: G. tamerlana

Binomial name
- Graphium tamerlana (Oberthür, 1876)

Synonyms
- Papilio tamerlanus Oberthür, 1876; Papilio taliensis O. Bang-Haas, 1927

Species of butterfly

Graphium tamerlana is a butterfly found in China that belongs to the swallowtail family.

== Description ==
It is similar to Iphiclides podalirius. The black band at the apex of the cell of the forewing reaches only to the median vein, not extending beyond it to the hind angle, being exactly as in Graphium alebion, but in contradistinction to this insect, the orange anal spot on the hindwing of is reduced to two small obscure dots.

== Subspecies ==
- Graphium tamerlana tamerlana
- Graphium tamerlana taliensis (O. Bang-Haas, 1927) (Yunnan)

== Etymology ==
It was named to honour the Turkic ruler Tamerlane.
