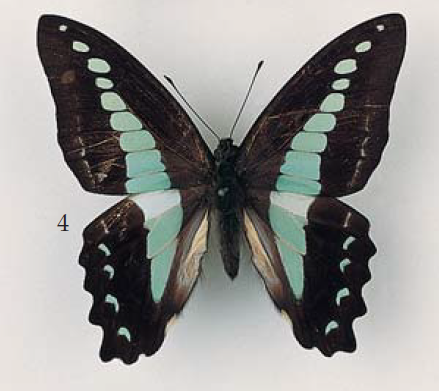
- male

Scientific classification
- Kingdom: Animalia
- Phylum: Arthropoda
- Clade: Pancrustacea
- Class: Insecta
- Order: Lepidoptera
- Family: Papilionidae
- Genus: Graphium
- Species: G. monticolus

Binomial name
- Graphium monticolus (Fruhstorfer, 1896)

Synonyms
- Papilio monticolus Fruhstorfer, 1896; Graphium sarpedon textrix Tsukada & Nishiyaa, 1980; Papilio sarpedon monticulus ab. longilinea Joicey & Talbot, 1922; Papilio sarpedon monticulus ab. longilineatus Toxopeus, 1950

= Graphium monticolus =

Species of butterfly

Graphium monticolus, the Sulawesi blue triangle, is a butterfly of the family Papilionidae that is found in Sulawesi in Indonesia.

== Taxonomy ==
Originally described as a subspecies of Papilio (Papilio sarpedon monticolus Fruhstorfer, 1896) later treated as a full species and placed in Graphium by most authorities (Graphium monticolus Fruhstorfer, 1896). Ranked again as a subspecies of Graphium sarpedon (Graphium sarpedon monticolus Fruhstorfer, 1896) by Tsukada and Nishiyama, 1982.

== Subspecies ==
- Graphium monticolus monticolus
- Graphium monticolus textrix Tsukada & Nishiyaa, 1980
