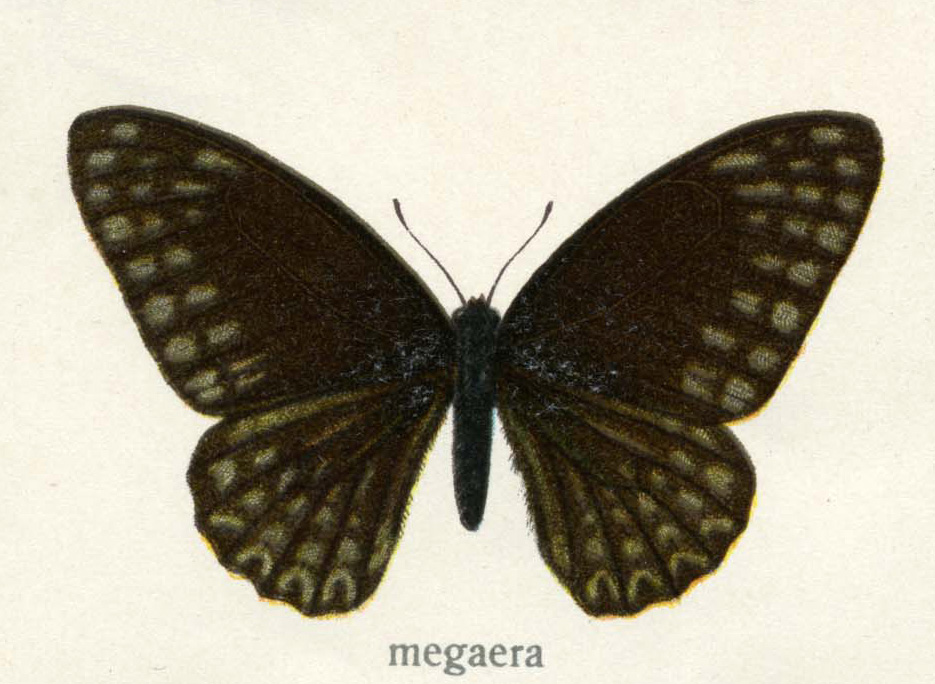

Conservation status
- Vulnerable (IUCN 2.3)

Scientific classification
- Kingdom: Animalia
- Phylum: Arthropoda
- Clade: Pancrustacea
- Class: Insecta
- Order: Lepidoptera
- Family: Papilionidae
- Genus: Graphium
- Species: G. megaera

Binomial name
- Graphium megaera Staudinger, 1888

= Graphium megaera =

Species of butterfly

Graphium megaera is a species of butterfly in the family Papilionidae. It is endemic to the Philippines.

== Sources ==
- Page M. G.P & Treadaway, C. G. 2003 Schmetterlinge der Erde, Butterflies of the world Part XVII (17), Papilionidae IX Papilionidae of the Philippine Islands. Edited by Erich Bauer and Thomas Frankenbach Keltern : Goecke & Evers; Canterbury : Hillside Books. ISBN 978-3-931374-45-7
