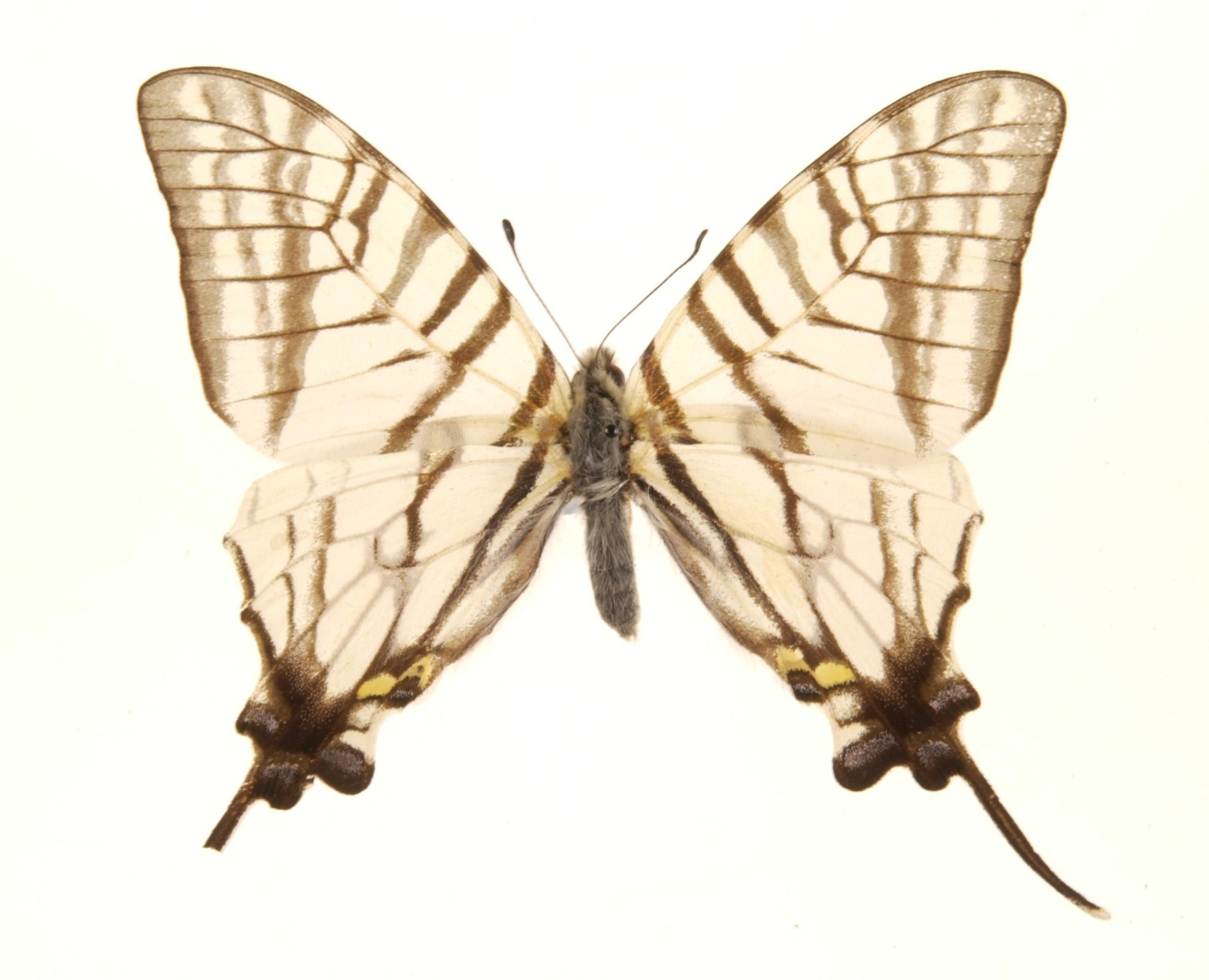

Scientific classification
- Kingdom: Animalia
- Phylum: Arthropoda
- Class: Insecta
- Order: Lepidoptera
- Family: Papilionidae
- Genus: Graphium
- Species: G. mandarinus

Binomial name
- Graphium mandarinus Oberthür, 1879

Synonyms
- Pazala mandarinus

= Graphium mandarinus =

Spectacle swordtail

Species of butterfly

Graphium mandarinus, the spectacle swordtail, which is native to India, is a butterfly of the swallowtail family (Papilionidae). It belongs to subgenus Pazala of the swordtails, that is, genus Graphium.

Graphium (Pazala) glycerion Gray is considered by some as the correct nomenclature of this butterfly.

It has a related species, the sixbar swordtail Graphium eurous, which is also found in India.

== Description ==
Upperside dead white or very pale cream colour. Forewing: cell partially, and interspaces between the dusky black outer discal markings more or less semitransparent; cell crossed by five black bands, the basal two of which extend to the dorsal margin, the subapical to a little below the modim vein; a black band along the discocellulars, joined at costal margin and above lower apex of cell to the band traversing the cell near its apex; a broad transverse postdiscal black band from near tornal angle to costa; this band double above vein 5, forms three well-marked loops; subterminal and terminal narrower transverse black bands, the former joined onto the postdiscal band near tornal angle; lastly, the postdiscal band outwardly and the terminal band inwardly, broadly and diffusely bordered with dusky black. Hindwing: a narrow black line from base along the dorsum, a broader black line along vein 1, joined below the cell by a broad black band that crosses the latter subbasally, a black patch on the produced posterior portion of the wing, studded at the tornal angle with two conspicuous yellow spots, below which there is a triangular white dorsal mark; the black patch with three somewhat obscure blue subterminal lunules; the tail narrowly edged with white; a narrow black medial line from costa that crosses near apex of cell and terminates on the median nervure; at the upper and lower ends of this are loops formed of slender black lines, in the female well marked, in the male seen only by transparency from the underside; finally, discal, postdiscal and subterminal slender black transverse lines from the costa terminate in the black anal patch. Underside similar, with similar but much more heavily defined black markings, the upper or costal loop on the short medial transverse black line tinged with yellow; the whole of the median vein and the discocellulars broadly defined in black. Antennae black; head, thorax and abdomen black, with some white pubescence, the head anteriorly tufted with black; head, thorax and abdomen beneath whitish yellow.

== Range ==
Nepal, Sikkim to Assam, north Myanmar and China.

== Status ==
The butterfly is thought to be not common. However, the exact status and distribution of this butterfly are not well known and much work is needed on these aspects.

== Habitat ==
These butterflies are found in open places in wooded country and, like the sixbar swordtail, prefer to inhabit favoured spots.

== Habits ==
Generally, the habits of the spectacle swordtail are similar to those of the sixbar swordtail.

== Life cycle ==
The butterfly can be seen from April to May at heights of 4,000 to 7,000 feet (1,200 to 2,100 m).
