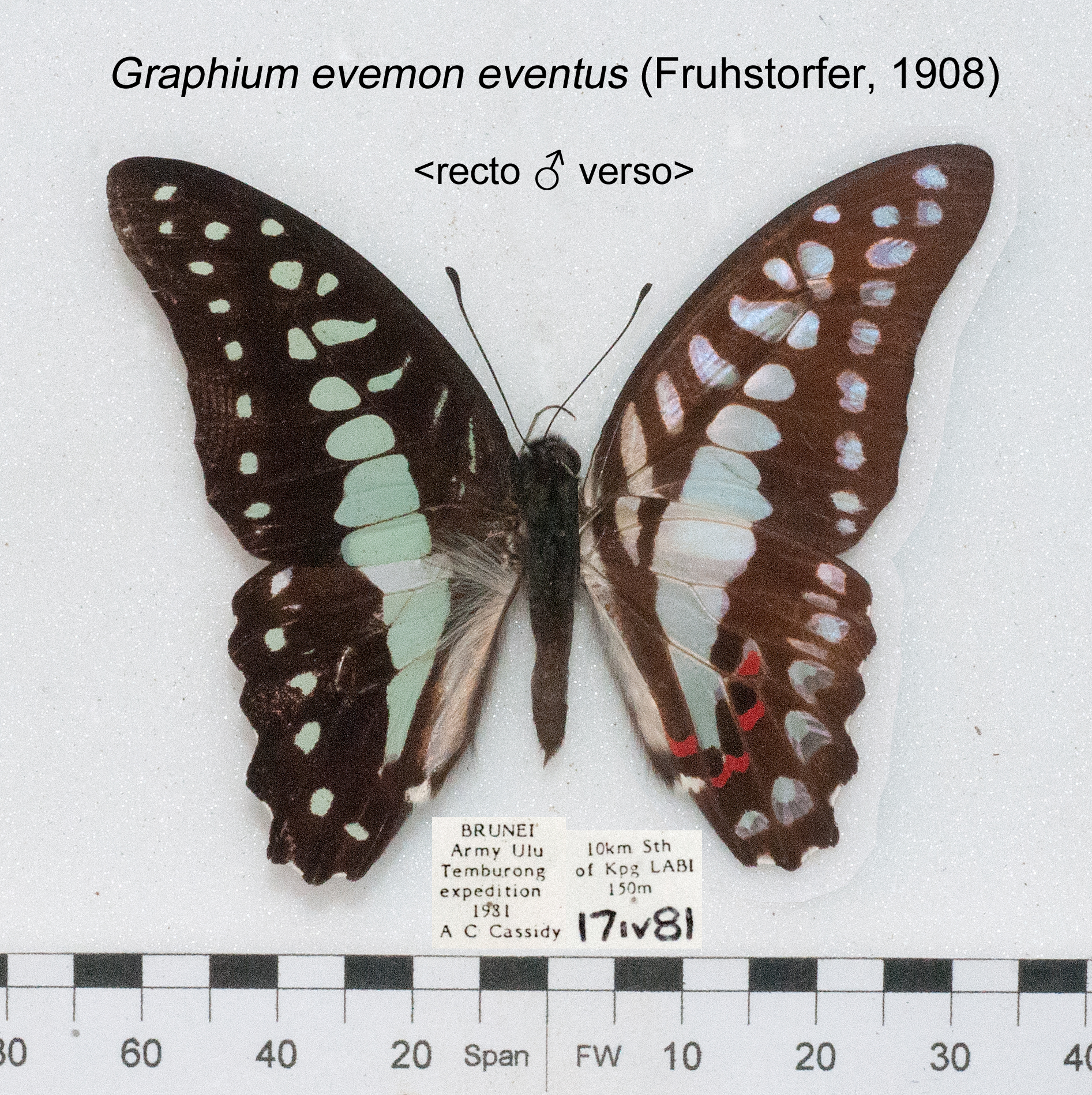
- Graphium evemon eventus
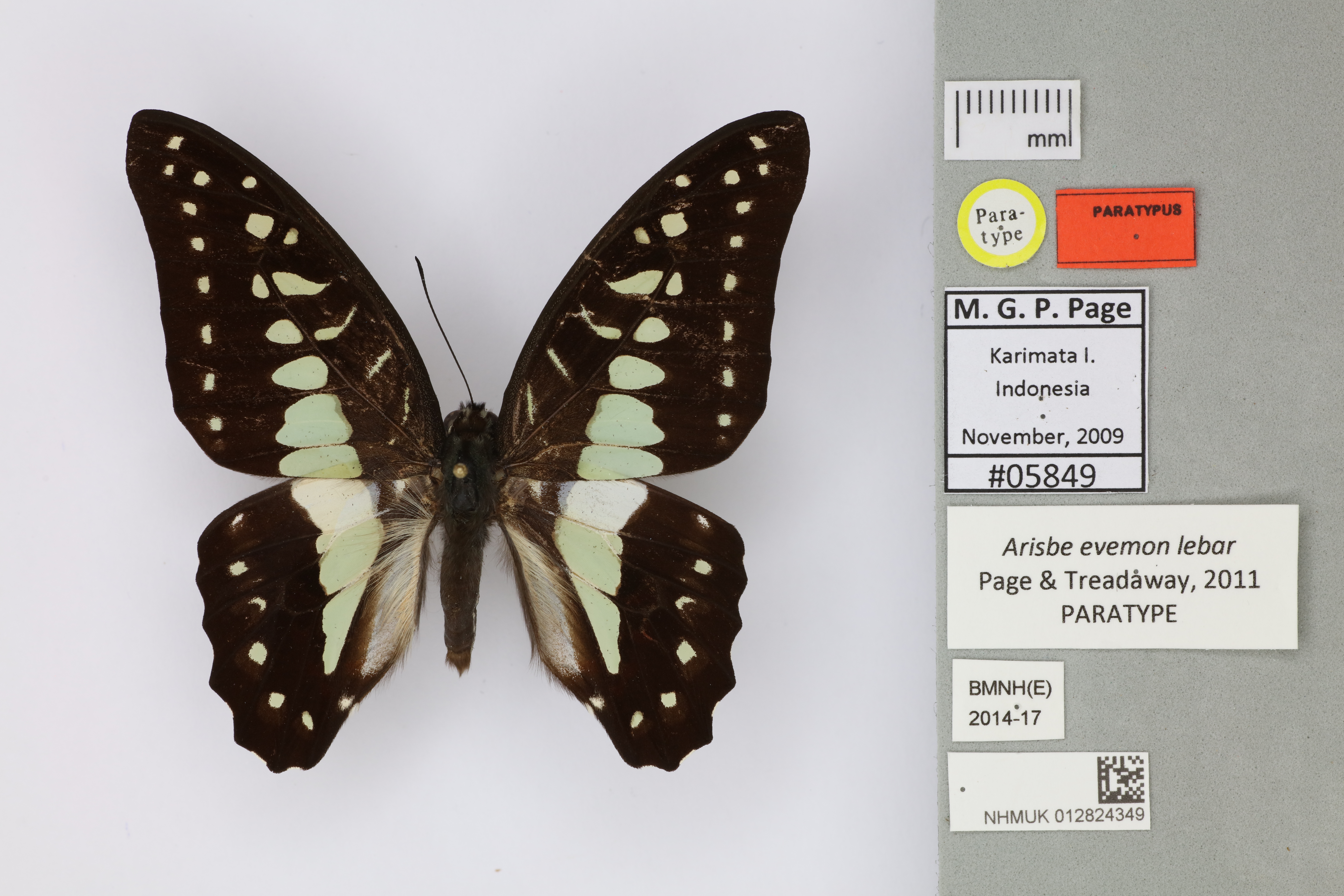
- Graphium evemon lebar

Scientific classification
- Kingdom: Animalia
- Phylum: Arthropoda
- Clade: Pancrustacea
- Class: Insecta
- Order: Lepidoptera
- Family: Papilionidae
- Genus: Graphium
- Species: G. evemon

Binomial name
- Graphium evemon Boisduval, 1836

Synonyms
- Papilio evemon Fruhstorfer, 1901; Arisbe evemon (Boisduval, 1836) Page & Treadaway, 2011

= Graphium evemon =

Blue jay

Species of butterfly

Graphium evemon, the blue jay, lesser jay, or pale green triangle is a species of tropical butterfly found in India, Indonesia, and Malaysia.

Very similar to Graphium eurypylus, but treated as a distinct species. The scent-glands of the male always forms a narrow stripe hidden in the fold, the upperside of the abdomen is also never dusted with white in large males, the last submarginal spot of the forewing above is absent or at most weakly indicated and the harpe of the male genitalia is always recognisable by the long and more basally placed ventral process; moreover, in Malayan specimens the red costal spot on the under surface of the hindwing is always absent. The female is similar to the male. Karl Jordan in Seitz ( pages 97, 98) provides a description differentiating evemon from nearby taxa and delineates the then known subspecies.

Images of evemon and similar species

== Subspecies ==
- G. e. evemon (Boisduval, 1836) – Indonesia (Java)
- G. e. eventus (Fruhstorfer, 1908) – Myanmar, Thailand, Malaysia (Peninsular Malaya, Langkawi), Indonesia (Sumatra, Banka, Borneo)
- G. e. hetaerias (Jordan, 1937) – Indonesia (Siberut)
- G. e. igneolus (Fruhstorfer, 1901) – Indonesia (Nias)
- G. e. lebar (Page & Treadaway 2011) – Indonesia (Karimati Island)
- G. e. orithia (Jordan, 1909) – Philippines (Mapun)

Note for Graphium evemon albociliatus (or var albociliatis) (Fruhstorfer, 1901) – See Graphium albociliatus, originally North Vietnam.

== See also ==
- Papilionidae
- List of butterflies of India
- List of butterflies of India (Papilionidae)
