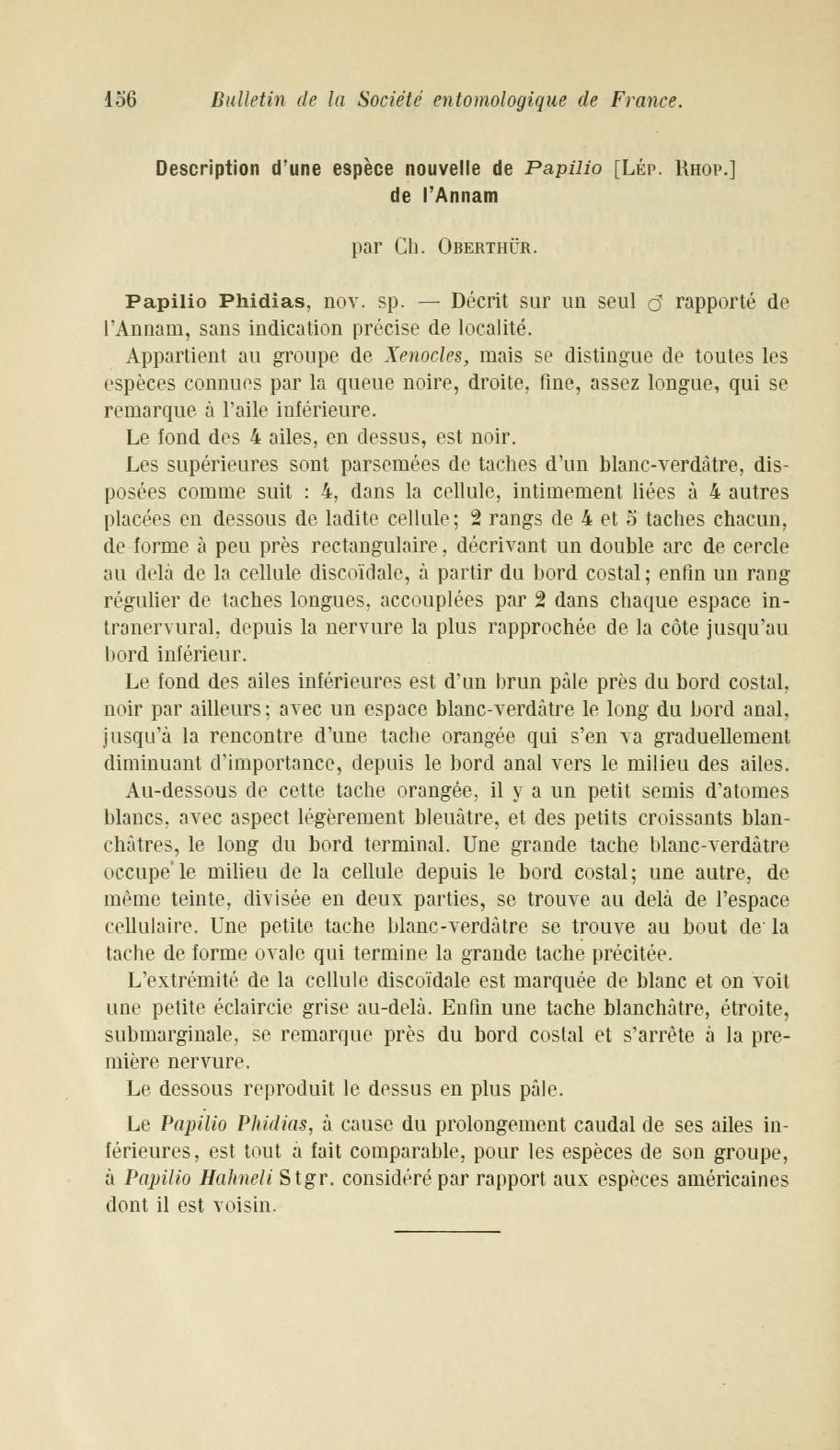

Scientific classification
- Kingdom: Animalia
- Phylum: Arthropoda
- Class: Insecta
- Order: Lepidoptera
- Family: Papilionidae
- Genus: Graphium
- Species: G. phidias

Binomial name
- Graphium phidias (Oberthür, 1906)

Synonyms
- Papilio phidias Oberthür, 1906; Graphium phidias akikoae Morita & Shinkai, 1996

= Graphium phidias =

Species of butterfly

Graphium phidias is a species of butterfly in the family Papilionidae (swallowtails). It is found in Laos and Vietnam. Jordan describes it - P. phidias Oberth.Tailed. One of the most interesting butterfly discoveries of recent times, the species being a precursor of the tailless mimetic forms. Wings black with the following white marks: on the forewing five cell-bands placed almost perpendicularly to the hindmargin of the cell, below the cell a broad band divided into longitudinal patches by the black veins, which is continued costad from the 3rd radial by two rows of small spots; between this band and the distal margin a row of linear longitudinal spots, two in each marginal cell: hindwing from the base to the apex of the cell white, with black stripes as in Graphium eurous, distal part of the wing brown-black with small light submarginal spots, double yellow anal spot and before this some small yellow spots; tail narrow, about as long as the distance from the apex of the cell to the distal margin. — Annam. Three males in coll. Oberthur

== Status ==
It is recorded from only a small area and very little information is available about it.
