= Graphium alebion =

- Graphium alebion and related species

Scientific classification
- Kingdom: Animalia
- Phylum: Arthropoda
- Clade: Pancrustacea
- Class: Insecta
- Order: Lepidoptera
- Family: Papilionidae
- Genus: Graphium
- Species: G. alebion

Binomial name
- Graphium alebion (Gray, 1853)

Synonyms
- Papilio alebion Gray, [1853]; Papilio mariesi Butler, 1881

Species of butterfly

Graphium alebion is a butterfly found in China that belongs to the swallowtail family.

== Description ==
This insect is similar to Iphiclides podalirius, but the cell of the forewing is traversed by one more band, and the band situated on the cross-veins is not continued to the hind angle as in I. podalirius. On the hindwing the black portion of the anal ocellus is reduced to a minute line, while the yellow colour forms a large spot.

== Subspecies ==
- G. a. alebion (Gray, 1853)
- G. a. chungiyanus Murayama Taiwan
