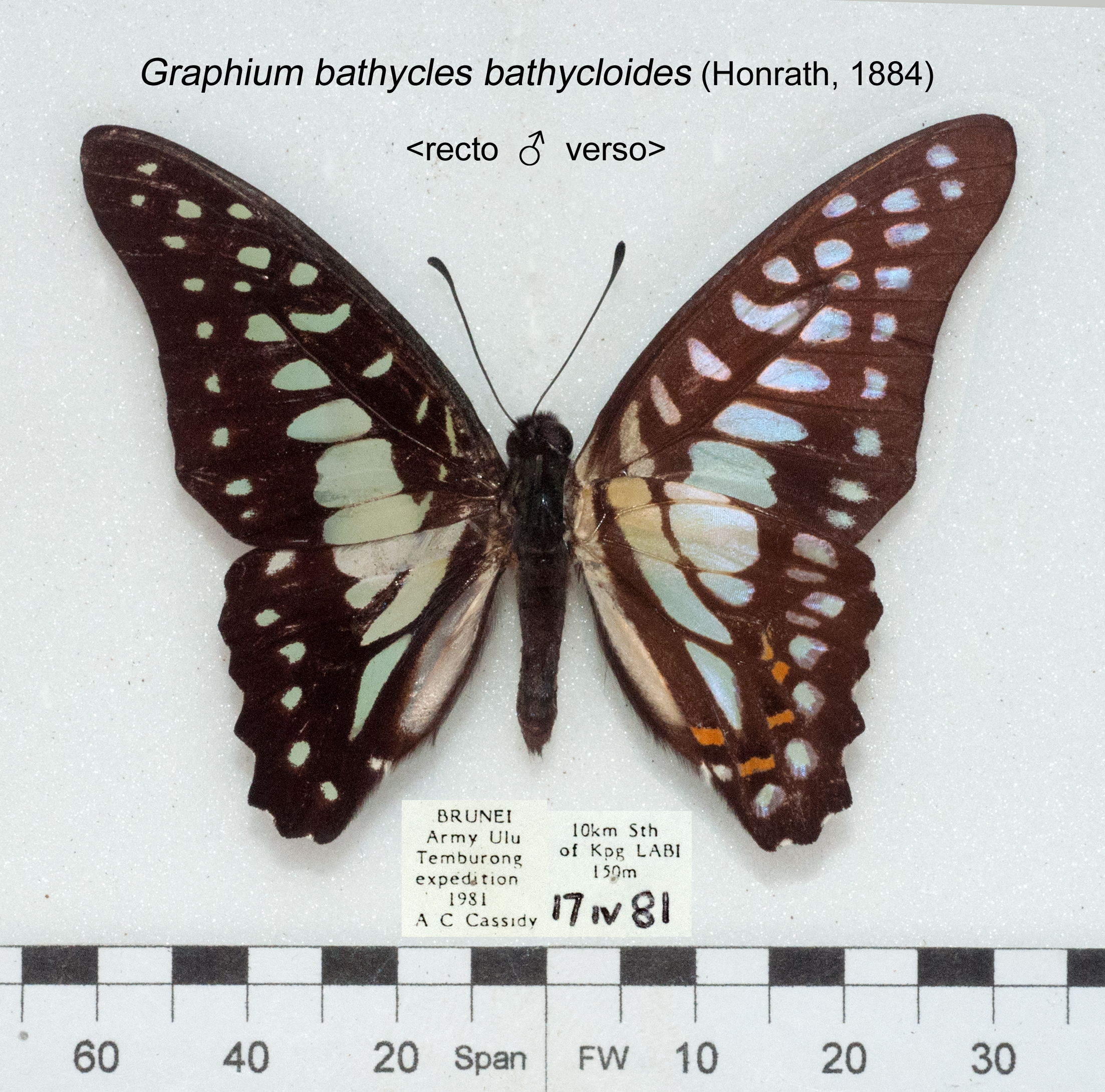
- G. b. bathycloides, Brunei

Scientific classification
- Kingdom: Animalia
- Phylum: Arthropoda
- Clade: Pancrustacea
- Class: Insecta
- Order: Lepidoptera
- Family: Papilionidae
- Genus: Graphium
- Species: G. bathycles

Binomial name
- Graphium bathycles (Zincken, 1831)

Synonyms
- Papilio bathycles Zinken, 1831; Papilio bathycles var. bathycloides Honrath, 1884

= Graphium bathycles =

Veined jay

Species of butterfly

Graphium bathycles, the veined jay, is a butterfly in the family Papilionidae, that is found in the Indomalayan realm.

Karl Jordan in Seitz ( pages 99, 100) provides a description differentiating bathycles from nearby taxa. The first part reads body above black, with ash-grey hairs at the sides of the head and thorax, beneath grey white, abdomen laterally with a grey-white stripe. Upper surface of the wings black, with pale green markings: on the forewing 5 spots in the cell, a posteriorly much widened discal band, a row of submarginal spots, and a single spot in the subcostal fork at the proximal side of the submarginal spot; on the hindwing 2 large white costal patches, an oblong spot between subcostal and cell, a long spot in the cell and one between the two median veins, often a streak below the cell, a discal spot (often absent) before the 1st median, and a row of submarginal spots. Beneath the spots silver-white, at the base of the hindwing often yellowish, the cell-spots of the forewing and the submarginal spots of the hindwing larger than above, on the hindwing the brownish black costal margin of the cell is prolonged to the costal margin in the form of a narrow, curved band, inside this band before the costal mostly a yellow spot, in addition a row of yellow spots on the disc from the apex of the cell to the anal angle. No yellowish wool in the scent-fold of the g. The female similar to the male.

== Subspecies ==
- Graphium bathycles bathycles (nominate: Java; undifferentiated: China, Sikkim to Assam, Burma)
- Graphium bathycles bathycloides (Honrath, 1884) (southern Thailand, Peninsular Malaya, Sumatra, Borneo, Philippines: Palawan, Balabac, Busuanga)

== Sources ==
- Collins, N. Mark; Morris, Michael G. (1985). Threatened Swallowtail Butterflies of the World: The IUCN Red Data Book. Gland & Cambridge: IUCN. ISBN 978-2-88032-603-6 – via Biodiversity Heritage Library.
- Page, M.G.P & Treadaway, C.G. 2003 Schmetterlinge der Erde, Butterflies of the world Part XVII (17), Papilionidae IX Papilionidae of the Philippine Islands. Edited by Erich Bauer and Thomas Frankenbach Keltern: Goecke & Evers; Canterbury: Hillside Books. ISBN 978-3-931374-45-7
- Tsukada, E. & Nishiyama, Y. 1982. Papilionidae. In: Tsukada, E. (ed): Butterflies of the South East Asian Islands. Volume 1. Plapac Co., Tokyo
