= Graphium decolor =

Scientific classification
- Kingdom: Animalia
- Phylum: Arthropoda
- Clade: Pancrustacea
- Class: Insecta
- Order: Lepidoptera
- Family: Papilionidae
- Genus: Graphium
- Species: G. decolor

Binomial name
- Graphium decolor (Staudinger, 1888)

Synonyms
- Papilio antiphates var. decolor Staudinger, 1888; Papilio antiphates palawanicus Eimer, 1889; Papilio antiphates euphrates ab. loc. atratus Rothschild, 1895; Papilio antiphates f. tigris Semper, 1892; Arisbe decolor rebeccae Page & Treadaway, 2003; Arisbe decolor jamesi Page & Treadaway, 2003

Species of butterfly

Graphium decolor is a butterfly found in the Philippines and Sabah, Malaysia, that belongs to the swallowtail family.

== Subspecies ==
- G. d. decolor (Philippines: Balabac, Calamian, Palawan)
- G. d. atratus (Rothschild, 1895) (Philippines: Mindoro)
- G. d. neozebraica Page, 1987 (Philippines: Bohol, Leyte, Luzon, Marinduque, Masbate, Negros, Panaon, Panay, Polillo, Samar, Siquijor, Ticao)
- G. d. sibuyana Page, 1987 (Philippines: Sibuyan)
- G. d. tigris (Semper, 1892)
- G. d. rebeccae (Page & Treadaway, 2003) (Philippines: Camiguin de Luzon)
- G. d. jamesi (Page & Treadaway, 2003) (Philippines: Sibutu, Sanga Sanga)

== Taxonomy ==
May be a subspecies of Graphium antiphates.It was described as a var. of that species.
