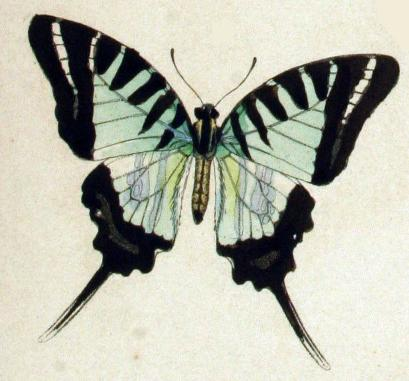

Scientific classification
- Kingdom: Animalia
- Phylum: Arthropoda
- Clade: Pancrustacea
- Class: Insecta
- Order: Lepidoptera
- Family: Papilionidae
- Genus: Graphium
- Species: G. euphrates

Binomial name
- Graphium euphrates (C. and R. Felder, 1862)

Synonyms
- Papilio euphrates C. & R. Felder, 1862; Papilio moorei Reakirt, [1865]; Pathysa euphrates euphrates; Graphium cuyoensis Medicielo & Hanafusa, 1994

= Graphium euphrates =

Species of butterfly

Graphium euphrates is a butterfly found in the Philippines and Sulawesi that belongs to the swallowtail family.

The larva feeds on Annona, Desmos and Uvaria species.

== Subspecies ==
- G. e. euphrates (Philippines: Busuanga, Cuyo, Homonhon, Leyte, Luzon, Marinduque, Mindanao, Mindoro, Samar)
- G. e. nisus Jordan (northern Luzon)
- G. e. domaranus (Fruhstorfer, 1903) (Philippines: Palawan, Dumaran, Balabac)
- G. e. ornatus (Rothschild, 1895) (Halmahera, Ternate, Bachan)
- G. e. boholensis Page, 1987 (Philippines: Bohol)
- G. e. buhisanus Page, 1987 (Philippines: Cebu)
- G. e. elegantia Tsukada & Nishiyama, 1980 (southern Sulawesi)
