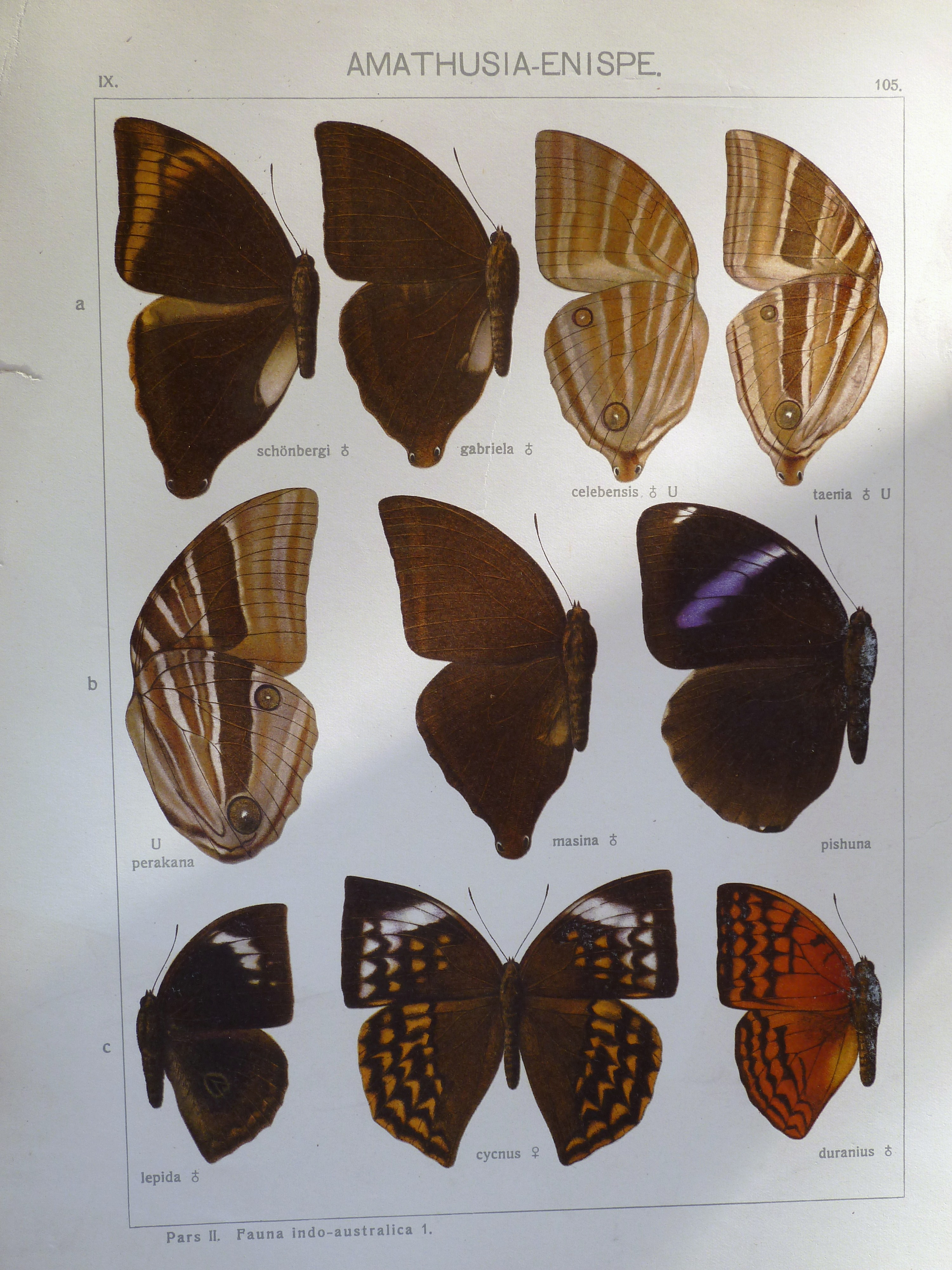

Scientific classification
- Domain: Eukaryota
- Kingdom: Animalia
- Phylum: Arthropoda
- Class: Insecta
- Order: Lepidoptera
- Family: Nymphalidae
- Genus: Amathusia
- Species: A. perakana

Binomial name
- Amathusia perakana Honrath, [1888]

= Amathusia perakana =

Species of butterfly

Amathusia perakana, the Perak Palmking, is a butterfly found in Peninsular Malaya, Sumatra, Borneo and the Natuna Islands. It belongs to the Satyrinae, a subfamily of the brush-footed butterflies.

== Description ==
Described as a variety of Amathusia phidippus from which it differs in the following minor respects. The upper hindwing lacks a concealed hair pencil (scent pencil-a dorsal glandular fold or oval shaped depression on the wing membrane covered by pencils of long hairs). The brown fringe in space 1a just crosses vein 1b. The abdominal hair pencils are buff coloured. Females closely resemble females of Amathusia phidippus. In both sexes the reddish underside median band is broad and the stripes are pale.

== Status ==
It is rare.
