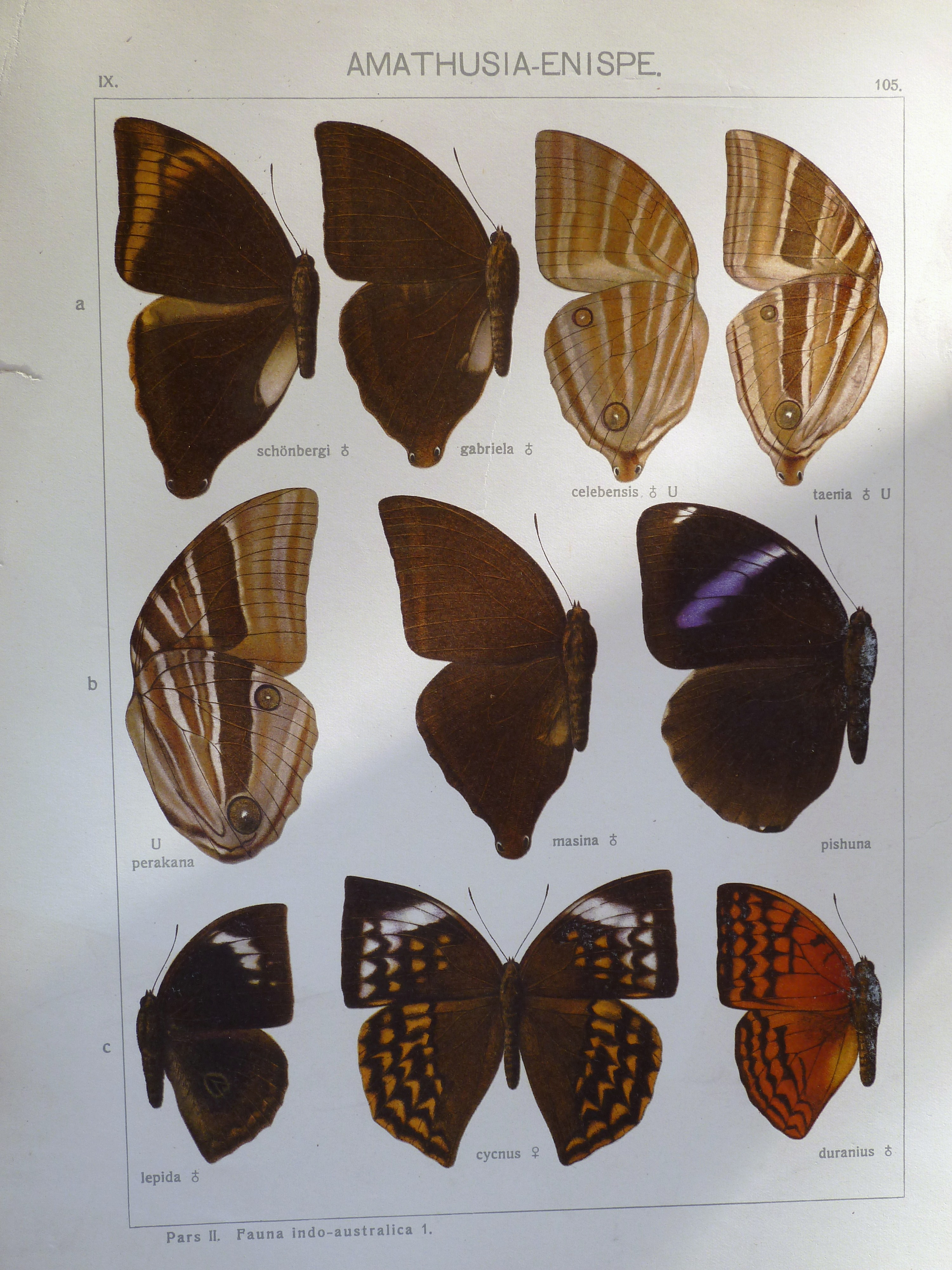
- A. o. gabriela

Scientific classification
- Domain: Eukaryota
- Kingdom: Animalia
- Phylum: Arthropoda
- Class: Insecta
- Order: Lepidoptera
- Family: Nymphalidae
- Genus: Amathusia
- Species: A. ochraceofusca

Binomial name
- Amathusia ochraceofusca Honrath, [1888]

= Amathusia ochraceofusca =

Species of butterfly

Amathusia ochraceofusca , the pale-haired palmking, is a butterfly found in the Indomalayan realm It belongs to the Satyrinae, a subfamily of the brush-footed butterflies.

== Description ==
Deep indentations at veins 2, 3 and 4 but less so than Amathusia schoenbergi Male upper hindwing has a hair pencil (scent pencil-a dorsal glandular fold or oval-shaped depression on the wing membrane covered by pencils of long hairs) .

== Subspecies ==
- A. o. ochraceofusca Sumatra, Peninsular Malaya
- A. o. gabriela Fruhstorfer, 1905 Borneo
