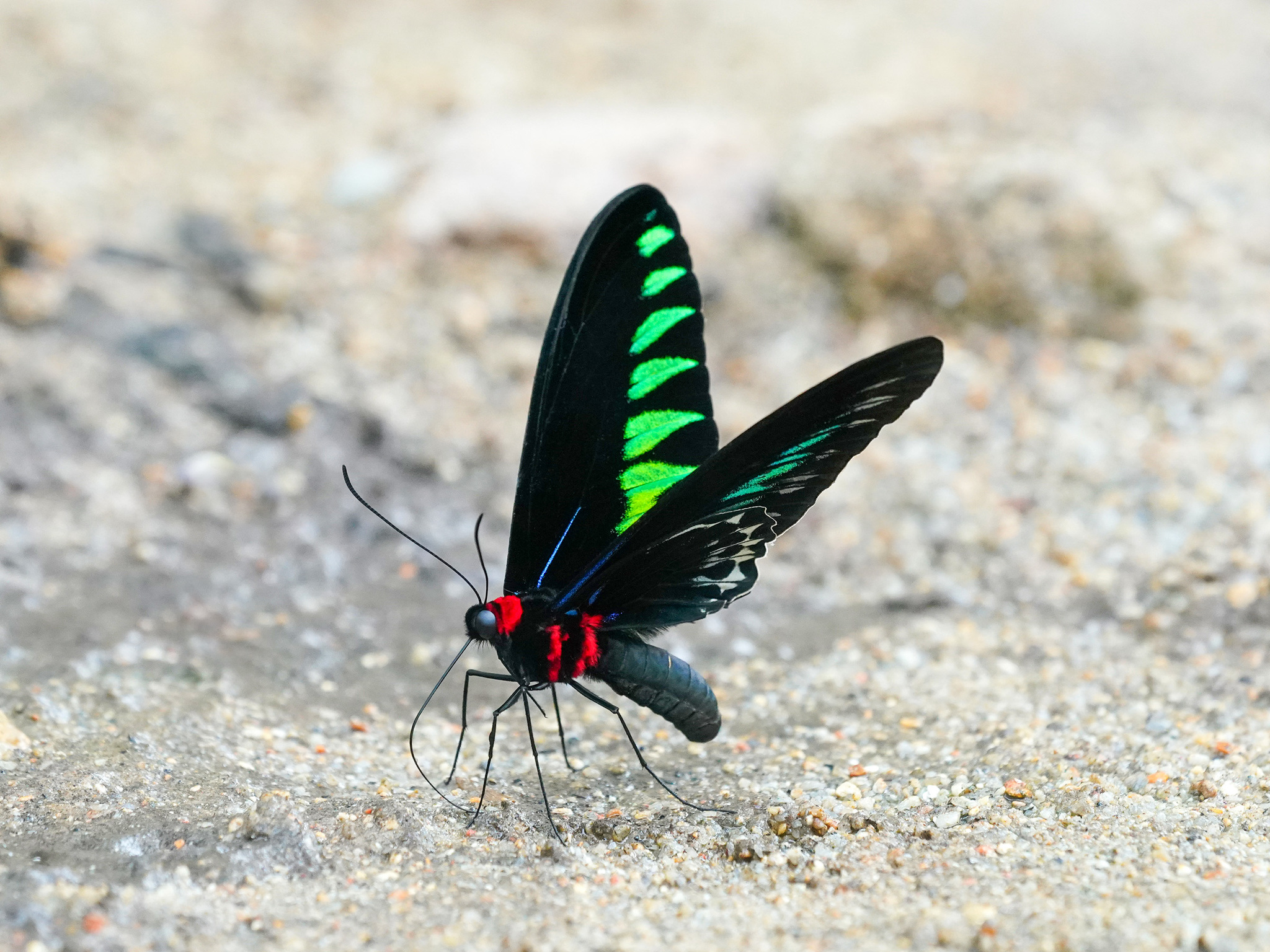
- Trogonoptera brookiana albescens
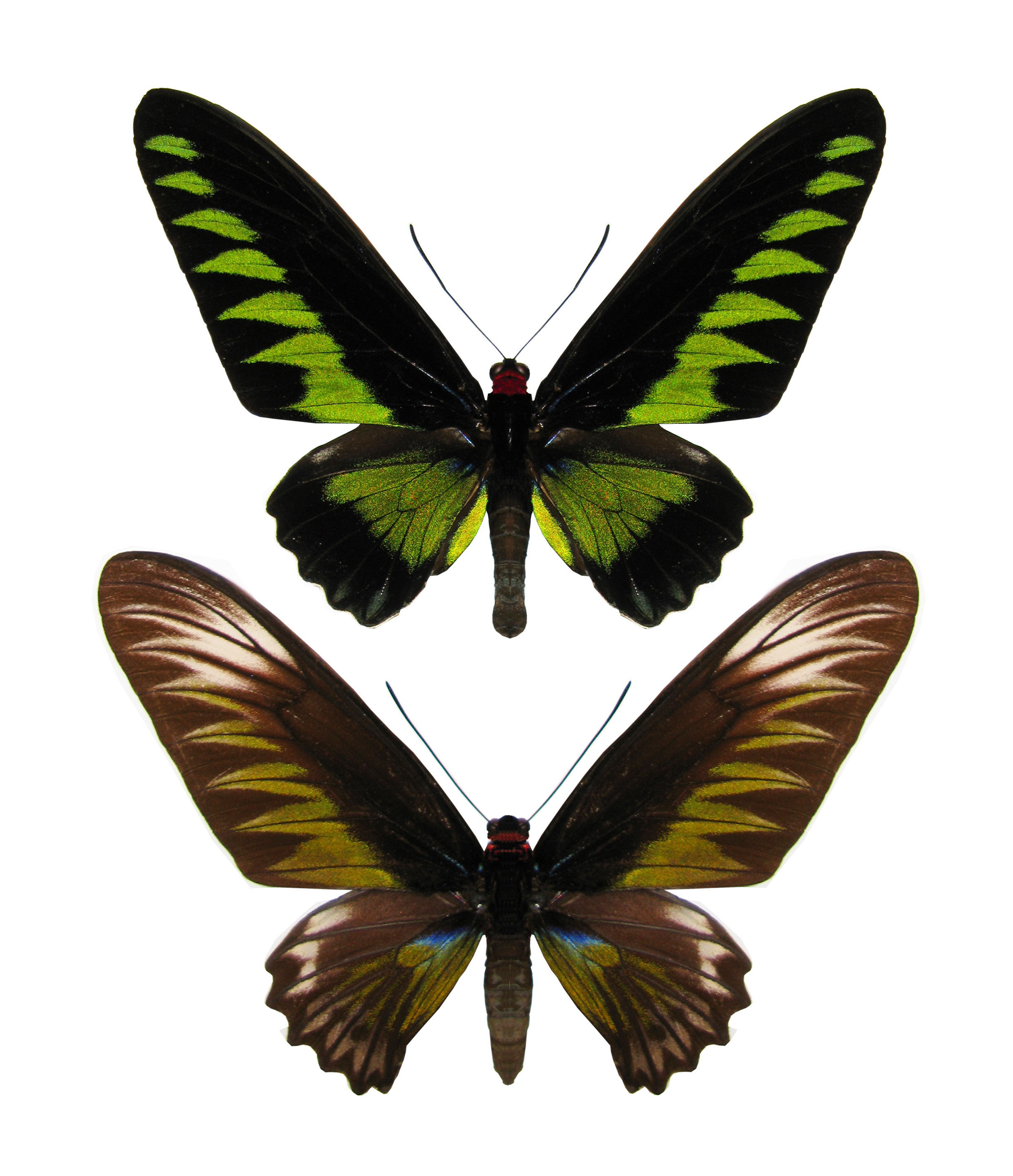
- Adult male (above) and female, dorsal surfaces

Conservation status
- Least Concern (IUCN 3.1)
- CITES Appendix II

Scientific classification
- Kingdom: Animalia
- Phylum: Arthropoda
- Clade: Pancrustacea
- Class: Insecta
- Order: Lepidoptera
- Family: Papilionidae
- Genus: Trogonoptera
- Species: T. brookiana

Binomial name
- Trogonoptera brookiana Wallace, 1855

Synonyms
- Ornithoptera brookiana Wallace, 1855; Troides brookiana

= Trogonoptera brookiana =

Rajah Brooke's birdwing

Species of butterfly

Trogonoptera brookiana, Rajah Brooke's birdwing, is a birdwing butterfly from the rainforests of the Thai-Malay Peninsula, Borneo, Natuna, Sumatra, and various small islands west of Sumatra (Banyak, Simeulue, Batu and Mentawai). The butterfly was named by the naturalist Alfred Russel Wallace in 1855, after James Brooke, the Rajah of Sarawak. The larval host plants are Aristolochia acuminata and A. foveolata. Adults sip flower nectar from plants such as Bauhinia. Rajah Brooke's birdwing is a protected species, listed under Appendix II of CITES, meaning that international export is restricted to those who have been granted a permit. It is the national butterfly of Malaysia.

== Description ==
Both sexes resemble the more restricted relative, the Palawan birdwing, but males of Rajah Brooke's birdwing have more green to the hindwings. The wingspan of Rajah Brooke's birdwing is 15–17 cm (5.9–6.7 in). The wings of males are mainly black. Each forewing has seven tooth-shaped electric-green markings, while there is a relatively large electric-green patch on the hindwings. The head is bright red and the body is black with red markings. The wings of females are browner with prominent white flashes at the tips of the forewings and at the base of the hindwings.

== Taxonomy ==
Genus: Trogonoptera Rippon, 1890

Species: Trogonoptera brookiana Wallace, 1855

Subspecies: Trogonoptera brookiana brookiana (Wallace, 1855)

Form: Trogonoptera brookiana brookiana f. brookiana Wallace, 1855
Form: Trogonoptera brookiana brookiana f. julijae S.Hu, 2007

Subspecies: Trogonoptera brookiana toshikii Kobayashi, 1991
Subspecies: Trogonoptera brookiana akikoa Morita, 1994

Species: Trogonoptera trojana Honrath, 1886

== Illustrations ==
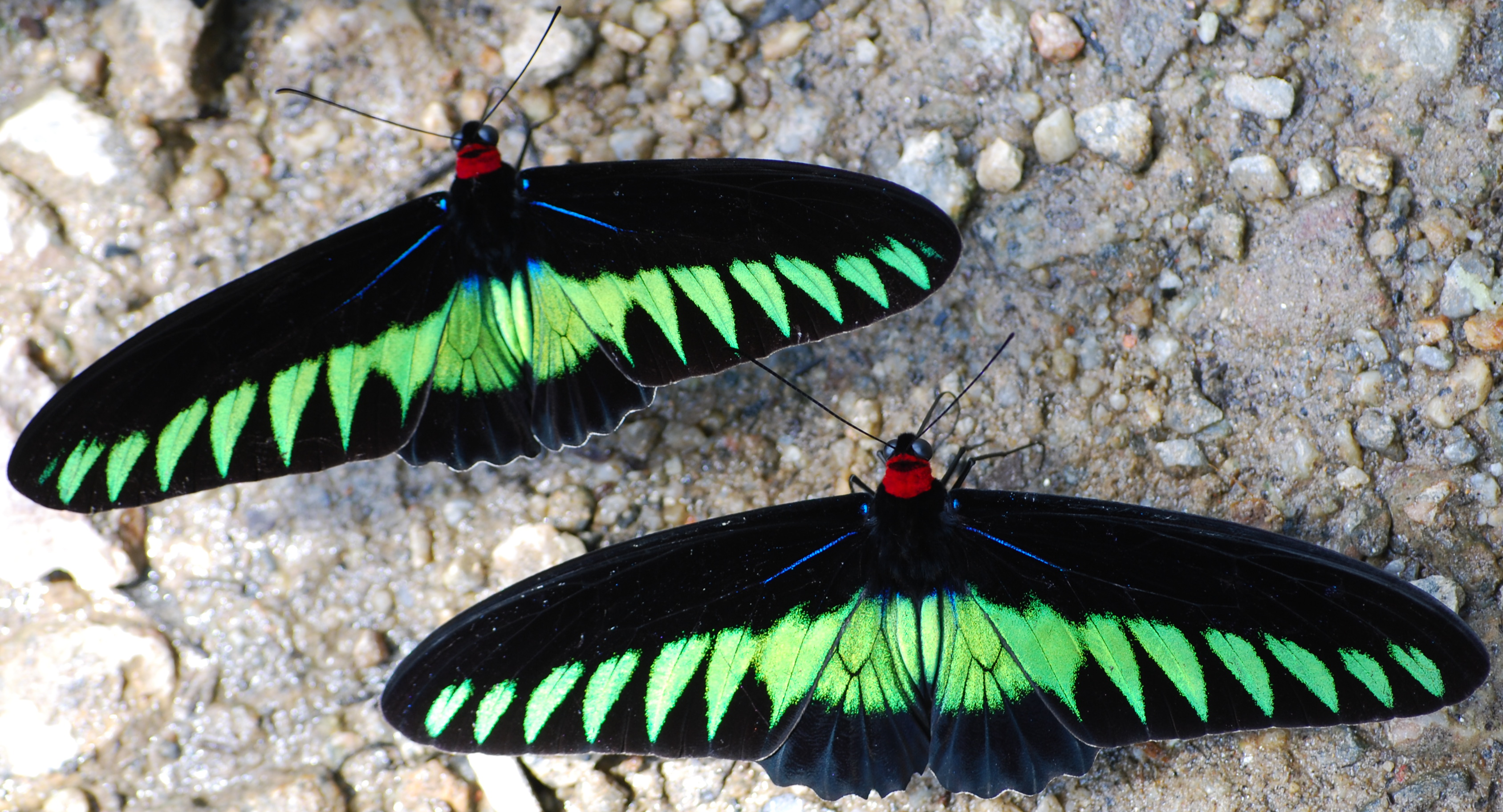
Two males at Kuala Woh

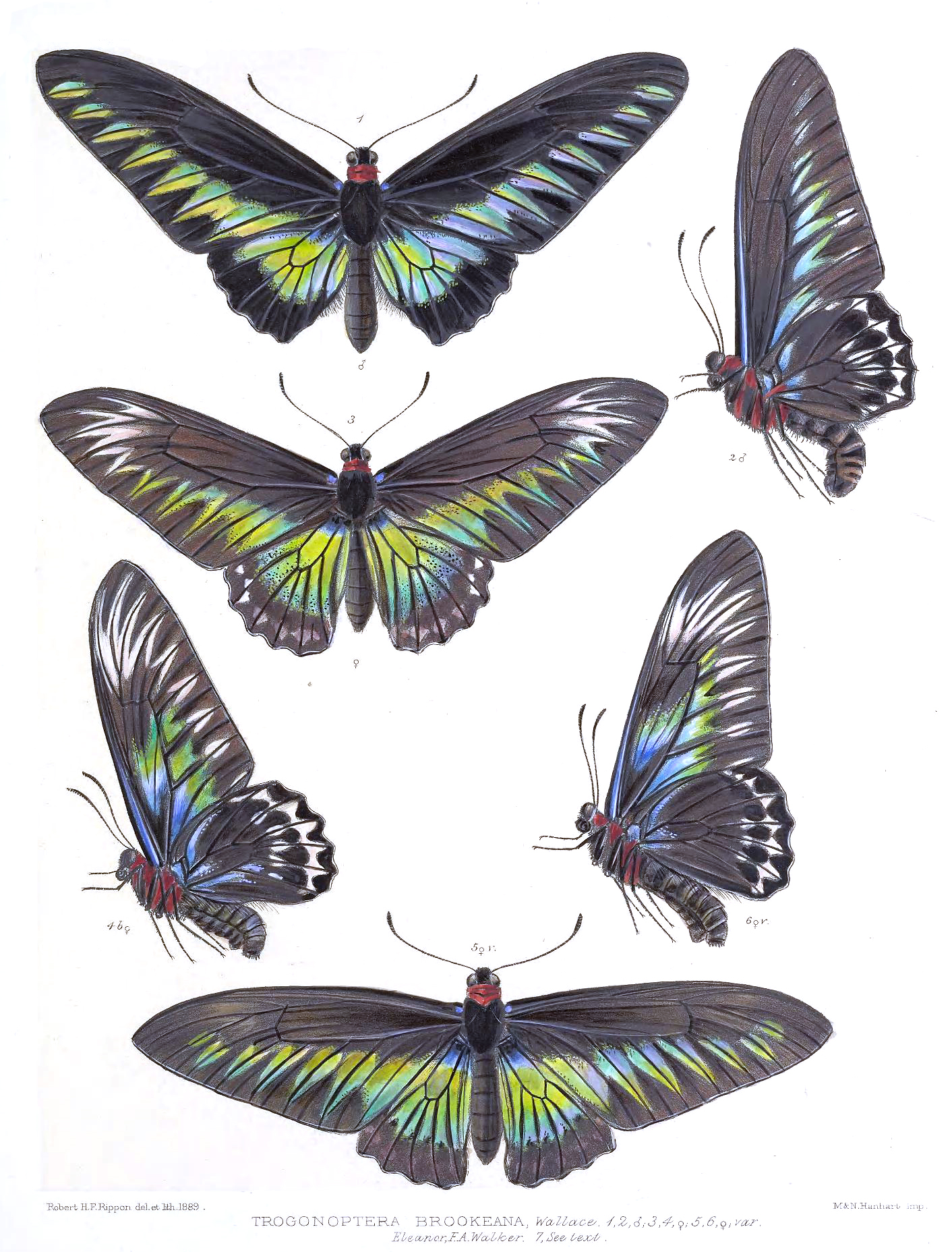
Males from Icones Ornithopterorum volume 2

Male (bottom)
