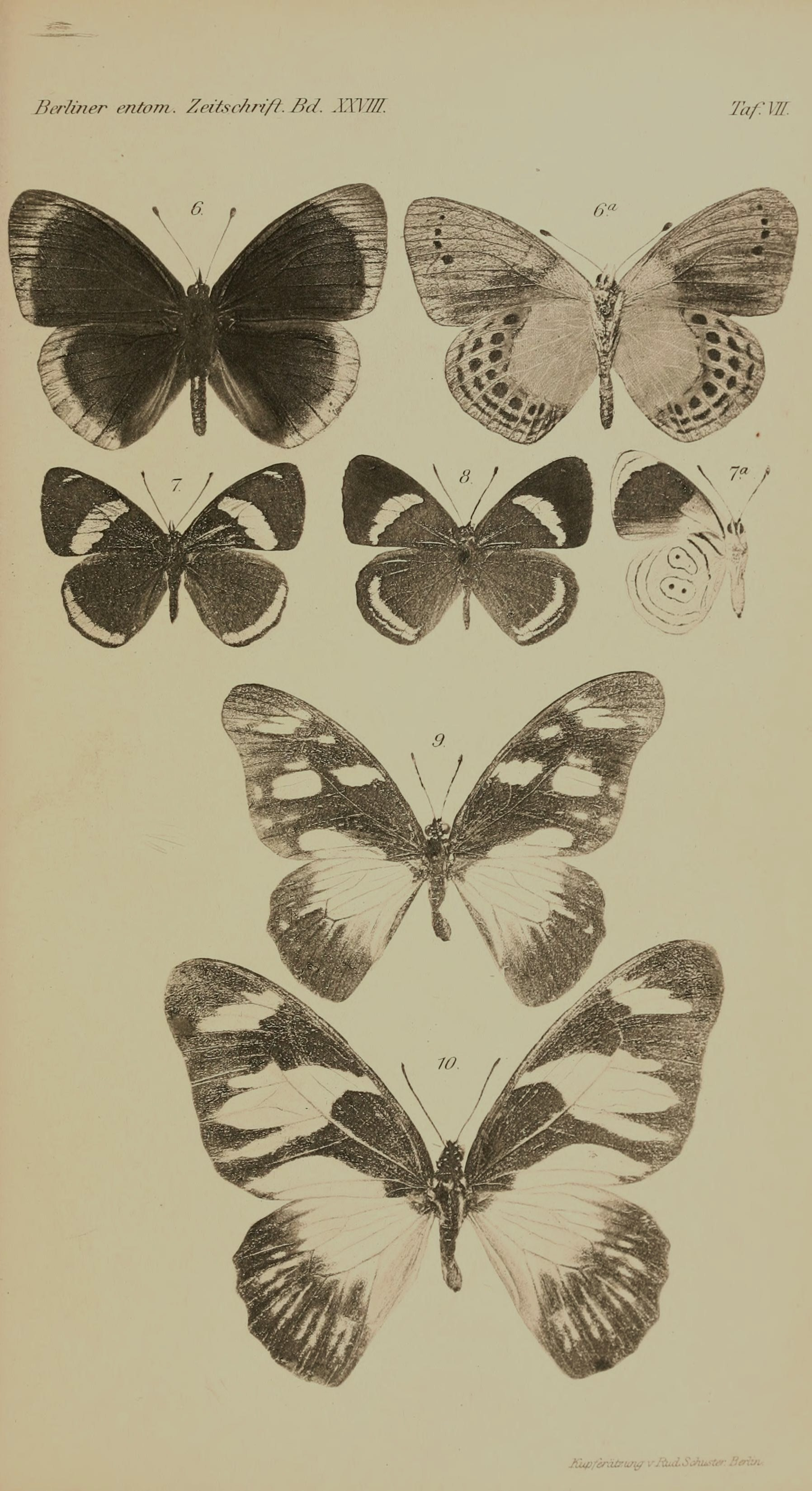
- Figure 10 Honrath's image of the type

Scientific classification
- Kingdom: Animalia
- Phylum: Arthropoda
- Clade: Pancrustacea
- Class: Insecta
- Order: Lepidoptera
- Family: Papilionidae
- Genus: Graphium
- Species: G. poggianus

Binomial name
- Graphium poggianus (Honrath, 1884)

Synonyms
- Papilio poggianus Honrath, 1884; Graphium (Arisbe) poggianus

= Graphium poggianus =

Species of butterfly

Graphium poggianus is a butterfly in the family Papilionidae. It is found in northern Angola, the southern part of the Democratic Republic of the Congo and north-western Zambia.

== Description ==
This species is larger than related species, with a forewing length of about 48 mm. The markings are whitish; the forewing lacks submarginal spots and bears a large transverse spot in the cell opposite to cellule 3, which reaches the front margin of the cell and is united with three long discal spots in cellules 2-—4; the discal spot in cellule 2 is very long, almost reaching the margin, but narrow, so that it only covers the anterior part of the cellule. The discal spots in cellules 1 a and 1 b consequently form a free hindmarginal spot, which almost reaches the margin, but is rather far removed from the base. The discal spots in cellules 6 and 8 are arranged almost exactly as in the other species. The transverse band of the hindwing is broad, almost reaching the base and the apex of the cell. A broad dark submarginal band is present in each of cellules 2-5, with two long whitish, somewhat irregular streaks.

== Taxonomy ==
Graphium poggianus belongs to a species group with 16 members. All are very similar. It is given as a form of Graphium almansor by Berger. The species group members are:

- Graphium abri Smith & Vane-Wright, 2001
- Graphium adamastor (Boisduval, 1836)
- Graphium agamedes (Westwood, 1842)
- Graphium almansor (Honrath, 1884)
- Graphium auriger (Butler, 1876)
- Graphium aurivilliusi (Seeldrayers, 1896)
- Graphium fulleri (Grose-Smith, 1883)
- Graphium hachei (Dewitz, 1881)
- Graphium kigoma Carcasson, 1964
- Graphium olbrechtsi Berger, 1950
- Graphium poggianus (Honrath, 1884)
- Graphium rileyi Berger, 1950
- Graphium schubotzi (Schultze, 1913)
- Graphium simoni (Aurivillius, 1899),
- Graphium ucalegon (Hewitson, 1865)[
- Graphium ucalegonides (Staudinger, 1884)

== Images ==
External images from Royal Museum of Central Africa.
