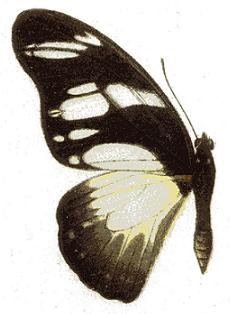

Scientific classification
- Kingdom: Animalia
- Phylum: Arthropoda
- Clade: Pancrustacea
- Class: Insecta
- Order: Lepidoptera
- Family: Papilionidae
- Genus: Graphium
- Species: G. almansor

Binomial name
- Graphium almansor (Honrath, 1884)

Synonyms
- Papilio almansor Honrath, 1884; Graphium (Arisbe) almansor; Graphium almansor almansor f. albescens Berger, 1950; Graphium almansor almansor f. depuncta Berger, 1950; Papilio charcedonius birbiri Ungemach, 1932; Papilio charchedonius Karsch, 1895; Papilio escherichi Gaede, 1915; Graphium almansor snowi Gabriel, 1945; Papilio uganda Lathy, 1906; Papilio graueri Grünberg, 1908

= Graphium almansor =

Species of butterfly

Graphium almansor, the Almansor white-lady swordtail or Honrath's white lady, is a butterfly in the family Papilionidae (swallowtails). It is found in Guinea, Ghana, Togo, Nigeria, Cameroon, the Republic of the Congo, Angola, the Central African Republic, the Democratic Republic of the Congo, Sudan, Ethiopia, Uganda, Kenya, Tanzania, Zambia and possibly Rwanda and Burundi.

== Description ==
Markings white; median band of the forewing also broadly interrupted in cellule 2, as the discal spot of this cellule is absent or very small; the transverse spot of the cell of the forewing reaches the front margin of the cell, but is rather broadly separated from the discal spot in cellule 3; hind¬wing without discal dots and with indistinct or partly absent submarginal dots, the apex of the cell filled in with white; the cell of the forewing with a white apical spot; the discal spot in cellule 1 b of the fore¬wing does not reach so far basad as the spot in 1 a and is therefore shorter. —- Ashanti and Angola. G. carchedonius Karsch only differs from almansor in that the discal spots in 1 a and 1 b of the forewing are both obliquely rounded off proximally and the cell of the forewing has no apical spot. — Togo and Congo region.[In subspecies] G. uganda the white markings of the fore¬ wing are much reduced, consisting only of three short streaks in the middle of the cell, small discal spots in 1 a, 1 b and 3, two streaks in cellule 6, a broken discal spot in 8 and submarginal dots in 1 b, 2, 3 and 6; the discal spot in 1 a is placed much nearer to the base than that in lb; the transverse band of the hind¬ wing is somewhat yellowish, covers the apex of the cell and is incised in cellules 2 and 6, but without discal spots.Uganda.

== Biology ==
Adults of both sexes mimic Amauris species, including Amauris damocles and species of the Amauris echeria-group. Males are attracted to damp spots on river banks (mud-puddling) and both sexes feed from flowers.

The larvae feed on Pseudospondias microcarpa.

== Subspecies ==
- Graphium almansor almansor (Angola, Democratic Republic of the Congo, northern Zambia)
- Graphium almansor birbiri (Ungemach, 1932) (south-western Ethiopia)
- Graphium almansor carchedonius (Karsch, 1895) (Guinea, Ghana, Togo)
- Graphium almansor escherichi (Gaede, 1915) (eastern Nigeria, Cameroon, Congo, Central African Republic, Democratic Republic of the Congo, southern Sudan, Uganda)
- Graphium almansor uganda (Lathy, 1906) (Democratic Republic of the Congo, Uganda, south-western Kenya, north-western Tanzania, Rwanda, Burundi)

Torben Larsen developed a species numbering system for his 2005 publication Butterflies of West Africa. The subspecies carchedonius is #24. The 'Larsen' numbers have since been used with permission in A Sharp Eye on Butterflies of Ghana.

== Taxonomy ==
Graphium almansor belongs to a species group with 16 members. All are very similar The species group members are:

- Graphium abri Smith & Vane-Wright, 2001
- Graphium adamastor (Boisduval, 1836)
- Graphium agamedes (Westwood, 1842)
- Graphium almansor (Honrath, 1884)
- Graphium auriger (Butler, 1876)
- Graphium aurivilliusi (Seeldrayers, 1896)
- Graphium fulleri (Grose-Smith, 1883)
- Graphium hachei (Dewitz, 1881)
- Graphium kigoma Carcasson, 1964
- Graphium olbrechtsi Berger, 1950
- Graphium poggianus (Honrath, 1884)
- Graphium rileyi Berger, 1950
- Graphium schubotzi (Schultze, 1913)
- Graphium simoni (Aurivillius, 1899),
- Graphium ucalegon (Hewitson, 1865)[
- Graphium ucalegonides (Staudinger, 1884)

== Images ==
- External images from Royal Museum of Central Africa
