= Amathusia andamanensis =

Andaman palmking

Scientific classification
- Domain: Eukaryota
- Kingdom: Animalia
- Phylum: Arthropoda
- Class: Insecta
- Order: Lepidoptera
- Family: Nymphalidae
- Genus: Amathusia
- Species: A. andamanensis

Binomial name
- Amathusia andamanensis Frühstorfer, 1899

Species of butterfly

Amathusia andamanensis, the Andaman palmking, is an endemic butterfly found in India that belongs to the Morphinae subfamily of the brush-footed butterflies family.

The Andaman palmking was earlier considered as a subspecies of the palmking (Amathusia phidippus andamanica, Frühstorfer).

== Distribution ==
The Andaman palmking is found in the Andaman Islands of India.

== Status ==
In 1932, William Harry Evans reported the butterfly as rare.

== See also ==
- List of butterflies of India
- List of butterflies of India (Morphinae)
- List of butterflies of India (Nymphalidae)
