= Amathusia binghami =

Scientific classification
- Domain: Eukaryota
- Kingdom: Animalia
- Phylum: Arthropoda
- Class: Insecta
- Order: Lepidoptera
- Family: Nymphalidae
- Genus: Amathusia
- Species: A. binghami

Binomial name
- Amathusia binghami Fruhstorfer, 1904

Species of butterfly

Amathusia binghami is a butterfly found in Peninsular Malaya and Sumatra It belongs to the Satyrinae, a subfamily of the brush-footed butterflies.

== Description ==
Described as a variety of Amathusia phidippus from which it differs in the following minor respects. The upper hindwing has a concealed hair pencil (scent pencil-a dorsal glandular fold or oval shaped depression on the wing membrane covered by pencils of long hairs) in space 1b and a large buff hair pencil in 1b. The underside median band is reddish.
