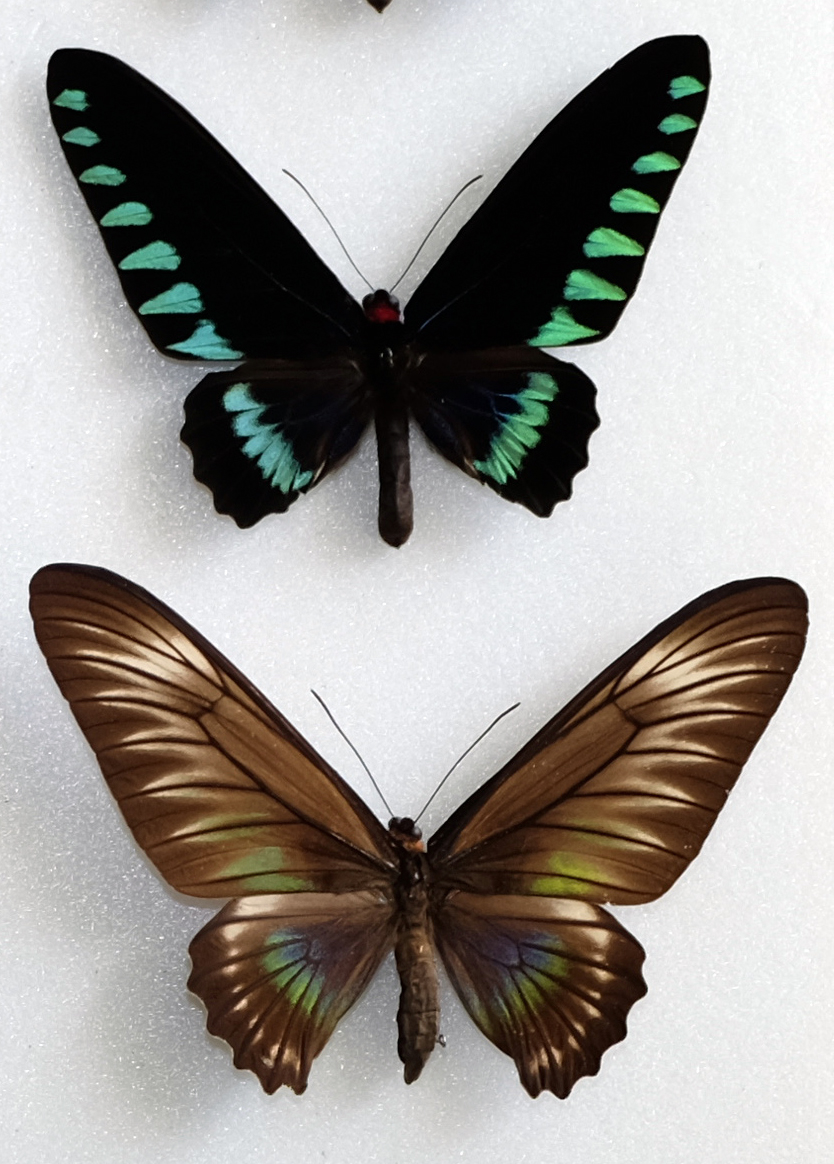
- Adult male (top) and female (bottom) dorsal surface

Conservation status
- Near Threatened (IUCN 3.1)
- CITES Appendix II

Scientific classification
- Kingdom: Animalia
- Phylum: Arthropoda
- Class: Insecta
- Order: Lepidoptera
- Family: Papilionidae
- Genus: Trogonoptera
- Species: T. trojana

Binomial name
- Trogonoptera trojana (Staudinger, 1889)
- The Palawan birdwing is endemic to Palawan in the Philippines.

Synonyms
- Troides trojana

= Trogonoptera trojana =

Palawan birdwing

Species of butterfly

Trogonoptera trojana, the Palawan birdwing or triangle birdwing, is a birdwing butterfly of the family Papilionidae. It is endemic to Palawan in the Philippines. It is one of only two species in its genus, the other being the more widespread Rajah Brooke's birdwing, where the male has larger green markings on the hindwings. This species is included in CITES Appendix II, restricting international export to those who have been granted a permit. The wingspan is approximately 18–19 cm (7.1–7.5 in). The species may be observed flying at any point during the year. The larvae feed on Aristolochia.

== Taxonomy ==
Genus: Trogonoptera Rippon, 1890

Species: Trogonoptera brookiana Wallace, 1855

Subspecies: Trogonoptera brookiana brookiana (Wallace, 1855)

Form: Trogonoptera brookiana brookiana f. brookiana Wallace, 1855
Form: Trogonoptera brookiana brookiana f. julijae S.Hu, 2007

Subspecies: Trogonoptera brookiana toshikii Kobayashi, 1991
Subspecies: Trogonoptera brookiana akikoa Morita, 1994

Species: Trogonoptera trojana Honrath, 1886

== Illustrations ==
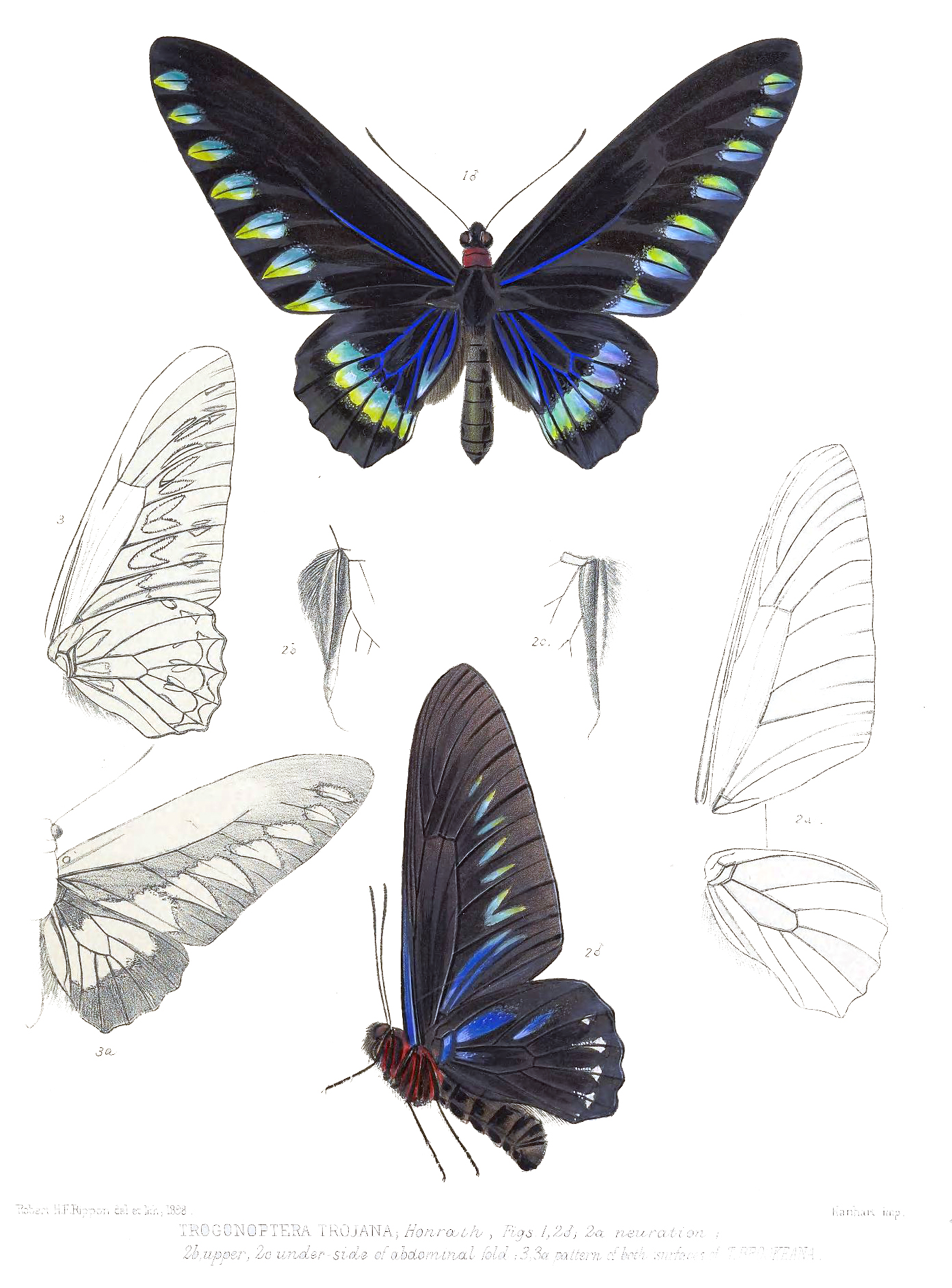
Males from Icones Ornithopterorum volume 2

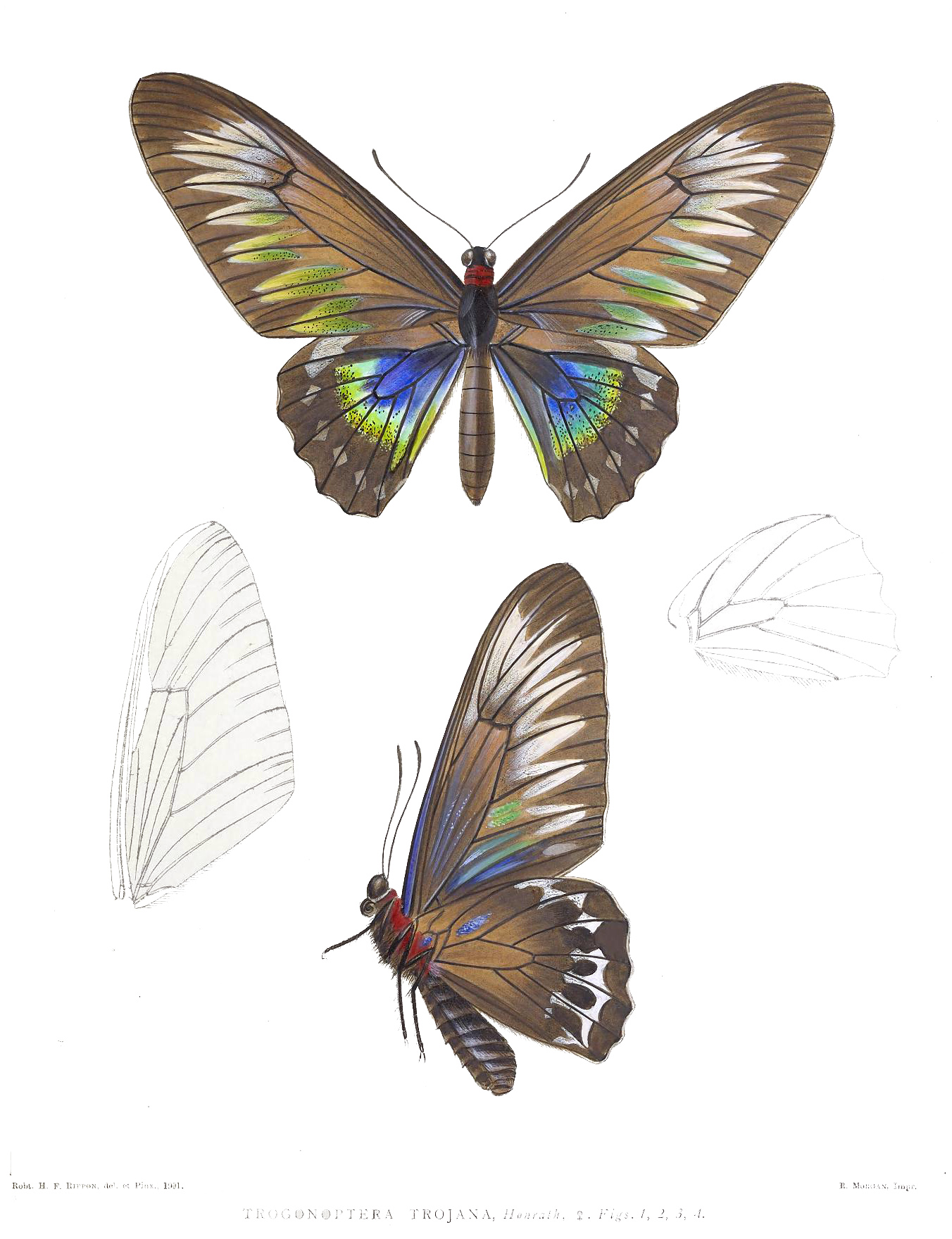
Females from Icones Ornithopterorum volume 2
