= Friderici =

Friderici is a surname. Notable people with the name include:

- Blanche Friderici (1878–1933), American film and stage actress
- Christian Ernst Friderici (1709–1780), German builder of keyboard instruments
- Daniel Friderici (1584–1638), German cantor, conductor, and composer
- Erich Friderici (1885–1967), German general during World War II
- Jurriaan de Friderici (1751–1812), Dutch military officer and plantation owner

== See also ==
- Amathusia friderici, butterfly found in the Indomalayan realm
