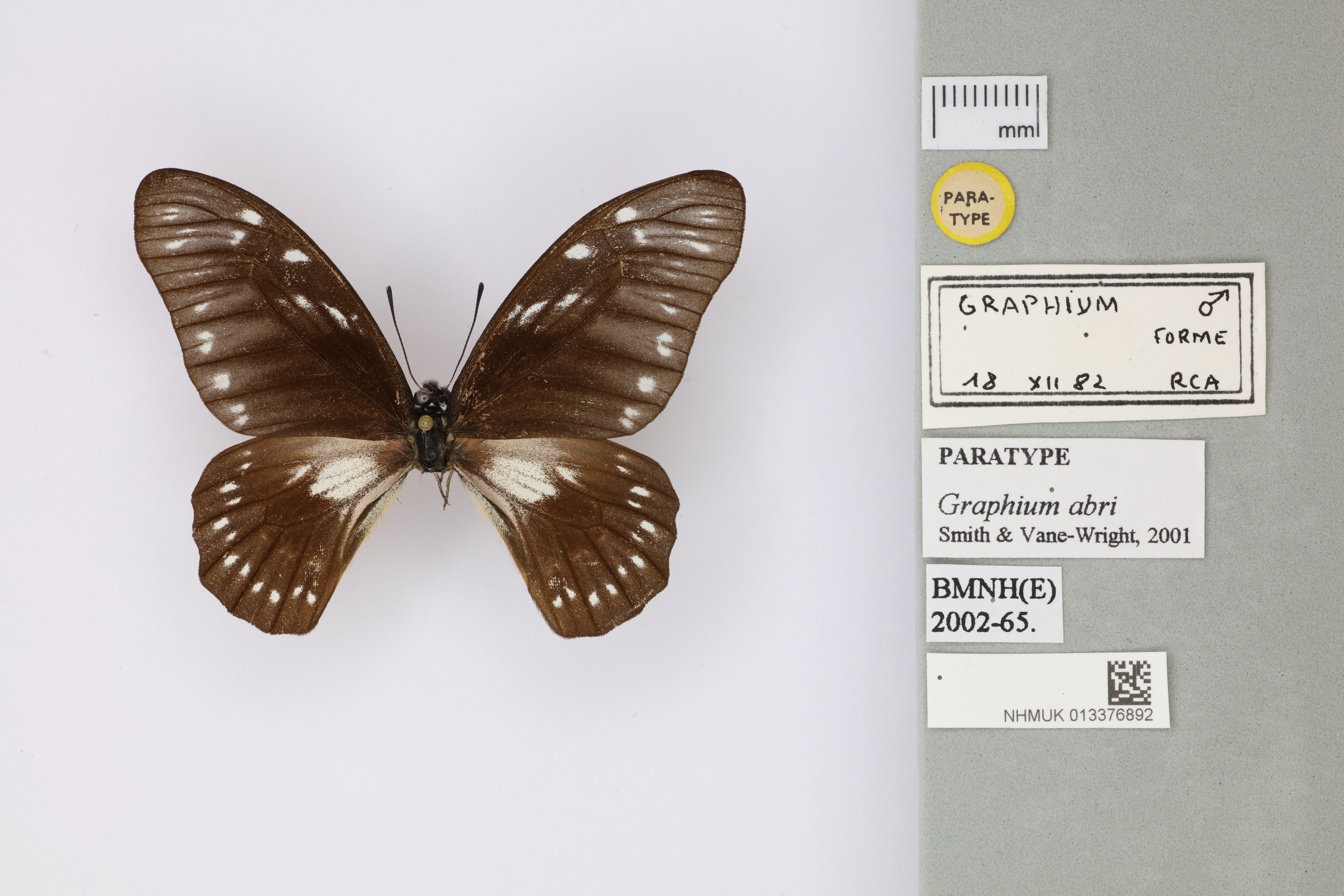
- Graphium abri dorsum male. Paratype.

Scientific classification
- Kingdom: Animalia
- Phylum: Arthropoda
- Clade: Pancrustacea
- Class: Insecta
- Order: Lepidoptera
- Family: Papilionidae
- Genus: Graphium
- Species: G. abri

Binomial name
- Graphium abri Smith & Vane-Wright, 2001

Synonyms
- Graphium (Arisbe) abri

= Graphium abri =

Species of butterfly

Graphium abri is a butterfly in the family Papilionidae. It is found in the Central African Republic. and is known from just two individuals both lacking post discal markings.

== Taxonomy ==
Graphium abri belongs to a species group with 16 members. All are very similar.The species group members are:

- Graphium abri Smith & Vane-Wright, 2001
- Graphium adamastor (Boisduval, 1836)
- Graphium agamedes (Westwood, 1842)
- Graphium almansor (Honrath, 1884)
- Graphium auriger (Butler, 1876)
- Graphium aurivilliusi (Seeldrayers, 1896)
- Graphium fulleri (Grose-Smith, 1883)
- Graphium hachei (Dewitz, 1881)
- Graphium kigoma Carcasson, 1964
- Graphium olbrechtsi Berger, 1950
- Graphium poggianus (Honrath, 1884)
- Graphium rileyi Berger, 1950
- Graphium schubotzi (Schultze, 1913)
- Graphium simoni (Aurivillius, 1899),
- Graphium ucalegon (Hewitson, 1865)[
- Graphium ucalegonides (Staudinger, 1884)
