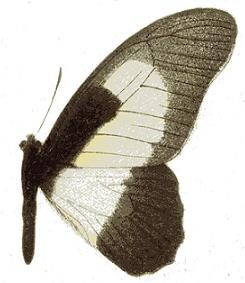
- Graphium hachei moebii

Scientific classification
- Kingdom: Animalia
- Phylum: Arthropoda
- Clade: Pancrustacea
- Class: Insecta
- Order: Lepidoptera
- Family: Papilionidae
- Genus: Graphium
- Species: G. hachei

Binomial name
- Graphium hachei (Dewitz, 1881)

Synonyms
- Papilio hachei Dewitz, 1881; Graphium (Arisbe) hachei; Papilio hachei-möbii camerunicus Le Cerf, 1924; Papilio moebii Suffert, 1904; Papilio (Cosmodesmus) martensi Dufrane, 1946

= Graphium hachei =

Species of butterfly

Graphium hachei, the elegant lady, is a butterfly in the family Papilionidae. It is found in Cameroon, Gabon, the Republic of Congo, Angola, the Democratic Republic of Congo and the Central African Republic.

== Subspecies ==
- Graphium hachei hachei (Cameroon, Gabon, Congo, Angola, western Democratic Republic of Congo)
- Graphium hachei moebii (Suffert, 1904) (Cameroon, Congo, northern and eastern Democratic Republic of Congo, Central African Republic)

== Description ==
Forewing black to blackish with a yellowish white half-band, which is very broad at the hindmargin, reaches vein 5 and is there connected with a large, similarly coloured spot in the apical half of the cell; this band completely covers the base of cellule 2 and only leaves the innermost part of cellule 1 b free; hindwing above from the base to considerably beyond the apex of the cell pure white with an unspotted black marginal band about 5 mm broad, which is narrowed towards the costal angle. — Congo region. Subspecies P. moebii Suff. (9 c) is very similar to the nominate and only differs essentially from it in that the white band of the forewing is somewhat narrower and leaves the base of cellule 2 free and that of the hindwing is only 12 mm broad and reaches neither the base nor the apex of the cell. — Congo region.

== Taxonomy ==
Graphium hachei belongs to a species group with 16 members. All are very similar The species group members are:

- Graphium abri Smith & Vane-Wright, 2001
- Graphium adamastor (Boisduval, 1836)
- Graphium agamedes (Westwood, 1842)
- Graphium almansor (Honrath, 1884)
- Graphium auriger (Butler, 1876)
- Graphium aurivilliusi (Seeldrayers, 1896)
- Graphium fulleri (Grose-Smith, 1883)
- Graphium hachei (Dewitz, 1881)
- Graphium kigoma Carcasson, 1964
- Graphium olbrechtsi Berger, 1950
- Graphium poggianus (Honrath, 1884)
- Graphium rileyi Berger, 1950
- Graphium schubotzi (Schultze, 1913)
- Graphium simoni (Aurivillius, 1899),
- Graphium ucalegon (Hewitson, 1865)[
- Graphium ucalegonides (Staudinger, 1884)

== Images ==
External images from Royal Museum of Central Africa.
