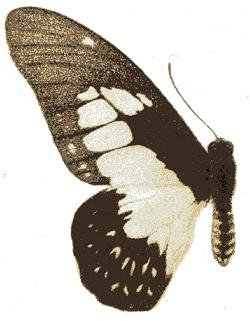

Scientific classification
- Kingdom: Animalia
- Phylum: Arthropoda
- Clade: Pancrustacea
- Class: Insecta
- Order: Lepidoptera
- Family: Papilionidae
- Genus: Graphium
- Species: G. agamedes

Binomial name
- Graphium agamedes (Westwood, 1842)

Synonyms
- Papilio agamedes Westwood, 1842; Graphium (Arisbe) agamedes; Papilio agamedes medesaga Suffert, 1904

= Graphium agamedes =

Species of butterfly

Graphium agamedes, the Westwood's white lady, is a butterfly in the family Papilionidae (swallowtails). It is found in Ivory Coast, Ghana, Togo, Benin, Nigeria, Cameroon, the Central African Republic and the Democratic Republic of the Congo. The habitat consists of the forest/savanna transition zone.

== Description ==
For terms see External morphology of Lepidoptera The broad black marginal band of the hindwing is always ornamented with light spots. The wings have a common light median band, which does not reach the base of the hindwing and is interrupted in cellule 5 of the forewing. Hindwing beneath without black basal, dot in cellule 7 and consequently with only two such dots. Hindwing with 3—8 usually double sub¬marginal spots. Markings white; the median band of the forewing continuous to vein 5, not covering the base of cellules 1 a and 1 b; the large white spot in the cell of the forewing (opposite to cellule 8) does not reach the front margin of the cell; forewing deep black at the base, much darker than in the discal half; the basal spot in cellule 2 of the hindwing incised distally; hindwing with two sub¬marginal and two discal streaks each in cellules 2 to 4 or 5. Ashanti and Togo. ab. medesaga Suff. only differs in that the forewing has a small spot in the apex of the cell and a double submarginal spot in cellule.

== Taxonomy ==
Graphium agamedes belongs to a species group with 16 members. All are very similar The species group members are:

- Graphium abri Smith & Vane-Wright, 2001
- Graphium adamastor (Boisduval, 1836)
- Graphium agamedes (Westwood, 1842)
- Graphium almansor (Honrath, 1884)
- Graphium auriger (Butler, 1876)
- Graphium aurivilliusi (Seeldrayers, 1896)
- Graphium fulleri (Grose-Smith, 1883)
- Graphium hachei (Dewitz, 1881)
- Graphium kigoma Carcasson, 1964
- Graphium olbrechtsi Berger, 1950
- Graphium poggianus (Honrath, 1884)
- Graphium rileyi Berger, 1950
- Graphium schubotzi (Schultze, 1913)
- Graphium simoni (Aurivillius, 1899),
- Graphium ucalegon (Hewitson, 1865)[
- Graphium ucalegonides (Staudinger, 1884)

== Images ==
External images from Royal Museum of Central Africa.
