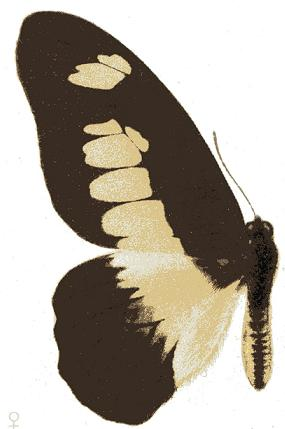

Scientific classification
- Kingdom: Animalia
- Phylum: Arthropoda
- Clade: Pancrustacea
- Class: Insecta
- Order: Lepidoptera
- Family: Papilionidae
- Genus: Graphium
- Species: G. ucalegon

Binomial name
- Graphium ucalegon (Hewitson, 1865)

Synonyms
- Papilio ucalegon Hewitson, 1865; Graphium (Arisbe) ucalegon; Papilio ucalegon legonuca Suffert, 1904; Papilio ucalegon ab. superfluosa Strand, 1912; Papilio ucalegon ab. addenda Strand, 1913; Graphium ucalegon schoutedeni f. fontainei Berger, 1950

= Graphium ucalegon =

Species of butterfly

Graphium ucalegon, the creamy graphium, is a butterfly in the family Papilionidae (swallowtails). It is found in Nigeria, Cameroon, Equatorial Guinea, Gabon, the Republic of the Congo, Angola, the Central African Republic, the Democratic Republic of the Congo, Uganda and Tanzania. Its habitat consists of primary forests.

Adults are on wing mainly just before the beginning of the rain season. Adult males mud-puddle, but have also been observed feeding on rotten fish.

== Subspecies ==
- Graphium ucalegon ucalegon (western Nigeria, Cameroon, Equatorial Guinea, Gabon, Congo, north-western Angola, Central African Republic, Democratic Republic of the Congo)
- Graphium ucalegon fonteinei Berger, 1981 (Democratic Republic of the Congo: Sankuru, Kabinda, Lomami, Lualaba)
- Graphium ucalegon schoutedeni Berger, 1950 (eastern Democratic Republic of the Congo, western Uganda, north-western Tanzania)

== Taxonomy ==
Graphium ucalegon belongs to a species group with 16 members. All are very similar. The species group members are:

- Graphium abri Smith & Vane-Wright, 2001
- Graphium adamastor (Boisduval, 1836)
- Graphium agamedes (Westwood, 1842)
- Graphium almansor (Honrath, 1884)
- Graphium auriger (Butler, 1876)
- Graphium aurivilliusi (Seeldrayers, 1896)
- Graphium fulleri (Grose-Smith, 1883)
- Graphium hachei (Dewitz, 1881)
- Graphium kigoma Carcasson, 1964
- Graphium olbrechtsi Berger, 1950
- Graphium poggianus (Honrath, 1884)
- Graphium rileyi Berger, 1950
- Graphium schubotzi (Schultze, 1913)
- Graphium simoni (Aurivillius, 1899),
- Graphium ucalegon (Hewitson, 1865)[
- Graphium ucalegonides (Staudinger, 1884)

== Images ==
External images from Royal Museum of Central Africa.
