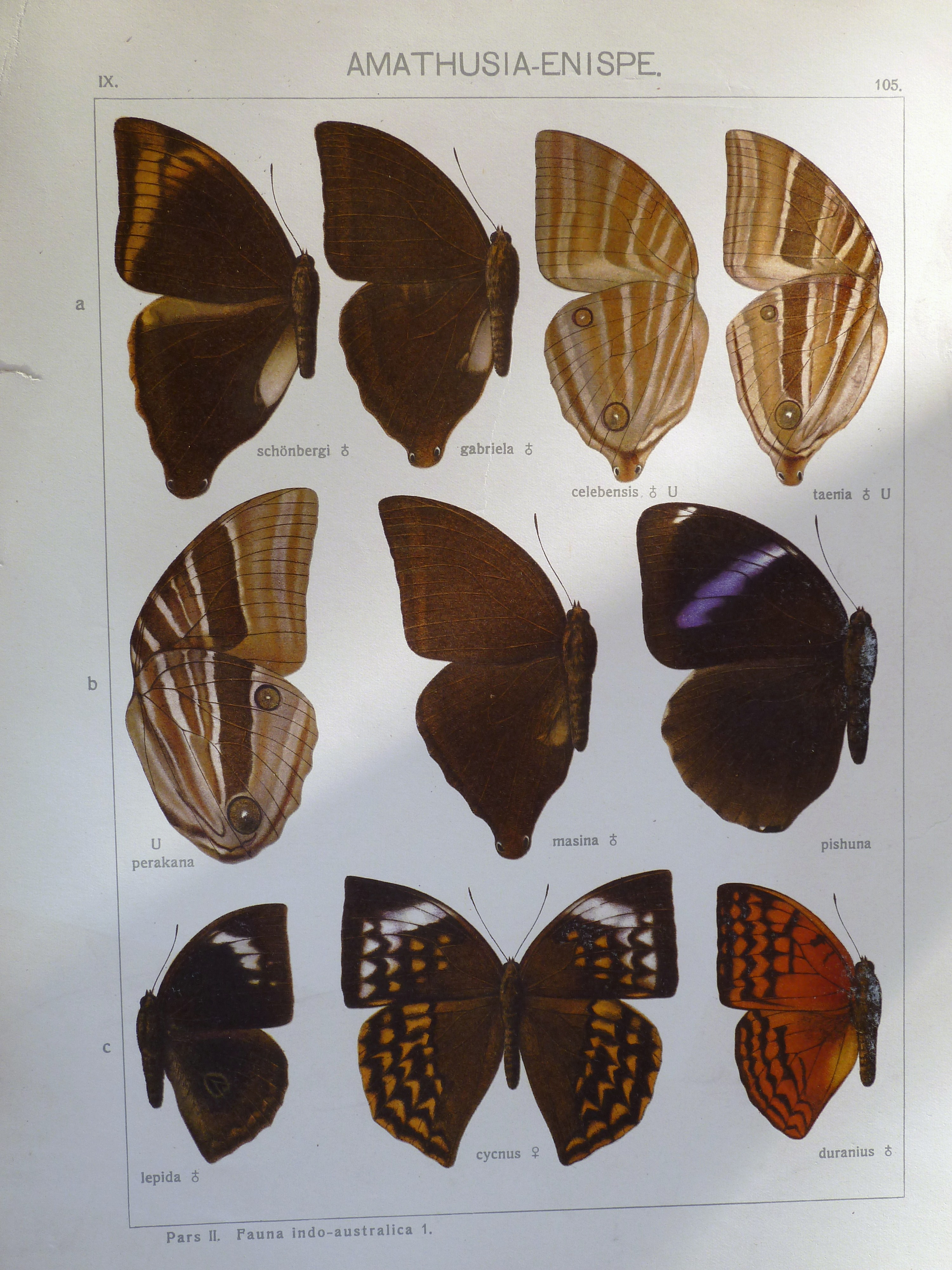

Scientific classification
- Domain: Eukaryota
- Kingdom: Animalia
- Phylum: Arthropoda
- Class: Insecta
- Order: Lepidoptera
- Family: Nymphalidae
- Genus: Amathusia
- Species: A. masina

Binomial name
- Amathusia masina Fruhstorfer, 1904

= Amathusia masina =

Species of butterfly

Amathusia masina, the rusty palmking, is a butterfly found in the Indomalayan realm It belongs to the Morphinae, a subfamily of the brush-footed butterflies.

== Description ==
Described as a new species of Amathusia characterised by the oval depression of the scent organ on the upper hindwing having an oval hair tuft near the base of space seven and a hair pencil. The ground colour is rich reddish brown and there are basal white stripes

== Subspecies ==
- A. m. masina Borneo
- A. m. malaya Corbet & Pendlebury, 1936 Peninsular Malaya, Sumatra
- A. m. chtonia Fruhstorfer Bangka Island
