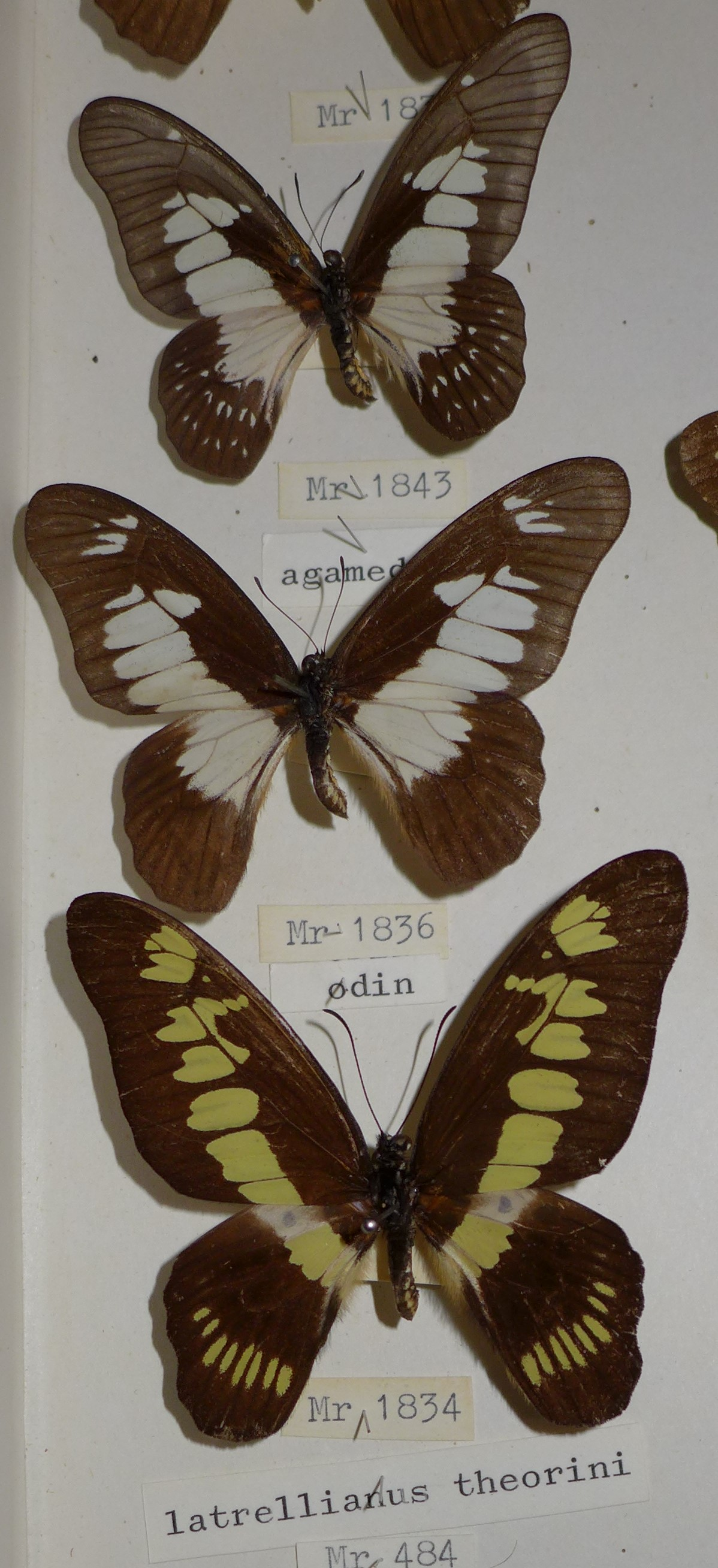

Scientific classification
- Kingdom: Animalia
- Phylum: Arthropoda
- Clade: Pancrustacea
- Class: Insecta
- Order: Lepidoptera
- Family: Papilionidae
- Genus: Graphium
- Species: G. schubotzi

Binomial name
- Graphium schubotzi (Schultze, 1913)

Synonyms
- Papilio [odin] var. schubotzi Schultze, 1913; Graphium (Arisbe) schubotzi; Papilio odin Strand, 1910; Graphium odin eyeni Berger, 1950

= Graphium schubotzi =

Species of butterfly

Graphium schubotzi is a butterfly in the family Papilionidae (swallowtails). It is found in eastern Cameroon, the Republic of the Congo, the Central African Republic and the Democratic Republic of the Congo. Its habitat consists of the forest/savanna transition zone.

== Subspecies ==
- Graphium schubotzi schubotzi (eastern Cameroon, Congo, Central African Republic, Democratic Republic of the Congo)
- Graphium schubotzi maculata Libert, 2007 (Cameroon)

== Taxonomy ==
Graphium schubotzi belongs to a species group with 16 members. All are very similar The species group members are:

- Graphium abri Smith & Vane-Wright, 2001
- Graphium adamastor (Boisduval, 1836)
- Graphium agamedes (Westwood, 1842)
- Graphium almansor (Honrath, 1884)
- Graphium auriger (Butler, 1876)
- Graphium aurivilliusi (Seeldrayers, 1896)
- Graphium fulleri (Grose-Smith, 1883)
- Graphium hachei (Dewitz, 1881)
- Graphium kigoma Carcasson, 1964
- Graphium olbrechtsi Berger, 1950
- Graphium poggianus (Honrath, 1884)
- Graphium rileyi Berger, 1950
- Graphium schubotzi (Schultze, 1913)
- Graphium simoni (Aurivillius, 1899),
- Graphium ucalegon (Hewitson, 1865)[
- Graphium ucalegonides (Staudinger, 1884)

G. olbrechtsi and G. odin are regarded as conspecific with G. auriger by Hancock (1983)

== Images ==
- External images from Royal Museum of Central Africa. both eyeni and schubotzi as ssp. of auriger
- Royal Museum for Central Africa
