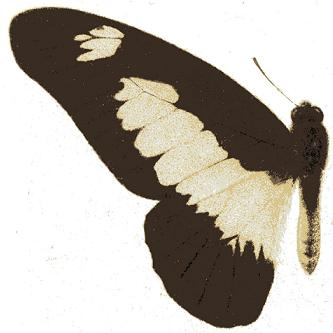

Scientific classification
- Kingdom: Animalia
- Phylum: Arthropoda
- Clade: Pancrustacea
- Class: Insecta
- Order: Lepidoptera
- Family: Papilionidae
- Genus: Graphium
- Species: G. auriger

Binomial name
- Graphium auriger (Butler, 1876)

Synonyms
- Papilio auriger Butler, 1876; Graphium (Arisbe) auriger; Papilio harpagon Grose-Smith, 1890

= Graphium auriger =

Species of butterfly

Graphium auriger is a butterfly in the family Papilionidae. It is found in Senegal, Cameroon, Equatorial Guinea, Gabon, the Republic of the Congo, the Central African Republic and the Democratic Republic of the Congo.

== Description ==
Wings above black with white median band, about 10 mm broad, interrupted in cellule 5 of the forewing, and without submarginal spots; hindwing beneath at the base deep black with an orange-yellow spot at the base of the costal margin - Gaboon.

== Taxonomy ==
Graphium auriger belongs to a species group with 16 members. Two G. olbrechtsi and G. odin (synonym of G. schubotzi) may be conspecific with auriger. All are very similar The species group members are:

- Graphium abri Smith & Vane-Wright, 2001
- Graphium adamastor (Boisduval, 1836)
- Graphium agamedes (Westwood, 1842)
- Graphium almansor (Honrath, 1884)
- Graphium auriger (Butler, 1876)
- Graphium aurivilliusi (Seeldrayers, 1896)
- Graphium fulleri (Grose-Smith, 1883)
- Graphium hachei (Dewitz, 1881)
- Graphium kigoma Carcasson, 1964
- Graphium olbrechtsi Berger, 1950
- Graphium poggianus (Honrath, 1884)
- Graphium rileyi Berger, 1950
- Graphium schubotzi (Schultze, 1913)
- Graphium simoni (Aurivillius, 1899),
- Graphium ucalegon (Hewitson, 1865)[
- Graphium ucalegonides (Staudinger, 1884)

== Images ==
External images from Royal Museum of Central Africa.
