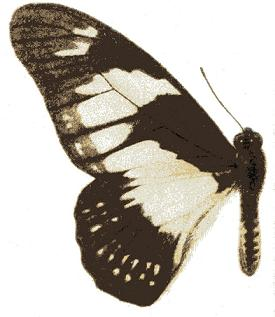

Scientific classification
- Kingdom: Animalia
- Phylum: Arthropoda
- Clade: Pancrustacea
- Class: Insecta
- Order: Lepidoptera
- Family: Papilionidae
- Genus: Graphium
- Species: G. adamastor

Binomial name
- Graphium adamastor (Boisduval, 1836)

Synonyms
- Papilio adamastor Boisduval, 1836; Graphium (Arisbe) adamastor; Papilio (Cosmodesmus) charcedonius ab. guineensis Dufrane, 1946; Pailio (Cosmodesmus) charcedonius ab. houzeaui Dufrane, 1946; Graphium adamastor dimbroko Berger, 1950; Graphium adamastor zongo Berger, 1950

= Graphium adamastor =

Species of butterfly

Graphium adamastor, the Boisduval's white lady, is a butterfly in the family Papilionidae (swallowtails). It is found in Guinea, Sierra Leone, Mali, Burkina Faso, Ivory Coast, Ghana, Togo, Benin, Nigeria, Cameroon, the Republic of the Congo, the Central African Republic and the Democratic Republic of the Congo.

== Description ==
G.adamastor is very similar to the preceding species Graphium agamedes and only differs in that the transverse spot of the cell of the forewing is larger and reaches the front margin of the cell, the discal spot in cellule 2 on the contrary is smaller and rounded or entirely wanting, so that the median hand is here interrupted. — Ashanti and Togo.

Torben Larsen developed a species numbering system for his 2005 publication Butterflies of West Africa. This species is #25. The 'Larsen' numbers have since been used with permission in A Sharp Eye on Butterflies of Ghana.

== Biology ==
Its habitat consists of dry forests and the transition zone between forests and the Guinea savanna.

Adult females mimic Amauris damocles. Both sexes feed from flowers, including Calodendrum splendens.

The larvae feed on various Annonaceae species.

== Taxonomy ==
Graphium adamastor belongs to a species group with 16 members. All are very similar The species group members are:

- Graphium abri Smith & Vane-Wright, 2001
- Graphium adamastor (Boisduval, 1836)
- Graphium agamedes (Westwood, 1842)
- Graphium almansor (Honrath, 1884)
- Graphium auriger (Butler, 1876)
- Graphium aurivilliusi (Seeldrayers, 1896)
- Graphium fulleri (Grose-Smith, 1883)
- Graphium hachei (Dewitz, 1881)
- Graphium kigoma Carcasson, 1964
- Graphium olbrechtsi Berger, 1950
- Graphium poggianus (Honrath, 1884)
- Graphium rileyi Berger, 1950
- Graphium schubotzi (Schultze, 1913)
- Graphium simoni (Aurivillius, 1899),
- Graphium ucalegon (Hewitson, 1865)[
- Graphium ucalegonides (Staudinger, 1884)

== Images ==
External images from Royal Museum of Central Africa.
