= Amathusia friderici =

Scientific classification
- Domain: Eukaryota
- Kingdom: Animalia
- Phylum: Arthropoda
- Class: Insecta
- Order: Lepidoptera
- Family: Nymphalidae
- Genus: Amathusia
- Species: A. friderici

Binomial name
- Amathusia friderici Fruhstorfer, 1904

Species of butterfly

Amathusia friderici, commonly known as bicolor-haired palmking, is a butterfly found in the Indomalayan realm It belongs to the Satyrinae, a subfamily of the brush-footed butterflies.

== Description ==
Described as a variety of Amathusia phidippus from which it differs in the following minor respects. The upper hindwing has a concealed hair pencil (scent pencil-a dorsal glandular fold or oval shaped depression on the wing membrane covered by pencils of long hairs) in space 1b. The fringe in 1a is black-brown and just crosses vein 1a .The upper hairs of the abdominal hair pencil are dark grey-brown; the lower hairs are light yellowish buff. The female has a darker ground colour than Amathusia phidippus with rich clear pale orange subapical marks. Images at gbif including A. f. holmanhunti f. utana Corbet & Pendlebury, 1936

== Subspecies ==
- Amathusia friderici friderici Burma - Tenasserim
- Amathusia friderici holmanhunti Corbet & Pendlebury, 1936 Peninsular Malaya
- A. utana Corbet & Pendlebury, 1936 Peninsular Malaya, Sumatra, Java
