= Graphium kigoma =

Scientific classification
- Kingdom: Animalia
- Phylum: Arthropoda
- Clade: Pancrustacea
- Class: Insecta
- Order: Lepidoptera
- Family: Papilionidae
- Genus: Graphium
- Species: G. kigoma

Binomial name
- Graphium kigoma Carcasson, 1964

Synonyms
- Graphium (Arisbe) kigoma; Graphium almansor wranghami Kielland, 1978; Graphium (Arisbe) almansor kigoma Carcasson, 1964; Graphium poggianus kigoma

Species of butterfly

Graphium kigoma is a butterfly in the family Papilionidae (swallowtails). It is found in Tanzania, from the western part of the country to the Kigoma District. The habitat consists of forests (including riparian forests) and heavy woodland.

== Taxonomy ==
Graphium kigoma belongs to a species group with 16 members.It may be a subspecies of Graphium almansor. All are very similar The species group members are:

- Graphium abri Smith & Vane-Wright, 2001
- Graphium adamastor (Boisduval, 1836)
- Graphium agamedes (Westwood, 1842)
- Graphium almansor (Honrath, 1884)
- Graphium auriger (Butler, 1876)
- Graphium aurivilliusi (Seeldrayers, 1896)
- Graphium fulleri (Grose-Smith, 1883)
- Graphium hachei (Dewitz, 1881)
- Graphium kigoma Carcasson, 1964
- Graphium olbrechtsi Berger, 1950
- Graphium poggianus (Honrath, 1884)
- Graphium rileyi Berger, 1950
- Graphium schubotzi (Schultze, 1913)
- Graphium simoni (Aurivillius, 1899),
- Graphium ucalegon (Hewitson, 1865)[
- Graphium ucalegonides (Staudinger, 1884)
