= Graphium simoni =

Scientific classification
- Kingdom: Animalia
- Phylum: Arthropoda
- Clade: Pancrustacea
- Class: Insecta
- Order: Lepidoptera
- Family: Papilionidae
- Genus: Graphium
- Species: G. simoni

Binomial name
- Graphium simoni (Aurivillius, 1899)

Synonyms
- Papilio ucalegon var. simoni Aurivillius, 1899; Graphium (Arisbe) simoni

Species of butterfly

Graphium simoni is a butterfly in the family Papilionidae (swallowtails). It is found in Nigeria, Cameroon, Gabon, the Republic of the Congo, the Democratic Republic of the Congo and the Central African Republic.

== Description ==
In simoni Auriv. the median band is almost pure white, beneath on the hindwing sharply defined at both sides; the spot in the cell of the forewing is large, triangular and its apex often reaches the front margin of the cell, forming a transverse band much narrowed anteriorly. In the northern part of the Congo region.

== Taxonomy ==
Graphium simoni belongs to a species group with 16 members. All are very similar.simoni may be a form of Graphium ucalegon. The species group members are:

- Graphium abri Smith & Vane-Wright, 2001
- Graphium adamastor (Boisduval, 1836)
- Graphium agamedes (Westwood, 1842)
- Graphium almansor (Honrath, 1884)
- Graphium auriger (Butler, 1876)
- Graphium aurivilliusi (Seeldrayers, 1896)
- Graphium fulleri (Grose-Smith, 1883)
- Graphium hachei (Dewitz, 1881)
- Graphium kigoma Carcasson, 1964
- Graphium olbrechtsi Berger, 1950
- Graphium poggianus (Honrath, 1884)
- Graphium rileyi Berger, 1950
- Graphium schubotzi (Schultze, 1913)
- Graphium simoni (Aurivillius, 1899),
- Graphium ucalegon (Hewitson, 1865)[
- Graphium ucalegonides (Staudinger, 1884)

== Images ==
External images from Royal Museum of Central Africa.
