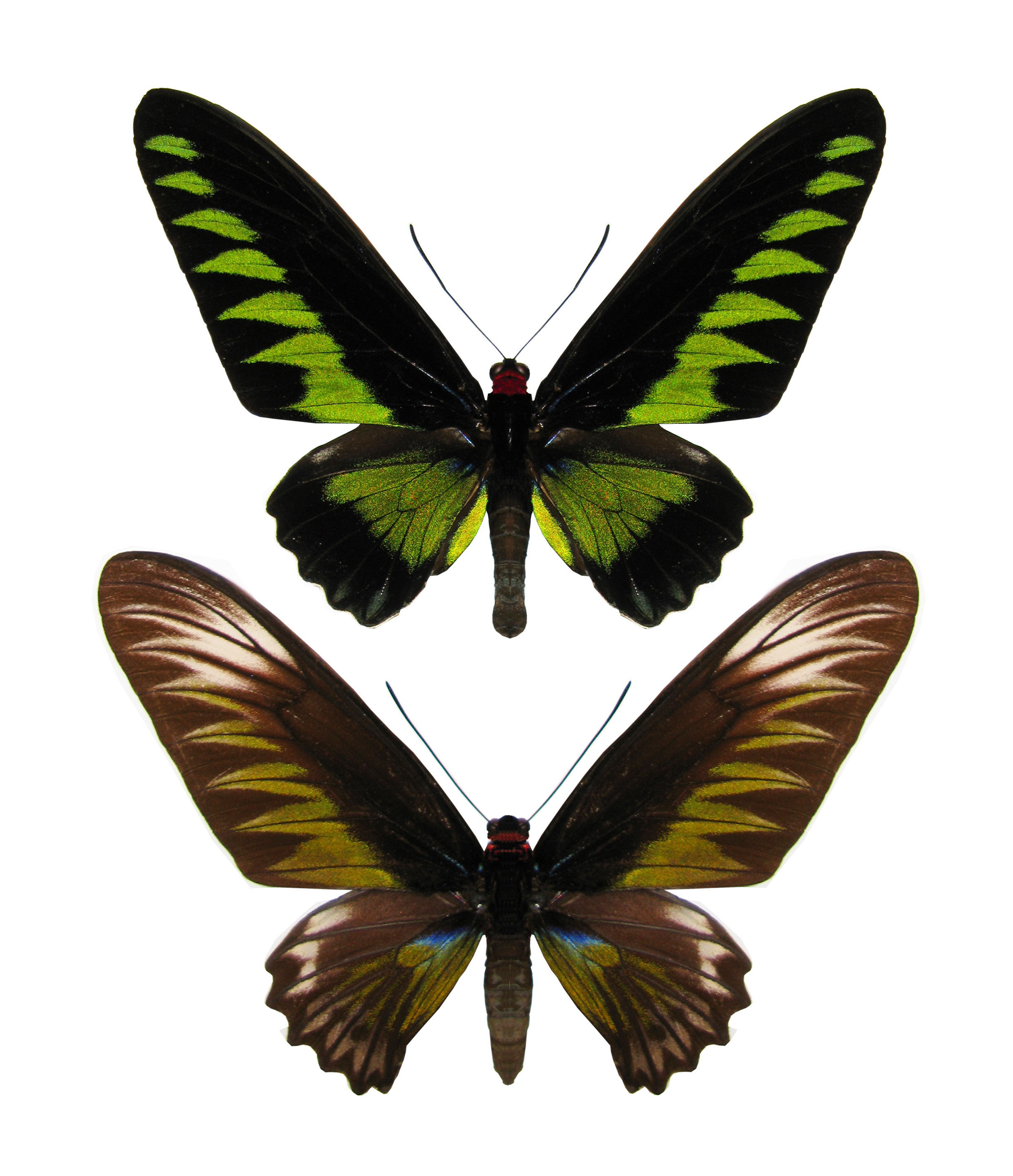
- Trogonoptera brookiana male (top) and female (bottom)

Scientific classification
- Kingdom: Animalia
- Phylum: Arthropoda
- Class: Insecta
- Order: Lepidoptera
- Family: Papilionidae
- Tribe: Troidini
- Genus: Trogonoptera; Rippon, 1890

= Trogonoptera =

Genus of butterfly

Trogonoptera is a genus of birdwing butterflies from the rainforests of the Thai-Malay Peninsula, Borneo, Natuna, Sumatra, Palawan, and various small islands west of Sumatra. Their large size and stunning colors makes them highly prized by collectors. There are at least three theories as to why these butterflies have such distinctive markings on their wings: (1) the alternate green/black spear shapes mimic sharp thorns; (2) the green spear shapes mimic the camouflage pattern of a fern leaf when the butterfly is resting; (3) when flying, the black and green markings mimic those of green broadbill bird feathers in flight. The three green broadbill species in Borneo are found in the same habitats as Rajah Brooke's birdwing, which occurs from the forested lowlands up to 2.000 m on Mount Kinabalu. A number of observers have noted that all Borneo's birdwing butterflies are so large that they are easily mistaken for birds in flight. A bird hunting for an insect to eat would be unlikely to attack a bird. If the butterfly wing pattern mimics the broadbill's feathers then it would be a case of a Müllerian mimicry ring because both species have wings covered with thornlike patterns. In addition the broadbills are protected because of their large beaks and the butterfly because it is poisonous. The blue colors evolved in Trogonoptera brookiana form hecata and Trogonoptera trojana may be explained by the presence of fairy-bluebirds in their habitat.

== Species ==
Two species are recognized in this genus:

- Trogonoptera brookiana – Rajah Brooke's birdwing
- Trogonoptera trojana – Triangle birdwing
