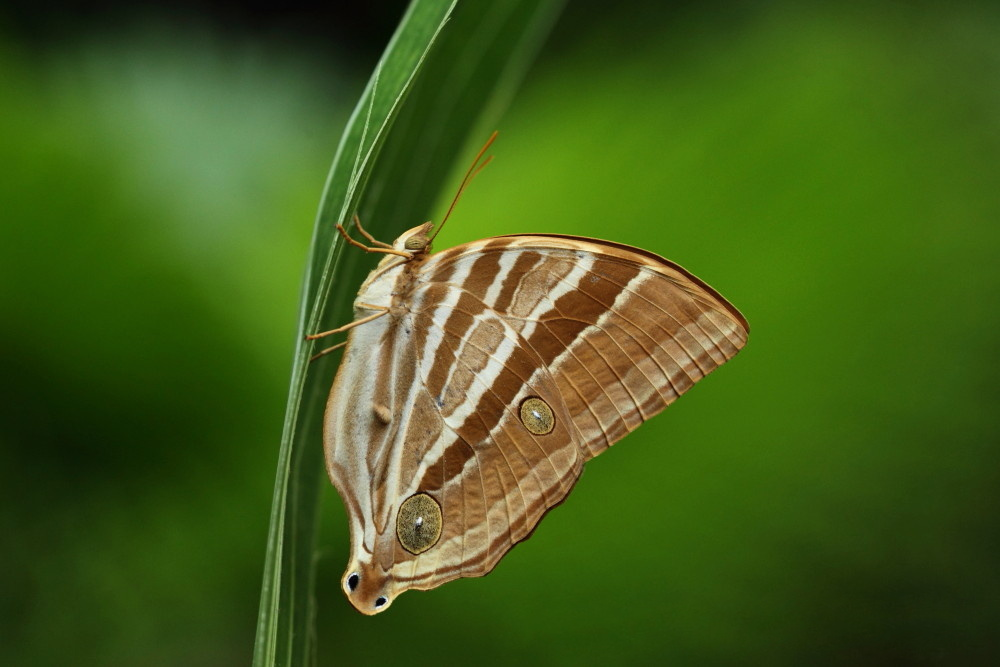

Scientific classification
- Kingdom: Animalia
- Phylum: Arthropoda
- Class: Insecta
- Order: Lepidoptera
- Family: Nymphalidae
- Tribe: Amathusiini
- Genus: Amathusia; Fabricius, 1807

Synonyms
- Moera Hübner, [1819]; Mitocerus Billberg, 1820; Thoraessa Westwood, [1850]; Pseudamathusia Honrath, 1886; Ategana Stichel, 1906; Syntegana Stichel, 1906

= Amathusia (butterfly) =

Genus of brush-footed butterflies

Amathusia is a genus of large forest butterflies with "wingtails" in the family Nymphalidae. They are known as the palmkings and the larvae feed on palms (Arecaceae). Amathusia ranges from the Andaman Islands to Sulawesi.

== Species ==
- Subgenus Amathusia
  - Amathusia andamanensis Fruhstorfer, 1899
  - Amathusia binghami Fruhstorfer, 1904
  - Amathusia duponti Toxopeus, 1951
  - Amathusia friderici Fruhstorfer, 1904
  - Amathusia lieftincki Toxopeus, 1951
  - Amathusia masina (Fruhstorfer, 1904)
  - Amathusia ochraceofusca Honrath, [1888]
  - Amathusia ochrotaenia Toxopeus, 1951
  - Amathusia patalena Westwood, 1848
  - Amathusia perakana Honrath, [1888]
  - Amathusia phidippus (Linnaeus, 1763)
  - Amathusia schoenbergi Honrath, [1888]
  - Amathusia taenia Fruhstorfer, 1899
- Subgenus Pseudamathusia Honrath, 1886
  - Amathusia virgata Butler, 1870
