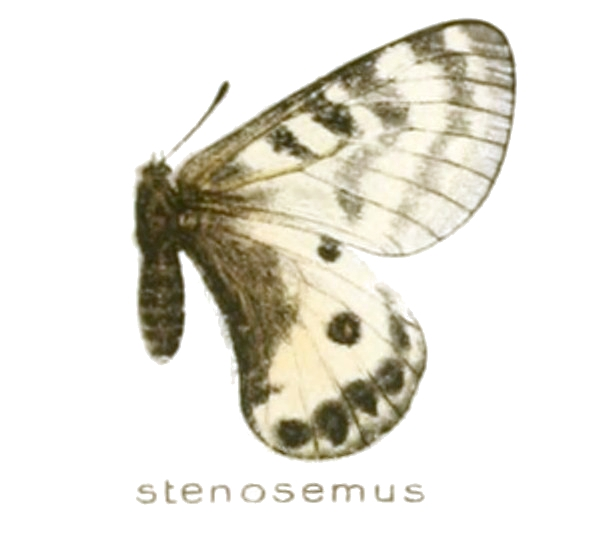
- Figure in Adalbert Seitz's Macrolepidoptera of the World

Scientific classification
- Domain: Eukaryota
- Kingdom: Animalia
- Phylum: Arthropoda
- Class: Insecta
- Order: Lepidoptera
- Family: Papilionidae
- Genus: Parnassius
- Species: P. stenosemus

Binomial name
- Parnassius stenosemus (Honrath, 1890)

= Parnassius stenosemus =

Species of butterfly

Parnassius stenosemus is a high-altitude butterfly which is found in north India (Ladakh). It is a member of the snow Apollo genus (Parnassius) of the swallowtail family (Papilionidae).

P. stenosemus was originally described as a subspecies of P. delphius and has also been regarded as conspecific with P. stoliczkanus. It was treated as a good (true) species by Felix Bryk in 1935, a view accepted by many later authors including Weiss (1992).

== Description ==
Larger than P. delphius and P. stoliczkanus, the markings are less well defined, bands of forewing complete, the discal one posteriorly sometimes separated into spots, hindwing with narrow marginal band, two to four blue-centred submarginal spots, being preceded by a narrowly shaded band; the anterior ocellus sometimes absent, or reduced to a black dot. Kashmir (Ladak, Kutie pass)
