= Graphium ucalegonides =

Scientific classification
- Kingdom: Animalia
- Phylum: Arthropoda
- Clade: Pancrustacea
- Class: Insecta
- Order: Lepidoptera
- Family: Papilionidae
- Genus: Graphium
- Species: G. ucalegonides

Binomial name
- Graphium ucalegonides (Staudinger, 1884)

Synonyms
- Papilio ucalegonides Staudinger, 1884; Graphium (Arisbe) ucalegonides; Papilio phrynon Druce, 1895; Papilio (Cosmodesmus) ucalegonides ab. cuvelieri Dufrane, 1946; Graphium ucalegonides ucalegonides f. addenda Berger, 1950

Species of butterfly

Graphium ucalegonides is a butterfly in the family Papilionidae (swallowtails). It is found in Cameroon, the Republic of the Congo, northern Angola, the Democratic Republic of the Congo and Chad.

== Description ==
ucalegonides Stgr. has the median band more or less yellowish, beneath on the hindwing indistinctly defined and not sharply prominent; the discal spots of the forewing are very inconstant, so that sometimes one, sometimes the other is small or absent, the band being interrupted. In the central and southern districts of the Congo region. [of phrynon Druce, 1895] Forewing red-brown, a cream-coloured, broken spot near to the apex larger than in Graphium ucalegon-, a streak in the cell along the hindmargin and a long, angular spot in cellule 3, which almost reaches the margin, cream-coloured; a cream-coloured spot at the middle of the hindmargin in cellule 1 a and a large similar spot in lb; hindwing gold-brown with broad cream-coloured median band; hindwing beneath lighter than above, with black veins and dark red-brown basal area, but without light median band. This form (unknown to me) is perhaps only an aberration of ucalegonides in which the discal spots 2, 4 and 5 of the forewing are entirely wanting. — Upper Congo.

== Images ==
External images from Royal Museum of Central Africa.

== Taxonomy ==
Graphium ucalegonides belongs to a species group with 16 members. All are very similar The species group members are:

- Graphium abri Smith & Vane-Wright, 2001
- Graphium adamastor (Boisduval, 1836)
- Graphium agamedes (Westwood, 1842)
- Graphium almansor (Honrath, 1884)
- Graphium auriger (Butler, 1876)
- Graphium aurivilliusi (Seeldrayers, 1896)
- Graphium fulleri (Grose-Smith, 1883)
- Graphium hachei (Dewitz, 1881)
- Graphium kigoma Carcasson, 1964
- Graphium olbrechtsi Berger, 1950
- Graphium poggianus (Honrath, 1884)
- Graphium rileyi Berger, 1950
- Graphium schubotzi (Schultze, 1913)
- Graphium simoni (Aurivillius, 1899),
- Graphium ucalegon (Hewitson, 1865)[
- Graphium ucalegonides (Staudinger, 1884)

It is treated as a full species by some authors, but is also treated as a subspecies of Graphium fulleri (Grose-Smith, 1883) by Smith & Vane-Wright (2001).

== See also ==
- Ituri Rainforest Habitat in Congo
