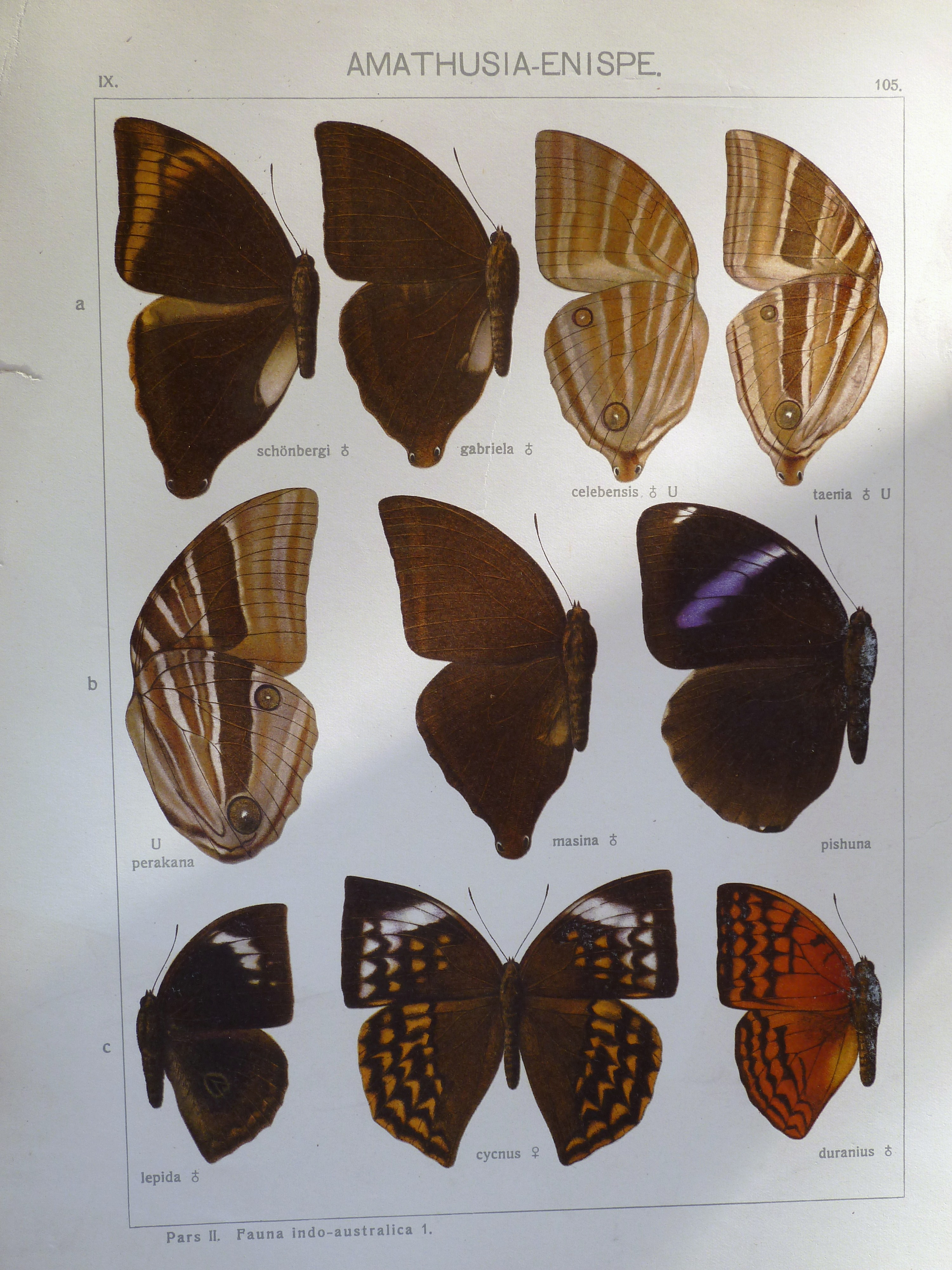

Scientific classification
- Domain: Eukaryota
- Kingdom: Animalia
- Phylum: Arthropoda
- Class: Insecta
- Order: Lepidoptera
- Family: Nymphalidae
- Genus: Amathusia
- Species: A. schoenbergi

Binomial name
- Amathusia schoenbergi Honrath, [1888]

= Amathusia schoenbergi =

Species of butterfly

Amathusia schoenbergi , the Scaling palmking, is a butterfly found in the Indomalayan realm It belongs to the Satyrinae, a subfamily of the brush-footed butterflies.

== Description ==
Deep indentations at veins 2, 3, 4, 5 and 6. Male upper hindwing has a hair pencil (scent pencil-a dorsal glandular fold or oval shaped depression on the wing membrane covered by pencils of long hairs) .

== Subspecies ==
- A. s. schoenbergi Sumatra, Peninsular Malaya
- A. s. borneensis Fruhstorfer, 1899 Borneo
