= Graphium rileyi =

Riley's graphium

Scientific classification
- Kingdom: Animalia
- Phylum: Arthropoda
- Clade: Pancrustacea
- Class: Insecta
- Order: Lepidoptera
- Family: Papilionidae
- Genus: Graphium
- Species: G. rileyi

Binomial name
- Graphium rileyi Berger, 1950

Synonyms
- Graphium (Arisbe) rileyi; Graphium ucalegonides rileyi Berger, 1950; Graphium fulleri rileyi Smith & Vane-Wright, 2001

Species of butterfly

Graphium rileyi, the Riley's graphium or blotched lady, is a butterfly in the family Papilionidae (swallowtails). It is found in Ivory Coast and central Ghana. Its habitat consists of semi-deciduous and upland forests.

== Taxonomy ==
Graphium rileyi belongs to a species group with 16 members. All are very similar The species group members are:

- Graphium abri Smith & Vane-Wright, 2001
- Graphium adamastor (Boisduval, 1836)
- Graphium agamedes (Westwood, 1842)
- Graphium almansor (Honrath, 1884)
- Graphium auriger (Butler, 1876)
- Graphium aurivilliusi (Seeldrayers, 1896)
- Graphium fulleri (Grose-Smith, 1883)
- Graphium hachei (Dewitz, 1881)
- Graphium kigoma Carcasson, 1964
- Graphium olbrechtsi Berger, 1950
- Graphium poggianus (Honrath, 1884)
- Graphium rileyi Berger, 1950
- Graphium schubotzi (Schultze, 1913)
- Graphium simoni (Aurivillius, 1899),
- Graphium ucalegon (Hewitson, 1865)[
- Graphium ucalegonides (Staudinger, 1884)

rileyi may be a form of Graphium ucalegonides.Images at Royal Africa Museum
