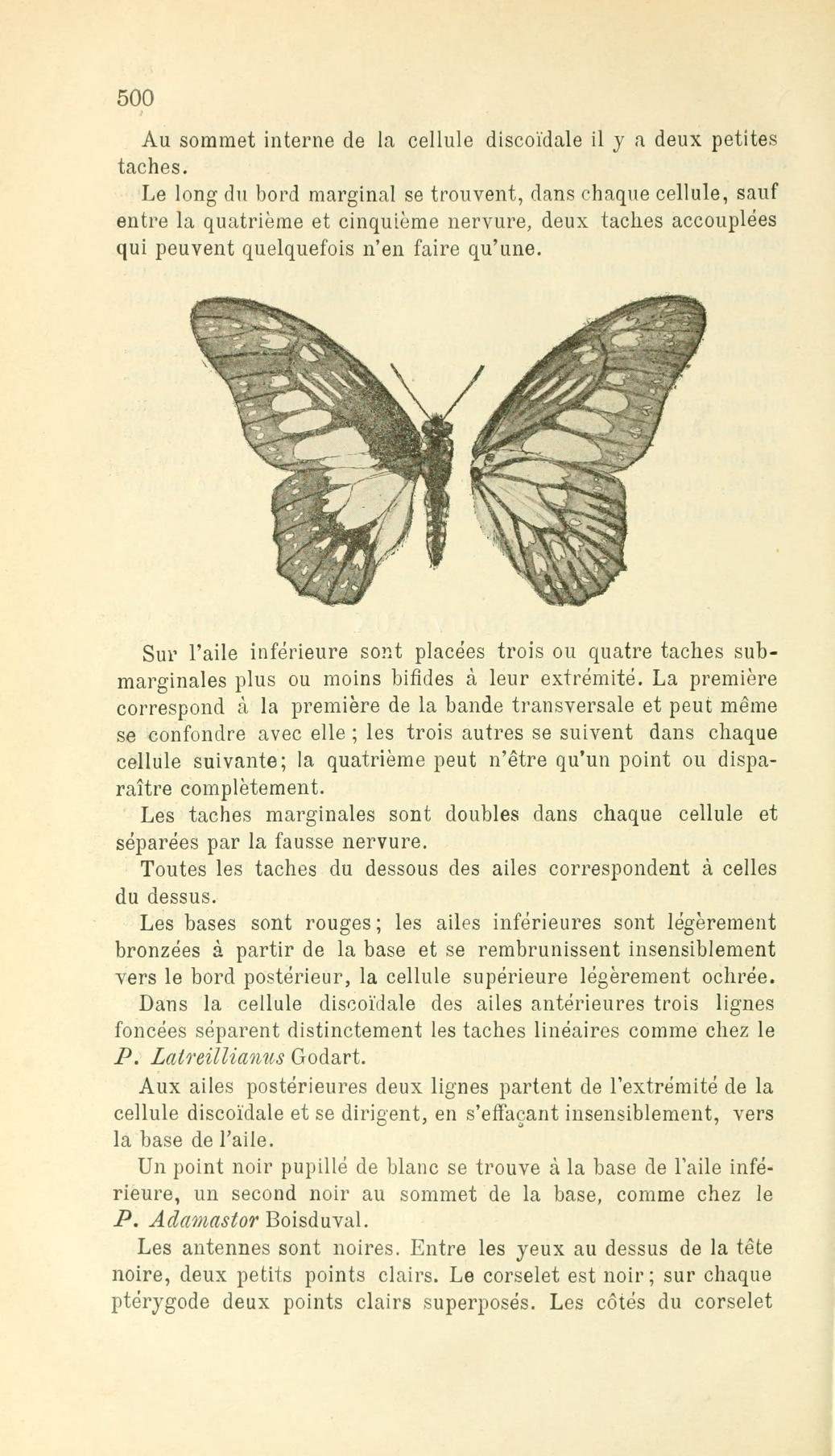
- Original description from Annales de la Société entomologique de Belgique (1897)

Conservation status
- Data Deficient (IUCN 2.3)

Scientific classification
- Kingdom: Animalia
- Phylum: Arthropoda
- Clade: Pancrustacea
- Class: Insecta
- Order: Lepidoptera
- Family: Papilionidae
- Genus: Graphium
- Species: G. aurivilliusi

Binomial name
- Graphium aurivilliusi (Seeldrayers, 1896).

Synonyms
- Papilio aurivilliusi Seeldrayers, 1896; Graphium auriger aurivilliusi; Hancock, 1993

= Graphium aurivilliusi =

Species of butterfly

Graphium aurivilliusi is a species of butterfly in the family Papilionidae (swallowtails). It is endemic to the Democratic Republic of the Congo. It is only known from the type series of males.The type specimens is labelled "Congo" only. It may be a form of Graphium agamedes.

== Description ==
The broad black marginal band of the hindwing is always ornamented with light spots. The wings have a common light median band, which does not reach the base of the hindwing and is interrupted in cellule 5 of the forewing. Hindwing beneath without black basal, dot in cellule 7 and consequently with only two such dots. Hindwing with 3—8 usually double sub¬ marginal spots. Markings white, slightly suffused with greenish; discal spots 1 a and 1 b of the forewing do not cover the base of these cellules; both wings with two small streak-like submarginal spots in each cellule; hindwing above with a single discal spot in each of cellules 2–4; the white basal spot of cellule 2 of the hindwing obliquely cut off distally and sharply defined; the cell of the forewing with 3—4 white longitudinal streaks opposite to cellule 3 and with a white costal marginal spot just before the apex.Congo region.

== Taxonomy ==
Graphium aurivilliusi belongs to a species group with 16 members. All are very similar The species group members are:

- Graphium abri Smith & Vane-Wright, 2001
- Graphium adamastor (Boisduval, 1836)
- Graphium agamedes (Westwood, 1842)
- Graphium almansor (Honrath, 1884)
- Graphium auriger (Butler, 1876)
- Graphium aurivilliusi (Seeldrayers, 1896)
- Graphium fulleri (Grose-Smith, 1883)
- Graphium hachei (Dewitz, 1881)
- Graphium kigoma Carcasson, 1964
- Graphium olbrechtsi Berger, 1950
- Graphium poggianus (Honrath, 1884)
- Graphium rileyi Berger, 1950
- Graphium schubotzi (Schultze, 1913)
- Graphium simoni (Aurivillius, 1899),
- Graphium ucalegon (Hewitson, 1865)[
- Graphium ucalegonides (Staudinger, 1884)

== Images ==
External images from Royal Museum of Central Africa.
