= Graphium olbrechtsi =

Scientific classification
- Kingdom: Animalia
- Phylum: Arthropoda
- Clade: Pancrustacea
- Class: Insecta
- Order: Lepidoptera
- Family: Papilionidae
- Genus: Graphium
- Species: G. olbrechtsi

Binomial name
- Graphium olbrechtsi Berger, 1950

Synonyms
- Graphium (Arisbe) olbrechtsi

Species of butterfly

Graphium olbrechtsi is a butterfly in the family Papilionidae (swallowtails). It is found in the Democratic Republic of the Congo.

== Subspecies ==
- Graphium olbrechtsi olbrechtsi (Democratic Republic of the Congo: Kabinda, Lomami, Lualaba)
- Graphium olbrechtsi tongoni Berger, 1969 (Democratic Republic of the Congo: east to Maniema)

== Taxonomy ==
Graphium olbrechtsi belongs to a species group with 16 members. All are very similar The species group members are:

- Graphium abri Smith & Vane-Wright, 2001
- Graphium adamastor (Boisduval, 1836)
- Graphium agamedes (Westwood, 1842)
- Graphium almansor (Honrath, 1884)
- Graphium auriger (Butler, 1876)
- Graphium aurivilliusi (Seeldrayers, 1896)
- Graphium fulleri (Grose-Smith, 1883)
- Graphium hachei (Dewitz, 1881)
- Graphium kigoma Carcasson, 1964
- Graphium olbrechtsi Berger, 1950
- Graphium poggianus (Honrath, 1884)
- Graphium rileyi Berger, 1950
- Graphium schubotzi (Schultze, 1913)
- Graphium simoni (Aurivillius, 1899),
- Graphium ucalegon (Hewitson, 1865)[
- Graphium ucalegonides (Staudinger, 1884)

G. olbrechtsi and G. odin (synonym of schubotzi) are regarded as conspecific with G. auriger by Hancock (1983)

== Images ==
External images from Royal Museum of Central Africa.
