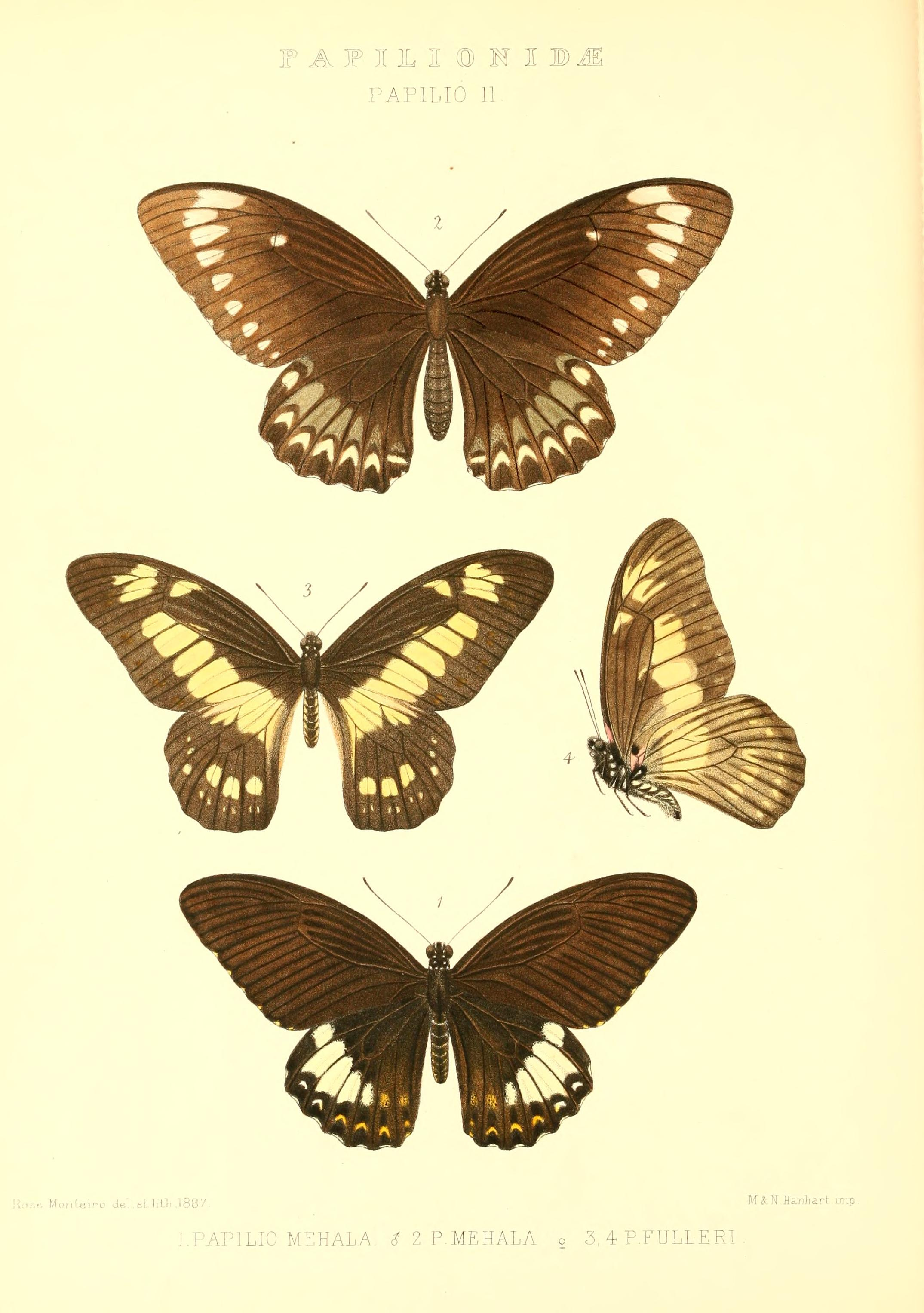
- Plate in Rhopalocera Exotica

Scientific classification
- Kingdom: Animalia
- Phylum: Arthropoda
- Clade: Pancrustacea
- Class: Insecta
- Order: Lepidoptera
- Family: Papilionidae
- Genus: Graphium
- Species: G. fulleri

Binomial name
- Graphium fulleri (Grose-Smith, 1883).

Synonyms
- Papilio fulleri Grose-Smith, 1883; Graphium (Arisbe) fulleri; Papilio boulleti var. transiens Le Cerf, 1912; Papilio foersterius Strand, 1913; Papilio sanganus Strand, 1913; Papilio sanganoides Strand, 1913; Papilio sanganoides ab. divisimacula Strand, 1913; Papilio stetteni Strand, 1913; Graphium ucalegonides ucalegonides f. gabrieli Berger, 1950; Papilio boulleti Le Cerf, 1912; Papilio weberi Holland, 1917; Graphium ucalegonides beloni Darge, 1995

= Graphium fulleri =

Species of butterfly

Graphium fulleri is a butterfly in the family Papilionidae (swallowtails). It is found in Cameroon, Equatorial Guinea, Gabon, the Republic of the Congo, Angola, the Democratic Republic of the Congo and Chad.

== Description ==
The broad black marginal band of the hindwing is always ornamented with light spots. The wings have a common light median band, which does not reach the base of the hindwing and is interrupted in cellule 5 of the forewing. Hindwing beneath without black basal, dot in cellule 7 and consequently with only two such dots. Hindwing with 3—8 usually double sub¬marginal spots. The markings are light yellow; the median band formed almost exactly as in G. ucalegon-, cell of the forewing with an apical spot and a streak at the hindmargin between veins 3 and 4; hindwing with two submarginal dots each in cellules 2—6 and with three large discal spots about in the middle of cellules 2–4, beneath red at the base.

== Subspecies ==
- Graphium fulleri fulleri (Cameroon, Congo)
- Graphium fulleri boulleti (Le Cerf, 1912) (Cameroon, Equatorial Guinea, Gabon, Congo, Democratic Republic of the Congo)

== Taxonomy ==
Graphium fulleri belongs to a species group with 16 members. All are very similar.fulleri is possibly a form of Graphium ucalegonides. The species group members are:

- Graphium abri Smith & Vane-Wright, 2001
- Graphium adamastor (Boisduval, 1836)
- Graphium agamedes (Westwood, 1842)
- Graphium almansor (Honrath, 1884)
- Graphium auriger (Butler, 1876)
- Graphium aurivilliusi (Seeldrayers, 1896)
- Graphium fulleri (Grose-Smith, 1883)
- Graphium hachei (Dewitz, 1881)
- Graphium kigoma Carcasson, 1964
- Graphium olbrechtsi Berger, 1950
- Graphium poggianus (Honrath, 1884)
- Graphium rileyi Berger, 1950
- Graphium schubotzi (Schultze, 1913)
- Graphium simoni (Aurivillius, 1899),
- Graphium ucalegon (Hewitson, 1865)[
- Graphium ucalegonides (Staudinger, 1884)

== Biogeographic realm ==
Afrotropical realm

== Images ==
External images from Royal Museum of Central Africa.
