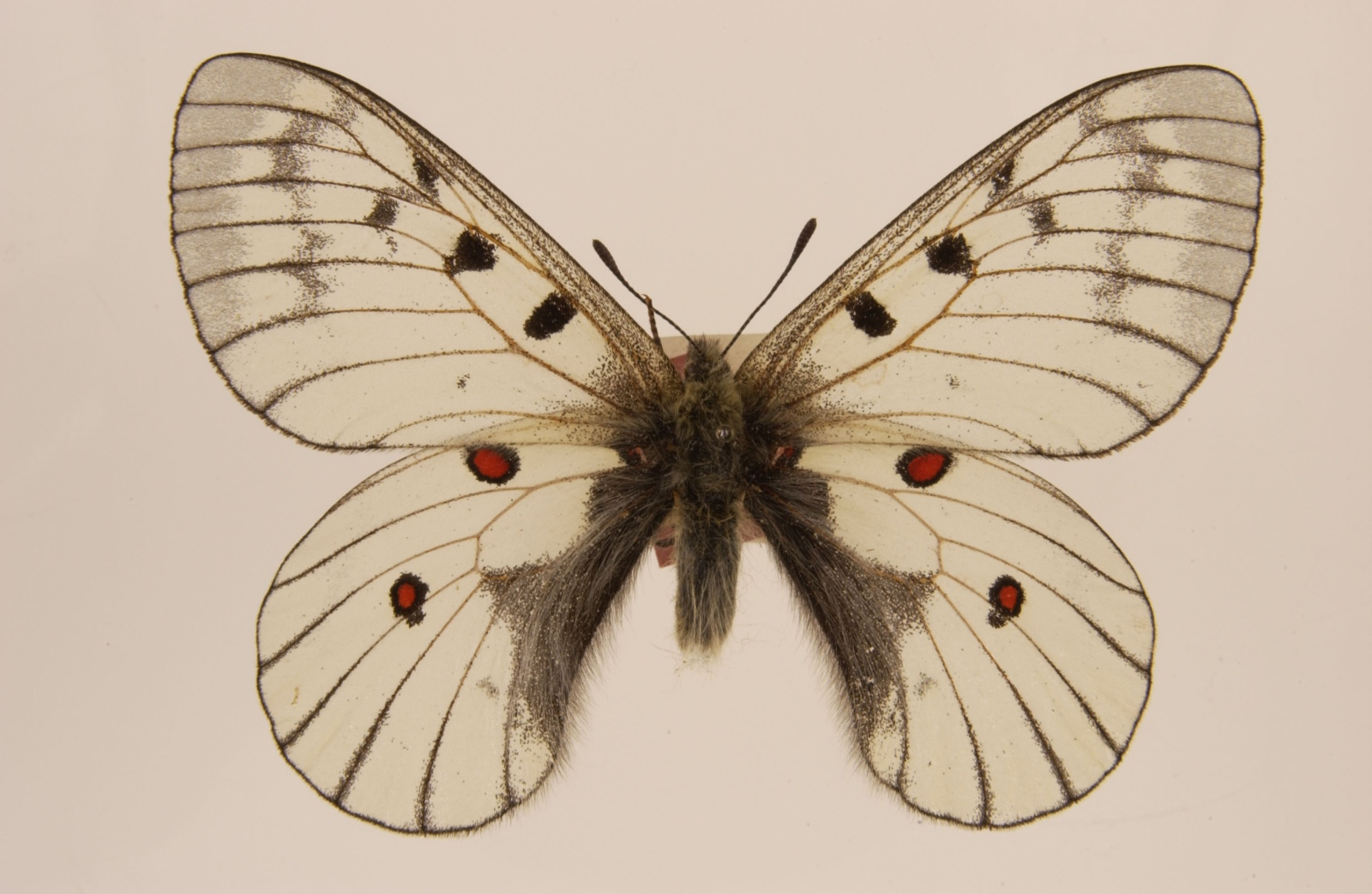
- A male specimen

Scientific classification
- Kingdom: Animalia
- Phylum: Arthropoda
- Class: Insecta
- Order: Lepidoptera
- Family: Papilionidae
- Genus: Parnassius
- Species: P. bremeri

Binomial name
- Parnassius bremeri Bremer, 1864

= Parnassius bremeri =

Species of butterfly

Parnassius bremeri is a high altitude butterfly which is found in Russia, Korea and China . It is a member of the snow Apollo genus (Parnassius) of the swallowtail family (Papilionidae). Over its vast range (Transbaikal, the Amur and Ussuri regions and the Kuriles), the species varies widely in morphology and many subspecies have been described.

P. bremeri is found in open landscapes on forest-steppe, as well as slopes with woodlands up to the alpine zone (1,500 m.). The flight period is May and June. Known host plants are: Sedum - Sedum clizoorl, S. ussuriensis, S. ishida and Orostachys malacophylla.

== Description ==
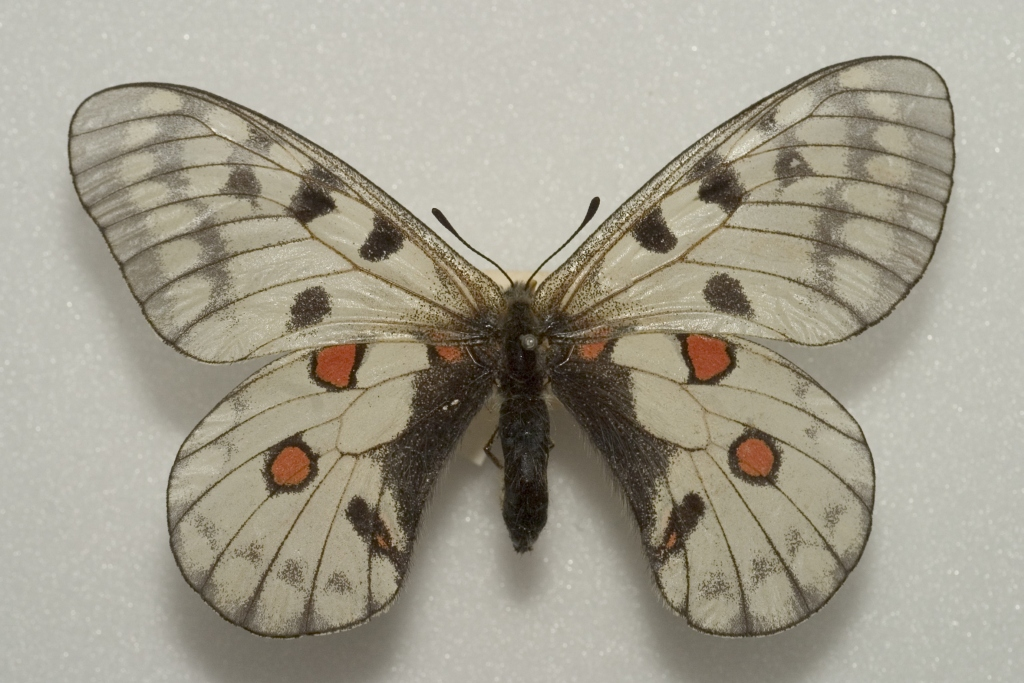
Specimen of a female from the Amur region

It is similar to Parnassius phoebus but smaller and with wing veins almost indistinct against the ground color. The hindwing has a red basal spot.

Note: The wing pattern in Parnassius species is inconsistent and the very many subspecies and forms make identification problematic and uncertain. Structural characters derived from the genitalia, wing venation, sphragis and foretibial epiphysis are more, but not entirely reliable. The description given here is a guide only. For an identification key see Ackery P.R. (1975).

White, with black veins. Forewing with two black elongate cell spots, two costal spots situated beyond the cell, a blackish submarginal band, often represented only by some vestiges, a narrow vitreous distal margin in apical portion of edge, and a blackish spot at the hind margin. Hindwing with two red ocelli bordered with black, the anterior one being usually the purer in colour and larger; further, the black abdominal area produced forward at apex of cell into a tooth-like projection; anal spots incomplete; a red spot at base above, while below there are four large red basal spots with blackish borders, and a continuous line of blackish, often obsolete, submarginal spots. Antenna blackish brown. Fringes of wings black, or partly whitish, especially on hindwing, a marginal line being black. Female rather larger than male, upperside more or less powdered with blackish scaling, the black markings intensified, ill-defined, anal spots of hindwing more distinctly marked, there being, moreover, a blackish, shadowy, submarginal band. Pouch small, leaf shaped, pointed, on the broad portion of its under surface a longitudinal carina.

== Subspecies ==
Partial list

- P. b. amgunensis Sheljuzhko, 1928 Lower Amur region
- P. b. bremeri (nominate)
- P. b. conjunctus Staudinger, 1901 Ussuri
- P. b. graeseri Honrath, 1885 Transbaikalia
- P. b. hakutozana Matsumura, 1927 Korea
- P. b. lumen Eisner, 1968 Andong, Korea
- P. b. nipponus Kreuzberg, 1992 Kunashir Island
- P. b. pakianus Murayama, 1964 South Korea
- P. b. orotschonica Bang-Haas, 1927 Sikhote-Alin
- P. b. solonensis Bang-Haas, 1927 Sichotin Alin Mountains
