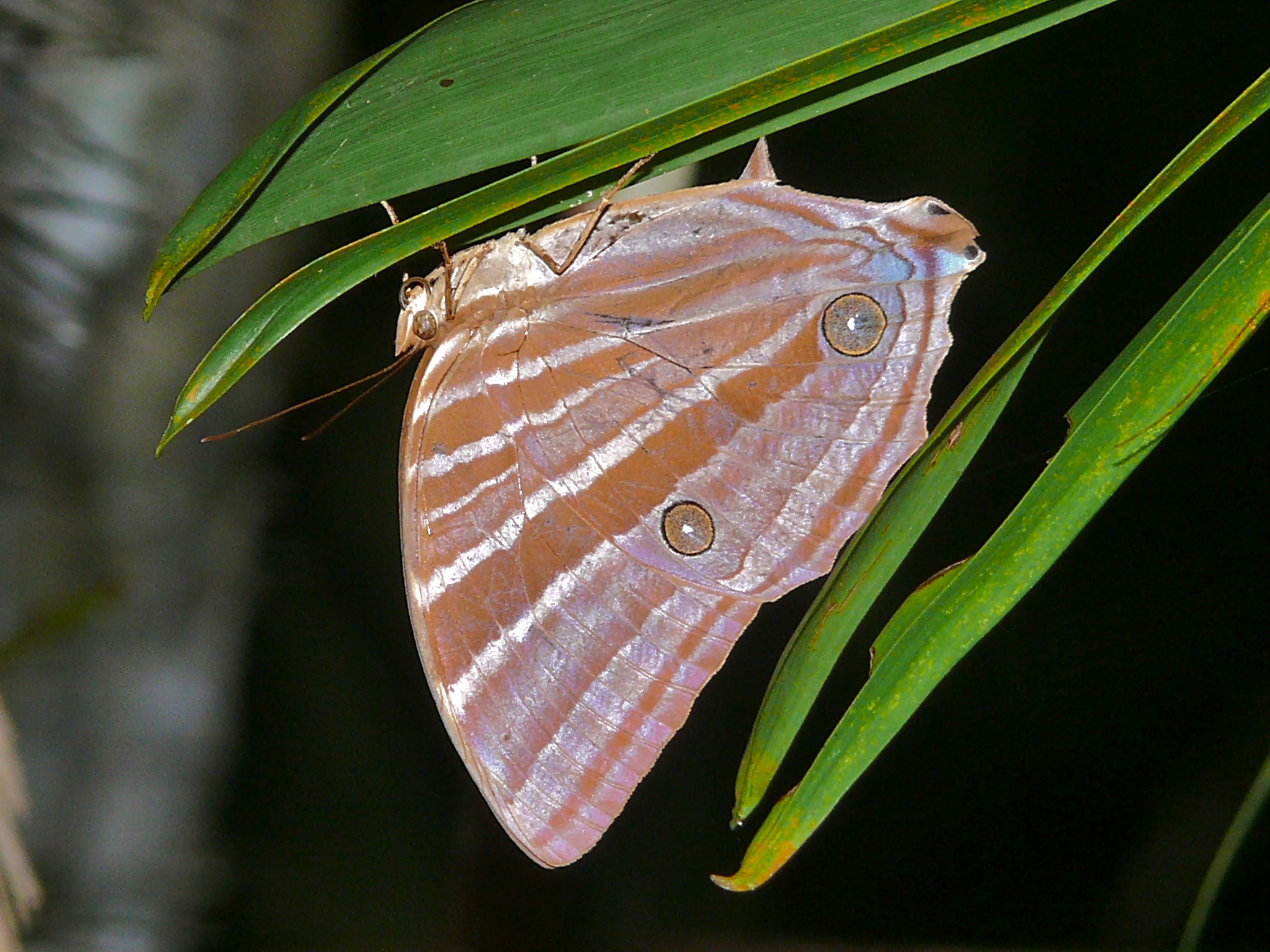

Scientific classification
- Kingdom: Animalia
- Phylum: Arthropoda
- Clade: Pancrustacea
- Class: Insecta
- Order: Lepidoptera
- Family: Nymphalidae
- Genus: Amathusia
- Species: A. phidippus

Binomial name
- Amathusia phidippus (Linnaeus, 1763)

= Amathusia phidippus =

Palmking

Species of butterfly

Amathusia phidippus, the palmking, is a butterfly found in India and Southeast Asia. It belongs to the Satyrinae, a subfamily of the brush-footed butterflies.

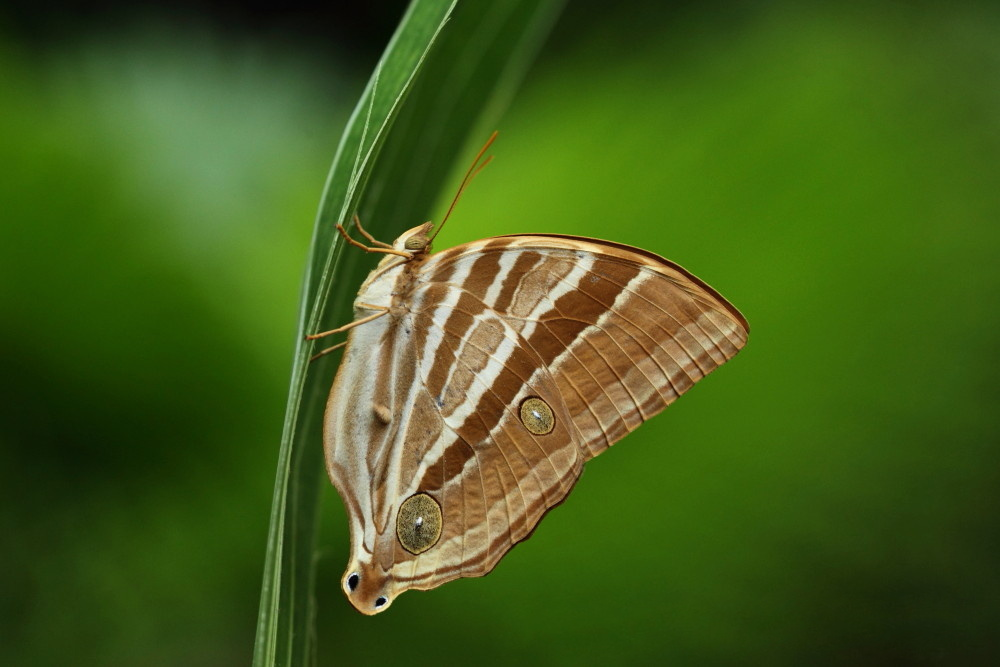
from Kerala

== Description ==
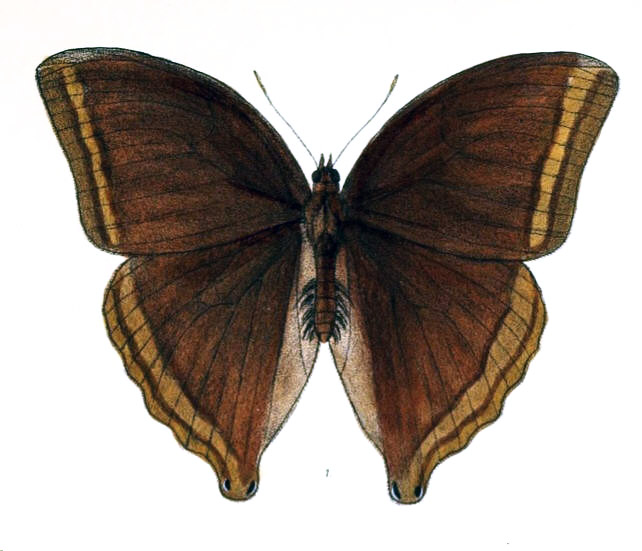

Male: Males are typically distinguished by their umber brown undersides. Forewing with the costal margin narrowly fulvous (reddish brown) near apex, crossing towards the termen, forming an obscure preapical band joining a subterminal lunular band of the same colour. Hindwing uniform, with a subterminal band as in the forewing but not lunular, straight. Undersides are commonly pale brown, with the following transverse pale lilac-white bands crossing both forewing and hindwing: basal, subbasal, discal, postdiscal, broad subterminal and terminal; the subbasal and discal of equal width, meeting above the tornal angle in V-shape, the space between the two bands with, on the forewing, two shorter similar bands crossing the cell, on the hindwing a single similar band from costa to median vein; subterminal band on hindwing bent upwards above tornal area and continued halfway up the dorsal margin, the broadly-produced tornus with a dark brown spot; finally a large ochraceous ocellus in interspace 2, and a smaller similar one in interspace 6. Antennae reddish; head, thorax and abdomen umber brown. Secondary sex-mark a glandular fold in membrane of wing shaded by tufts of long hair along vein 1 on upperside of hindwing, and preapically on the abdomen with tufts of stiff long hairs.

Female: Females typically possess upper and undersides similar to those of the male, but paler; on the upperside the fulvous along the costal margin widens into a preapical patch, and generally the bands on the underside show through and appear above as pale fulvous bands.

Wingspan: 112–122 mm.

Eggs: The freshly laid eggs are creamy white with a small black spot in the centre and a black circular ring. The eggs are laid in a row. At Thenmala, the observer saw two rows, the first having 15 eggs and the second 3 eggs. Prior to hatching, the colour of the egg changes to black. Eggs hatch in 6 to 7 days.

Larvae: The first instar larvae are cylindrical, measuring 0.6 to 0.8 mm in length. The second instar larvae are pale greenish yellow measuring 0.8 to 1.2 mm in length. The third instar larvae are morphologically very similar to the previous instar, but are longer (3 to 4 cm) and stouter. The fourth instar larvae are stouter and longer measuring 4.5 to 5.0 cm. During the fifth instar, the larvae become more brownish than greyish and measure 7.0 to 7.5 cm in length. Larvae of the palm king are voracious feeders. Most of the time, they remain on the underside of the leaf, eating from the tip of the leaf working towards the base. With regard to coloration, the fifth instars show marked difference in their ground colour: some being more brownish and some more greyish.

Pupa: The process of pupation takes about half a day and resulted in a greenish spindle-shaped pupa, well-camouflaged among the pointed leaves of the host plant. Initially, they are semi-transparent but later they become more opaque. The pupa has veins and lines similar to that of the leaves of the host plant, all veins ending at the pointed lower end of the pupa. The pupa becomes transparent on the eve of hatching, with the wings and head clearly visible. The hatching takes place on the 12th and 13th day of pupation.

Eclosion: All of the pupae hatched on two consecutive days between 8 a.m. and 9 a.m. The imago rested for about an hour and went on wings to rest in the shady bushes nearby.

== Distribution ==
This butterfly is widely distributed across parts of India, Myanmar, Indo China, Peninsular Malaysia and Thailand. It occurs in the Indonesian archipelago (Sundaland, Sulawesi. King island. Java, Bali, Sumatra. Nias. Bawean. Lombok. Natuna. Borneo. Palawan. Sulawesi and Banggai) and the Philippines (Bongao, Sanga Sanga, Tawitawi, Sibutu, Balabac, Negros, Mapun islands).

The palmking had been reported from Travancore (Kerala) in 1891 by Ferguson and has recently been rediscovered there by C. Susanth and his team (2007). Evans also reported the palmking to occur in "Bassein" Vasai-Virar, (Thane district, Maharashtra) but there have been no recent confirmed sightings there. It was George Mathew and Unni Krishnan Pulikkal who studied the life-stages, and photographically documented, for the first time in 2008.

== Ecology ==
According to Horsfield (quoted in Bingham), the caterpillars feed on coconut leaves. They are cylindrical, light brown above; fifth to anal segment with rows of short fine hairs, anterior segments and head with longer, anteriorly projecting hairs; the head with a pair of lateral palmated processes, anal segment with two backward-projecting setose processes. Colour light pinkish brown above, ochraceous beneath, dark brown lateral and dorsal lines, a black transverse band on third and fourth segments. (Frederic Moore cited in Bingham).

The pupa is green; head bifid, elongate boat-shaped (Moore cited in Bingham).

At least on Borneo but probably elsewhere too, adults like many Morphinae do not generally visit carrion or old fruit to drink liquids.
