= Eduard Honrath =

German lepidopterist (1837–1893)

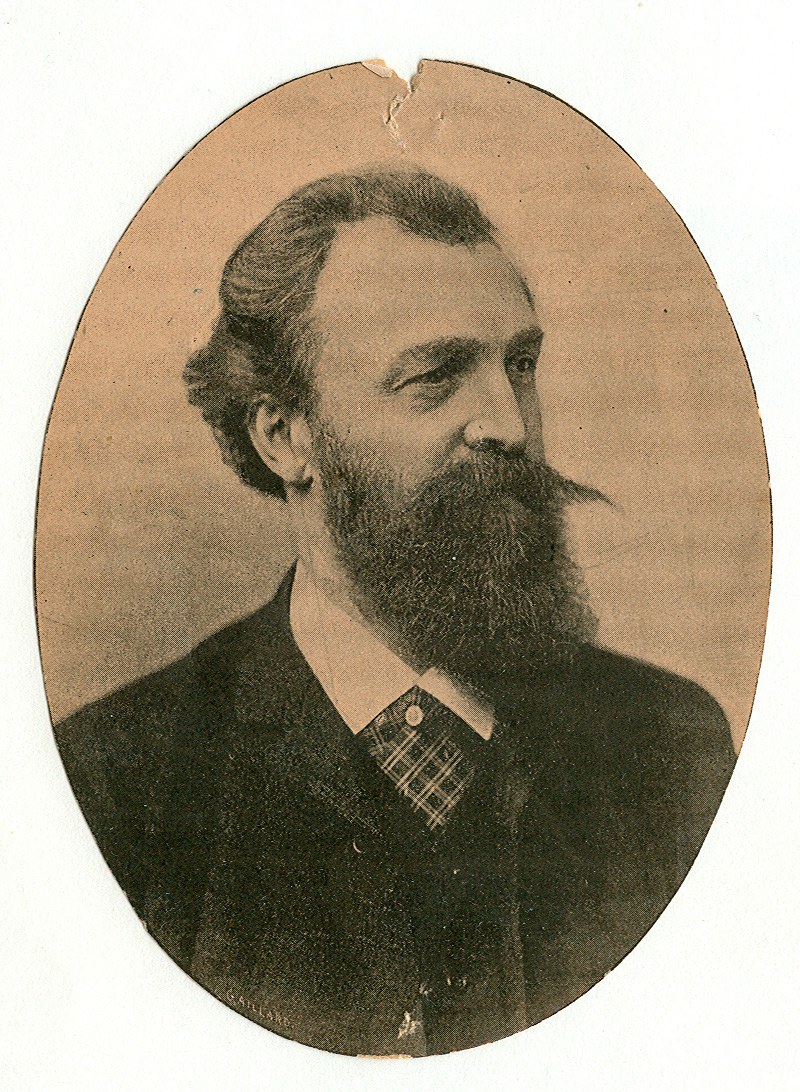
- Born: Eduard Gustav Honrath; 11 August 1837; Coblenz
- Died: 19 April 1893 (aged 55); Berlin
- Occupations: Entomologist, art dealer

Eduard Gustav Honrath (11 August 1837, in Coblenz – 19 April 1893, in Berlin) was a German entomologist who specialised in Lepidoptera, particularly Parnassius.

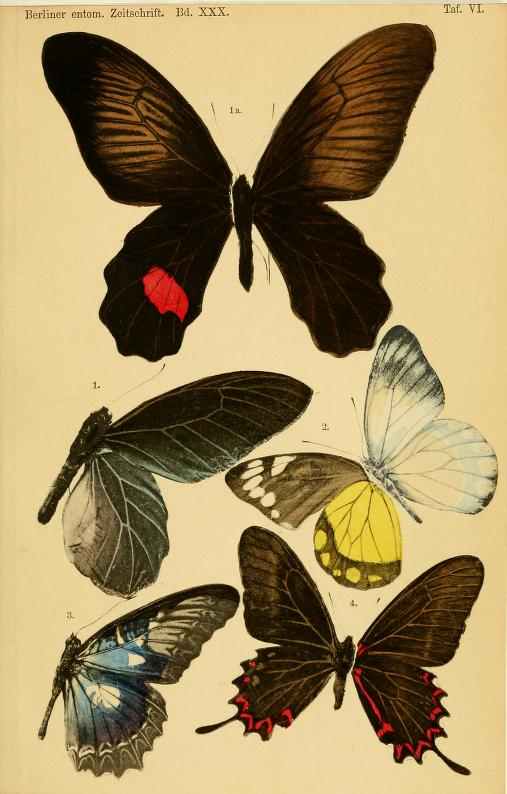
Butterfly illustrations by Eduard Honrath

Honrath was a well-known art dealer in Berlin. Among his entomological achievements, he described Parnassius graeseri (1885) (now Parnassius bremeri graeseri (a subspecies), Parnassius stenosemus and Papilio neumoegeni (both 1890) in the Berliner Entomologische Zeitschrift. He was a member of the Entomological Society of Berlin, and its president for many years.
