= Epameinondas (disambiguation) =

Epameinondas, Epaminonda or Epaminondas may refer to:

== People ==
=== Epaminondas ===
- Epaminondas
- Eduardo Epaminondas González Dubón
- Epaminonda Nicu
- W. Epaminondas Adrastus Blab
- Angelo Epaminonda
- Epaminondas Marias
- Epaminondas José de Araújo
- Epaminondas Pantelakis
- Epaminondas Brilha
- Epaminonda Bucevschi
- Epaminondas Korkoneas
- Haris Epaminonda
- Epaminondas Stassinopoulos
- Epaminondas Samartzidis
- Haris Epaminonda
- Amaury Epaminondas

=== Epameinondas ===
- Epameinondas Charisiadis
- Epameinondas Zymvrakakis
- Epameinondas Deligeorgis
- Epameinondas Kavvadias
- Epameinondas Thomopoulos
- Epameinondas Papantoniou
- Epameinondas Pentheroudakis

== Other ==
- Epaminondas (children's story)
- Epaminondas (game)
- Graphium epaminondas
- Kirinia epaminondas
- List of fiction set in ancient Greece#Epaminondas
