= Korçë uprising =

1914 Greek insurgent victory in Albania

Korçë Uprising
- Part of North Epirote Struggle
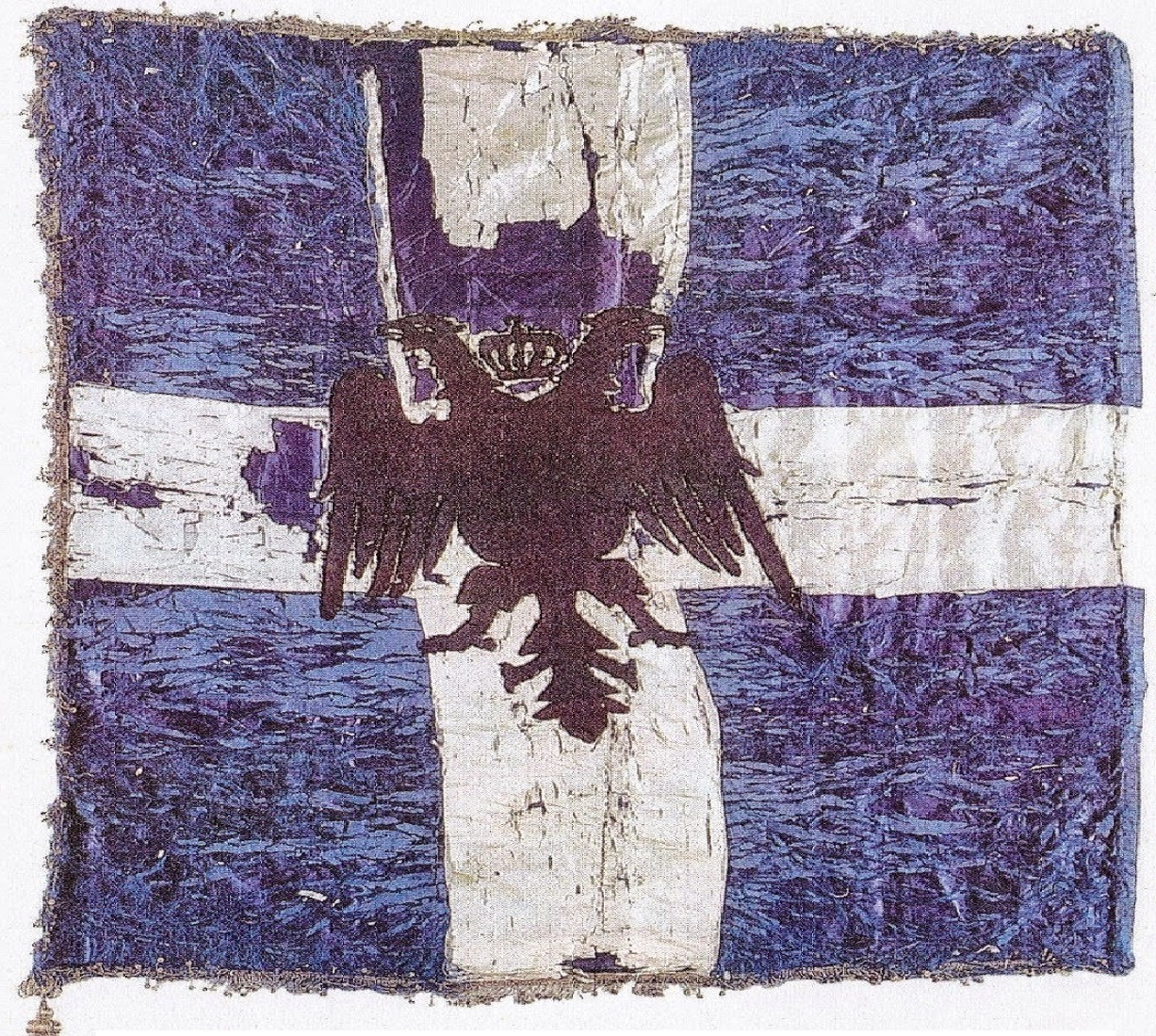
- The Northern Epirote flag raised at the metropolitan residence of Korçë on 22 March 1914 by insurgents.
Date	19 March–July 1914
Location	Korçë, Albania
Result	Greek insurgent victory: Greek insurgents retook Korçë in July 1914 during the wider North Epirote Struggle.

Belligerents
Principality of Albania	Northern Epirote insurgents

Commanders and leaders
Themistokli Gërmenji; Mustafa Bey; Abdul Bey	Georgios Soulios; Loukas Petrou; Andreas Papadakis; Georgios Germanos; Epameinondas Charisiadis; Captain Mavratzas; Nikos Thrakas; Stavros Samaras

Units involved
Albanian gendarmerie; Ottoman Army deserters; Gheg irregular bands; Armed Muslim village auxiliaries	Sacred Band of Korçë; Revolutionary Committee forces; Local armed civilian groups; Bilisht relief detachments; Artillery detachment (Mavratzas’s unit)

The Korçë uprising (March 19–23, 1914) took place during the Northern Epirus Struggle, a few days after the surrender of the city to the gendarmerie of the newly formed Albania. Already during the Balkan Wars (1912–1913) Korçë had come under the control of the Greek Army. But after a series of international treaties, it was awarded to the newly formed Albanian state, as was the rest of the Northern Epirus region. This decision caused reactions in the region, culminating in the declaration of the Autonomous Republic of Northern Epirus on February 17, 1914 (March 1 of the new calendar). A resistance movement was organized in Korçë and an uprising took place in the city with fierce street battles. The rebellion was finally put down in blood by the Albanian authorities. The Protocol of Corfu, in May of the same year, provided that Korçë would be an integral part of the autonomous region of Northern Epirus. Eventually the city came under the control of the Autonomous Republic of Northern Epirus the following July with the favorable outcome of the Northern Epirus War and the expulsion of the Albanian gendarmerie from the city.

== Pretext ==
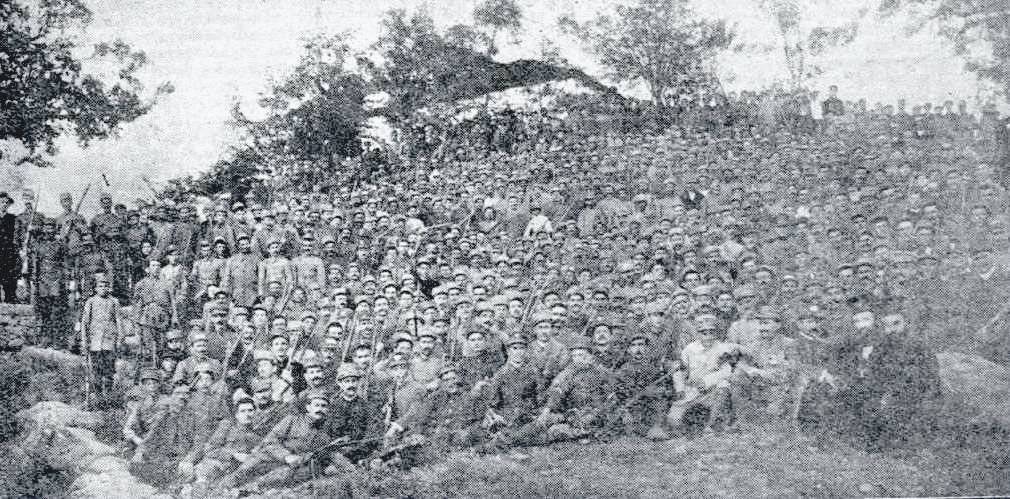
Members of the Sacred Battalion of Korçë on Saint Athanasius Hill, near the city of Korçë.

On December 7, 1912, during the Balkan Wars, the Greek Army entered Korçë after repelling Ottoman divisions. However, the initial enthusiasm soon faded, as it had already been determined that the region would be incorporated into the newly established Albanian state. Strong protests then emerged from the residents of Korçë, who did not wish to come under a Muslim political authority, much like the previous Ottoman one. Ultimately, the London Conference of Ambassadors that followed definitively awarded Korçë and the rest of Northern Epirus to Albania. Delegations of local leaders presented their case to the consuls of the Great Powers in Thessaloniki, while other local representatives met with King Constantine of Greece and members of the Greek government. Demonstrations were also held in Korçë, other towns of Northern Epirus, and various parts of Greece in opposition to this decision. At the same time, local organizations began forming national defense committees to ensure the region's security in the event that the Greek Army was forced to withdraw. One such organization was the "Sacred Band" of Korçë, which numbered around 7,000 members by the beginning of 1914.

The withdrawal of the Greek Army from Northern Epirus took place following intense pressure from the Great Powers and the delivery of an ultimatum on January 31. In an effort to calm the anger and opposition of the residents of Korçë, Colonel Alexander Kontoulis and Major General Anastasios Papoulas visited the city and offered general assurances regarding the safety of their lives and property. During those days, the major cities of Northern Epirus were formally declaring their intention to resist possible Albanian rule. At the same time, the Pan-Epirotic Assembly was held in Gjirokastër, bringing together representatives from all regions of Northern Epirus, including Korçë. It was there that the flag of Northern Epirus was raised, officially marking the beginning of the Northern Epirote struggle. On 17 February 1914, the Autonomous Republic of Northern Epirus was officially proclaimed, with Georgios Christakis-Zografos—a prominent local political figure and former Foreign Minister of Greece—as its leader. On that very day, Zografos sent a telegram to the people of Korçë, urging them to rise up in revolt. However, as early as 16 February, Korçë was being handed over to Albanian forces, composed primarily of deserters from the Ottoman Army and commanded by Dutch officers.

== Organization of the Uprising ==
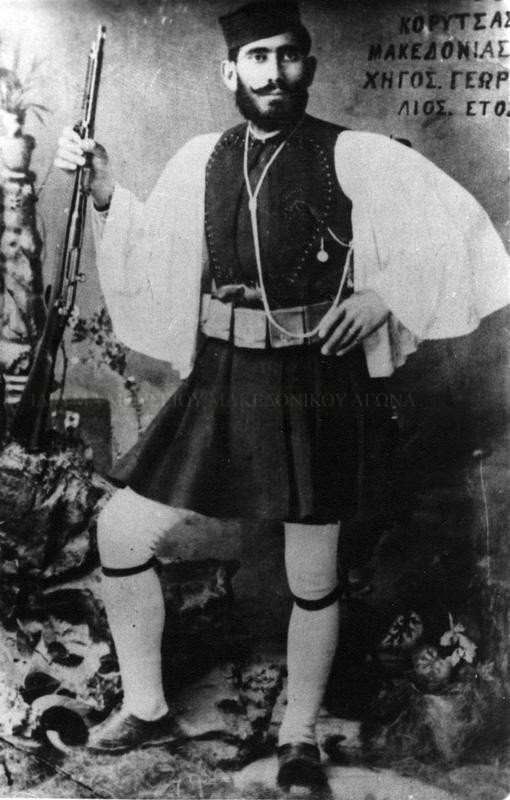
Georgios Soulios, a chieftain and one of the leaders of the uprising.

After Korçë came under Albanian control, a meeting was held between Metropolitan Germanos of Korçë, members of the city council of elders, and the Albanian governor, Mustafa Bey. Mustafa repeated a number of general assurances, stating that the rights of the Greeks would be respected, including the free use of the Greek language and the status of institutions under the jurisdiction of the Ecumenical Patriarchate. However, most positions in the local administration and gendarmerie were filled by Muslims, many of them the same individuals who had held those posts during Ottoman rule. The Albanian gendarmerie also included numerous deserters from the Ottoman Army. On 15 March, the administration of the city was assumed by Abdul Bey, another official who had previously served in the local administration during the Ottoman period. The Dutch Major Sneller was placed in charge of police affairs.

What followed was a campaign of open persecution against the Greek population, involving arrests, imprisonment, exile, and looting. Among the victims were schoolchildren, who were beaten in the streets and in their schools on the grounds that they spoke Greek. Students and teachers were also arrested and imprisoned.

A revolutionary committee was organized with the active participation of Metropolitan Germanos. Among the leading figures behind this initiative were Georgios Soulios and Loukas Petrou. At the same time, Dimitrios Kalfas and Petros Magkoletsis assumed responsibility for leading the Sacred Band of Korçë. Reports were circulating that Northern Epirote revolutionary forces were gradually assembling in the nearby town of Bilisht and would proceed from there toward Korçë to support the uprising that was about to break out.

== Outbreak ==
At midnight on the night of 19–20 March, the telegraph communications with the neighboring regions of Kolonjë and Pogradec, which were under Albanian control, were cut. The force led by Loukas Petrou destroyed the telegraph lines connecting the city with Ersekë in Kolonjë and approached Korçë from the west, intending to enter the city simultaneously with Soulios's force. Soulios's force assembled on the eastern outskirts of the city and established its temporary base in the cemetery. Before dawn, a detachment led by Andreas Samaras moved out from the cemetery and, after a brief exchange of gunfire with a patrol of the Albanian gendarmerie, captured the strategically important hill of Profitis Ilias.

his was followed by the rebels' advance into the city, with one detachment reaching the Church of the Life-Giving Spring (Zoodochos Pigi). There, the ringing of the church bells announced that the uprising had begun. The members of the Sacred Band of Korçë took to the streets and reinforced Soulios's forces. This entire development caused panic among the Albanian side. The Albanian gendarmerie became isolated in the government headquarters, while the governor of Korçë, Abdul Bey, and the commander of the Albanian gendarmerie, Themistokli Gërmenji, fled the city in alarm. At the same time, a group of revolutionaries led by Deacon Vasileios Gkionis arrested several Albanians who had displayed particularly harsh and abusive behavior toward the Greek population. Soulios then took the initiative and launched an assault on the enemy headquarters. The Albanian gendarmerie suffered two fatalities, and Sneller himself was wounded. However, Soulios was also injured and was forced to withdraw from the fighting. Command of the insurgent forces then passed to Andreas Papadakis.

The expected reinforcements for the insurgents failed to appear, neither from Bilisht nor from the forces of Loukas Petrou. On the Albanian side, before the end of the first day, Abdul Bey gathered villagers from neighboring Muslim villages and brought them into Korçë. As a result, the Albanians succeeded in securing control of the Muslim quarter and part of the city's marketplace. Meanwhile, in an effort to gain time, the Albanians—led by Abdul Bey and Gërmenji, who had by then returned to the city—sought a meeting with Metropolitan Germanos and came to the episcopal residence. Metropolitan Germanos made it clear to them that the systematic mistreatment of the Greek population was responsible for the course events had taken. In the end, a temporary truce was agreed upon. The insurgents believed that a temporary ceasefire would serve their interests by allowing them to gain valuable time until reinforcements arrived. However, the truce was broken by the Albanian side only two hours later, when Deacon Vasileios Gkionis was fatally shot in the courtyard of the Church of Saint George. As a result, hostilities resumed on a broader scale.

Meanwhile, news arrived that reinforcements from Bilisht would reach Korçë on 21 March, a development that greatly boosted the morale of the insurgents. On the other hand, the Albanian forces had already been reinforced by numerous groups of northern Albanian Ghegs, who were arriving in Korçë under the command of Dutch officers. Before sunset, the Dutch officers commanding the Albanian units sent a written message to Metropolitan Germanos through Abdul Bey, demanding the immediate surrender of the insurgents. The demand was promptly rejected.

== Climax of the Uprising ==
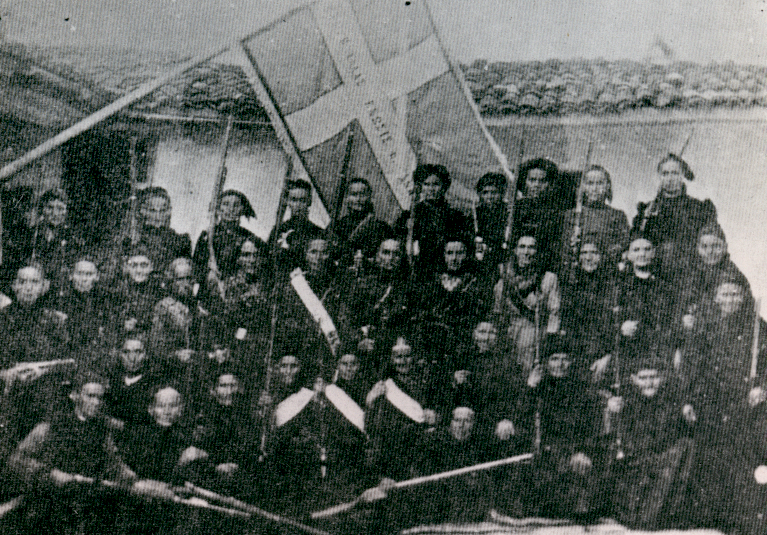
A women’s detachment of the Sacred Band of Korçë;women of the city were not exempt among the victims of the uprising.

As for the reinforcements from Bilisht, a small force led by the Korçë native Epameinondas Charisiadis had already set out on 19 March, but it was caught by surprise at Hoçisht by a force of 200 Albanians. Another detachment, commanded by Captain Mavratzas, departed the same day with approximately 150 men and headed toward the Hoçisht Pass. After overcoming several irregular Albanian bands, Mavratzas's men encountered scattered elements of Charisiadis's force. Following persistent efforts, they succeeded in breaking through strong Albanian resistance at the village of Grapsh and continued their advance toward Korçë. On the morning of 22 March, Mavratzas's men positioned two artillery pieces on the hill of Prophet Elijah, and a fierce engagement with Albanian forces followed. Shortly thereafter, a small group from Mavratzas's detachment succeeded in entering Korçë and joined up with the insurgents in the city. Amid the cheers of those present, the Northern Epirote flag was raised over the metropolitan residence by Stavros Samaras, in an atmosphere of widespread enthusiasm.

At the same time as Mavratzas's advance, another small volunteer force under the Aromanian (Vlach) chieftain Nikos Thrakas also succeeded in entering Korçë after several hours of successful fighting. Under the sustained pressure of the insurgents, the Albanian forces temporarily withdrew from the hill of Saint Athanasius, setting fire to the chapel of the same name as they retreated. However, the position of the rebels soon became extremely precarious, and the balance of forces shifted dramatically as large numbers of Gheg Albanians from the north continued to arrive in support of the Albanian side. In particular, the main force under Mavratzas, which held the hill of Prophet Elijah, came under a fierce assault by overwhelmingly superior enemy forces. During the fighting, Mavratzas and several of his non-commissioned officers were wounded. Ultimately, the forces of both Mavratzas and Thrakas were compelled to withdraw.

The insurgent inhabitants of Korçë continued the struggle, but on 23 March, once their ammunition was exhausted and hope for reinforcements had vanished, the gunfire ceased. Subsequently, the victorious Albanian forces set fire to the homes of the city's Christian population. Many fighters followed Papadakis and managed to escape. Those who were unable to do so were forced to surrender. However, several of the surrendered combatants were executed.

== Reprisals ==
The suppression of the uprising marked the beginning of a new wave of persecution. A large number of residents of Korçë, including individuals whose participation in the uprising could not be proven, were arrested. At the same time, irregular groups and particularly fanatical Muslims, reinforced by bands of Turk-Albanian Ghegs, carried out atrocities, including the killing of civilians. Women were not spared among the victims.

With the suppression of the uprising, the burial of the fallen Northern Epirotes, who had been scattered across the streets of the city, was also permitted. The recorded number of Northern Epirotes killed during the uprising was 114, including five women. The number of arrests carried out amounted to 600. The majority of the members of the city council of elders were also arrested, as was Metropolitan Germanos himself, who was regarded by the Dutch as the main instigator of the uprising. Arrests were extended even to the city’s priests, professors, and schoolteachers. The violence did not end with the deportation and imprisonment of those deemed responsible for the uprising. Many homes were looted, and cases of rape and other atrocities were reported. These scenes continued in the weeks that followed.

== Development of the Northern Epirote Struggle in Korçë ==
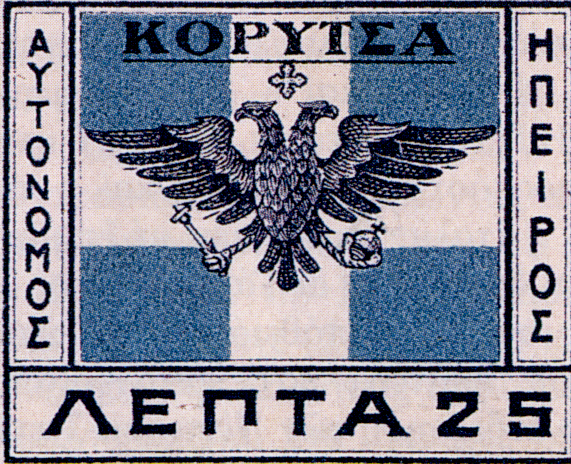
A postage stamp of the Autonomous Epirus featuring the Northern Epirote flag, issued in the city, bearing the inscription “Korçë”

The withdrawal of the Northern Epirote forces from the Korçë region continued in the following days. These developments caused concern among the inhabitants of the surrounding villages, and out of fear of possible atrocities by irregular Albanian groups, a large number of civilians moved to safer areas. However, Northern Epirote forces soon launched a counterattack. Led by Lieutenant Colonel Georgios Tsontos-Varda, Albanian units were routed at Nikolicë, south of Korçë, on 23–24 April 1914. By the end of June, the successive deadlines for the surrender of Korçë, as provided for in the Protocol of Corfu signed on 4 May, had expired. Georgios Christakis-Zografos ordered Tsontos-Varda to capture the city. Eventually, on 24 July, Korçë came under Northern Epirote control following a coordinated attack from the east and south of the city. Subsequently, Northern Epirote forces continued their advance as far as the Maliq bridge on the Devoll River, a point which was ultimately accepted by the Albanian government as the demarcation line between Albania and Northern Epirus.

== Aftermath ==
The reasons that contributed to the rebels’ failure were varied; however, all assessments converge on the spontaneous nature of the uprising. This spontaneity is also supported by the fact that the sense of national humiliation was immediately expressed among the local population, which hastily attempted to throw off Albanian rule that had been imposed only four weeks earlier. According to the views of certain official Greek circles of the time, the uprising served as the trigger for the complete persecution and the abolition of all rights of the Greeks of Korçë.
