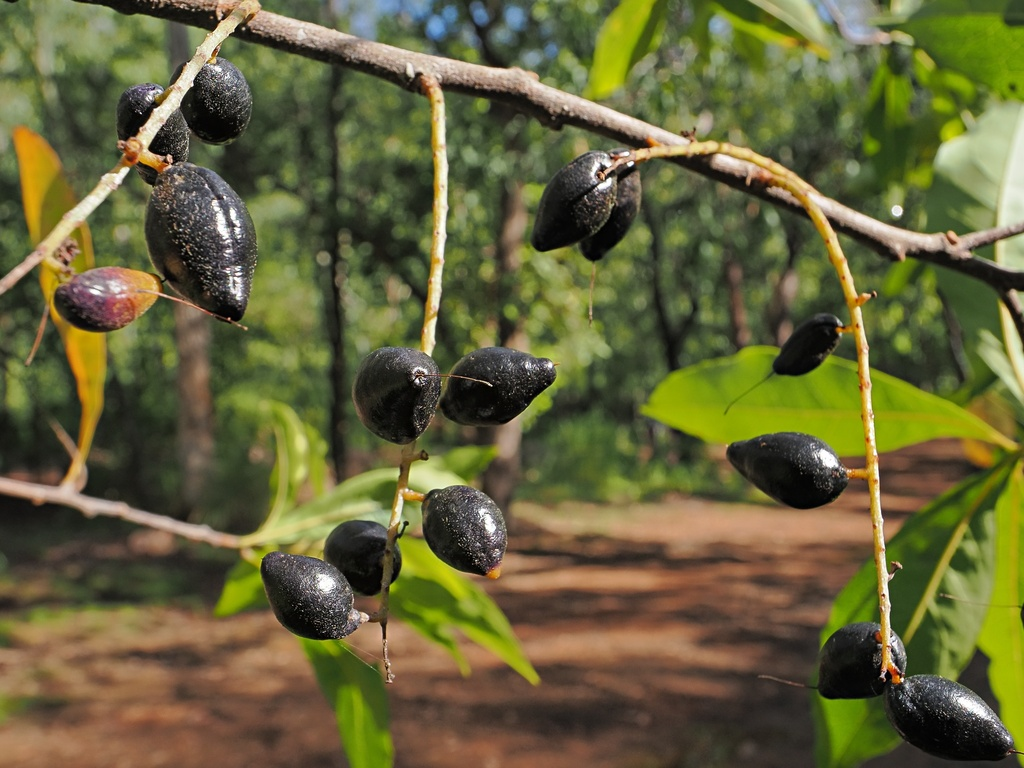

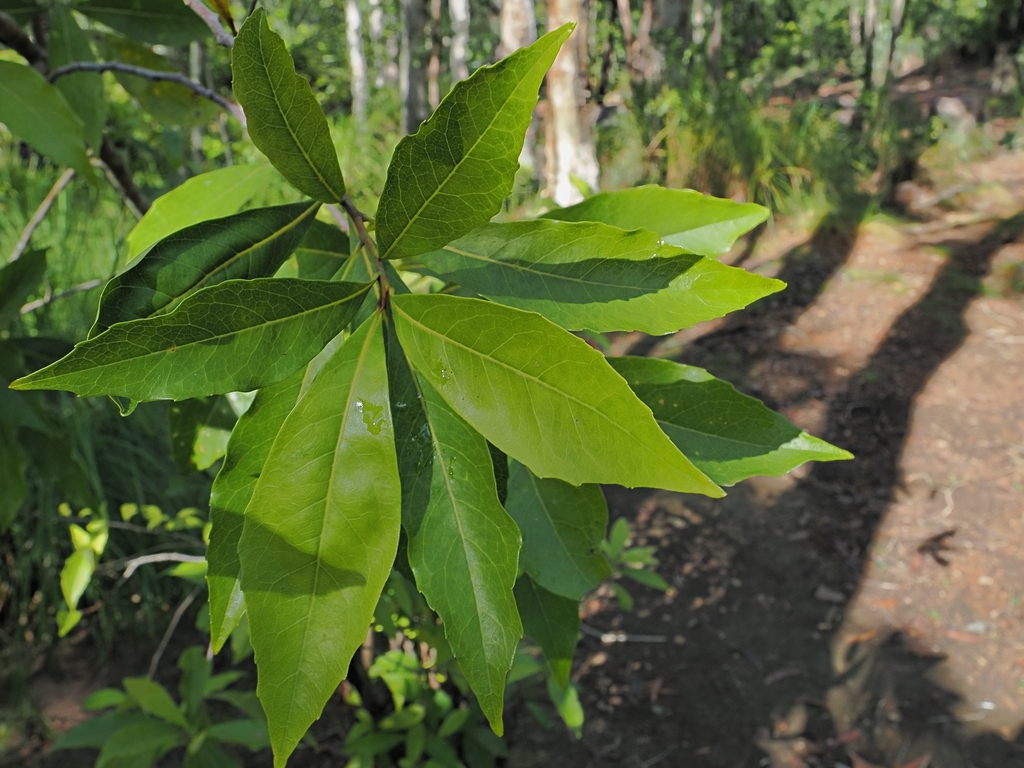

Conservation status
- Least Concern (IUCN 3.1)

Scientific classification
- Kingdom: Plantae
- Clade: Embryophytes
- Clade: Tracheophytes
- Clade: Spermatophytes
- Clade: Angiosperms
- Clade: Magnoliids
- Order: Magnoliales
- Family: Annonaceae
- Genus: Miliusa
- Species: M. brahei

Binomial name
- Miliusa brahei (F.Muell.) Jessup

= Miliusa brahei =

Species of tree

Miliusa brahei, the raspberry jelly plant, is a tree species in the Annonaceae family. It is endemic to Australia, where it is found in Western Australia, the Northern Territory and Queensland.

It was first described in 1874 as Saccopetalum brahei by Ferdinand von Mueller, and in 1986 was transferred to the genus, Miliusa, by Laurence Jessup.

== Description ==
It is a deciduous tree, with white broken bark, growing up to 20 m tall. Its young branches and shoots have a covering of shining pale brown hairs, and its flowers are either paired or solitary. It flowers from September to December, and fruits from November to May.

== Habitat ==
It is found in coastal and sub-coastal notophyll vine forests, and in monsoon vine forests.

== Ecology ==
It is a host plant of the butterflies Graphium agamemnon and Graphium aristeus.
