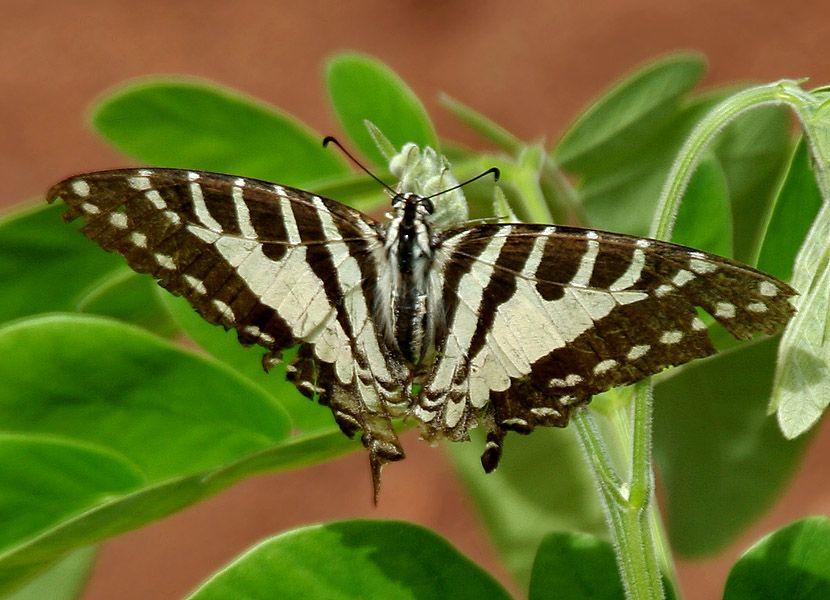

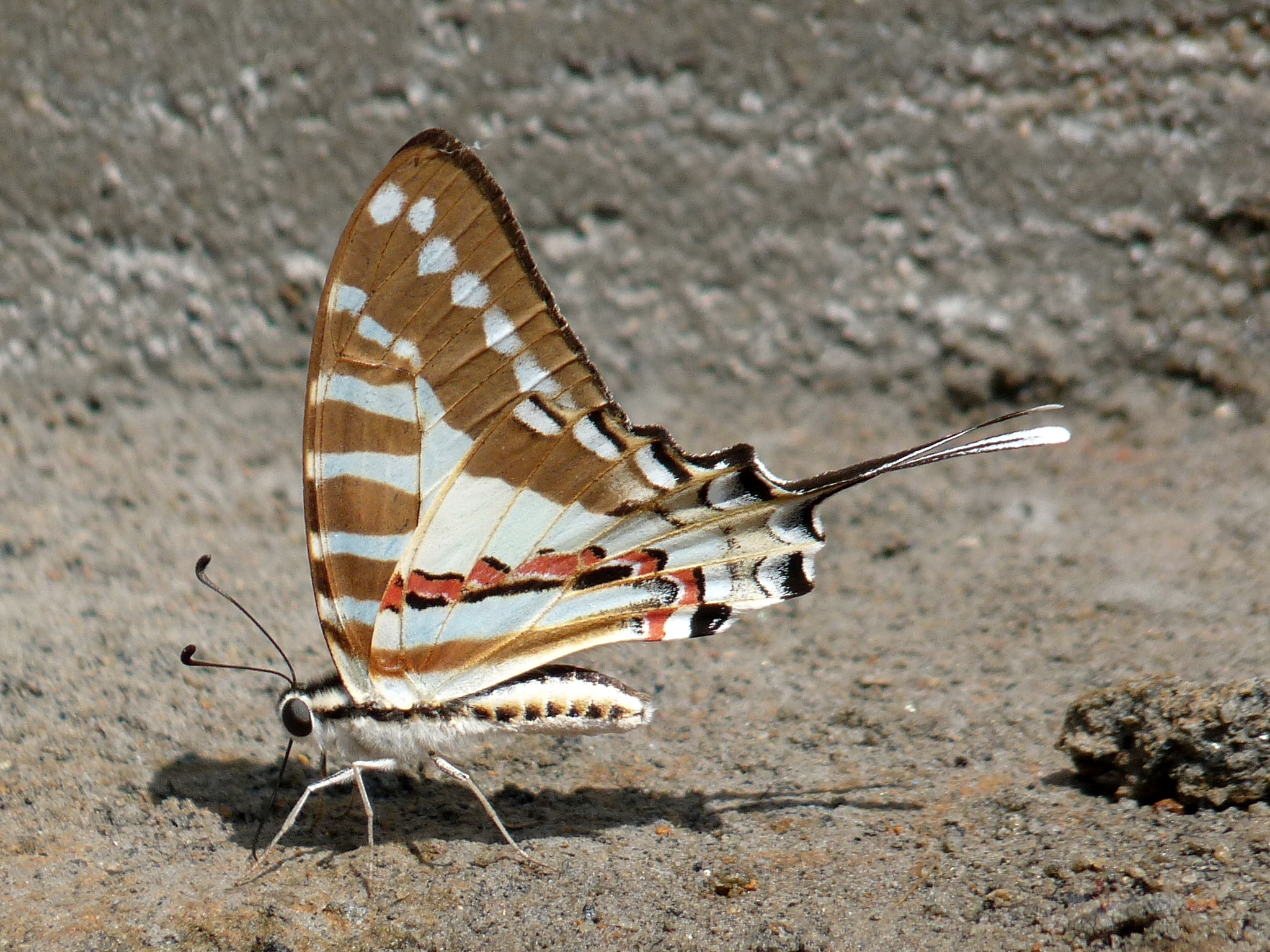

Scientific classification
- Kingdom: Animalia
- Phylum: Arthropoda
- Class: Insecta
- Order: Lepidoptera
- Family: Papilionidae
- Genus: Graphium
- Species: G. nomius

Binomial name
- Graphium nomius (Esper, 1793)

= Graphium nomius =

Spot swordtail

Species of butterfly

Graphium nomius, the spot swordtail, is a butterfly found in South and Southeast Asia that belongs to the swallowtail family. The species was first described by Eugenius Johann Christoph Esper in 1793. One of the grandest sights is a host of spot swordtails mud-puddling or swarming around a flowering forest tree.

The spot swordtail gets its name from the line of distinct white spots along the margin of its wings.

== Range ==
It is known from southern and eastern India (including Sikkim and Assam), Sri Lanka, Nepal, Bangladesh, Myanmar, Thailand, Vietnam, Laos and Kampuchea.

== Description ==
It differs from Graphium antiphates chiefly in the greater width of the black markings on the upperside, especially of the basal and subbasal bands that cross the forewing, both of which also extend to the dorsum. On the hindwing the black markings of the underside on the basal and discal areas are not only seen by transparency from below, but are actually represented, though only partially, by black scaling; the width of the dark grey terminal portion is also greater, and it has a tendency to turn to dusky black anteriorly, so that the sub-terminal series of black lunules are obscured anteriorly and are difficult to make out. Underside: markings similar to those of the typical form, but broader; forewing with the discal transverse band that reaches from costa to vein 1; hindwing: the black bands that cross the cell broader and proportionately closer together.

It has a 94–100 mm expanse. Males and females. Upperside bluish-white. Forewing: cell with five broad transverse black bands, the basal and subbasal bands produced to the dorsum, the medial band generally extended into interspace 2, the preapical ended on the median rein, and the fifth or apical from costa along the discocellulars extends on both sides of these and terminates at lower apex of cell; beyond the fifth band is a short macular transverse bar of the ground colour that terminates on vein 5, followed by a very broad black terminal band that occupies about one-third of the width of the wing and is traversed by a transverse subterminal series of rounded spots of the ground colour. Hindwing: ground colour along dorsum and above vein 7 whitish; a streak along the dorsum, a subbasal and an inner discal transverse band from costa across cell, and a very broad terminal band, black; the former two joined near the tornus by cross lunular black marks, the terminal band traversed by a series of slender lunules of the ground colour; a small black spot in interspace 1 above tornus and another at base of interspace 4; the black at the apices of interspaces 2 to 4 and the lunules of the ground colour thereon suffused with grey; tail black, edged and tipped with white. Underside white, the black markings very similar but of a bronze brown with the following exceptions: Forewing: extensions below the median vein of the basal, subbasal, and median transverse bands crossing the cell, and the inner portion below vein 4 of the terminal broad band, black: on the hindwing the inner discal band is broken, irregular and black, and is bordered by a series of red spots outwardly edged with black; the subterminal series of lunules of the ground colour are broadly edged on the outer side with black; the grey patch in the caudal region is replaced by ochraceous grey. Antennae black; head, thorax and abdomen creamy white, with a medial broad longitudinal stripe; beneath, the abdomen with lateral black stripes.

It has a wingspan of 68–95 mm.

== Status ==
This butterfly is fairly common and tends to be local. It is not known to be threatened.

== Habitat ==
Generally found in deciduous forest areas, among bushes with lesser secondary growth. Locally abundant below 3,000 feet (910 m) and less common above this level. Generally stays close to hilly and forested country.

== Habits ==
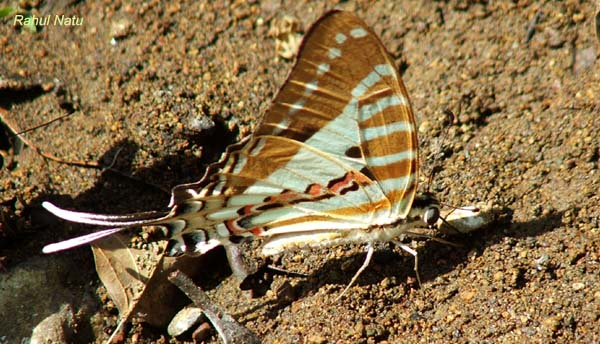
Spot swordtail seen mud-puddling at Yeoor, India

It is shy and wary. It flies close to the ground and has a dodgy and fast flight, especially when disturbed. They often visit flowers. Spot swordtails may be seen to cluster around flowering trees. They are fond of Gmelina arborea, a deciduous tree from dry areas. Large numbers can be seen settling on damp roads and wet patches, especially in hot summers. It basks close to the ground, with wings partially open or completely spread.

It is a known migrant in Sri Lanka.

== Life cycle ==
Individuals are active from February to June. They are most abundant in March–April. It has been recorded in western India from July onwards for a few months. In the Nilgiris it has been recorded from February to October.

=== Eggs ===
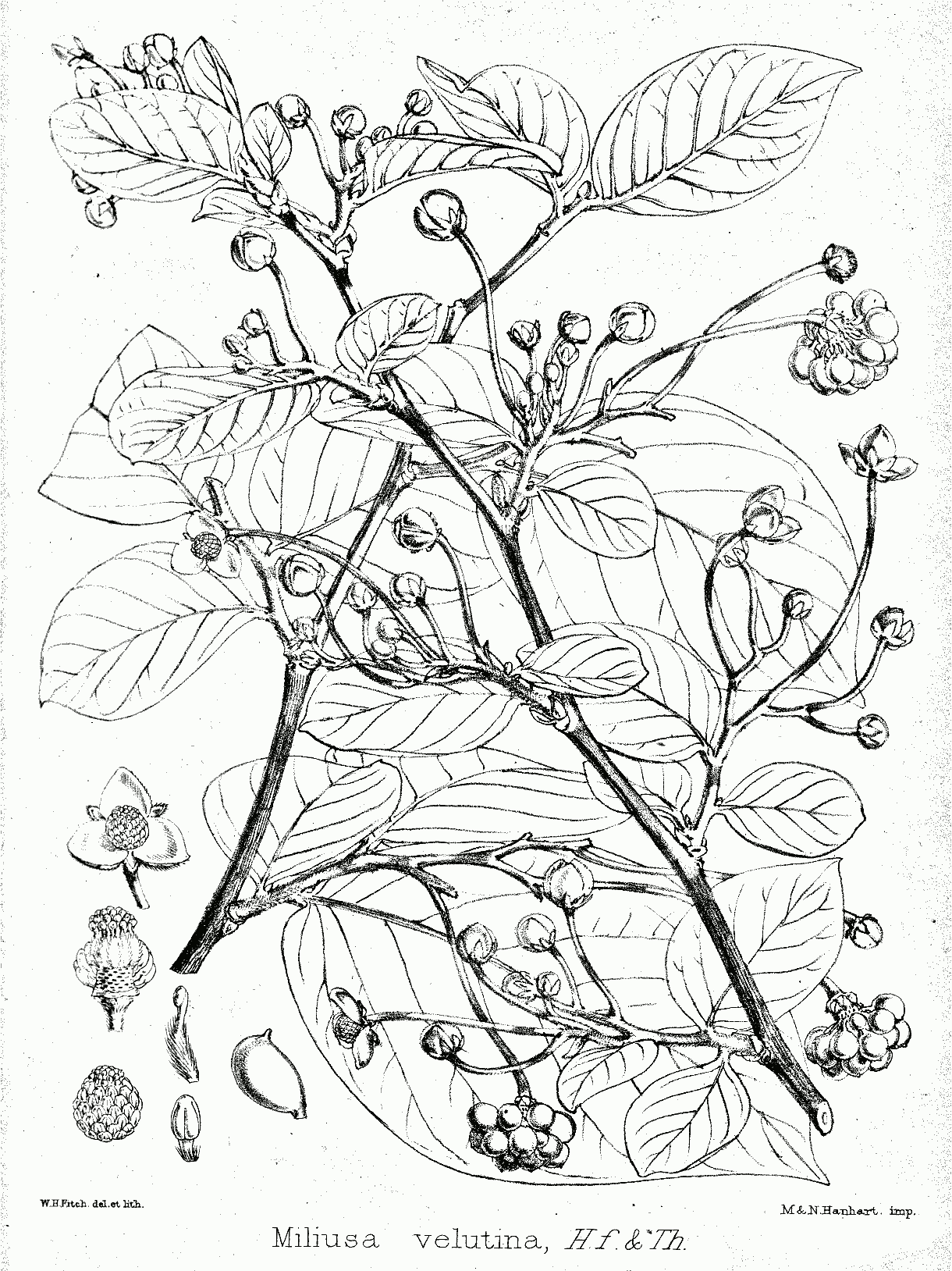
Miliusa velutina

Eggs are spherical, yellowish and slightly shiny. They are laid singly on the upper surface or at the margin on the underside of young leaves or buds.

=== Larva ===
The larva is black with a green underside. It has white transverse stripes. The anterior and posterior segments are yellowish. It has a pair of spines on each thoracic and anal segments. Glossy green osmeterium. It is a sluggish caterpillar which feeds mainly in the evening and at night.

"Not so thick proportionally at the fourth segment as those of agamemnon, sarpedon and doson, and is somewhat quadrangular. It has four pairs of spines which are small but sharp. The most usual colour......is black, banded on the sides with narrow white stripes, except on the first three or four segments and the last., on which there is more or less rusty red; but the shade varies very much, and in some the groundcolour is green." (Davidson and Aitken)

=== Pupa ===
Has the usual horn which characterizes this group, and also two short processes on the head, and is of some shade of earthy brown. It is attached by the tail and a close band and is not on the food plant but in crevices or under stones or roots.

== Food plants ==
The larval host plants are Miliusa tomentosum, Miliusa velutina and Polyalthia longifolia of the family Annonaceae. Miliusa tomentosum is a deciduous tree. The pupae of the previous year's brood emerge, seek mates and lay eggs just as the tree puts out new growth.

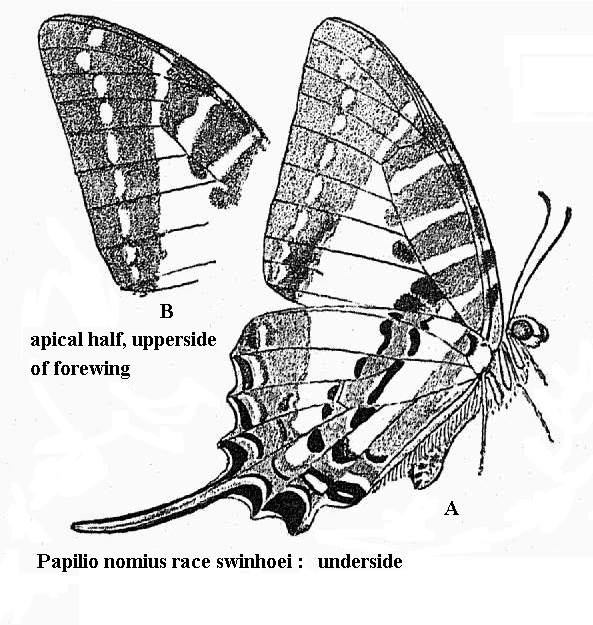
Spot swordtail illustration from Charles Thomas Bingham's Fauna of British India - Lepidoptera

== See also ==
- List of butterflies of India
- List of butterflies of India (Papilionidae)

== General reading ==
- Evans, W.H. (1932). The Identification of Indian Butterflies (2nd ed.). Mumbai, India: Bombay Natural History Society.
- Gay, Thomas; Kehimkar, Isaac David; Punetha, Jagdish Chandra (1992). Common Butterflies of India. Nature Guides. Bombay, India: World Wide Fund for Nature-India by Oxford University Press. ISBN 978-0195631647.
- Haribal, Meena (1992). The Butterflies of Sikkim Himalaya and Their Natural History. Gangtok, Sikkim, India: Sikkim Nature Conservation Foundation.
- Kunte, Krushnamegh (2000). Butterflies of Peninsular India. India, A Lifescape. Hyderabad, India: Universities Press. ISBN 978-8173713545.
- Wynter-Blyth, Mark Alexander (1957). Butterflies of the Indian Region. Bombay, India: Bombay Natural History Society. ISBN 978-8170192329.
