= Miliusa amplexicaulis =

Conservation status
- Vulnerable (IUCN 3.1)

Scientific classification
- Kingdom: Plantae
- Clade: Embryophytes
- Clade: Tracheophytes
- Clade: Spermatophytes
- Clade: Angiosperms
- Clade: Magnoliids
- Order: Magnoliales
- Family: Annonaceae
- Genus: Miliusa
- Species: M. amplexicaulis

Binomial name
- Miliusa amplexicaulis Ridl.

Species of tree

Miliusa amplexicaulis is a species of flowering plant in the family Annonaceae. It is a tree native to Peninsular Malaysia and Peninsular Thailand, where it grows in primary evergreen moist forest from 75 to 250 metres elevation.
