= Miliusa macrocarpa =

Conservation status
- Data Deficient (IUCN 3.1)

Scientific classification
- Kingdom: Plantae
- Clade: Embryophytes
- Clade: Tracheophytes
- Clade: Spermatophytes
- Clade: Angiosperms
- Clade: Magnoliids
- Order: Magnoliales
- Family: Annonaceae
- Genus: Miliusa
- Species: M. macrocarpa

Binomial name
- Miliusa macrocarpa Hook.f. & Thomson

Species of flowering plant

Miliusa macrocarpa is a species of flowering plant in the family Annonaceae. It is a tree native to Nepal, northeastern India, and Myanmar.
