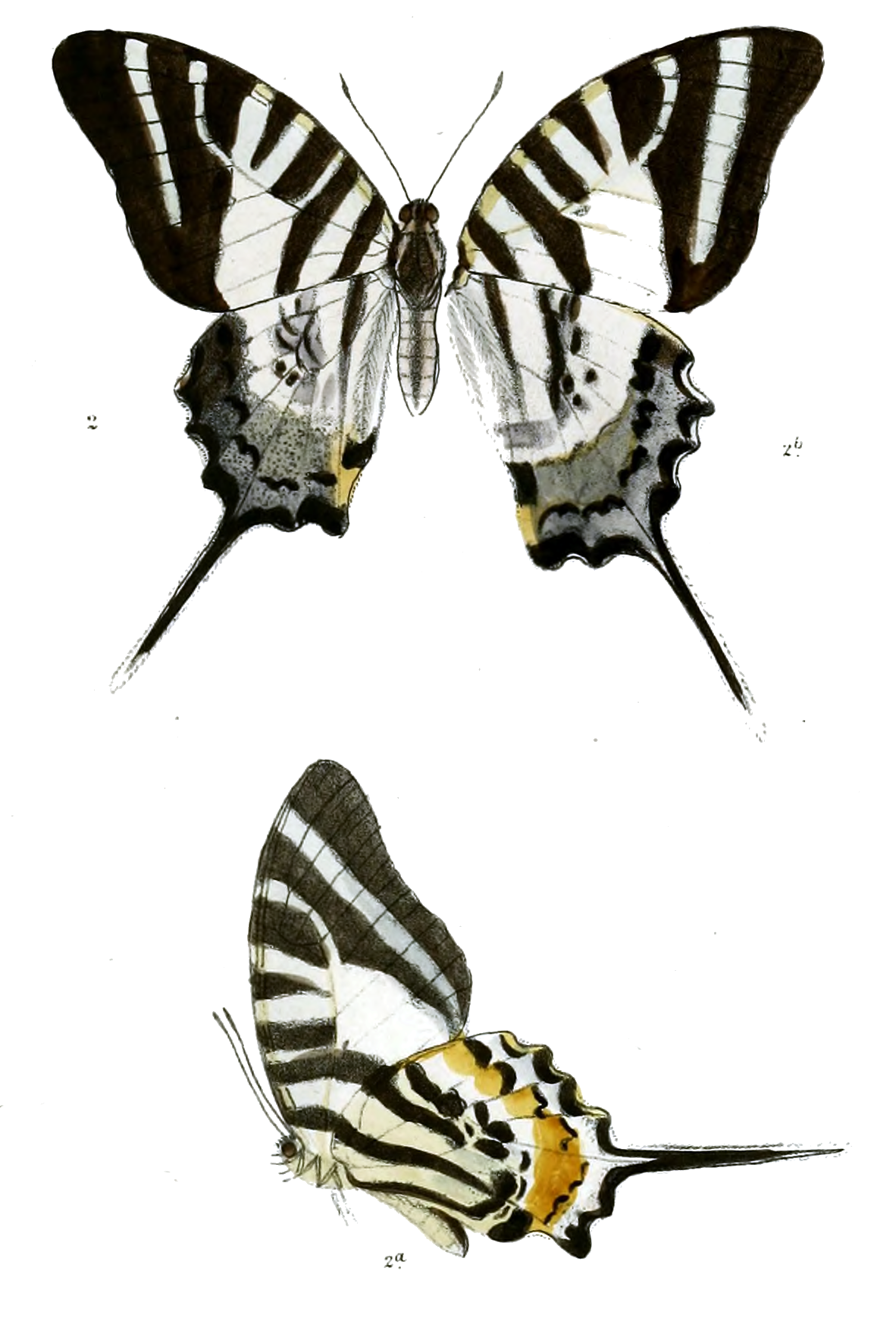

Conservation status
- Vulnerable (IUCN 2.3)

Scientific classification
- Kingdom: Animalia
- Phylum: Arthropoda
- Clade: Pancrustacea
- Class: Insecta
- Order: Lepidoptera
- Family: Papilionidae
- Genus: Graphium
- Species: G. epaminondas

Binomial name
- Graphium epaminondas Oberthür, 1879

= Graphium epaminondas =

Andaman swordtail

Species of butterfly

Graphium epaminondas, the Andaman swordtail, is a beautiful butterfly found in India that belongs to the swallowtail family. It was earlier considered a subspecies of fivebar swordtail (Graphium antiphates) but has now been identified as a separate species.

== Range ==
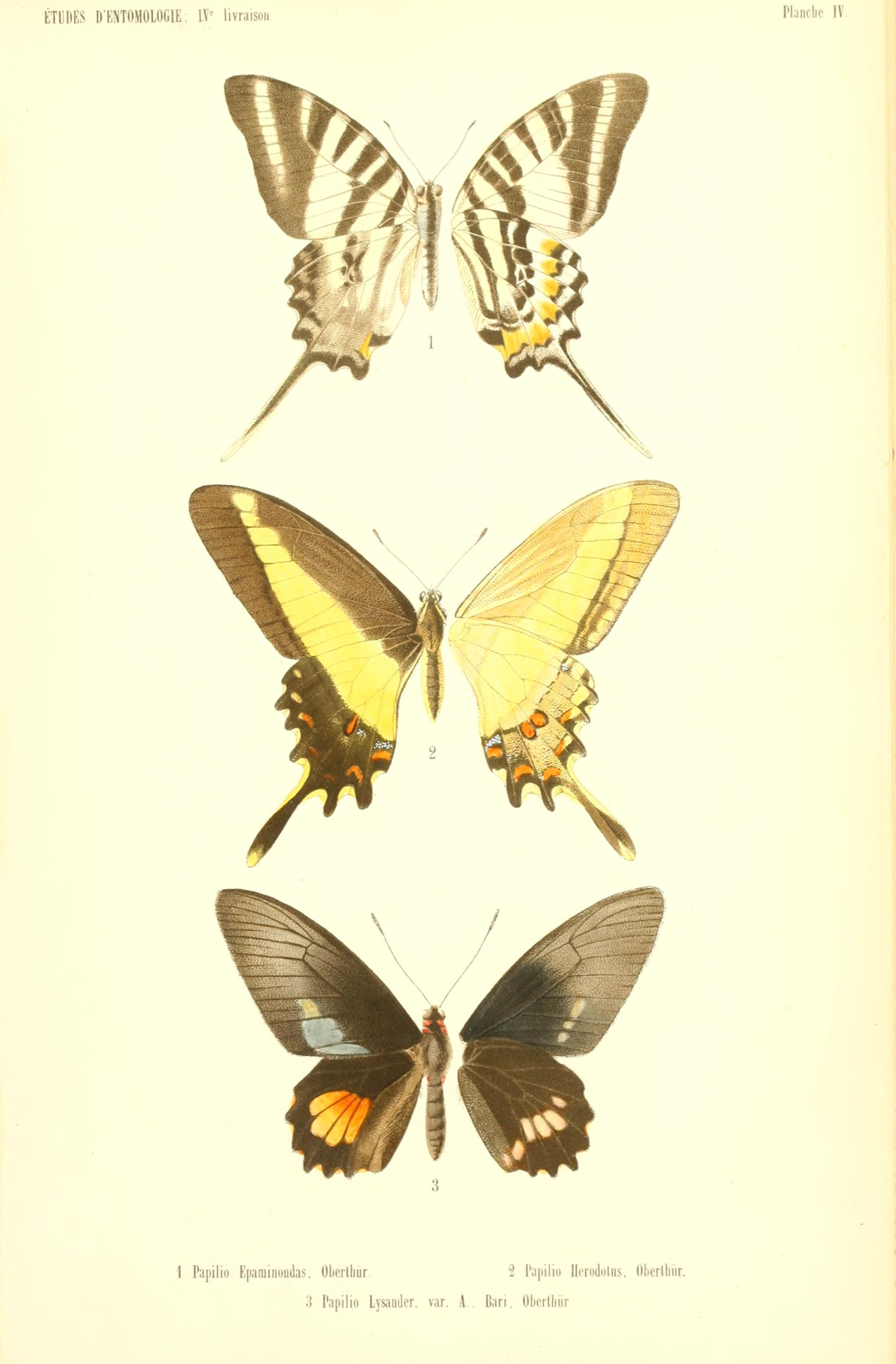
Plate accompanying Oberthür's 1879 description

Though endemic to the Andaman Islands of India, its distribution is insufficiently known. It has been seen in good numbers in Mount Harriet National Park and other locations in the Andamans.

== Description ==
It differs from Graphium antiphates chiefly in the greater width of the black markings on the upperside, especially of the basal and subbasal bands that cross the forewing, both of which also extend to the dorsum. On the hindwing the black markings of the underside on the basal and discal areas are not only seen by transparency from below, but are actually represented, though only partially, by black scaling; the width of the dark grey terminal portion is also greater, and it has a tendency to turn to dusky black anteriorly, so that the sub-terminal series of black lunules are obscured anteriorly and are difficult to make out. Underside: markings similar to those of the typical form, but broader; forewing with the discal transverse band that reaches from costa to vein 1; hindwing: the black bands that cross the cell broader and proportionately closer together.

Has a 94–100 mm expanse.

== Status ==
Insufficiently known.

== Etymology ==
Named in the classical tradition to honour the Theban general Epaminondas.

== See also ==
- Papilionidae
- List of butterflies of India
- List of butterflies of India (Papilionidae)

== General reading ==
- Collins, N. Mark; Morris, Michael G. (1985). Threatened Swallowtail Butterflies of the World: The IUCN Red Data Book. Gland & Cambridge: IUCN. ISBN 978-2-88032-603-6 – via Biodiversity Heritage Library.
- Evans, W.H. (1932). The Identification of Indian Butterflies (2nd ed.). Mumbai, India: Bombay Natural History Society.
