= Miliusa wightiana =

Scientific classification
- Kingdom: Plantae
- Clade: Tracheophytes
- Clade: Angiosperms
- Clade: Magnoliids
- Order: Magnoliales
- Family: Annonaceae
- Genus: Miliusa
- Species: M. wightiana

Binomial name
- Miliusa wightiana Hook.f. & Thomson

Species of plant

Miliusa wightiana is a flowering plant belonging to the family Annonaceae, endemic to the Western Ghats.

== Phenology ==
The plant flowers and fruits from September to December.
