= Qendër Bulgarec =

- Administrative unit
- Location within Albania
- Coordinates: 40°39′N 20°45′E
- Country: Albania
- County: Korçë
- Municipality: Korçë

Population (2011)
  - Administrative unit: 9,022
- Time zone: UTC+1 (CET)
  - Summer (DST): UTC+2 (CEST)
- Postal Code: 7013

Qendër Bulgarec is a former municipality in the Korçë County, southeastern Albania. At the 2015 local government reform it became a subdivision of the municipality Korçë. The population at the 2011 census was 9,022. The municipal unit consists of the villages Bulgarec, Lumalas, Biranj, Melçan, Porodinë, Dishnicë, Shamoll, Belorta, Kuç i Zi, Barç, Çiflig, Malavec and Neviçisht.

== Notable people ==
- Georgios Soulios, Greek guerilla fighter
