= Miliusa parviflora =

Conservation status
- Vulnerable (IUCN 3.1)

Scientific classification
- Kingdom: Plantae
- Clade: Embryophytes
- Clade: Tracheophytes
- Clade: Spermatophytes
- Clade: Angiosperms
- Clade: Magnoliids
- Order: Magnoliales
- Family: Annonaceae
- Genus: Miliusa
- Species: M. parviflora

Binomial name
- Miliusa parviflora Ridl.

Synonyms
- Miliusa jainii Goel & S.C.Sharma; Miliusa mukerjeeana Debika Mitra & Chakr.

Species of flowering plant

Miliusa parviflora is a species of flowering plant in the family Annonaceae. It is a tree native to the Andaman Islands, Nicobar Islands, Laos, Thailand, Peninsular Malaysia, and Sumatra. It is threatened by habitat loss.
