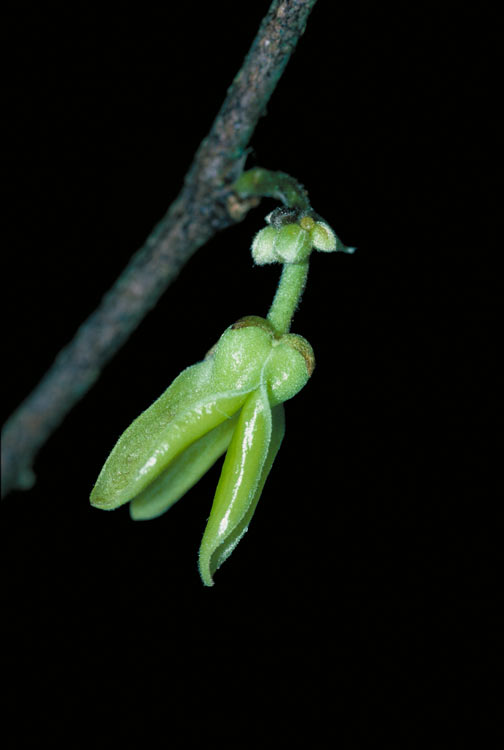
- Flower

Conservation status
- Least Concern (IUCN 3.1)

Scientific classification
- Kingdom: Plantae
- Clade: Tracheophytes
- Clade: Angiosperms
- Clade: Magnoliids
- Order: Magnoliales
- Family: Annonaceae
- Genus: Miliusa
- Species: M. traceyi

Binomial name
- Miliusa traceyi Jessup

= Miliusa traceyi =

Species of flowering plant

Miliusa traceyi is a species of plants in the custard apple family Annonaceae. It is a tree growing up to 12 m (39 ft) tall, native to the Northern Territory and Queensland, Australia. It was first described by Australian botanist Laurence W. Jessup in 1988. It inhabits semi-evergreen vine forests, usually along water courses and on granite soils.

== Conservation ==
As of April 2025, this species has been assessed to be of least concern by the International Union for Conservation of Nature (IUCN) and by the Queensland Government under its Nature Conservation Act.
