= Miliusa indica =

Conservation status
- Least Concern (IUCN 3.1)

Scientific classification
- Kingdom: Plantae
- Clade: Embryophytes
- Clade: Tracheophytes
- Clade: Spermatophytes
- Clade: Angiosperms
- Clade: Magnoliids
- Order: Magnoliales
- Family: Annonaceae
- Genus: Miliusa
- Species: M. indica

Binomial name
- Miliusa indica Lesch. ex A.DC.

Synonyms
- Miliusa eriocarpa Dunn; Miliusa indica var. tomentosa (Thwaites) Hook.f. & Thomson; Miliusa leschenaultii A.DC.; Miliusa montana var. tomentosa Thwaites; Uvaria ciliata B.Heyne ex Wight & Arn.

Species of flowering plant

Miliusa indica is a species of flowering plant in the family Annonaceae. It is a shrub or tree native to the Western Ghats of southwestern India and to Sri Lanka.
