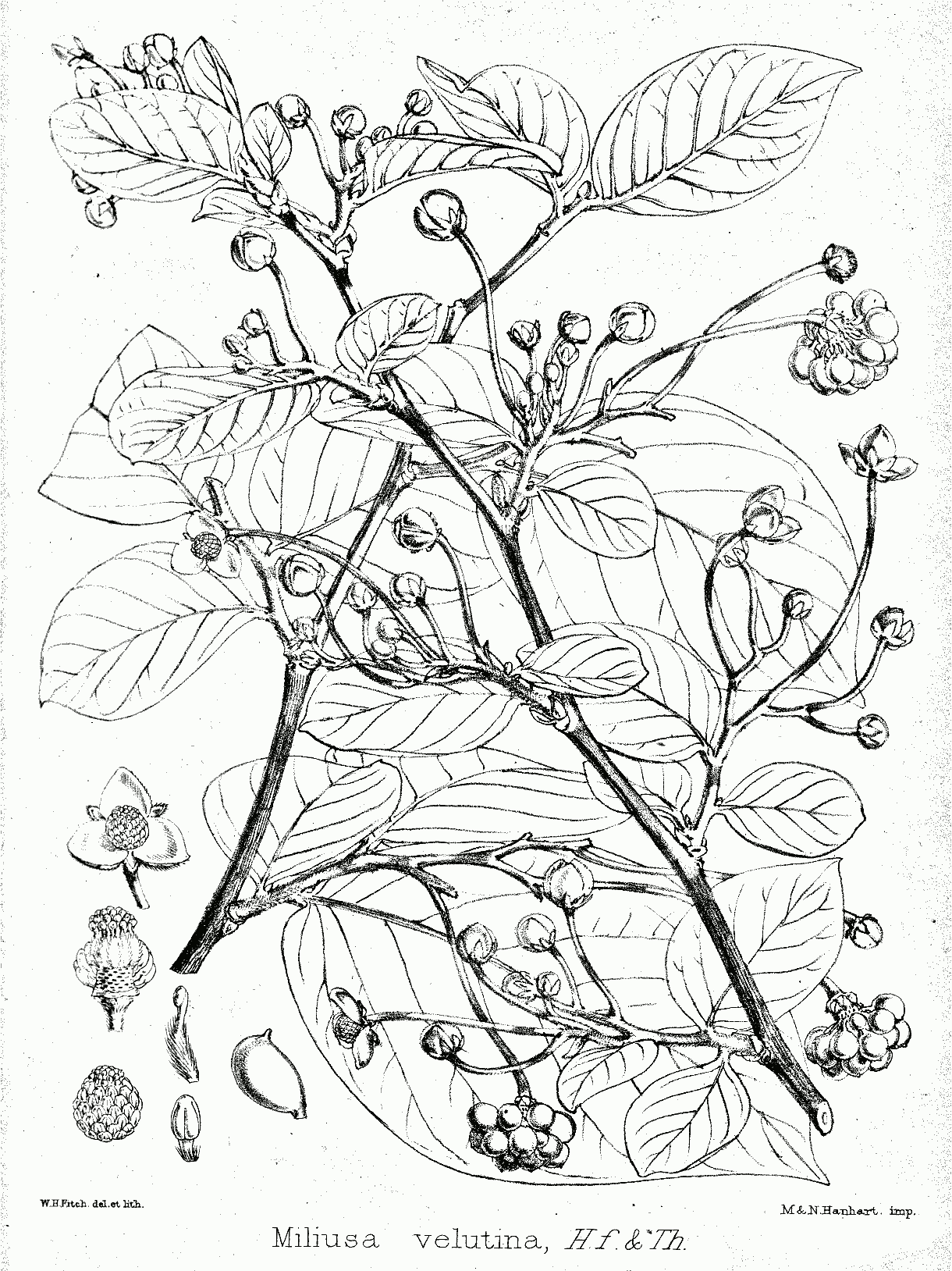
- Miliusa velutina

Scientific classification
- Kingdom: Plantae
- Clade: Embryophytes
- Clade: Tracheophytes
- Clade: Spermatophytes
- Clade: Angiosperms
- Clade: Magnoliids
- Order: Magnoliales
- Family: Annonaceae
- Subfamily: Malmeoideae
- Tribe: Miliuseae
- Genus: Miliusa; Lesch. ex A.DC.

Type species
- Miliusa indica Lesch. ex A.DC.

Synonyms
- Hyalostemma Wall. ex Meisn.; Saccopetalum Benn.

= Miliusa =

Genus of flowering plants

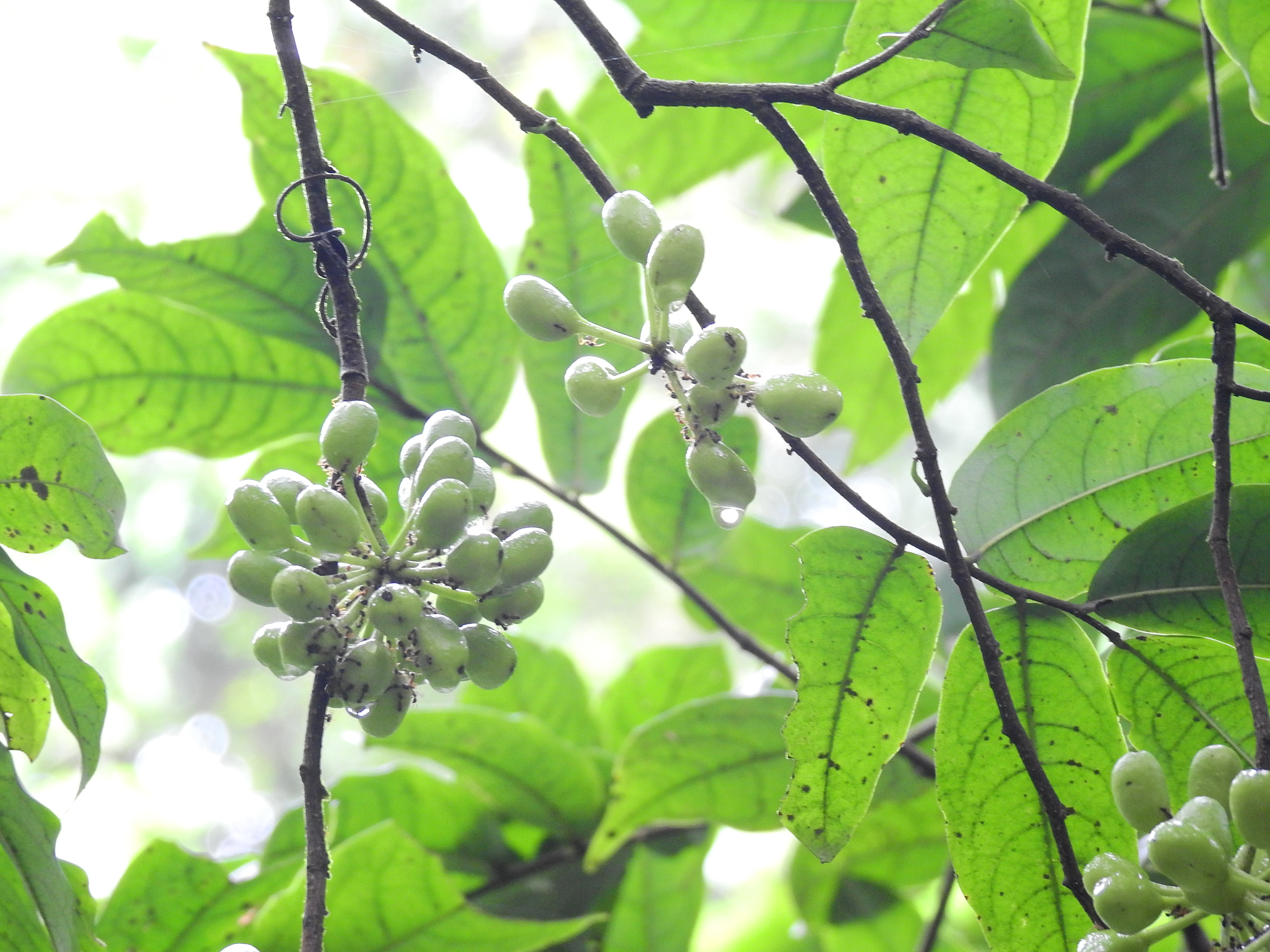
Miliusa dioeca

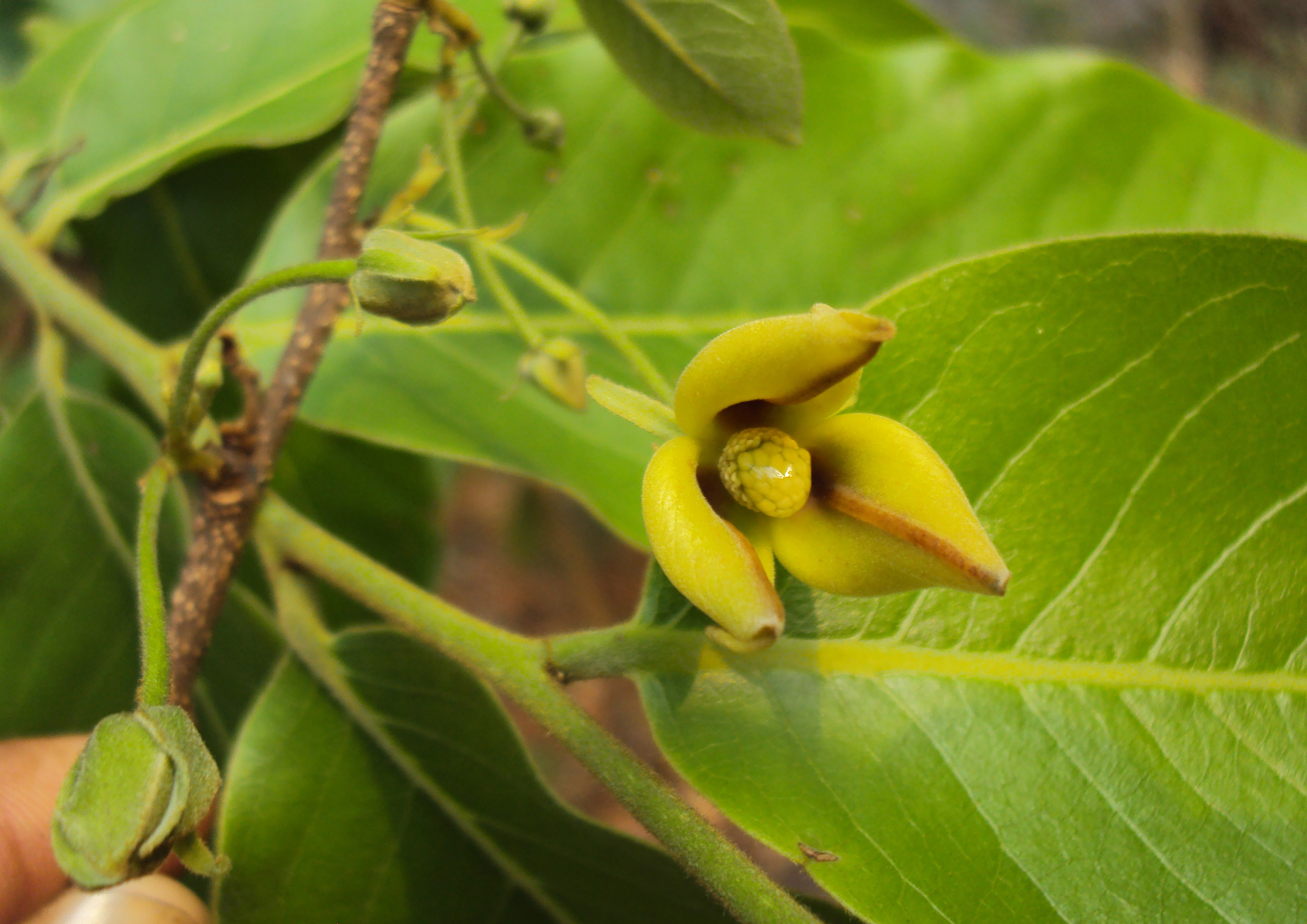
Miliusa tomentosa

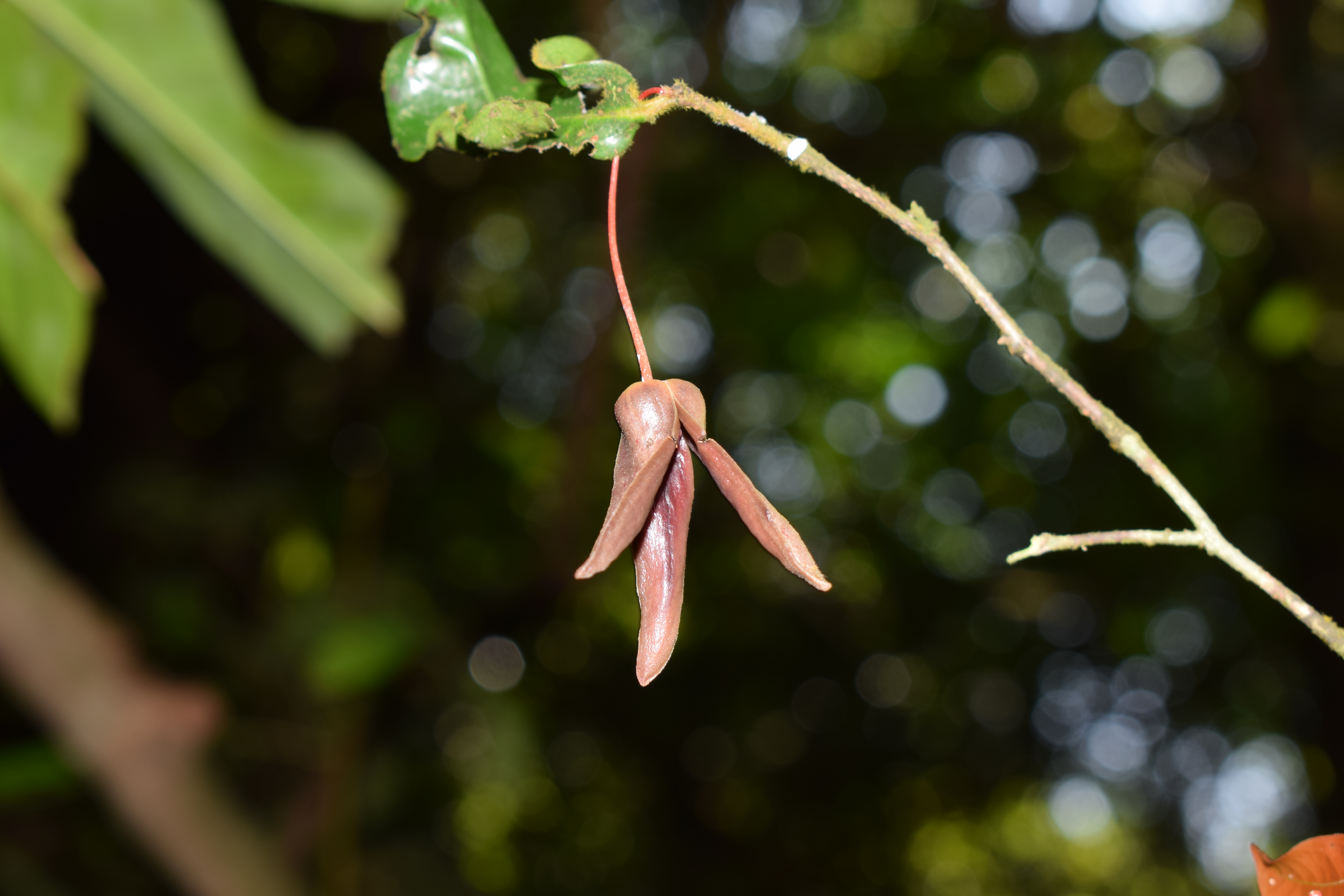
Miliusa paithalmalayana

Miliusa is a genus of plants in family Annonaceae. Species have been recorded from tropical and subtropical Asia to northern Australia.

== Accepted species ==
As of April 2025, Plants of the World Online (POWO) accepts the following 66 species:

- Miliusa agasthyamalana V.S.A.Kumar & Sindhu Arya
- Miliusa ammaiae Karupp. & P.S.S.Rich.
- Miliusa amplexicaulis Ridl.
- Miliusa andamanica (King) Finet & Gagnep.
- Miliusa astiana Chaowasku & Kessler
- Miliusa baillonii Pierre
- Miliusa balansae Finet & Gagnep.
- Miliusa banghoiensis Jovet-Ast
- Miliusa brahei (F.Muell.) Jessup
- Miliusa butonensis Chaowasku & Kessler
- Miliusa cambodgensis Chaowasku & Kessler
- Miliusa campanulata Pierre
- Miliusa caudata N.Balach. & Chakrab.
- Miliusa chantaburiana Damth. & Chaowasku
- Miliusa codonantha Chaowasku
- Miliusa cuneata Craib
- Miliusa dioeca (Roxb.) Chaowasku & Kessler
- Miliusa eupoda (Miq.) I.M.Turner
- Miliusa filipes Ridl.
- Miliusa flaviviridis N.V.Page, Poti & K.Ravik.
- Miliusa fragrans Chaowasku & Kessler
- Miliusa fusca Pierre
- Miliusa glandulifera C.E.C.Fisch.
- Miliusa glochidioides Hand.-Mazz.
- Miliusa gokhalaei Ratheesh, Sujanapal, Anil Kumar & Sivad.
- Miliusa hirsuta Chaowasku & Kessler
- Miliusa horsfieldii (Benn.) Baill. ex Pierre
- Miliusa indica Lesch. ex A.DC.
- Miliusa intermedia Chaowasku & Kessler
- Miliusa koolsii (Kosterm.) J.Sinclair
- Miliusa lanceolata Chaowasku & Kessler
- Miliusa longicarpa Z.Yuan Shi & X.L.Hou
- Miliusa macrocarpa Hook.f. & Thomson
- Miliusa macropoda Miq.
- Miliusa majestatis Damth., Sinbumr. & Chaowasku
- Miliusa malnadensis N.V.Page & Nerlekar
- Miliusa manickamiana Murugan
- Miliusa microphylla Damth. & Chaowasku
- Miliusa mollis Pierre
- Miliusa montana Gardner ex Hook.f. & Thomson
- Miliusa nakhonsiana Chaowasku & Kessler
- Miliusa nilagirica Bedd.
- Miliusa ninhbinhensis Chaowasku & Kessler
- Miliusa novoguineensis Mols & Kessler
- Miliusa paithalmalayana Josekutty
- Miliusa parviflora Ridl.
- Miliusa parvifolia (Kurz) Damth. & Chaowasku
- Miliusa pumila Chaowasku
- Miliusa saccata C.E.C.Fisch.
- Miliusa sahyadrica G.Rajkumar, Alister, Nazarudeen & Pandur.
- Miliusa sclerocarpa (A.DC.) Kurz
- Miliusa sessilis Chaowasku & Kessler
- Miliusa tenuistipitata W.T.Wang
- Miliusa thailandica Chaowasku & Kessler
- Miliusa thorelii Finet & Gagnep.
- Miliusa tirunelvelica Murugan, Manickam, Sundaresan & Jothi
- Miliusa tomentosa (Roxb.) Finet & Gagnep.
- Miliusa traceyi Jessup
- Miliusa tristis Kurz
- Miliusa umpangensis Chaowasku & Kessler
- Miliusa velutina (DC.) Hook.f. & Thomson
- Miliusa vidalii J.Sinclair
- Miliusa viridiflora Chaowasku & Kessler
- Miliusa wayanadica Sujanapal, Ratheesh & Sasidh.
- Miliusa wightiana Hook.f. & Thomson
- Miliusa zeylanica Gardner ex Hook.f. & Thomson
