= Miliusa zeylanica =

Conservation status
- Vulnerable (IUCN 3.1)

Scientific classification
- Kingdom: Plantae
- Clade: Embryophytes
- Clade: Tracheophytes
- Clade: Spermatophytes
- Clade: Angiosperms
- Clade: Magnoliids
- Order: Magnoliales
- Family: Annonaceae
- Genus: Miliusa
- Species: M. zeylanica

Binomial name
- Miliusa zeylanica Gardner ex Hook.f. & Thomson

Species of flowering plant

Miliusa zeylanica is a species of flowering plant in the Annonaceae family. It is a tree endemic to Sri Lanka.
