= Miliusa nilagirica =

Conservation status
- Vulnerable (IUCN 2.3)

Scientific classification
- Kingdom: Plantae
- Clade: Embryophytes
- Clade: Tracheophytes
- Clade: Spermatophytes
- Clade: Angiosperms
- Clade: Magnoliids
- Order: Magnoliales
- Family: Annonaceae
- Genus: Miliusa
- Species: M. nilagirica

Binomial name
- Miliusa nilagirica Bedd.

Species of flowering plant

Miliusa nilagirica is a species of flowering plant in the Annonaceae family. It is a tree endemic to the Western Ghats of southwestern India.
