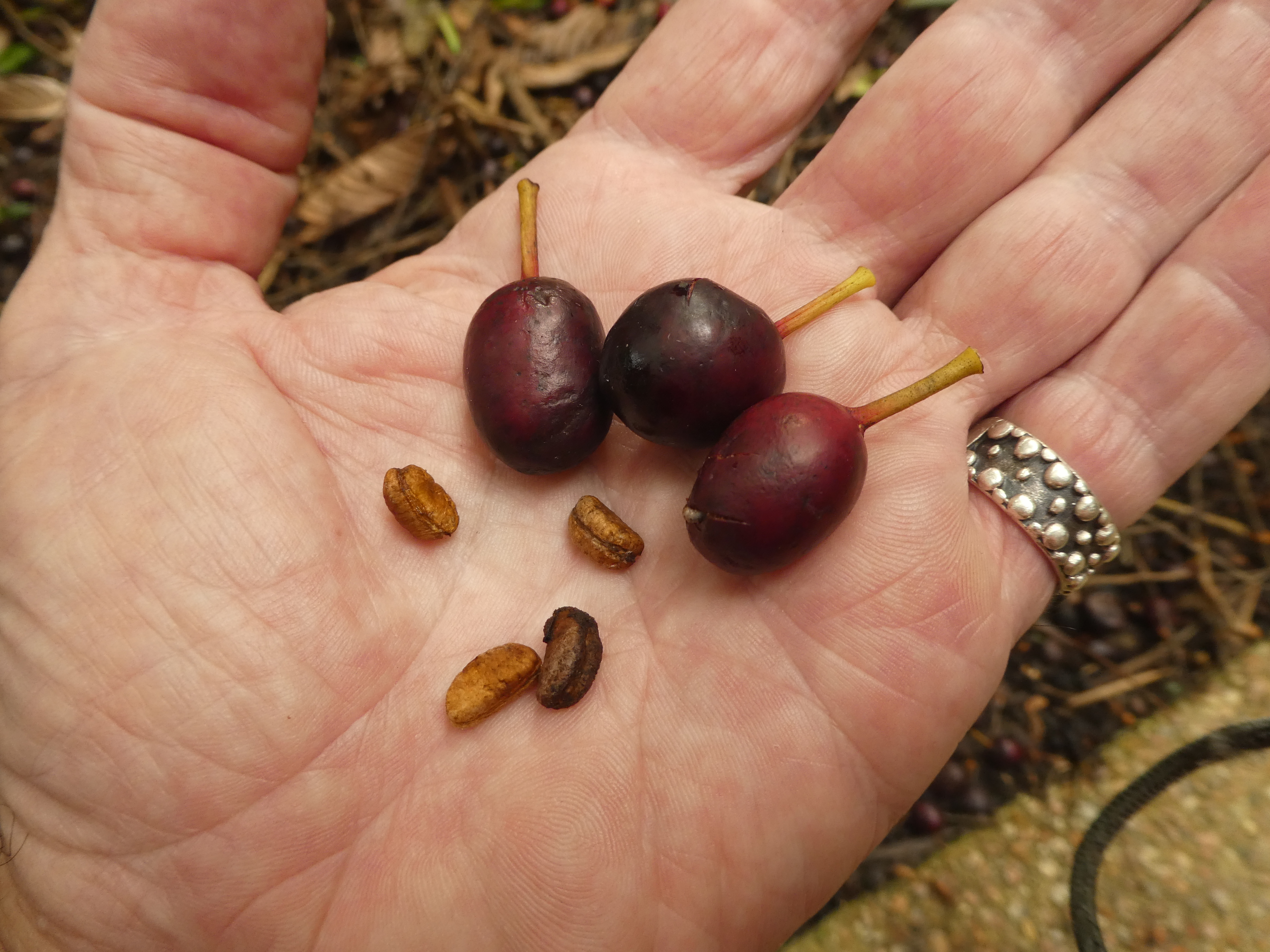
- Fruit and seeds

Conservation status
- Least Concern (IUCN 3.1)
- Least Concern (NCA)

Scientific classification
- Kingdom: Plantae
- Clade: Embryophytes
- Clade: Tracheophytes
- Clade: Spermatophytes
- Clade: Angiosperms
- Clade: Magnoliids
- Order: Magnoliales
- Family: Annonaceae
- Genus: Miliusa
- Species: M. horsfieldii

Binomial name
- Miliusa horsfieldii (Benn.) Baill. ex Pierre

Synonyms
- 12 synonyms: Saccopetalum horsfieldii Benn. (1840); Alphonsea prolifica Chun & F.C.How (1958); Miliusa arborea (Elmer) J.Sinclair (1955); Miliusa lineata (Craib) Ast (1938); Miliusa prolifica (Chun & F.C.How) P.T.Li (1993); Miliusa tectona Hutch. ex C.E.Parkinson (1923); Miliusa unguiculata (C.E.C.Fisch.) J.Sinclair (1955); Saccopetalum arboreum Elmer (1913); Saccopetalum lineatum Craib (1924); Saccopetalum prolificum (Chun & F.C.How) Tsiang (1964); Saccopetalum tectonum (Hutch. ex C.E.Parkinson) Chatterjee (1948); Saccopetalum unguiculatum C.E.C.Fisch. (1926)

= Miliusa horsfieldii =

Species of plant in the soursop family

Miliusa horsfieldii is a tree in the custard apple family Annonaceae. Its native range is from China through southeast Asia to Queensland, Australia. It grows to about 30 m (98 ft) tall, and inhabits lowland rainforest up to 200 m (660 ft) elevation.
