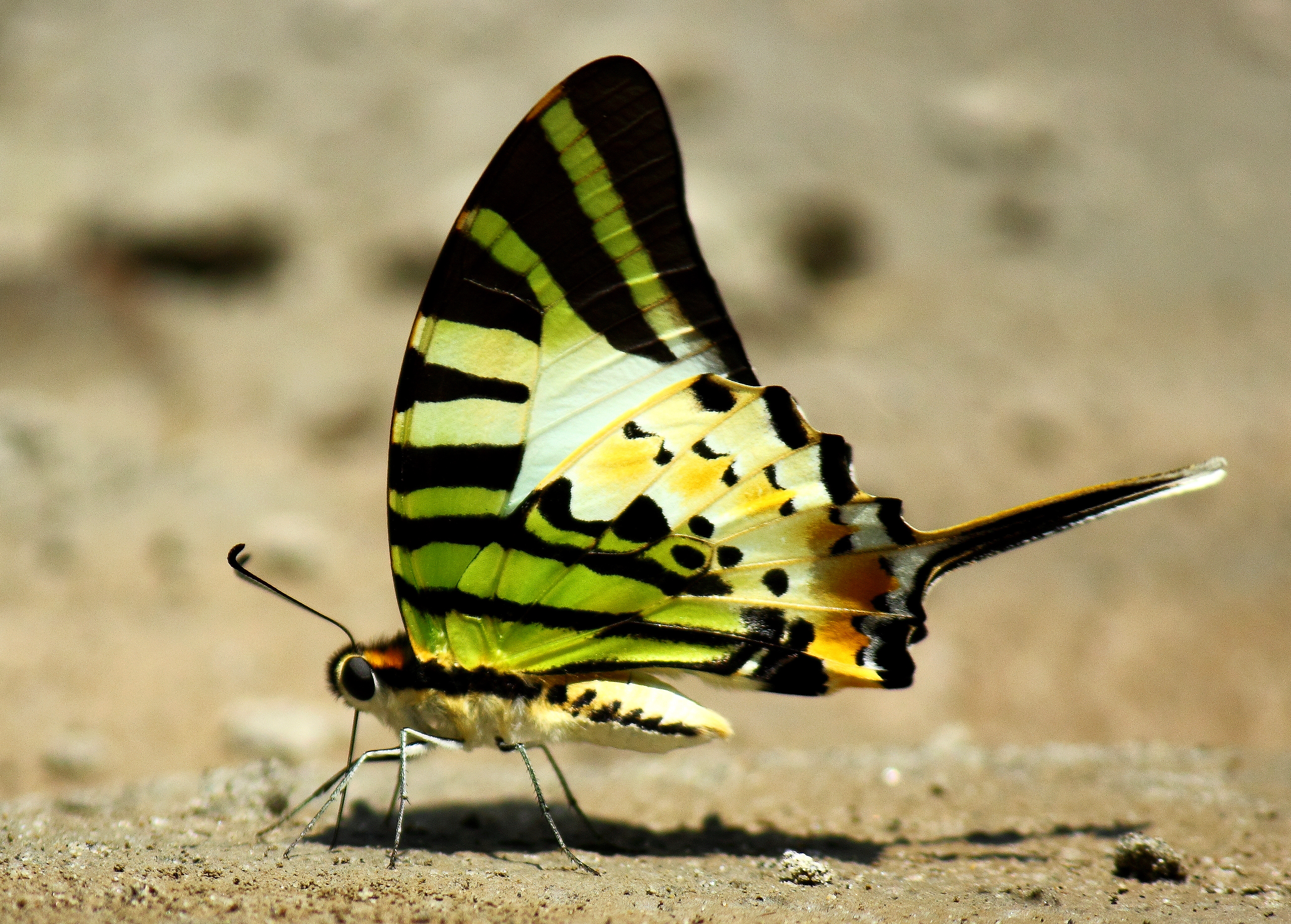
- Ventral view
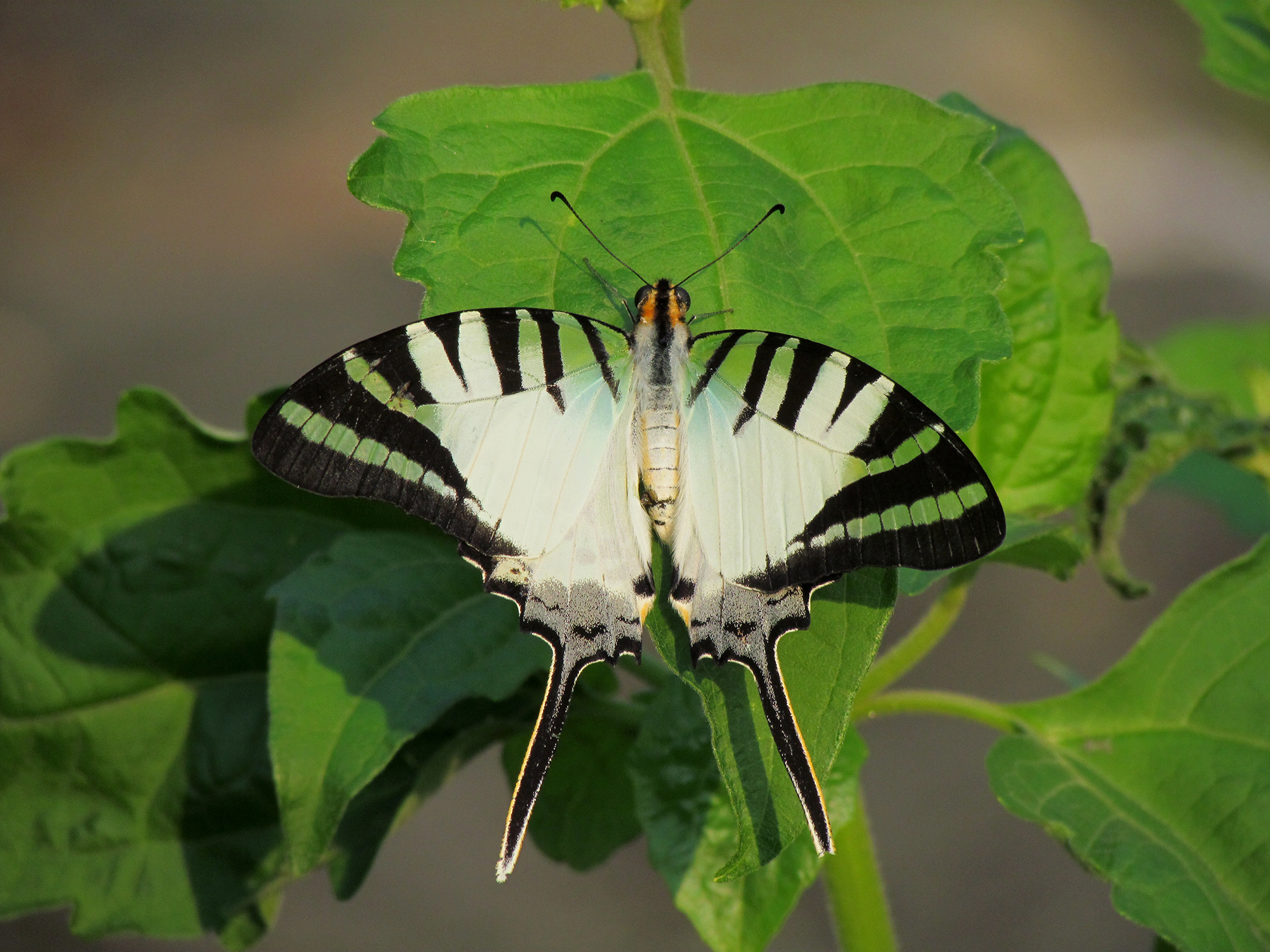
- Dorsal view

Scientific classification
- Kingdom: Animalia
- Phylum: Arthropoda
- Clade: Pancrustacea
- Class: Insecta
- Order: Lepidoptera
- Family: Papilionidae
- Genus: Graphium
- Species: G. antiphates

Binomial name
- Graphium antiphates (Cramer, 1775)

Synonyms
- Papilio antiphates Cramer, 1775; Pathysa antiphates (Cramer, 1775)

= Graphium antiphates =

Five-bar swordtail

Species of butterfly

Graphium antiphates, The Five-bar swordtail is a species of papilionid butterfly found in South and Southeast Asia. The species was first described by Pieter Cramer in 1775.

== Description ==
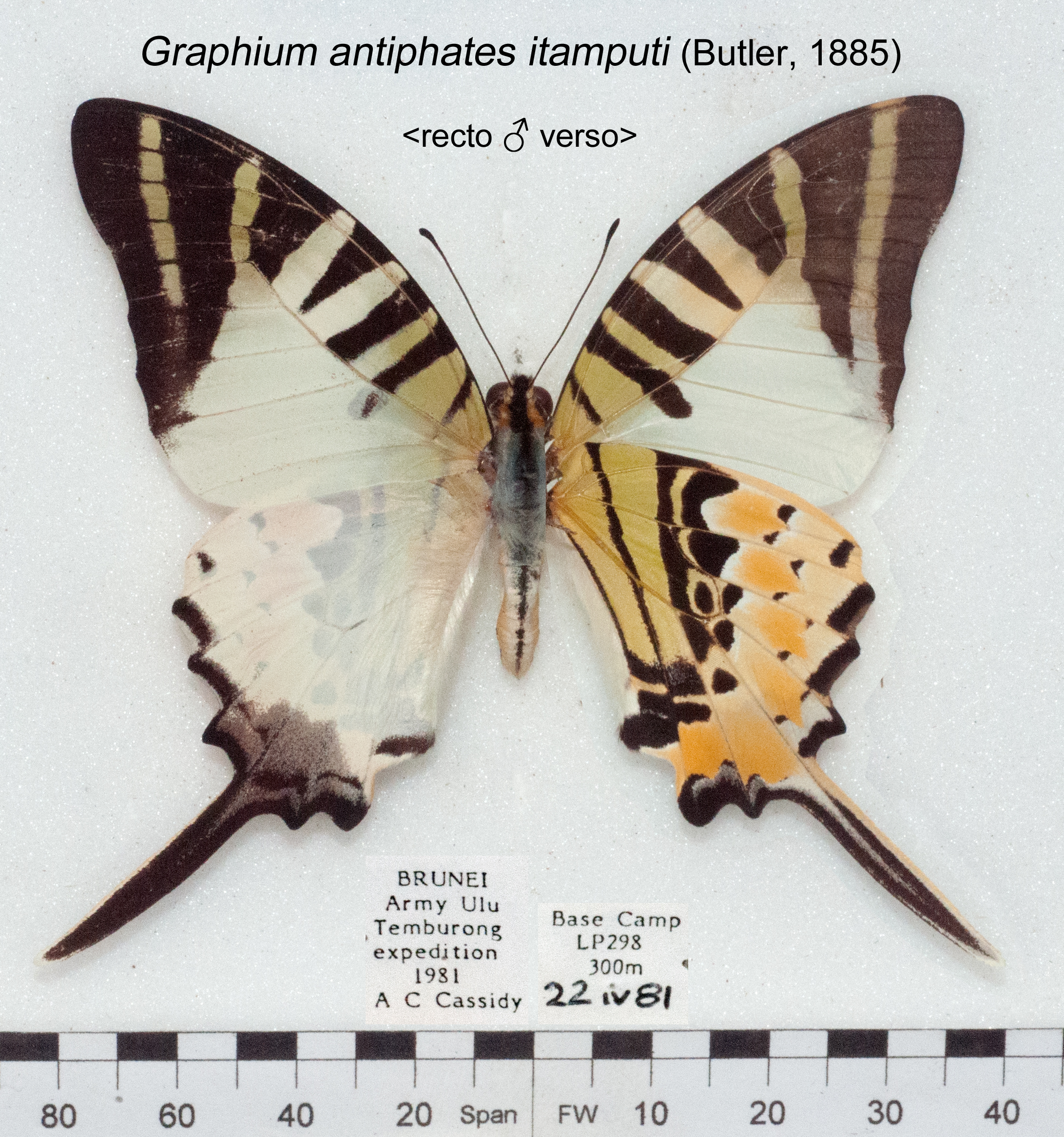

The ground colour of the upperside of both males and females is white. The forewing has the cell crossed by five short black bands, of which the basal extends to the dorsum, the sub-basal into interspace 1, the medial and pre-apical up to the median vein, and the apical or fifth along the discocellulars; this last band extends broadly on both sides of the veinlets and terminates at the lower apex of the cell; beyond these are broad postdiscal and terminal black transverse bands from costa to tornal angle; the two bands coalesce below vein 4 and terminate in a point at the tornus; the white portions of the cell anteriorly overlaid with pale green; short broken glossy green bands between the black cellular apical band and the discal band and anteriorly between the latter and the terminal band. The upperside of the hindwing has the basal three-fourths uniformly white, with black markings on the underside that show through; the terminal fourth dark grey traversed by a curved irregular subterminal series of black crescent shaped marks that ends in a black tornal spot and a terminal black band that follows the indentations of the wing; the emargination (notches in a margin) below the black tornal spot are edged with ochraceous; the tail blackish grey, edged and tipped with white.

The underside of the forewing is similar to the upperside in markings but the green shading over the white portions in the basal half of the cell more decided; the discal and terminal transverse black bands are separate, and are not joined posteriorly, the former edged posteriorly on both sides by dark grey due to the black on the upperside that shows through by transparency. The underside of the hindwing is half green on the basal part while the outer half white; a large black tornal spot; a black line along the dorsum that curves above the tornal spot outwards to vein 2; a straight subbasal black band from costa across cell that terminates on vein 2, where it joins the dorsal black line; a broader black band from costa across apex of cell extended into base of interspace 3; an irregular discal series of black markings curved inwards posteriorly towards the tornal spot; a subterminal series of very small slender black lunules in pairs, the ground colour on the inner side of these darkened to rich ochreous yellow; lastly, a series of short terminal black bars in the interspaces so arranged as to follow indentations of the termen; tail dusky black edged with white. Antenna black; head and thorax anteriorly with a broad black medial band, rest of thorax bluish; abdomen white, marked beneath on each side by a black stripe.

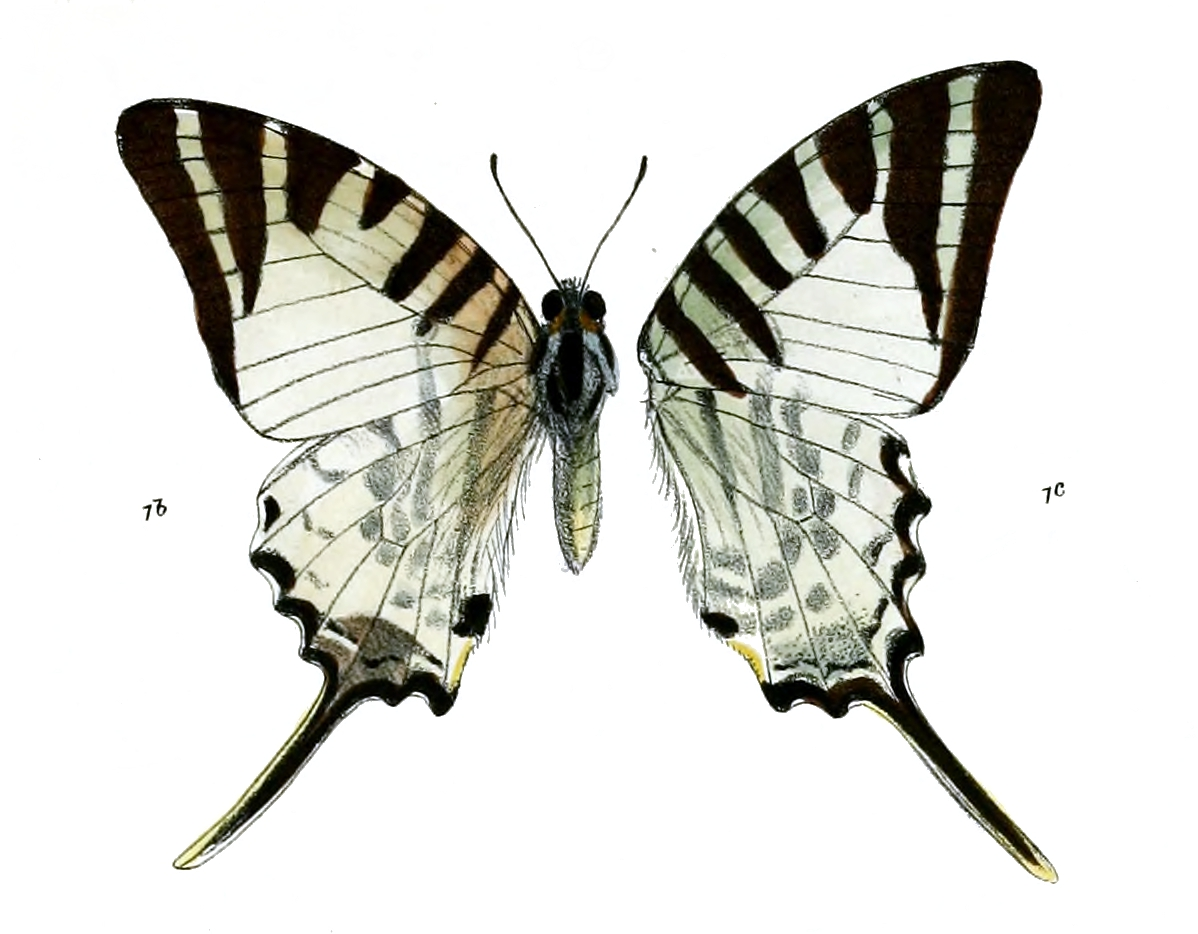
Composite specimen in Moore, 1903, Pl.474, 1b (Left), male from Sikkim, India; 1c (Right) male from Sri Lanka.

There are various published opinions on notable variations, often presented as races, varieties, or later subspecies. For example, Bingham (1907) says (p.99) that "Race alcibiades, Fabr. is the most widely spread race of antiphates, from which it differs as follows: Upperside of males and females, all the black markings shorter and narrower. Forewing: the discal and terminal bands separate, the former rarely extended below vein 3, the latter in no specimen reaches the dorsal margin. Hindwing: the broad grey area on the terminal margin reduced to a small patch of grey at the apices of interspaces 2 to 4; the subterminal black markings rarely present anteriorly, generally confined to the limits of the grey patch. Underside: the extent of the black markings similarly reduced, otherwise as in the typical form". However, a large number of authors have present contending view on the appropriate taxon names for any subdivisions within Graphium antiphates (Cramer, 1775), and their geographic distributions.

== Habits ==
It is known to mud-puddle.

== Life history ==
The caterpillar is white in the early stage and turns yellow in the last instar. In its late stage, it is like the caterpillar of Pathysa nomius. (Davidson & Aitken quoted in Bingham) The green pupa, is as in all swallowtails, is held by a silk girdle. Said to be found mainly on the plant Unona lawii and never under stones. (Davidson and Aitken)

== Gallery ==
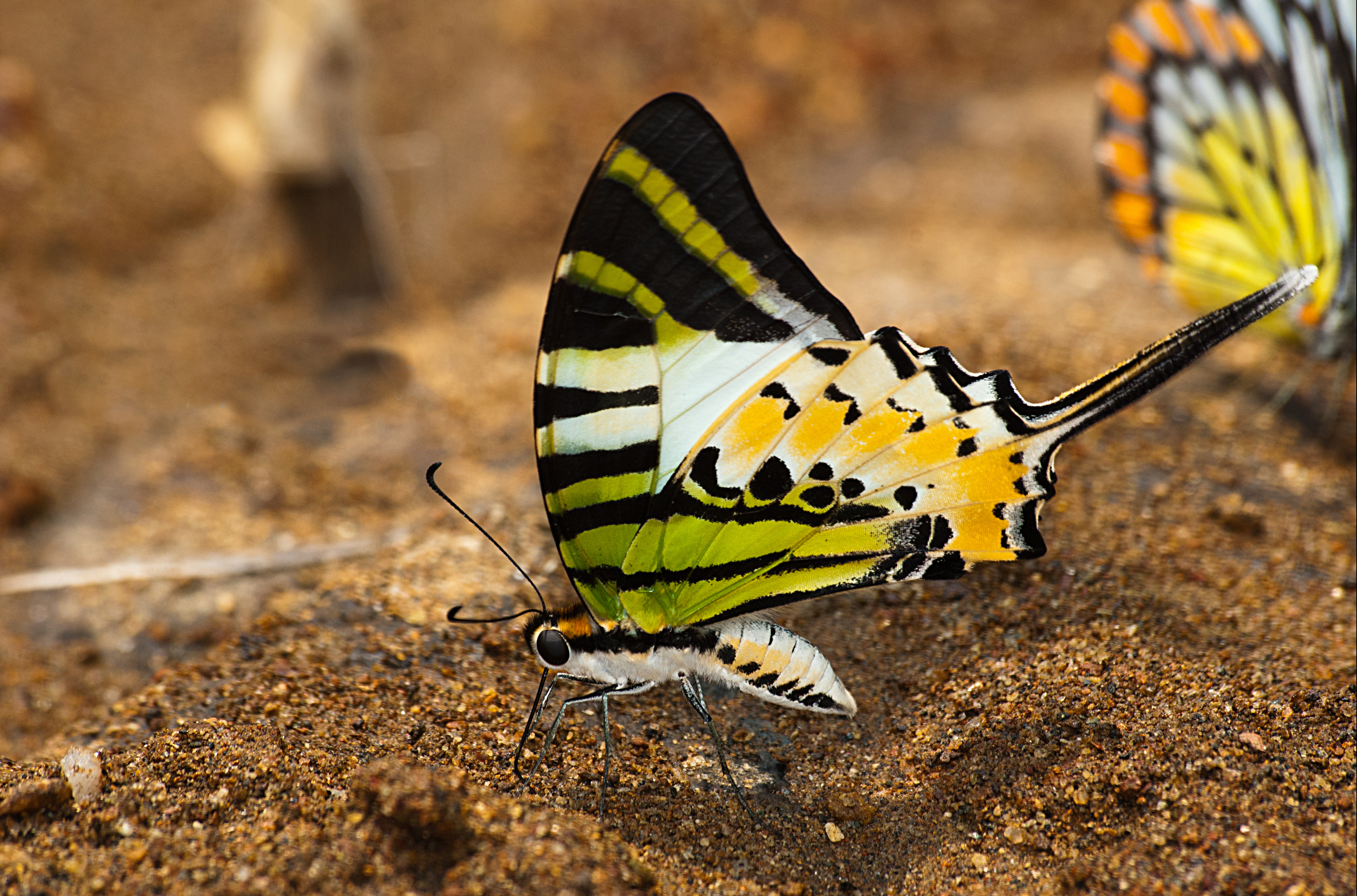
Five-bar swordtails in Aralam Wildlife Sanctuary, India

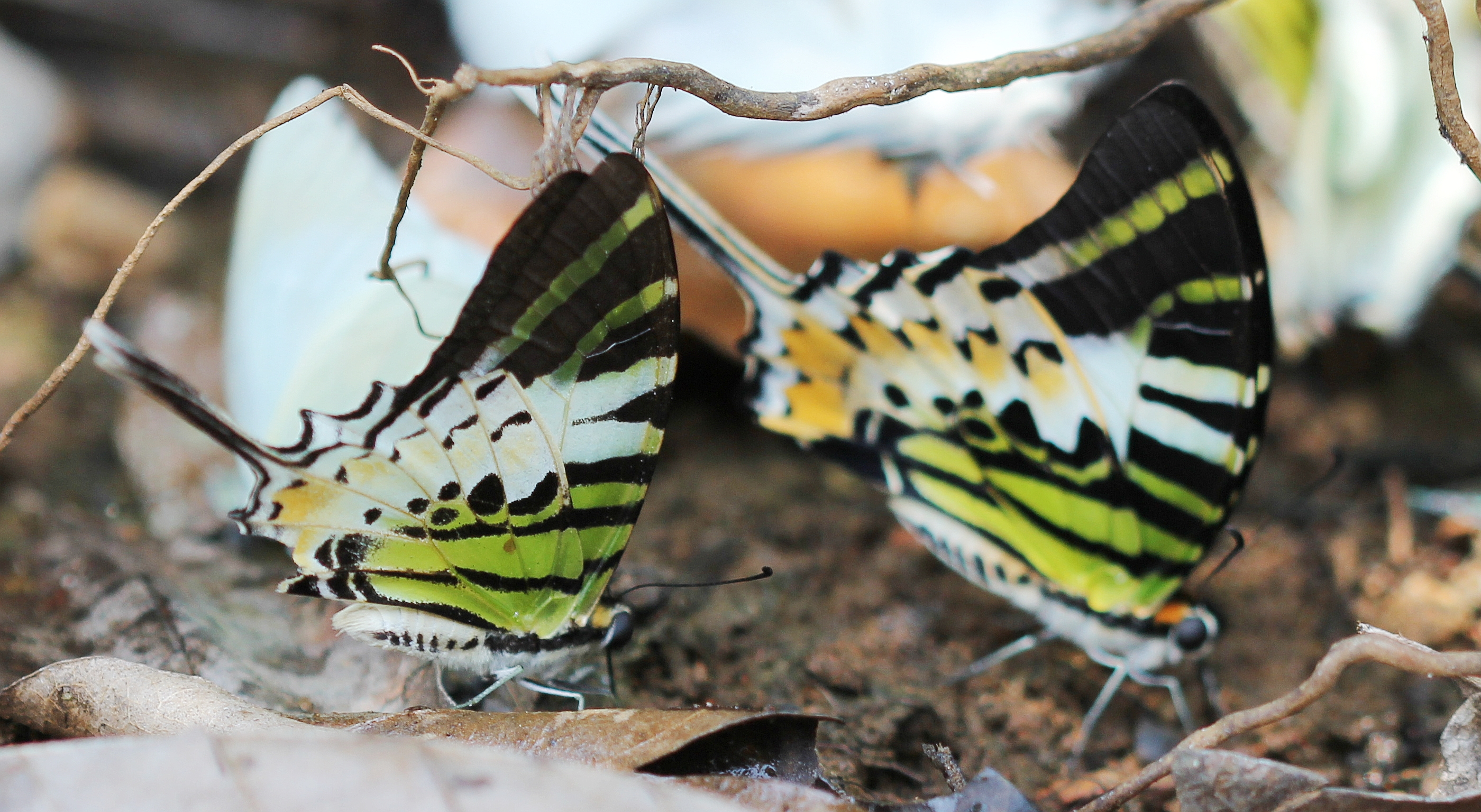
Five-bar swordtails mud-puddling in Someshwara Wildlife Sanctuary, India

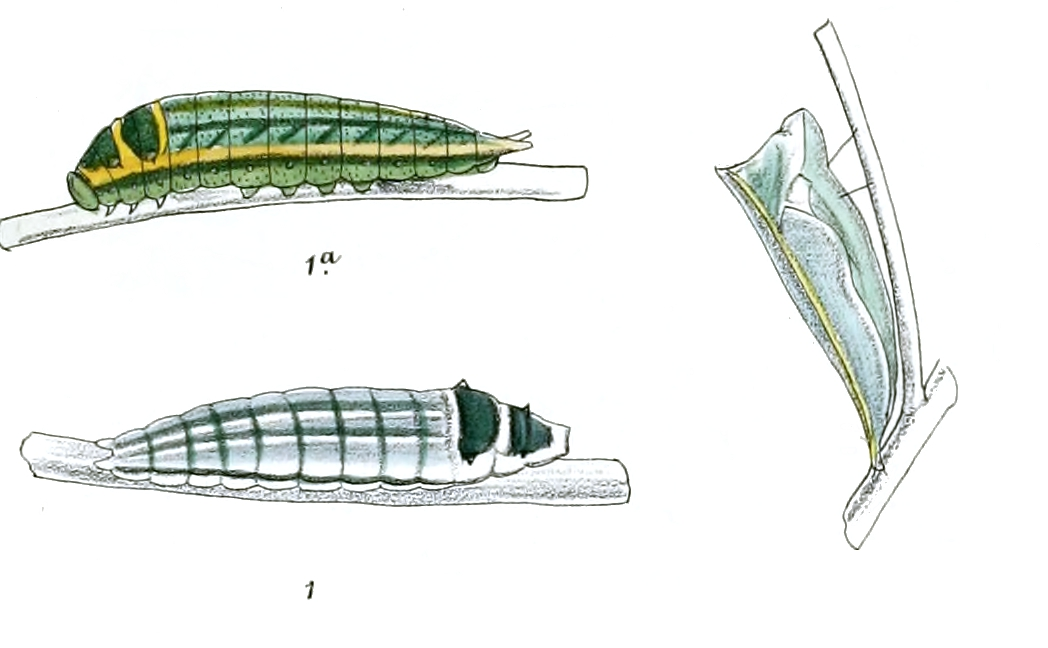
Larva and pupa

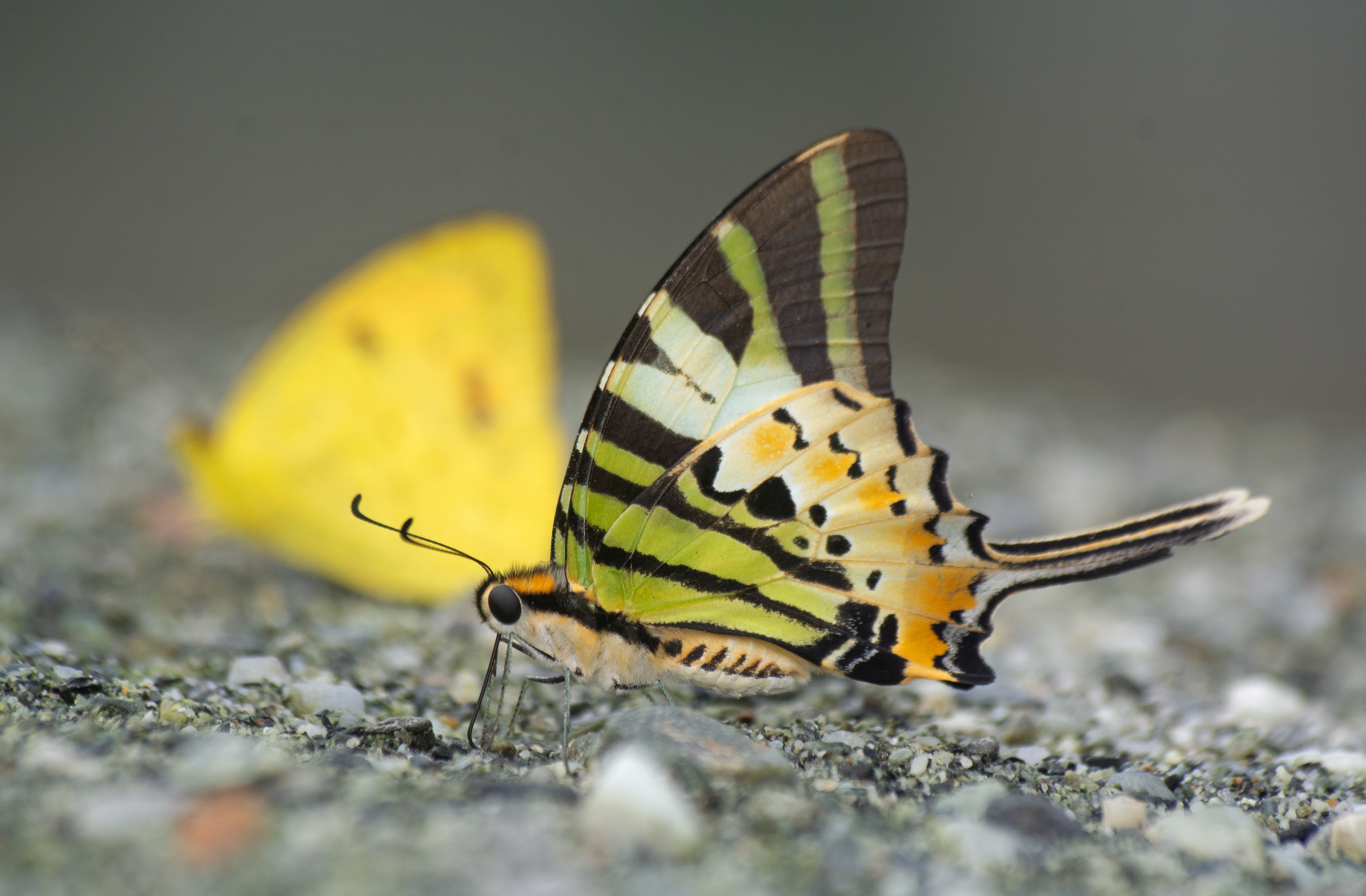
Photographed in Buxa Tiger Reserve, West Bengal.
