= Georgios Soulios =

Greek guerrilla fighter

Kapetan (Chieftain) Georgios Soulios
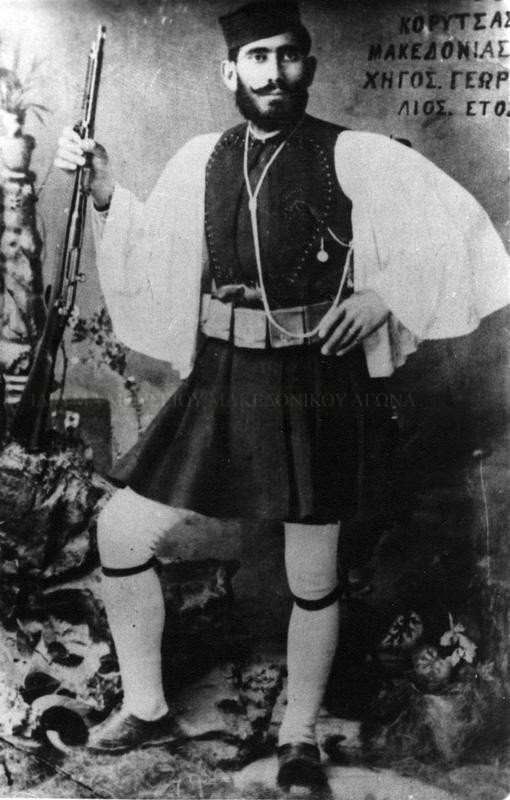
- Georgios Soulios as a Makedonomachos.
- Native name: Γεώργιος Σούλιος
- Born: Georgios Vasou Soulios (Γεώργιος Βάσου Σούλιος) c. 1885; Orman Ciflik, Korçë District, Monastir Vilayet, Ottoman Empire (now Albania)
- Died: c. 1927 Marina, Florina, Kingdom of Greece
- Allegiance: Kingdom of Greece; Autonomous Republic of Northern Epirus
- Branch: HMC
- Service years: 1906-1914
- Conflicts: Macedonian Struggle; Balkan Wars: First Balkan War; Second Balkan War; North Epirote Struggle; World War I: French Occupation of Korytsa (POW)

Georgios Soulios (Greek: Γεώργιος Σούλιος; 1885–1927) was a Greek guerrilla fighter of the early 20th century. He participated in the Macedonian Struggle, the Balkan Wars, and in the struggle for the establishment of the Autonomous Republic of Northern Epirus.

== Early life ==
Soulios was born in 1885, in the village of Orman Ciflik, just north of Korçë (then Ottoman Empire, in present-day Albania).

== Career ==
Macedonian Struggle and Balkan Wars

He joined the Greeks Struggle for Macedonia in 1906, where he would operate as a member of Georgios Tsontos' armed band. The next year, he would become a chieftain of his own band which operated in the regions of Korytsa and Western Macedonia, where he would fight the Bulgarian Komitadjis and Ottomans until the Commencement of the First Balkan War. He would also go on to became part of the personal guard of the local Orthodox Bishop of Korytsa, Germanos. He participated in the Balkan Wars, as a guerrilla leader and took part in the Greek occupation of Korytsa.

North Epirote Struggle for Autonomy

The following cession of his homeland to the newly established Principality of Albania catalyzed the uprising in the region of Northern Epirus (in modern southern Albania) against this decision and lead to the declaration of the Autonomous Republic of Northern Epirus in March 1914.

After the establishment of the newly arrived Albanian authorities in Korytsa, which were accompanied by Dutch officers of the International Gendarmerie, a local uprising broke out in favor of the Northern Epirus movement. Soulios was one of the leaders of the uprising, however, he was wounded in combat during an attempt to storm the enemy police headquarters of the city.

Later Years

In 1916, during World War I, the French Army that controlled the city, declared the Autonomous Albanian Republic of Korce. Soulios was arrested and sent to concentration camps in France. After the end of the war he moved to Greece and lived in the village of Marina, Florina Prefecture.

== Sources ==
- Dakin, Douglas (1966). The Greek Struggle in Macedonia: 1897-1913. Institute for Balkan Studies. "g. soulios."
- Kaphetzopoulos, Dimitrios; Flokas, Charalambos; Dima-Dimitriou, Angelliki (2000). The Struggle for Northern Epirus (1.udg. ed.). Athens: Hellenic Army General Staff, Army History Directorate [Ed. comm.: Dimitrios Gedeon]. ISBN 9789607897404.
