= Haris Epaminonda =

Cypriot visual artist

Haris Epaminonda (born 1980 in Nicosia, Cyprus) is an artist living and working in Berlin.

== Career ==
Solo and group exhibitions include: The Museum of Modern Art, Aspen Art Museum, The New Museum, Schirn Kunsthalle Frankfurt, Tate Modern, Secession, Modern Art Oxford, Le Plateau (FRAC) d’Île-de-France, Kunsthaus Zürich, KW Institute for Contemporary Art, Point Centre for Contemporary Art, Martin-Gropius-Bau, Kunstmuseum St. Gallen, Hammer Museum, Querini Stampalia, Site Gallery, Malmö Konsthall, The Renaissance Society, Neuer Berliner Kunstverein, Hamburger Bahnhof, Badischer Kunstverein, Museo Madre, Contemporary Art Museum St. Louis, as well as at Documenta 13, Manifesta, Berlin Biennale, São Paulo Biennale, Sharjah Biennale, Athens Biennale, Pune Biennale and Venice Biennale.

At the 2019 Venice Biennale, Epaminonda won the Silver Lion for promising young participant in the central exhibition.

== Art market ==
Epaminonda is represented by Sylvia Kouvali Gallery (former RODEO) in London and Athens and Galleria Massimo Minini in Brescia, Italy.
