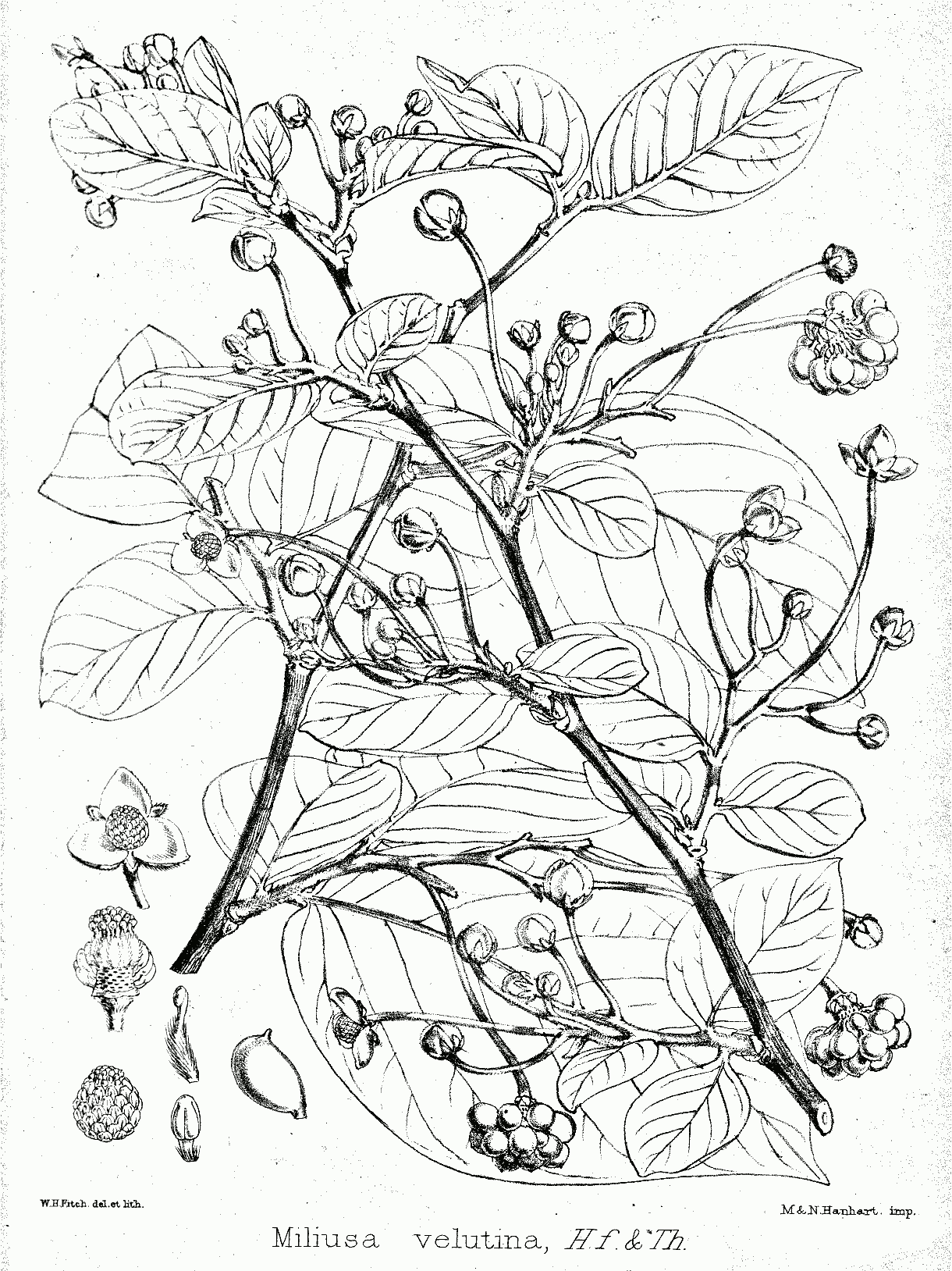

Conservation status
- Least Concern (IUCN 3.1)

Scientific classification
- Kingdom: Plantae
- Clade: Embryophytes
- Clade: Tracheophytes
- Clade: Spermatophytes
- Clade: Angiosperms
- Clade: Magnoliids
- Order: Magnoliales
- Family: Annonaceae
- Genus: Miliusa
- Species: M. velutina

Binomial name
- Miliusa velutina (DC.) Hook.f. & Thomson

Synonyms
- Guatteria velutina (DC.) A.DC.; Guatteria villosa G.Don; Miliusa villosa W.Theob.; Uvaria velutina DC.; Uvaria villosa Roxb.

= Miliusa velutina =

Species of plant

Miliusa velutina is a species of flowering plant belonging to the family Annonaceae. It is a tree native the Indian Subcontinent and mainland Indochina, ranging from India in the west to Vietnam in the east.

== Vernacular names ==
Its names in Malayalam are കാനക്കൈത, വില്ലൂന്നി.

== Phenology ==
The plant flowers and fruits from February to October.

== Uses ==
The plant has traditionally been used as a vegetable by local populations, and as an herbal remedy in several countries to treat conditions such as inflammation and bacterial infections.
