= Epameinondas Pentheroudakis =

Greek general

- Native name: Επαμεινώνδας Πενθερουδάκης
- Born: 1926; Episkopi, Lappes, Second Hellenic Republic
- Died: 1996
- Allegiance: Greece
- Service / branch: Hellenic Army
- Rank: General
- Wars: Greek Civil War

Epameinondas Pentheroudakis tou Georgiou (Greek: Επαμεινώνδας Πενθερουδάκης του Γεωργίου; Episkopi, Lappes, 1926 – 1996) was a general of the Greek army. He acted as the Chief of the Hellenic Army General Staff from 1984 to 1986.

He was a close associate of Antonis Drossoyannis.

Military offices
Preceded by Lt General Vasileios Kourkafas	Chief of the Hellenic Army General Staff; 1984 – 1986	Succeeded by Lt General Stamatis Vellidis
