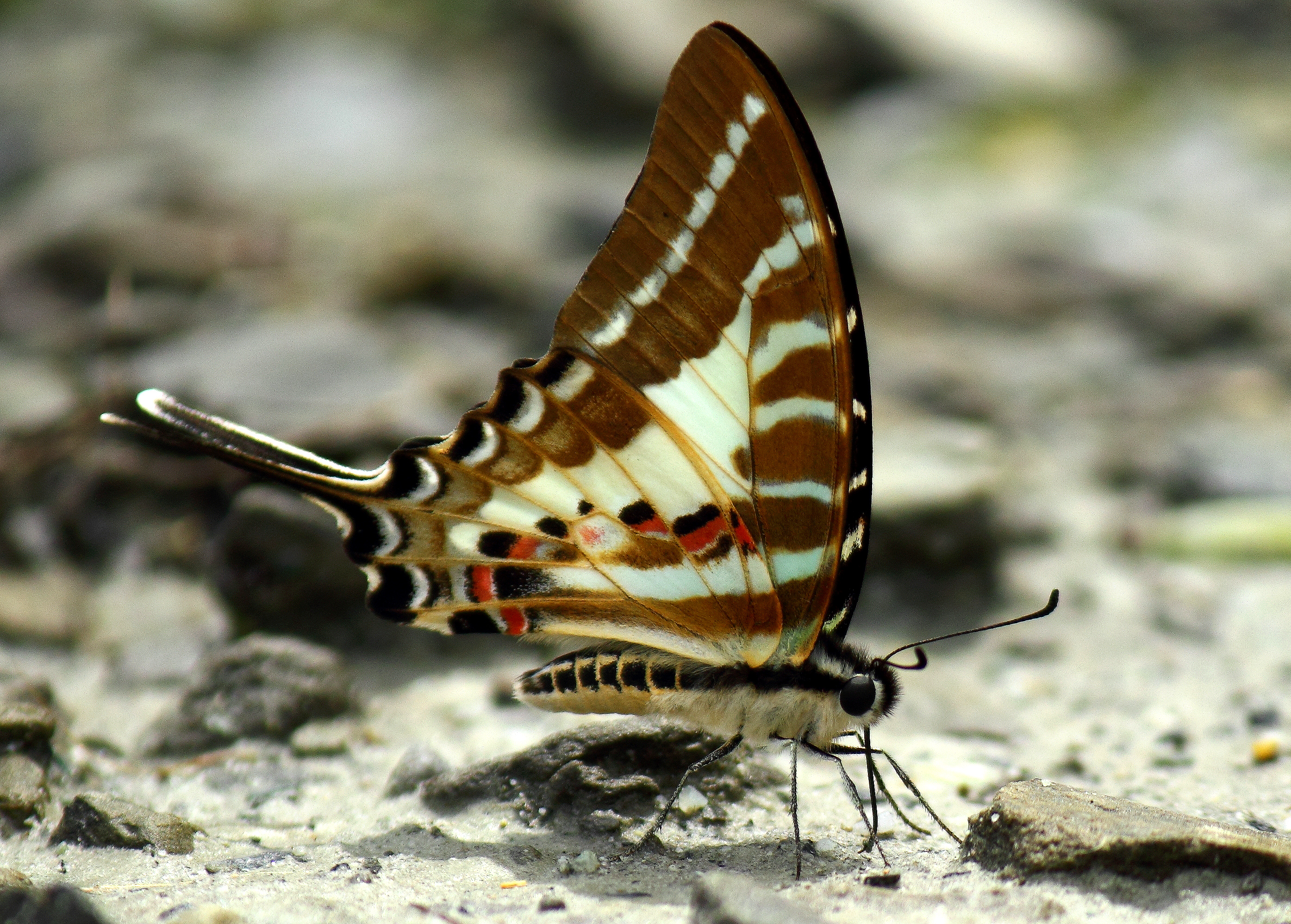
- West Bengal, India

Scientific classification
- Kingdom: Animalia
- Phylum: Arthropoda
- Clade: Pancrustacea
- Class: Insecta
- Order: Lepidoptera
- Family: Papilionidae
- Genus: Graphium
- Species: G. aristeus

Binomial name
- Graphium aristeus (Stoll, 1782)

= Graphium aristeus =

Chain swordtail

Species of butterfly

Graphium aristeus, the chain swordtail, is a butterfly in the family Papilionidae (swallowtails). It is found in the Indomalayan and Australasian realms. subcontinental subspecies G. a. anticrates is protected by law in India. It is normally found in Sikkim, Bhutan, Meghalaya, West Bengal and Assam. In Pakistan, it is normally found in the reigns of Himalayas.

== Description ==
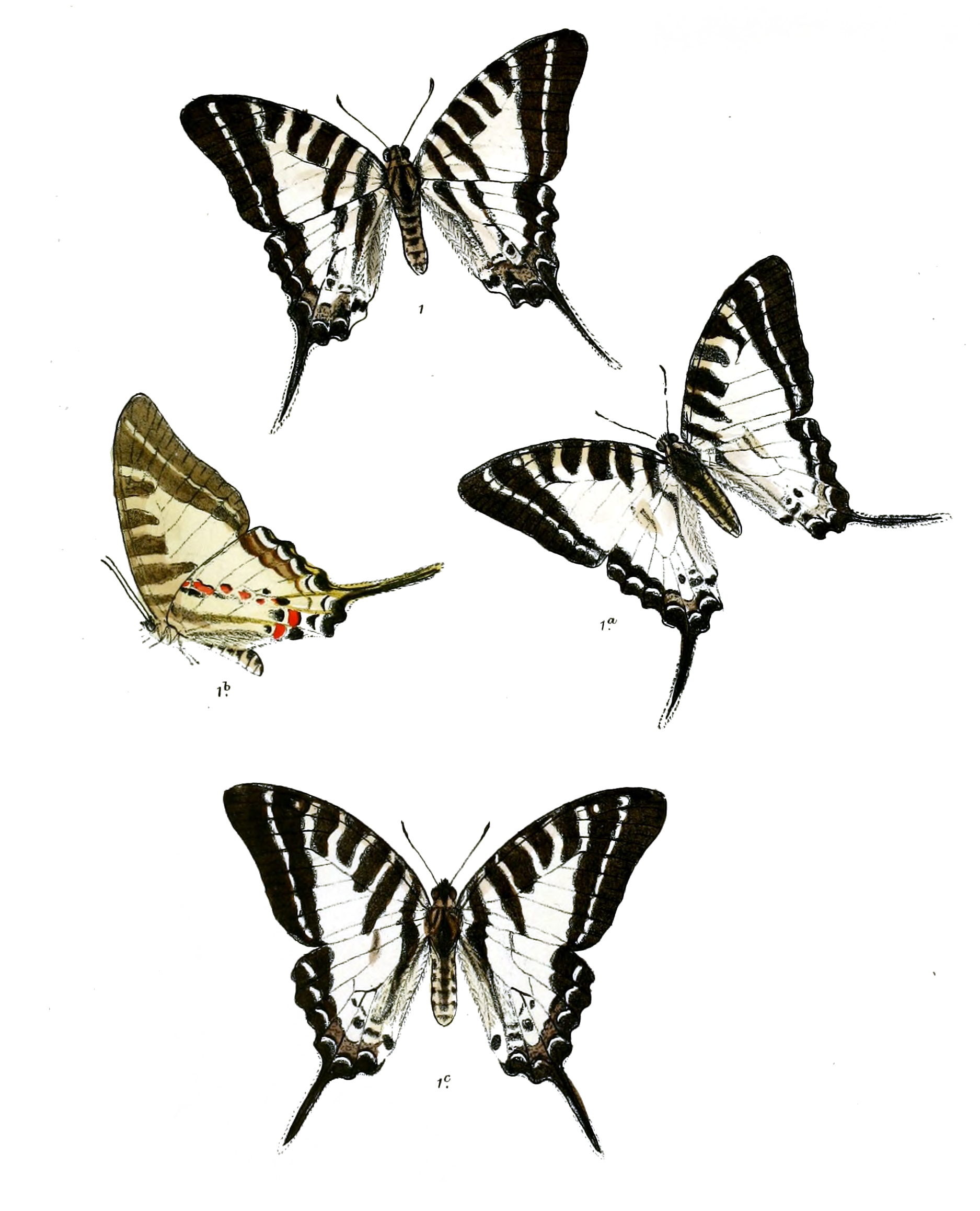
Males and female (below) of G. a. anticrates

The first description was given by Caspar Stoll in 1782.

The forewings are yellowish. The outer part of the wing is dark brown and contains a thin yellow strip. Four dark brown stripes dominate the wing. Next to the body there is a dark brown area. The underside of Graphium aristeus is very similar to the upper side.

The hindwings are yellowish and they have long tails. The edge is wavy. The outer part of the wing is dark brown and contains a chain of yellow spots. The inner edge is dark brown. In the middle of the wing there is a dark brown strip. The underside is very similar to the upperside, but a chain of red spots dominates the wing.

The body is black. The thorax and the head are also black. The underside of all parts is yellow.

== Distribution ==
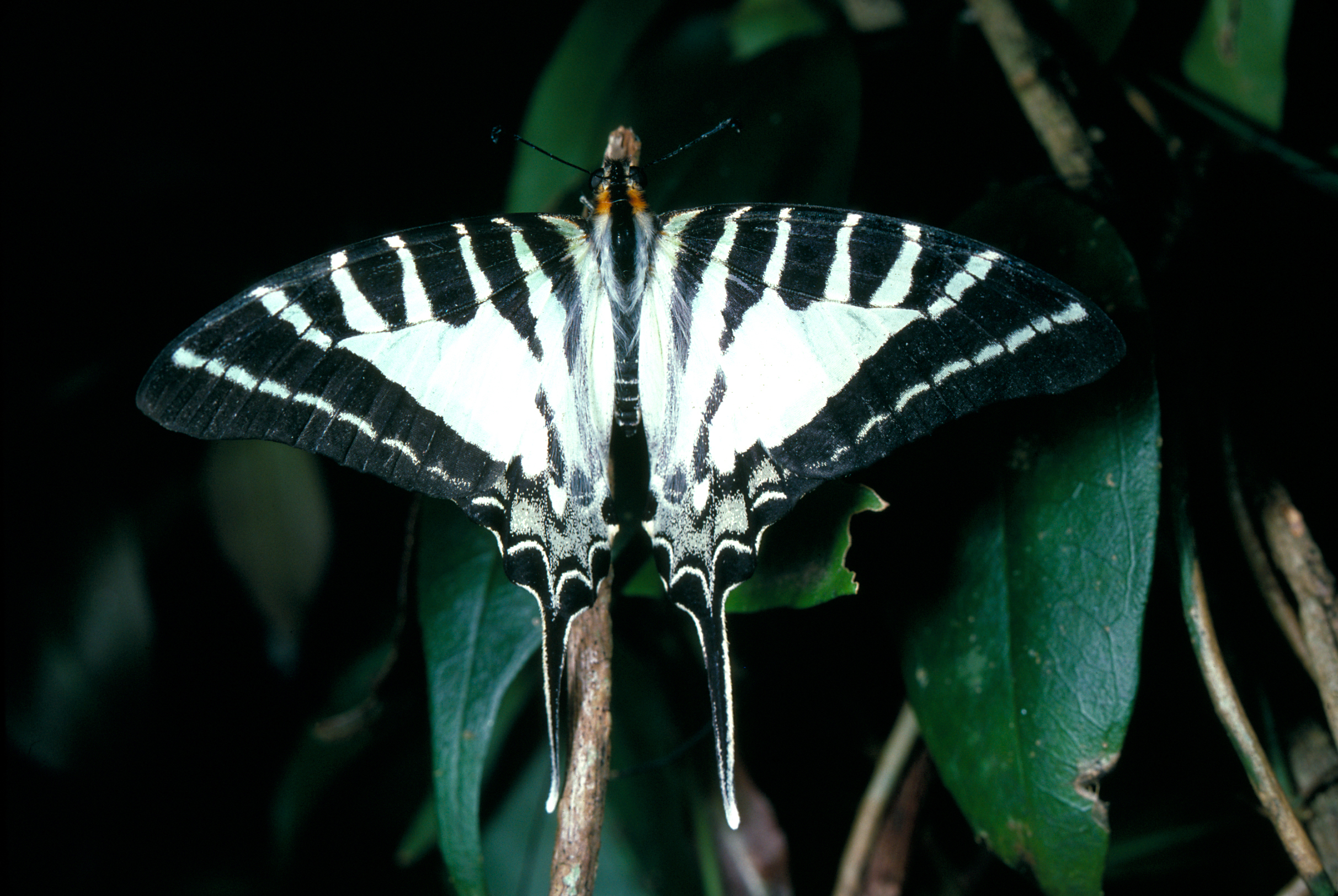
Chain swordtail (UP) from Australia.

Graphium aristeus is a butterfly from the Australasian and Indomalayan realms. It is also widely distributed in New Guinea.

Papua localities: Salawati: Salawati Mountains; Biak: Wardo; New Guinea: Akimuga (Kampong Baru & Fafafuku), Beaufortbivak, Dabra (Mamberamo), East Tami, Homasam, Kobakama, Kopi River (Timika), Kuala Kenkana (Timika), Van Weels Camp (Keerom), Wendesi, Werba (Fakfak)

External distribution: Northern India, Sikkim to South China, Philippines and Indonesia, New Guinea, Queensland, New Britain, New Ireland and Manus.

== Subspecies ==
- Graphium aristeus aristeus Ambon, Serang
- Graphium aristeus anticrates (Doubleday, 1846) North India, Nepal, Sikkim, Assam
- Graphium aristeus hermocrates (C. & R. Felder, 1865) Burma - Thailand, Timor, Wetar, Damar, Philippines (Balabac, Basilan, Bohol, Bongao, Busuanga, Cebu, Dinagar, Dumaran, Leyte, Luzon, Marnduque, Masbate, Mindanao, Mindoro, Negros, Palawan, Panaon, Panay, Samar, Sibuyan, Siquijor, Tawitawi)
- Graphium aristeus hainanensis (Chou & Gu, 1994) Hainan
- Graphium aristeus parmatus (Gray, [1853]) Aru, Waigeu, W.Irian, New Guinea, Papua, North Queensland
- Graphium aristeus paron (Godman & Salvin, 1879) New Britain, New Ireland
- Graphium aristeus bifax (Rothschild, 1898) Obi

== See also ==
- Papilionidae
