= Epameinondas Charisiadis =

Greek revolutionary

Epameinondas Charisiadis (Greek: Επαμεινώνδας Χαρισιάδης) was a Greek revolutionary of the Northern Epirus movement, politician and doctor.

Charisiadis was born in Korçë, in modern southern Albania, then Ottoman Empire. In 1914, he was among the local Greek community who organized units of volunteers, known as "Sacred Bands", to defend Korce from eminent incorporation to the newly established Albanian principality. Charisiadis was one of the main Northern Epirote leaders who participated in the anti-Albanian uprising of March 1914 in Korçë. During the rebellion he formed an armed unit in Bilisht and attempted to reinforce the revolutionaries in Korçë.

Charisiadis was elected as member of the Greek parliament (1915-1917) for the Korytsa prefecture, when his homeland came under Greek control. In December 1940, during World War II, Korçë came again under Greek control during the Greco-Italian War. Charisiadis was among the local Greek-Albanian committee who signed the surrender protocol of Korçë.

== Sources ==
- Kaphetzopoulos, Ioannis; Flokas, Charalambos; Dima-Dimitriou, Angeliki (2000). The Struggle for Northern Epirus. Athens: Hellenic Army General Staff, Army History Directorate. ISBN 9789607897404.
