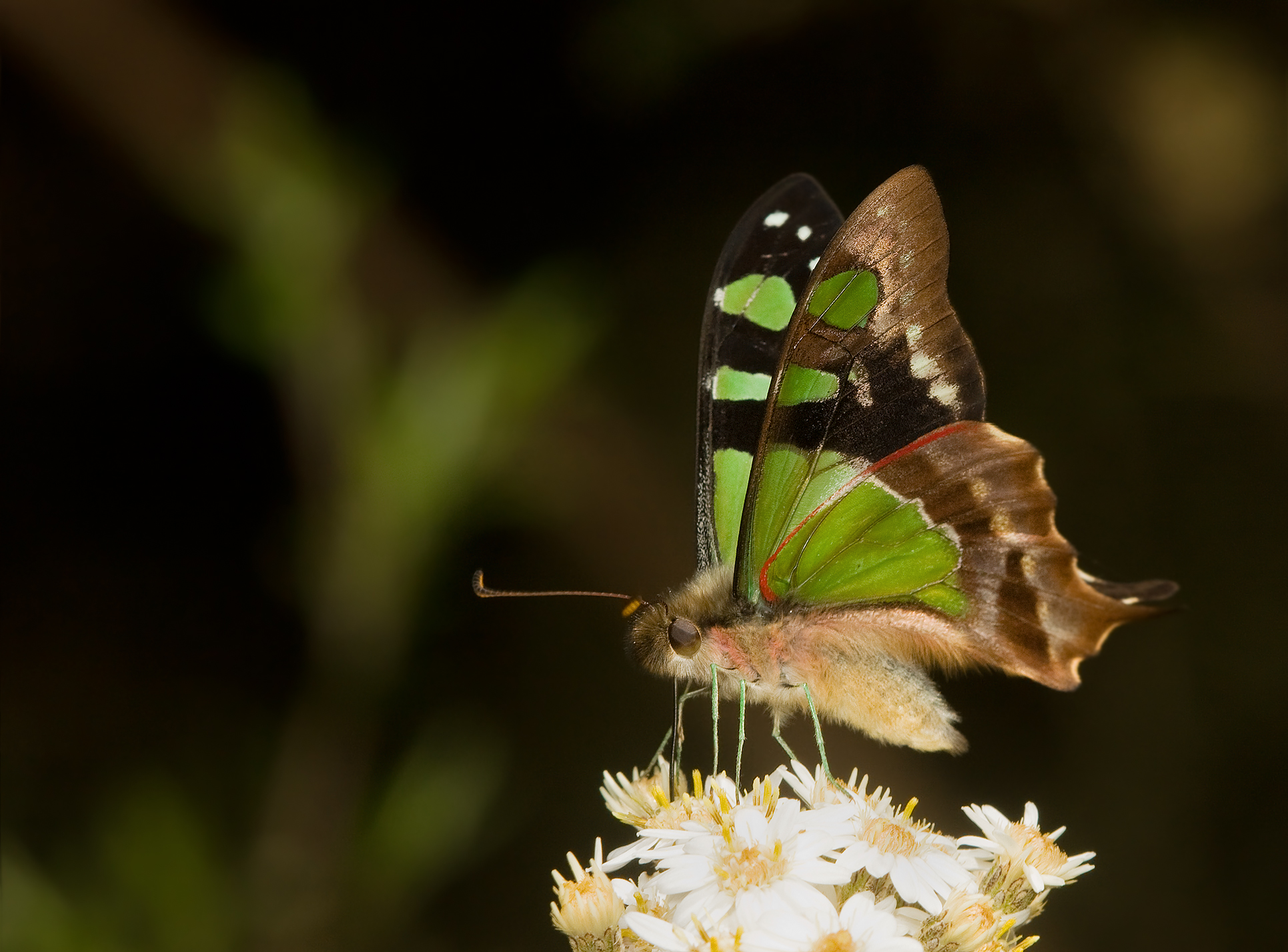
- Macleay's swallowtail (Graphium macleayanus)

Scientific classification
- Kingdom: Animalia
- Phylum: Arthropoda
- Class: Insecta
- Order: Lepidoptera
- Family: Papilionidae
- Subfamily: Papilioninae
- Tribe: Leptocircini; Kirby, 1896

Genera
- See text

Synonyms
- Graphiini

= Leptocircini =

Tribe of swallowtail butterflies

Leptocircini is a tribe of swallowtail butterflies that includes the genera Eurytides (kite swallowtails), Graphium (swordtails), and Lamproptera (dragontails).

== Taxonomy ==
The tribe consists of roughly 140 species in nine genera worldwide and one native North American species, Eurytides marcellus.

== Genera ==
This tribe consists of the following genera:

- Eurytides
- Graphium
- Iphiclides
- Lamproptera
- Meandrusa
- Mimoides
- Protesilaus
- Protographium
- Teinopalpus

== Examples of butterflies from each genera ==
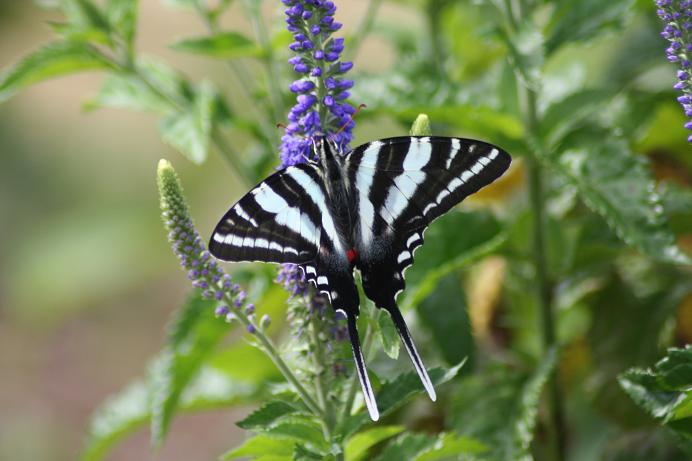
Eurytides marcellus

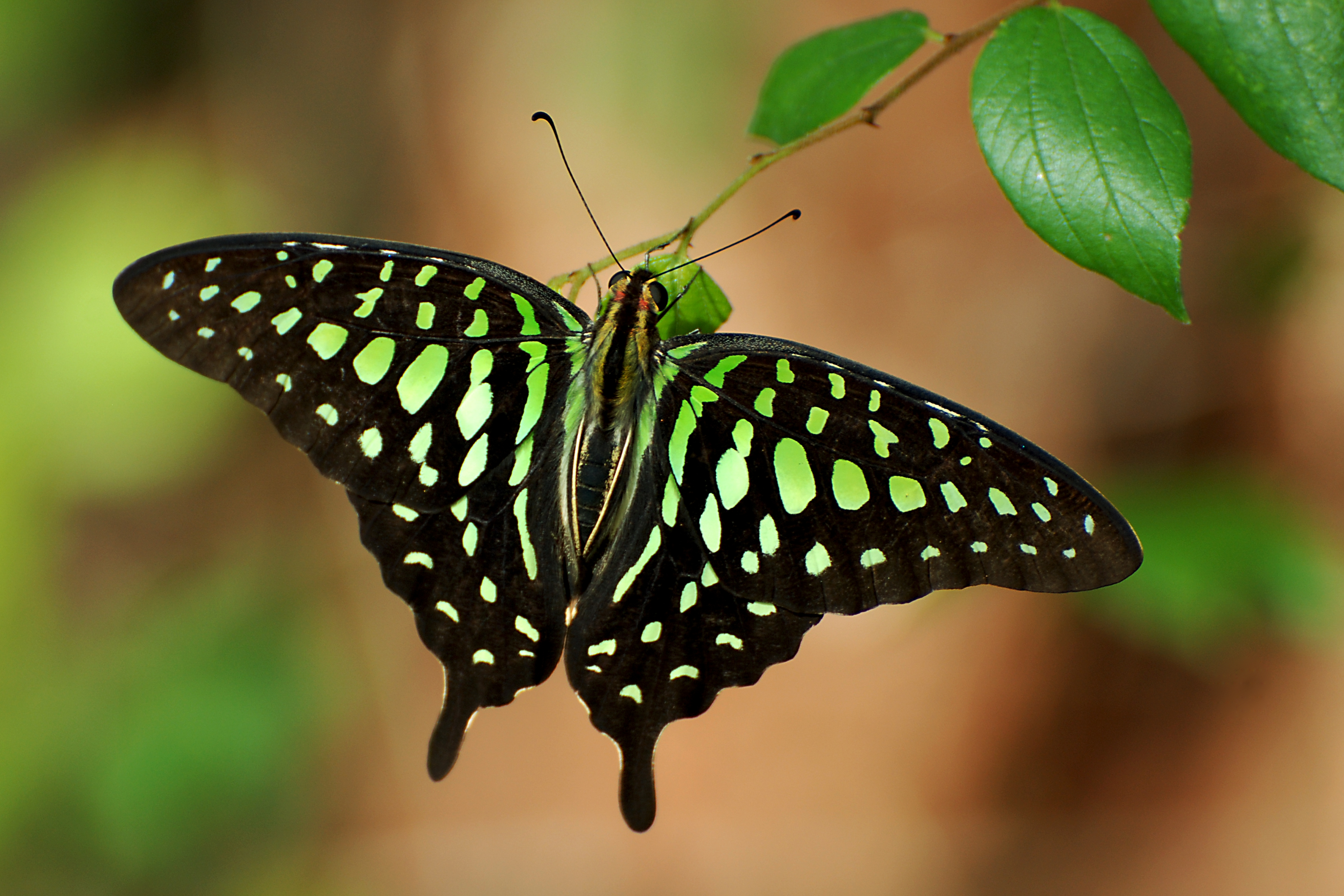
Graphium agamemnon

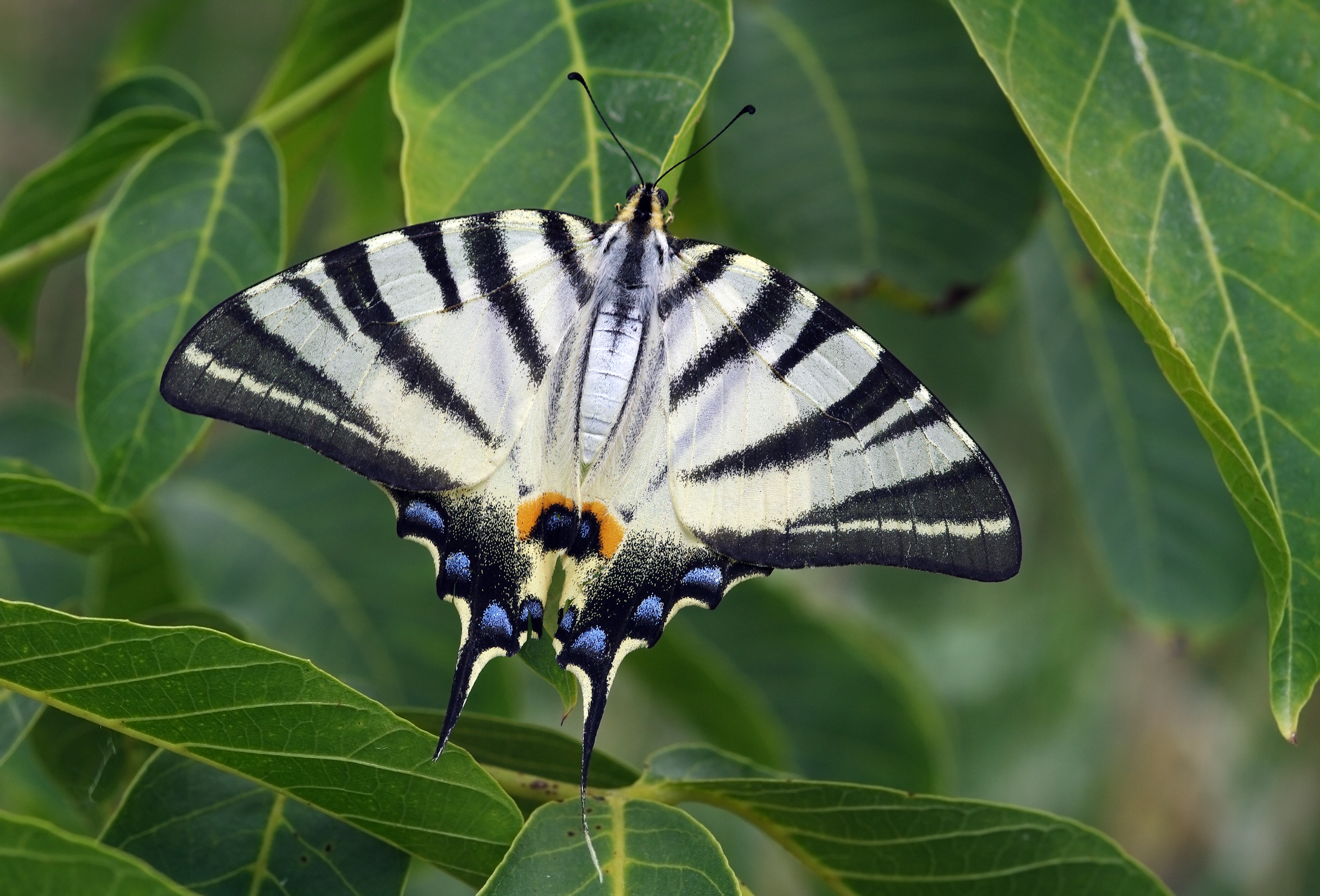
Iphiclides podalirius

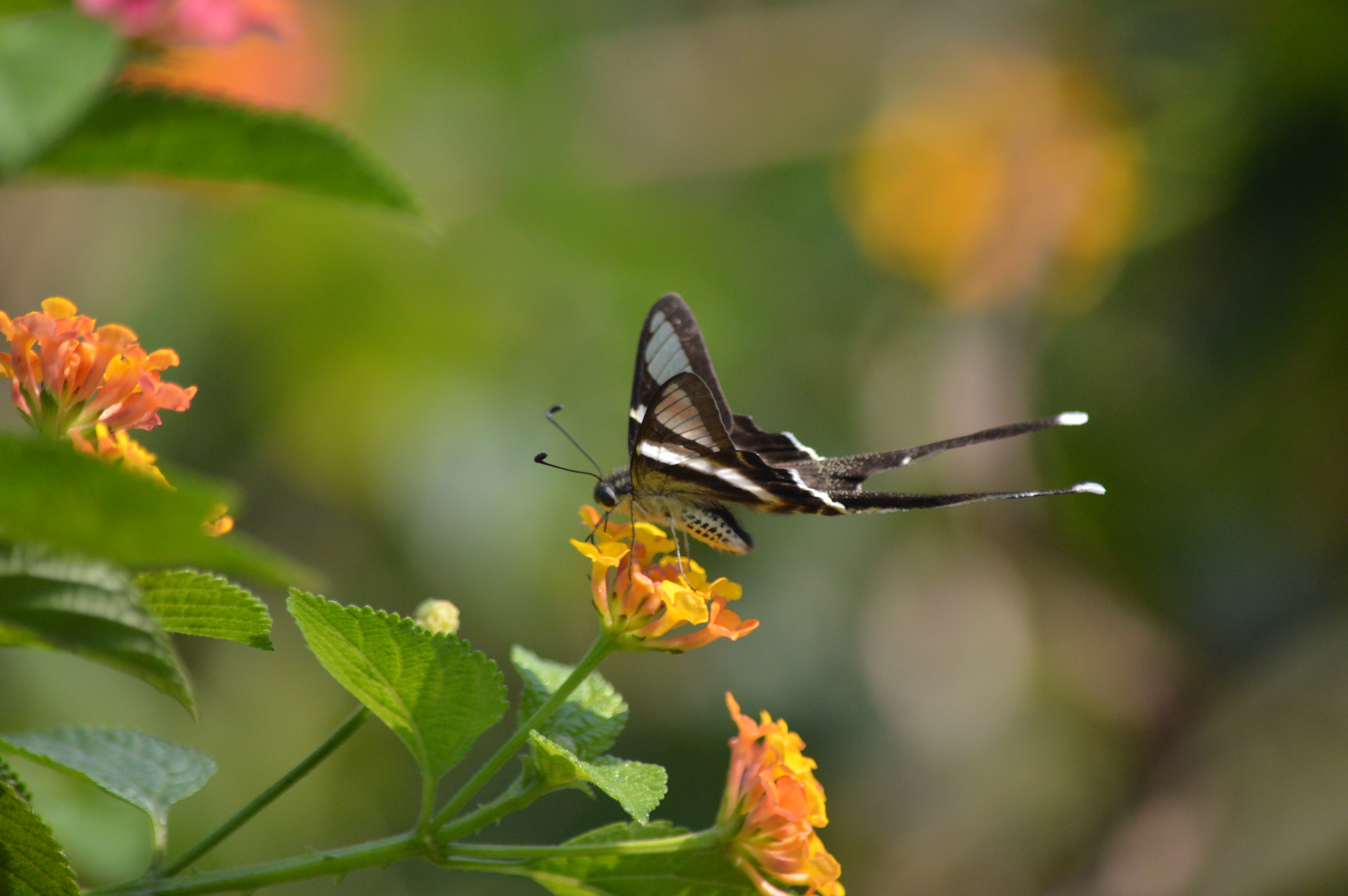
Lamproptera curius

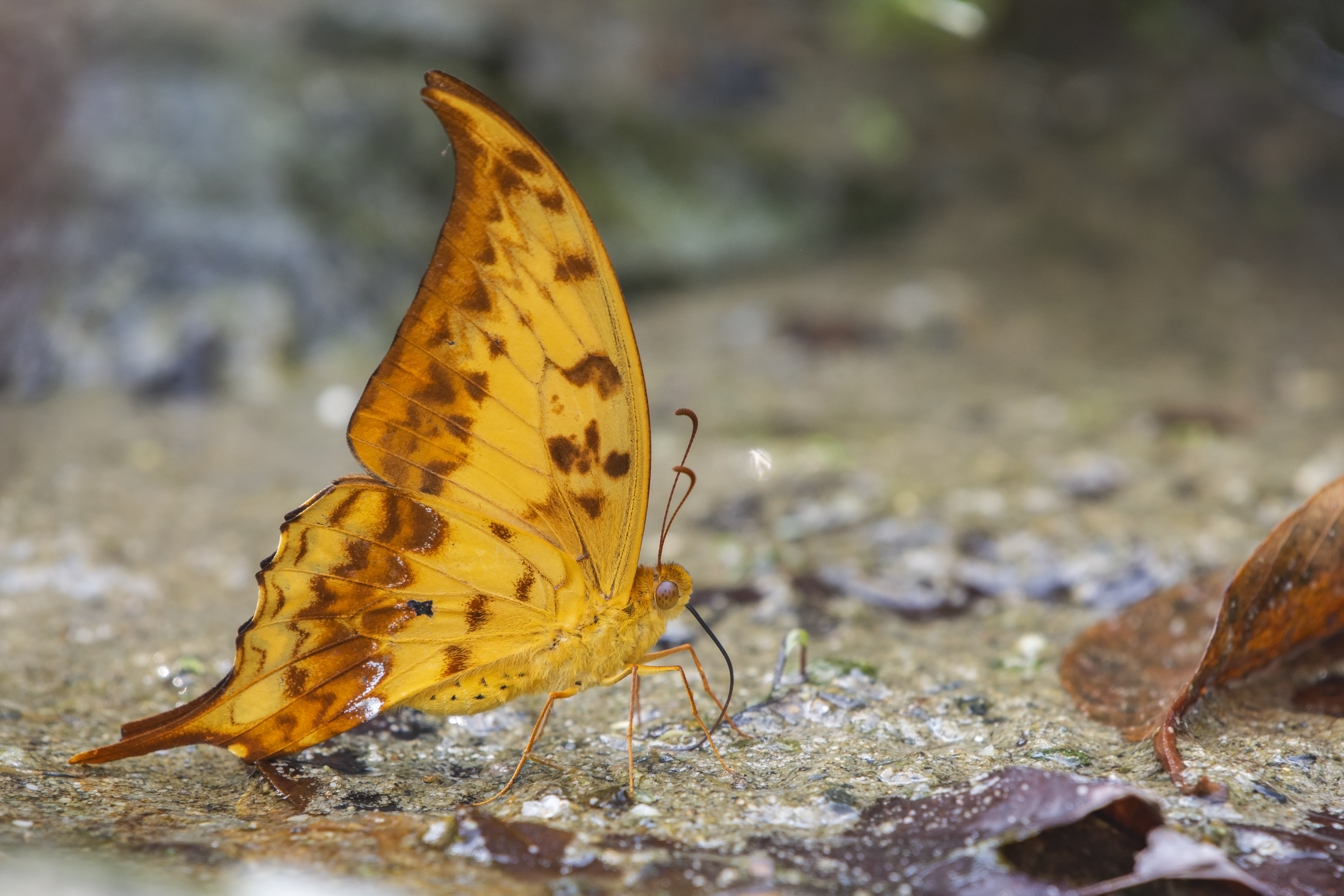
Meandrusa payeni

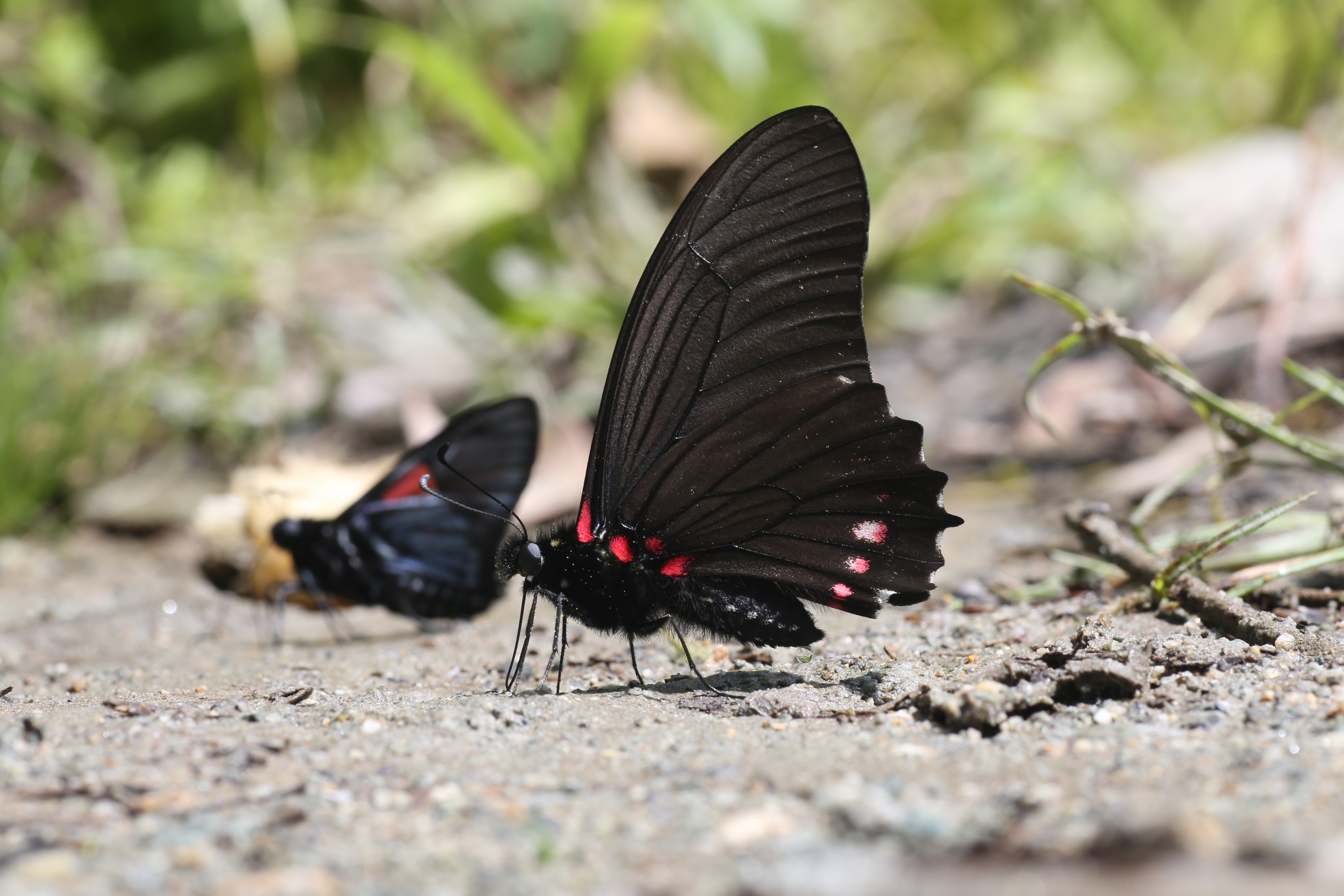
Mimoides xeniades

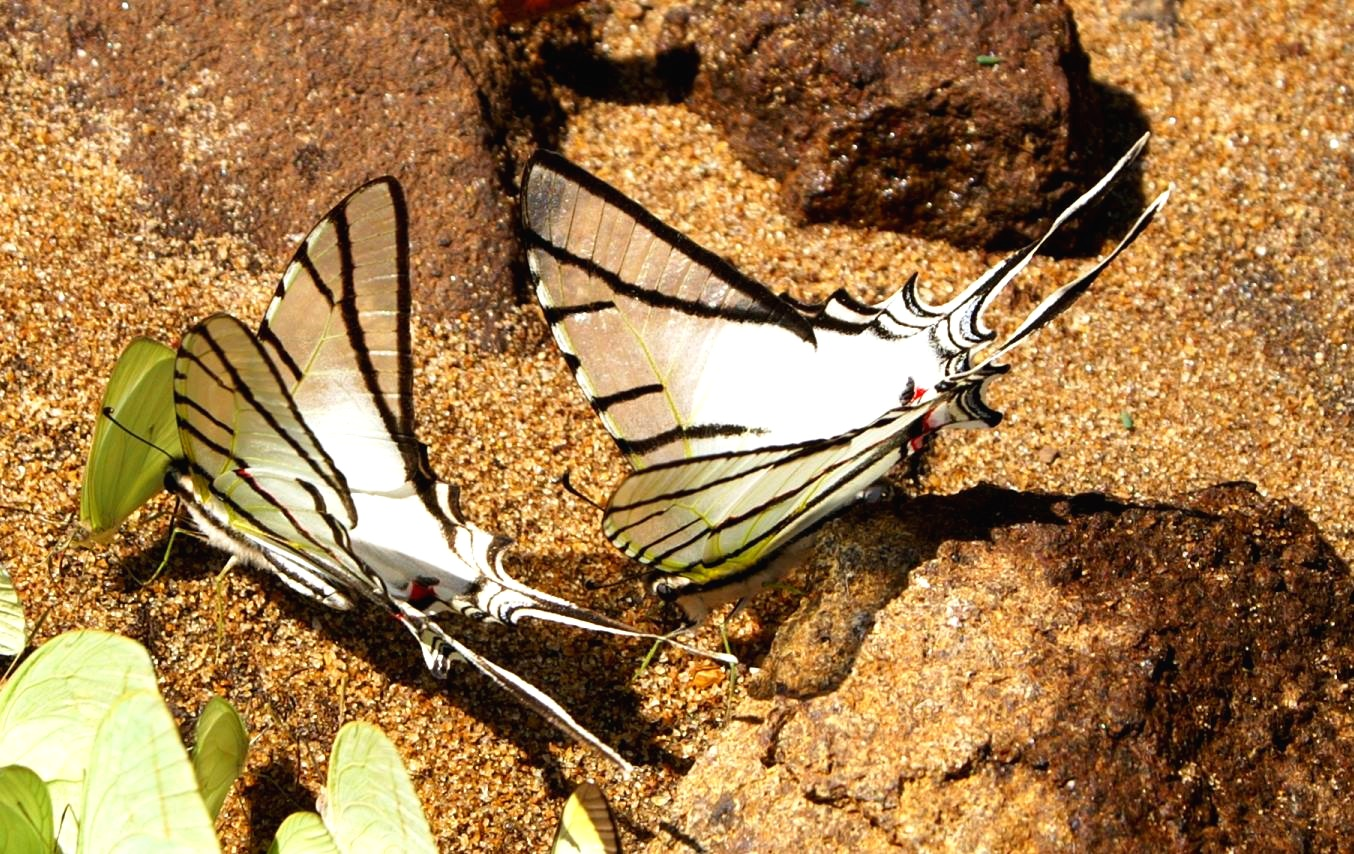
Protesilaus stenodesmus

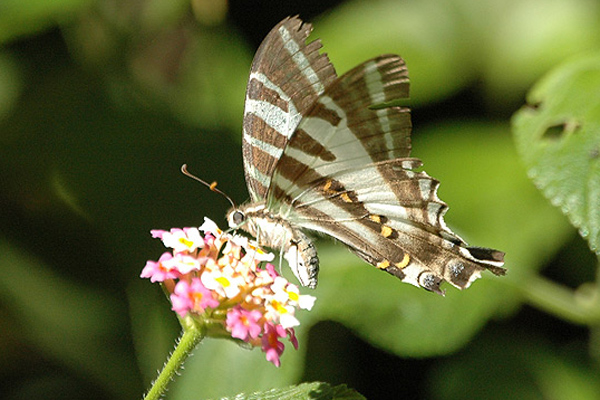
Protographium leosthenes

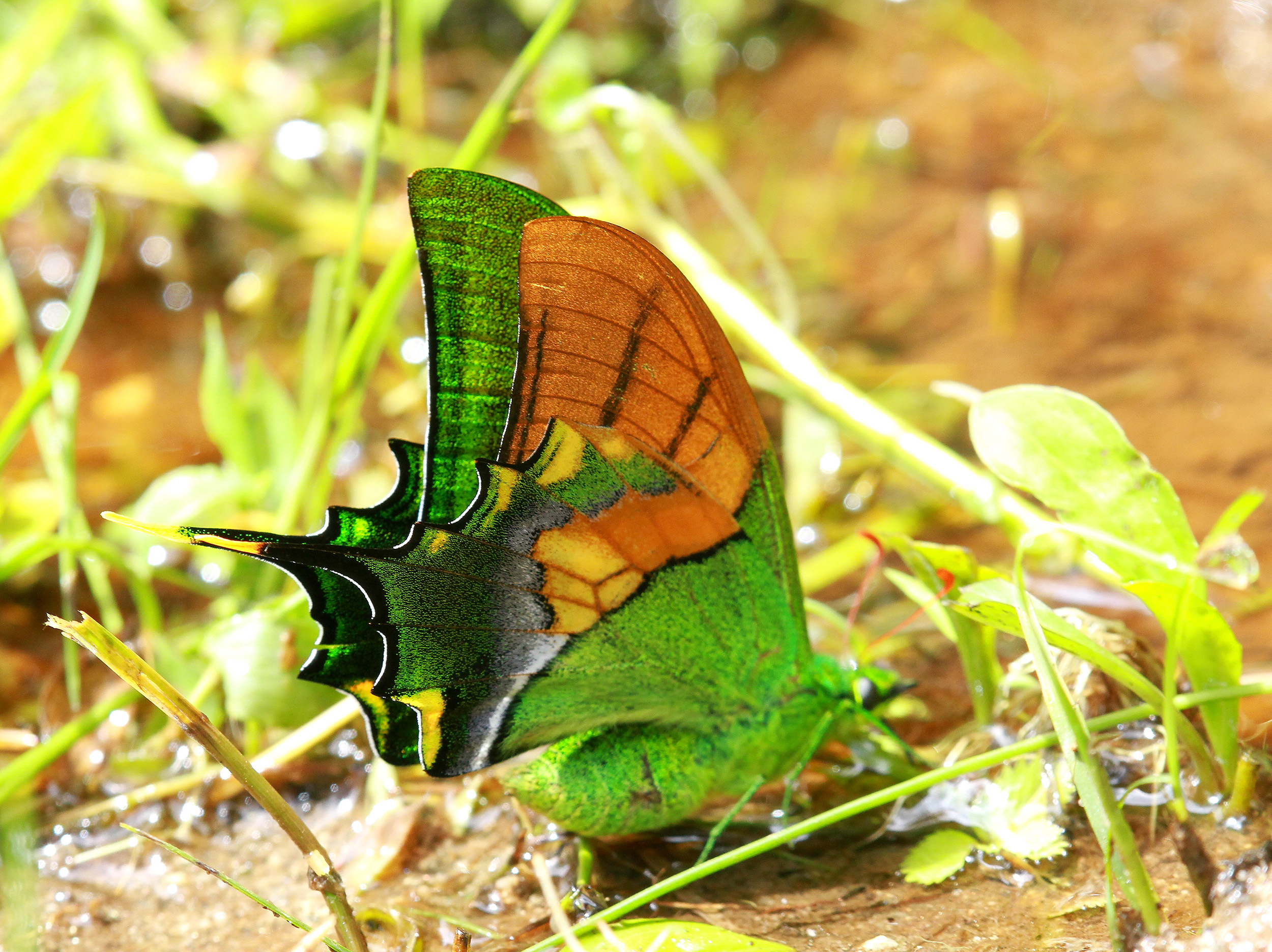
Teinopalpus imperialis
