= Dabasa ciminius =

Scientific classification
- Kingdom: Animalia
- Phylum: Arthropoda
- Class: Insecta
- Order: Lepidoptera
- Family: Papilionidae
- Genus: Dabasa
- Species: D. ciminius

Binomial name
- Dabasa ciminius Fruhstorfer, 1909

Species of butterfly

Dabasa ciminius is a species of butterfly in the family Papilionidae.

Other members of the genus Dabasa include:

- Dabasa amphis
- Dabasa arribas
- Dabasa brunei
- Dabasa evan
- Dabasa gyas
- Dabasa hegylus
- Dabasa lachinus
- Dabasa langsonensis
- Dabasa nagamasai
- Dabasa payeni
- Dabasa porus
- Dabasa sciron
