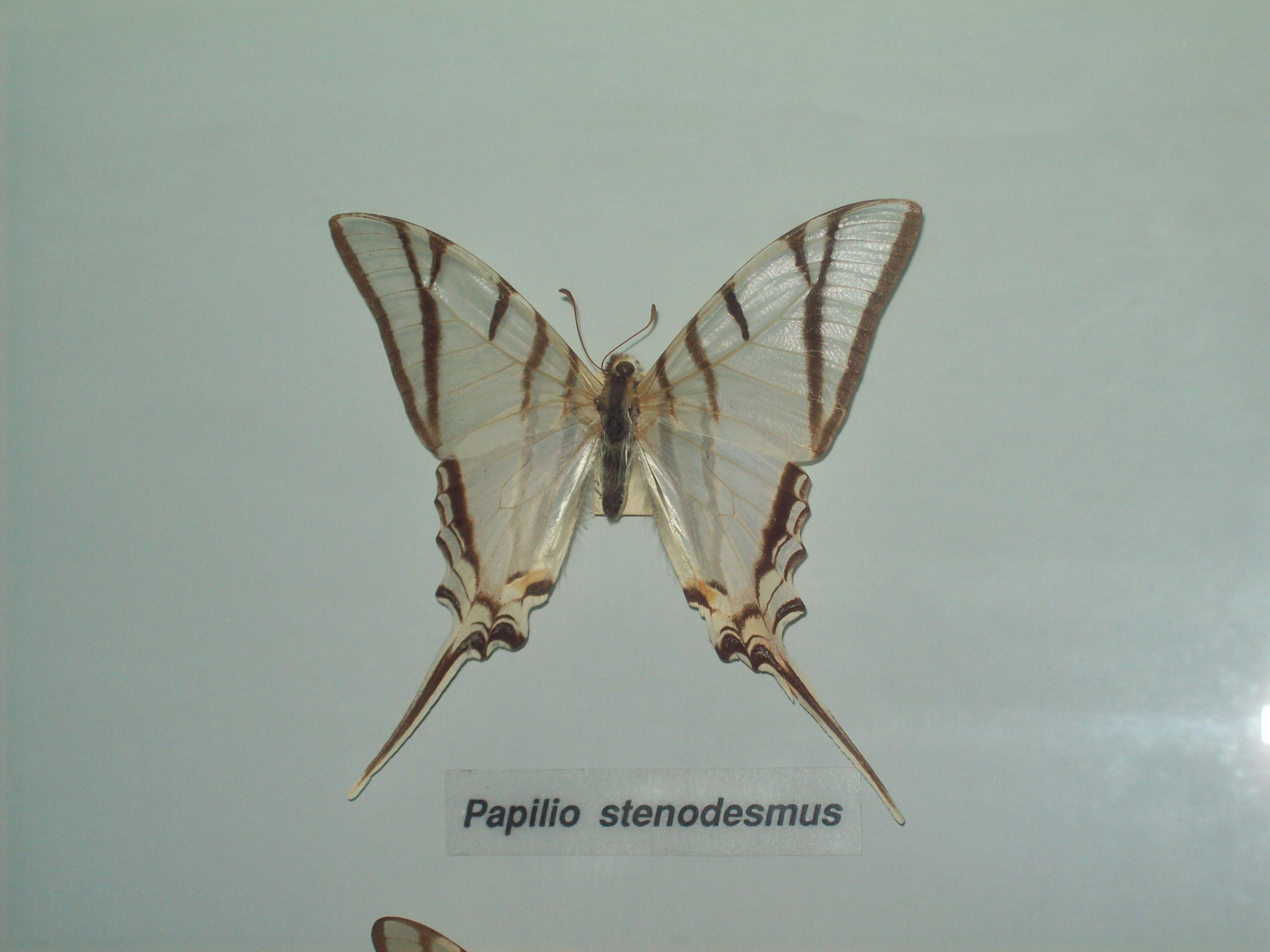

Scientific classification
- Kingdom: Animalia
- Phylum: Arthropoda
- Class: Insecta
- Order: Lepidoptera
- Family: Papilionidae
- Genus: Protesilaus
- Species: P. stenodesmus

Binomial name
- Protesilaus stenodesmus (Rothschild & Jordan, 1906)

Synonyms
- Papilio stenodesmus Rothschild & Jordan, 1906

= Protesilaus stenodesmus =

Species of butterfly

Protesilaus stenodesmus is a species of butterfly of the family Papilionidae. It was first described by Walter Rothschild and Karl Jordan in 1906. It is found in south-eastern Brazil, Paraguay and Argentina.

== Description ==
Antenna black. Frons laterally white. Forewing distally transparent, the bands thin, interspace between band 1 and 2 half as wide again as that between bands 2 and 3; hindwing longer than in Protesilaus protesilaus and Protesilaus telesilaus, usually slightly yellowish, strongly dentate, median band of the under surface somewhat curved, placed nearer to the extremity of the cell than in protesilaus and telesilaus. Dorsal edge of the harpe not dilated.

== Status ==
A common species, usually mistaken for Protesilaus protesilaus and P. telesilaus.
