= Protesilaus helios =

- Protesilaus helios and related species

Scientific classification
- Kingdom: Animalia
- Phylum: Arthropoda
- Clade: Pancrustacea
- Class: Insecta
- Order: Lepidoptera
- Family: Papilionidae
- Genus: Protesilaus
- Species: P. helios

Binomial name
- Protesilaus helios (Rothschild & Jordan, 1906)

Synonyms
- Papilio helios Rothschild & Jordan, 1906; Papilio helios f. sexfasciatus Hoffmann, 1934; Papilio jordani Zikán, 1937 (preocc. Fruhstorfer, 1906); Papilio rothschildianus Zikán, 1937 (preocc. Fruhstorfer, 1909); Papilio fuscicornis Zikán, 1938; Papilio gualterius Zikán, 1938

Species of butterfly

Protesilaus helios is a species of butterfly of the family Papilionidae. It is found in the Neotropical realm.

== Description ==
Antenna and frons brownish black as in Protesilaus protesilaus nigricornis. Wings brownish; forewing transparent; hindwing more sharply dentate than in Protesilaus protesilaus nigricornis, the black postdiscal band straight, not interrupted posteriorly as in the Protesilaus protesilaus forms, the marginal and submarginal bands yellowish. Under surface more yellow than upper; the red line of the hindwing distally edged with white. Dorsal edge of the harpe not dilated into a large tooth, the apex of the harpe pointed, ventral process not denticulate.

== Distribution ==
It is found in southern Brazil (Paraná, Santa Catarina, São Paulo and Rio de Janeiro) and Argentina.
