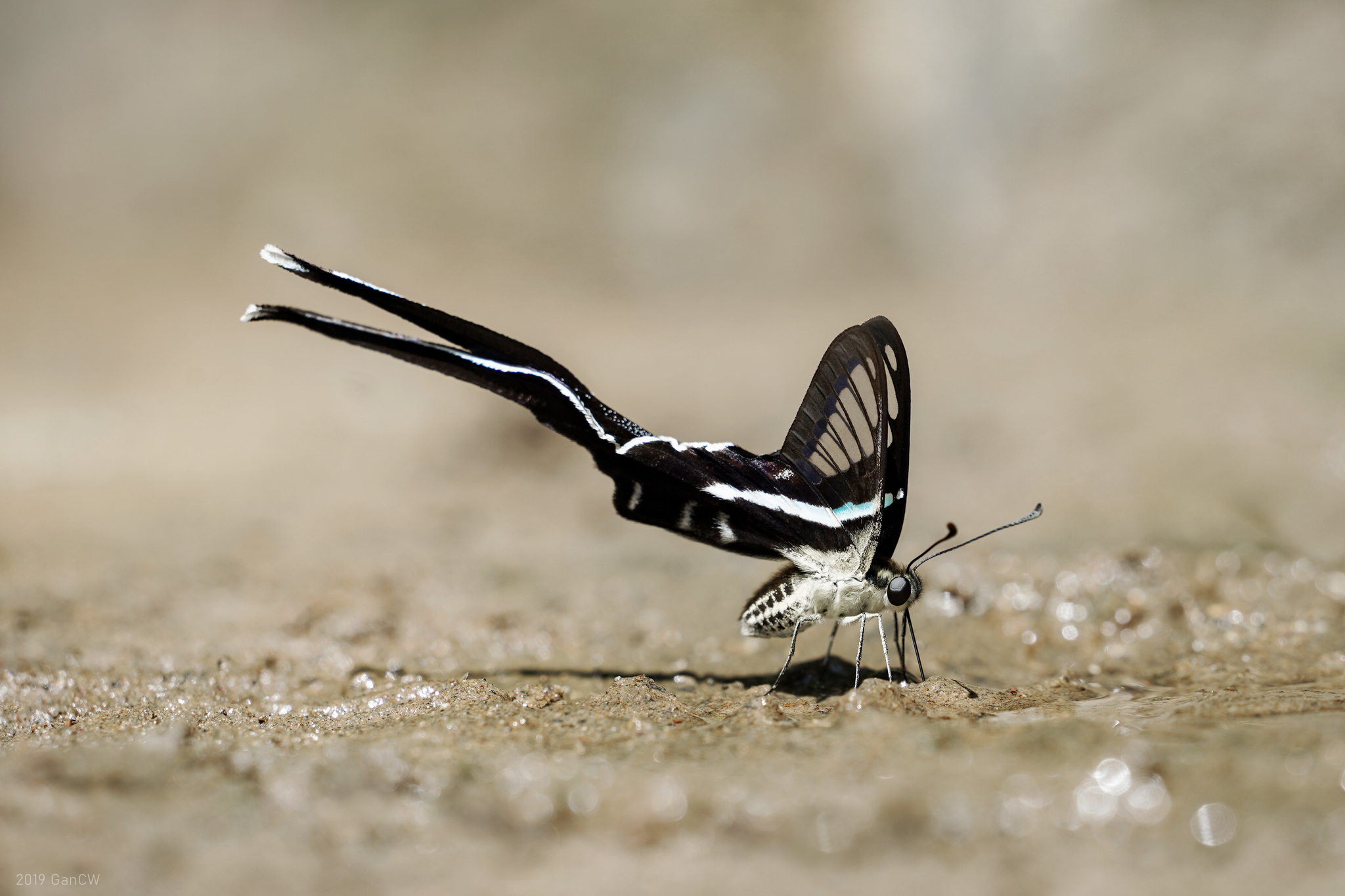

Scientific classification
- Kingdom: Animalia
- Phylum: Arthropoda
- Clade: Pancrustacea
- Class: Insecta
- Order: Lepidoptera
- Family: Papilionidae
- Genus: Lamproptera
- Species: L. meges

Binomial name
- Lamproptera meges (Zinken-Sommer, 1831)

= Lamproptera meges =

Green dragontail

Species of butterfly

Lamproptera meges, the green dragontail, is a species of swallowtail butterfly (family Papilionidae) found in parts of South Asia and Southeast Asia. There are ten subspecies. A specimen from Java is the type species of the genus Lamproptera.

== Description ==
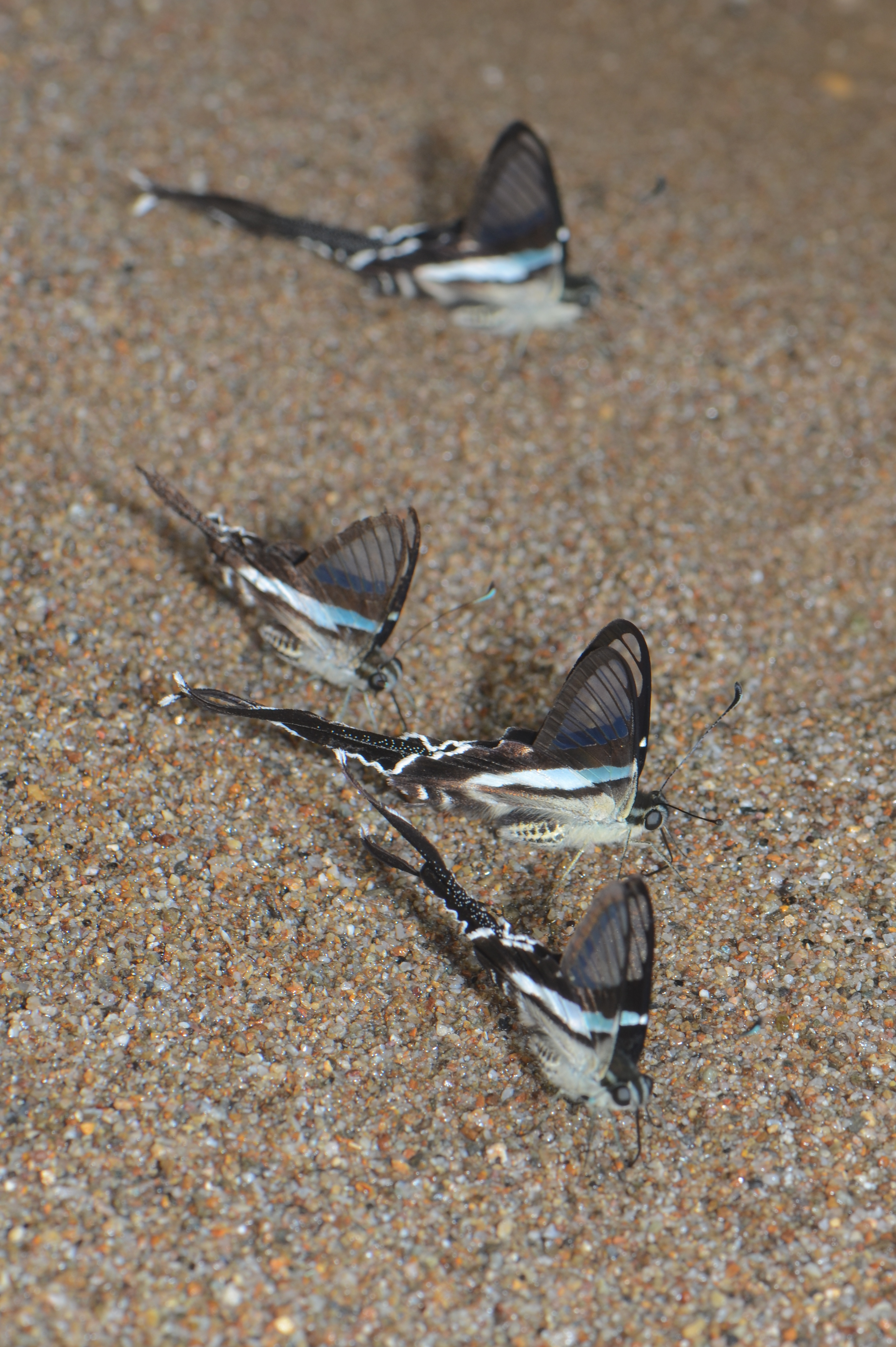
Mud-puddling green dragontails showing underside.

A small butterfly, the green dragontail has a wingspan of 40 to 55 millimetres (1.6 to 2.2 in). It is basically black and white in colour scheme, it has a very large white-tipped tail, 25 to 40 millimetres (0.98 to 1.57 in) long. The forewing has a triangular hyaline (glass-like) patch with black borders, and thin black stripes along the veins, forming six to eight spot/bands. It also has a pale band running obliquely across the pre-discal area. This band is continued onto the black hindwing which bears the long tail and prominent abdominal wing fold. In this species, the pale bands are light green while in its closely related species, Lamproptera curius, they are white. Also in L. curius, the white band has a hyaline outer edge. Sexes are alike, but the female is duller and has a ventral copulation groove before the tip of the abdomen. The males of this species do not have the sex mark (scent organ) found in L. curius.

== Distribution ==
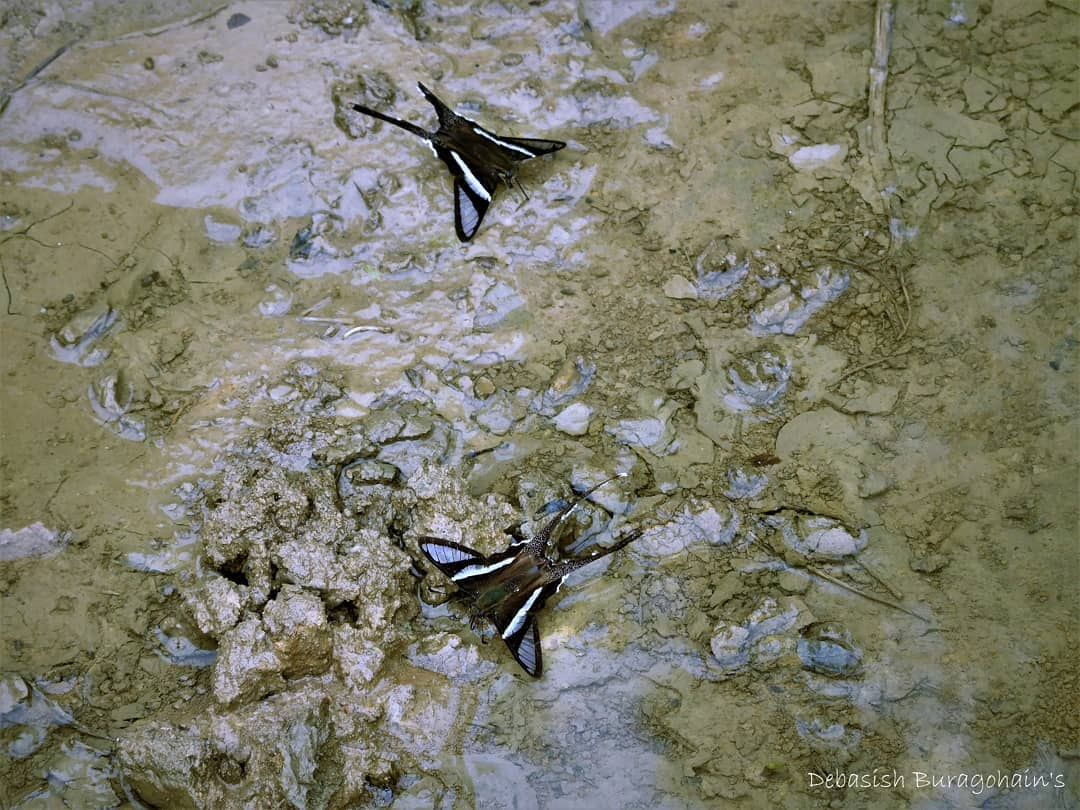
A pair of White Dragontail butterfly in Nameri National Park

The butterfly is found in northeastern India, in the states of Assam, Arunachal Pradesh, Manipur and Nagaland. It is also found in Myanmar, Thailand, Laos, Vietnam, southern China (including Hainan), Cambodia, peninsular and eastern Malaysia, the Indonesian archipelago, Brunei, and the Philippines. In Indonesia, it is found on the islands of Sulawesi, Kalimantan, Nias, Bangka and Java. In 2006, it was reported from Zhangjiajie of Hunan Province.

== Subspecies ==
- Lamproptera meges meges Sumatra, Java, Borneo
- Lamproptera meges ennius (C. & R. Felder, 1865) northern Sulawesi, central Sulawesi
- Lamproptera meges akirai Tsukada & Nishiyama, 1980 southern Sulawesi
- Lamproptera meges virescens (Butler, [1870]) Burma, Vietnam, Thailand, Peninsular Malaysia, Hainan
- Lamproptera meges annamiticus (Fruhstorfer, 1909) eastern Thailand, southern Vietnam
- Lamproptera meges pallidus (Fruhstorfer, 1909) northern Vietnam
- Lamproptera meges niasicus (Fruhstorfer, 1909) Nias
- Lamproptera meges decius (C. & R. Felder, 1862) Philippines
- Lamproptera meges pessimus Fruhstorfer, 1909 Philippines (Palawan, Balabac, Dumaran)
- Lamproptera meges amplifascia Tytler, 1939 Yunnan, Burma

== Status ==
The green dragontail is not known to be threatened in most of its range but is considered vulnerable and in need of protection in peninsular Malaysia.

In a study of swallowtail assemblages in Rani-Garbhanga Reserve Forest in Assam in 2003 and 2004, dragontails (Lamproptera species) were found to have one of the lowest mean abundances; both L. meges and L. curius being found in gaps (open patches) as well as in closed forest. A 2004 report had earlier suggested that the status of the green dragontail in Garbhanga Reserve Forest was "very rare"; later a total of 108 butterflies of genus Lamproptera were seen during the 2003 and 2004 survey, the species-wise breakdown not being published.

== Habits ==
Among the smallest of swallowtails in India, the green dragontail is usually found singly along open sunlit patches, almost always near streams and water courses. It may also be seen in small groups, usually twos or threes. It flies in an altitude range of 100 to 1,520 metres (330 to 4,990 ft). It flies from April to October. Having much smaller wing size to body length ratio, the butterflies have a whirring flight, rapidly beat their wings and dart back and forth in a manner reminiscent of dragonflies, their long tails acting as rudders. Male dragontails suck up a lot of water from which the dissolved minerals are filtered and the water squirted from the anus. While feeding they vibrate their wings rapidly but pause from time to time. Occasionally, they rest on leaves of bushes with wings outspread and stationary.

=== Life cycle ===
The eggs are pale green, spherical, smooth, almost transparent and resemble the eggs of other swallowtails. The caterpillar is dark green in colour and is spotted with black. The chrysalis is attached to the upper surface of a leaf by the cremaster.

=== Food plants ===
Illigera burmanica King (family Hernandiaceae). In the Philippines, the butterfly has also been recorded from Zanthoxylum species (Rutaceae).

== See also ==
- List of butterflies of India (Papilionidae)
