= Protesilaus leucosilaus =

Scientific classification
- Kingdom: Animalia
- Phylum: Arthropoda
- Class: Insecta
- Order: Lepidoptera
- Family: Papilionidae
- Genus: Protesilaus
- Species: P. leucosilaus

Binomial name
- Protesilaus leucosilaus (J. Zikán, 1937)

Synonyms
- Papilio leucosilaus Zikán, 1937; Eurytides leucosilaus

Species of butterfly

Protesilaus leucosilaus is a species of butterfly found in the Neotropical realm only in Amazonas, Brazil.

== Taxonomy ==
May be a subspecies of Protesilaus molops.
