= Protesilaus aguiari =

Scientific classification
- Kingdom: Animalia
- Phylum: Arthropoda
- Class: Insecta
- Order: Lepidoptera
- Family: Papilionidae
- Genus: Protesilaus
- Species: P. aguiari

Binomial name
- Protesilaus aguiari (d'Almeida, 1937)

Synonyms
- Iphiclides aguiari d'Almeida, 1937; Papilio aristosilaus Zikán, 1937

Species of butterfly

Protesilaus aguiari is a species of butterfly found in the Neotropical realm in the Brazilian states of Pará and Amazonas.

== Status ==
No known threats.
