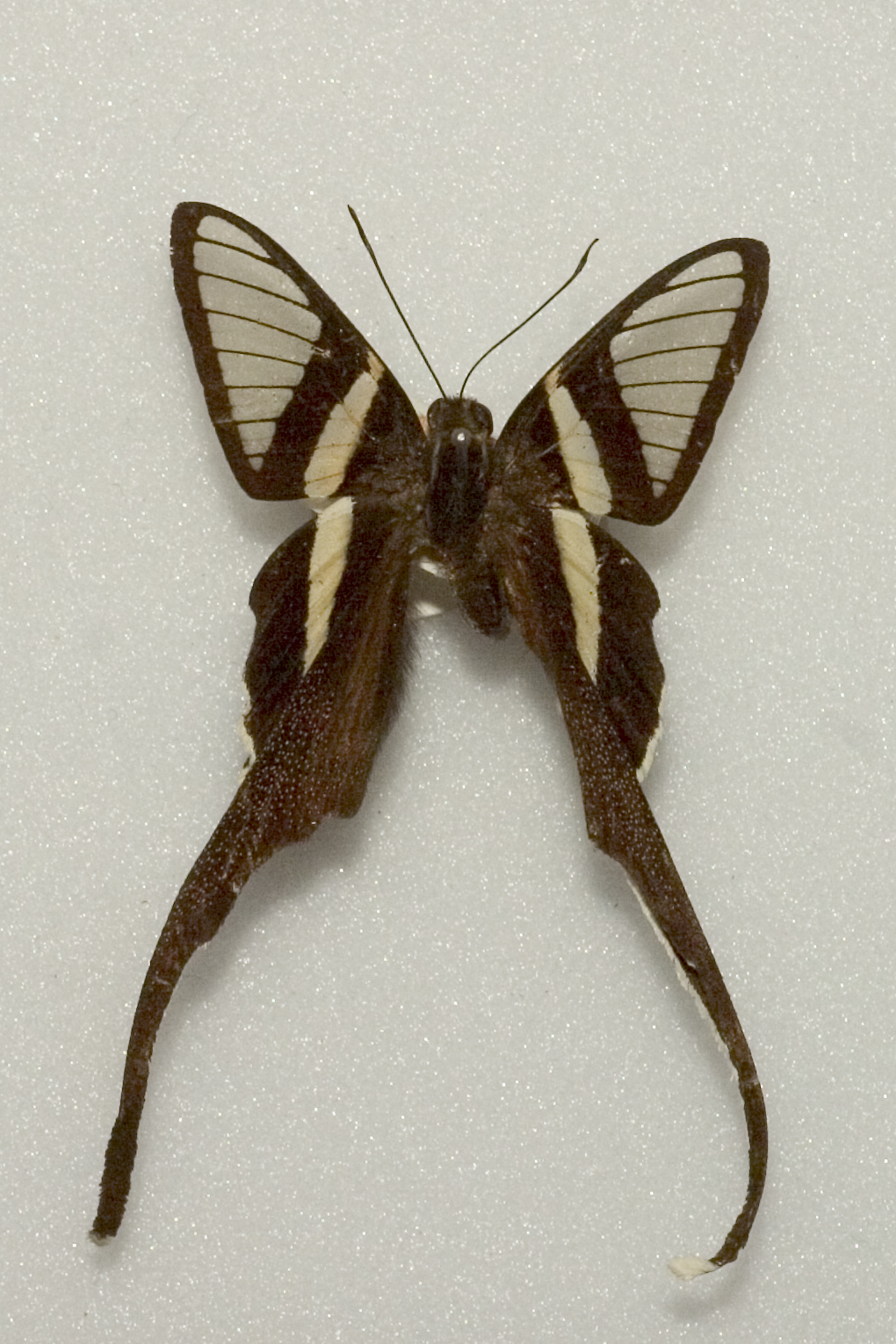
- Lamproptera meges (Ulster Museum)

Scientific classification
- Kingdom: Animalia
- Phylum: Arthropoda
- Class: Insecta
- Order: Lepidoptera
- Family: Papilionidae
- Tribe: Leptocircini
- Genus: Lamproptera; Gray, 1832

Synonyms
- Leptocircus Swainson, 1833

= Lamproptera =

Genus of butterflies

Lamproptera is a genus of butterflies in the family Papilionidae and the tribe Leptocircini.

== Species ==
Image	Scientific name	Common name	Distribution
	Lamproptera curius (Fabricius, 1787)	white dragontail	Thailand, Laos, Vietnam, southern China, Kampuchea, Malaysia, Indonesia, Brunei, and the Philippines. India from Assam to Burma
	Lamproptera meges (Zinken, 1831)	green dragontail	India, in the states of Assam, Arunachal Pradesh, Manipur and Nagaland, Myanmar, Thailand, Laos, Vietnam, southern China (including Hainan), Cambodia, peninsular and eastern Malaysia, the Indonesian archipelago, Brunei, and the Philippines.
