= Protesilaus orthosilaus =

- P. orthosilaus and related species in Adalbert Seitz's Fauna Americana

Scientific classification
- Kingdom: Animalia
- Phylum: Arthropoda
- Clade: Pancrustacea
- Class: Insecta
- Order: Lepidoptera
- Family: Papilionidae
- Genus: Protesilaus
- Species: P. orthosilaus

Binomial name
- Protesilaus orthosilaus (Weymer, 1899)

Synonyms
- Papilio orthosilaus Weymer, 1899; Papilio ampliornatus Röber, 1925

Species of butterfly

Protesilaus orthosilaus is a species of butterfly found in the Neotropical realm (the Mato Grosso of Brazil and also Paraguay).

== Description ==
Antenna yellow-brown, not black. Frons yellowish white at the sides. Forewing transparent: hindwing strongly dentate, above also with a median band, the postdiscal band and the black margin merged into a broad marginal band, the yellowish marginal and submarginal lunules smaller. Paraguay and Gojaz in Brazil; rare.

== Status ==
Formerly believed to be rare, but has now been seen to occur over a very wide area of the Mato Grosso where it can be seen year round in the cerrado. Males are found in sandy areas and females seek nectar.
