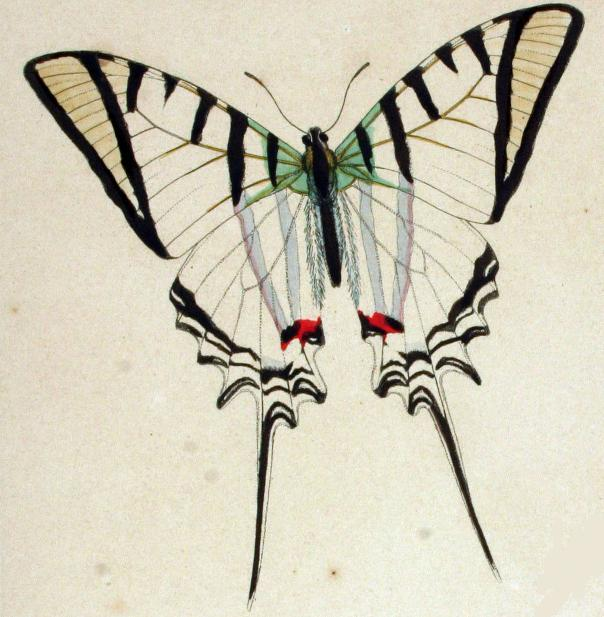

Scientific classification
- Kingdom: Animalia
- Phylum: Arthropoda
- Clade: Pancrustacea
- Class: Insecta
- Order: Lepidoptera
- Family: Papilionidae
- Genus: Protesilaus
- Species: P. protesilaus

Binomial name
- Protesilaus protesilaus (Linnaeus, 1758)

Synonyms
- Papilio protesilaus Linnaeus, 1758; Papilio leilus Swainson, 1832; Papilio theogenus Ehrmann, 1919; Iphiclides (Papilio) embrikstrandi d'Almeida, 1936; Papilio nigrifrons Zikán, 1937; Papilio pseudosilaus Zikán, 1937; Iphiclides travassosi d'Almeida, 1938; Papilio agathosilaus Zikán, 1938; Papilio protesilaus dariensis Rothschild & Jordan, 1906; Papilio protesilaus var. macrosilaus Boisduval, 1870; Papilio diotimus Ehrmann, 1919; Papilio archesilaus C. & R. Felder, 1865; Papilio archesilaus C. & R. Felder, 1864; Papilio protesilaus rubrocinctus Eimer, 1889; Papilio pumilus Röber, 1926; Papilio (Cosmodesmus) ab. reducta Dufrane, 1946; Papilio protesilaus var. nigricornis Staudinger, 1884

= Protesilaus protesilaus =

Species of butterfly

Protesilaus protesilaus is a species of butterfly of the family Papilionidae. It is found in the Neotropical realm.

Protesilaus protesilaus and related species

== Diagnostic characters ==
Bands one and two of the hindwing usually extend beyond the second submedian, band four mostly goes beyond the middle of the cell and sometimes reaches to its hinder margin, the transparent submarginal band has at least in the costal third brownish scales; hindwing more strongly dentate than in Protesilaus glaucolaus leucas. Frons in specimens from the Andes often entirely brownish black. Dorsal edge of the harpe dilated into a tooth, which is sometimes absent in specimens from the Andes. Submarginal spots of the hindwing white, rarely slightly yellowish, hindwing more strongly dentate than in Protesilaus glaucolaus, the first and second bands of the forewing on the whole shorter than in Protesilaus molops. Frons sometimes entirety brown black. The scent-scales very long and thin. The dorsal edge of the harpe deflexed, lying flat on the harpe, strongly dentate.

== Subspecies ==
- P. p. protesilaus Venezuela - Bolivia, Peru, Brazil ( São Paulo, Rio de Janeiro )
- P. p. dariensis (Rothschild & Jordan, 1906) Costa Rica, Panama Dorsal line of the abdomen broad, the margin of the hindwing between costa and first radial entirely or almost entirely black. The dilated part of the dorsal edge of the harpe distally with triangular tooth, ventral process denticulate from the base to the tip. Very similar to [ssp.] archesilaus, forewing at the base broader green, the black bands somewhat thinner, band one not extending beyond the second submedian, band four rarely reaching to the second cell fold; hindwing less strongly dentate than in archesilaus, the subbasal band of the forewing beneath narrower. Wings of the female slightly yellowish, especially the anal region of the hindwing.
- P. p. archesilaus (C. & R. Felder, 1865) Peru, Colombia On the whole considerably larger than protesilaus, hindwing more strongly dentate, the apex of the cell of the hindwing beneath more or less edged with red.
- P. p. nigricornis (Staudinger, 1884) Paraguay, Brazil (São Paulo, ...) Antenna usually black; frons brownish black, not white at the sides. Dorsal edge of the harpe with large tooth.

== Biology ==
The larva feeds on Annona.
