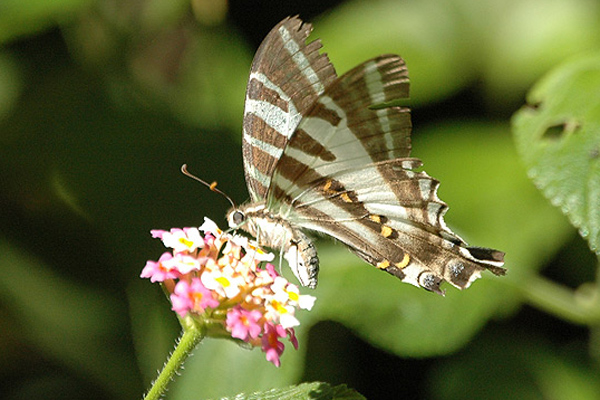
- Protographium leosthenes

Scientific classification
- Kingdom: Animalia
- Phylum: Arthropoda
- Clade: Pancrustacea
- Class: Insecta
- Order: Lepidoptera
- Family: Papilionidae
- Tribe: Leptocircini
- Genus: Protographium; Munroe, 1961

Synonyms
- [see Eurytides]: Neographium Möhn, 2002; Asiographium Möhn, 2002; Eurygraphium Möhn, 2002

= Protographium =

Genus of butterflies

Protographium is genus of Australian and Neotropical swallowtail butterflies in the subfamily Papilioninae.

== Taxonomy ==
Related to Old World genus Graphium. The classification of species in the genus Protographium is undergoing changes as New World representatives have been re-classified under Eurytides by most authors.

subgenus: Protographium
- Protographium leosthenes (Doubleday, 1846)

== See also ==
- Graphium
- Eurytides
