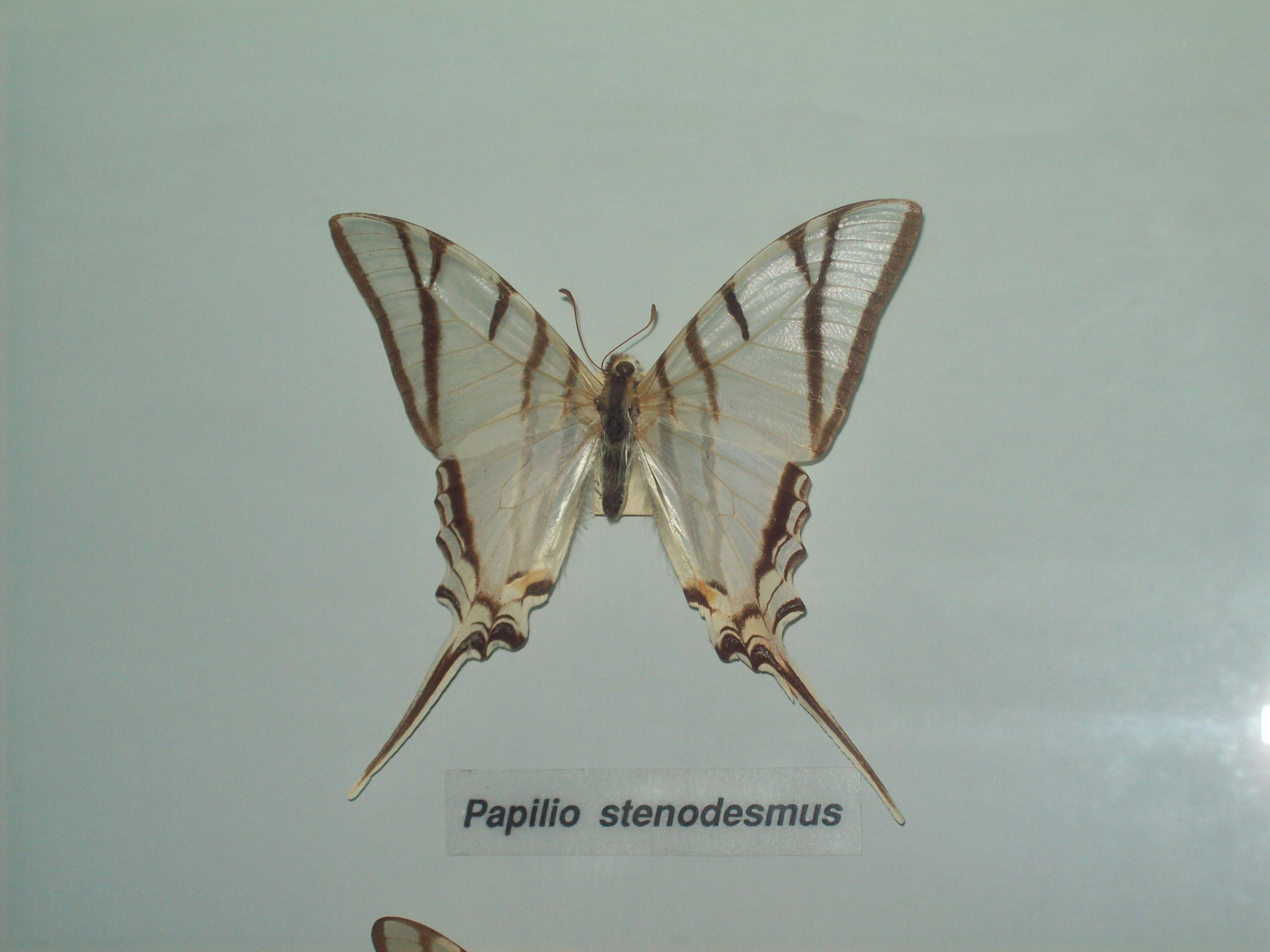
- Protesilaus stenodesmus

Scientific classification
- Kingdom: Animalia
- Phylum: Arthropoda
- Class: Insecta
- Order: Lepidoptera
- Family: Papilionidae
- Tribe: Leptocircini
- Genus: Protesilaus; Swainson, [1832]

Species
- See text

Synonyms
- Cosmodesmus Haase, [1891]

= Protesilaus (butterfly) =

Genus of butterflies

Protesilaus is a genus of butterflies in the family Papilionidae. They are native to the Americas.

== Species ==
- Protesilaus aguiari (d'Almeida, 1937)
- Protesilaus earis (Rothschild & Jordan, 1906) - Rothschild's swordtail
- Protesilaus glaucolaus (H. W. Bates, 1864) - Bates' swordtail
- Protesilaus helios (Rothschild & Jordan, 1906)
- Protesilaus leucosilaus (J. Zikán, 1937)
- Protesilaus macrosilaus (Gray, [1853])
- Protesilaus molops (Rothschild& and Jordan, 1906)
- Protesilaus orthosilaus (Weymer, 1899)
- Protesilaus protesilaus (Linnaeus, 1758)
- Protesilaus stenodesmus (Rothschild & Jordan, 1906)
- Protesilaus telesilaus (C. Felder & R. Felder, 1864) - telesilaus kite
