= Protesilaus earis =

- P. earis and related species in Adalbert Seitz's Fauna Americana

Scientific classification
- Kingdom: Animalia
- Phylum: Arthropoda
- Clade: Pancrustacea
- Class: Insecta
- Order: Lepidoptera
- Family: Papilionidae
- Genus: Protesilaus
- Species: P. earis

Binomial name
- Protesilaus earis (Rothschild & Jordan, 1906)

Synonyms
- Papilio earis Rothschild & Jordan, 1906; Graphium earis; Eurytides earis

Species of butterfly

Protesilaus earis, the Rothschild's swordtail, is a species of butterfly found in the Neotropical realm (southeast Brazil, Paraguay, Argentina).

== Description ==
Antenna dark yellowish brown. Frons yellowish at the sides. Wings slightly yellowish, beneath slightly reddish; bands narrow, 4. band of the forewing reduced to a small spot, 6. band close to the lower angle of the cell; the yellowish marginal and submarginal spots of the hindwing narrow, above and beneath smaller than in the name-typical protesilaus; hindwing beneath with long arrow-shaped patch before the abdominal margin, this patch reduced in protesilaus. Dorsal margin of the harpe slightly widened, ventral process non-dentate, not extending to the lower edge of the clasper, central process short, broad, spatulate, strongly dentate. Eastern Ecuador, widely distributed.

== Status ==
Uncommon and little known. No known threats.
