= Protesilaus molops =

- P. m. hetaerius and related species in Adalbert Seitz's Fauna Americana

Scientific classification
- Kingdom: Animalia
- Phylum: Arthropoda
- Clade: Pancrustacea
- Class: Insecta
- Order: Lepidoptera
- Family: Papilionidae
- Genus: Protesilaus
- Species: P. molops

Binomial name
- Protesilaus molops (Rothschild & Jordan, 1906)

Synonyms
- Papilio molops Rothschild & Jordan, 1906; Papilio molops hetaerius Rothschild & Jordan, 1906; Papilio molops megalurus Rothschild & Jordan, 1906

Species of butterfly

Protesilaus molops is a species of butterfly found in the Neotropical realm.

== Subspecies ==
- P. m. molops Ecuador, Colombia
- P. m. hetaerius (Rothschild & Jordan, 1906) Colombia, Guyana, Peru, Suriname, Ecuador, Bolivia, Brazil
- P. m. megalurus (Rothschild & Jordan, 1906) Brazil (Minas Gerais)

== Description ==
The 1. and 2. black band of the forewing broad and both or at least one of them extending to the hindmargin, the 4. band usually reaching quite across the cell. The denticulate, deflexed dorsal margin of the harpe rounded-dilated. Tropical South America, widely distributed, but only singly among the white butterflies of this group.

molops R & J Antenna brownish yellow; the black lateral stripe of the abdomen as broad as the yellow-white stripe placed at its dorsal side; 1. and 2. band of the forewing broad, the 1. not extending to the hindmargin, the other bands likewise broad, the 6. especially is broader than in all the other forms of the protesilaus group, being at least as broad as the inter-space between bands 5 and 6; this 6. band close to the lower angle of the cell. Dorsal margin of the harpe abruptly dilated. North-west Ecuador and west Colombia.

hetaerius R & J Easy to differentiate from the preceding form by the thinner black bands; it is so similar to the protesilaus forms occurring together with hetaerius as to be easily mistaken for them, but is much smaller than the Colombian protesilaus and has a much less sharply dentate hindwing. Sides of the frons always white; 1. and 2. band of the forewing extending to the hindmargin, or the 2. band very little abbreviated; the white submarginal lunule between the 1. and 2. radial of the hindwing narrower than the corresponding marginal lunule; the interspace between the subbasal and median band on the under surface of the hindwing longer than in protesilaus. Harpe somewhat different from the harpe of molops, dorsal and ventral edges more denticulate, the ventral process longer and curved towards the ventral edge of the clasper. Guiana, Amazons, Colombia, Ecuador (except the western side), Peru and Bolivia.

megalurus R & J Antenna black as in the Brazilian protesilaus: frons laterally white; the white subdorsal line of the abdomen thin; 1. and 2. band of the forewing extend to the hindmargin, 6. band separated from the angle of the cell; the black markings of the hindwing somewhat more developed than in hetaerius, the red anal spot longer; tail long and broad. Dorsal edge of the harpe less dilated than in the other forms of molops. Brazil: Leopoldina, but probably more widely distributed.

== Taxonomy ==
Difficult to separate from Protesilaus glaucolaus. hetaerius R & transferred to P. macrosilaus and replaced in P. molops by leucosilaus (Zikan) by Hancock
