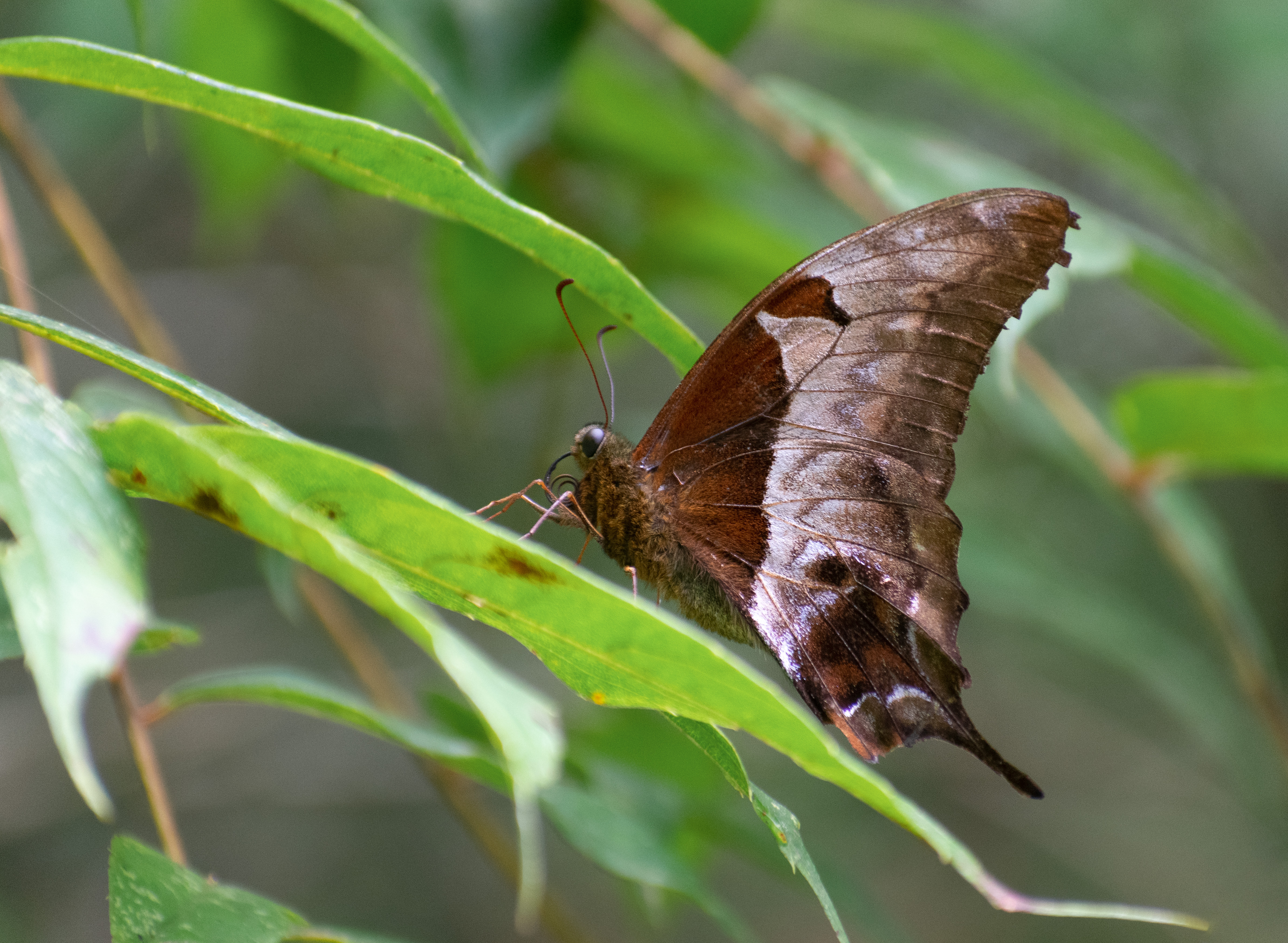
- Meandrusa lachinus
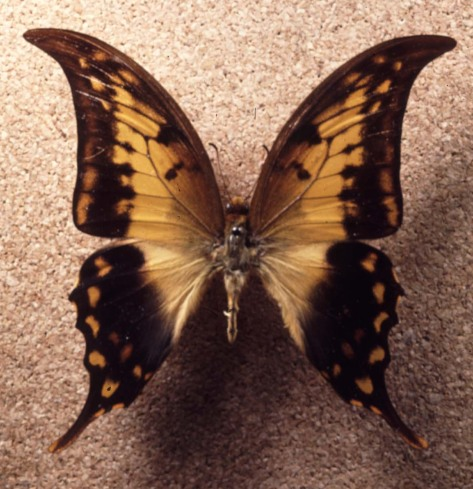
- Meandrusa payeni ulster

Scientific classification
- Kingdom: Animalia
- Phylum: Arthropoda
- Clade: Pancrustacea
- Class: Insecta
- Order: Lepidoptera
- Family: Papilionidae
- Subfamily: Papilioninae
- Tribe: Leptocircini
- Genus: Meandrusa; Moore, 1888

Synonyms
- Dabasa Moore, 1888

= Meandrusa =

Genus of butterflies

Meandrusa is a genus of swallowtail butterflies within Papilioninae subfamily. They are native to countries in South and Southeast Asia, mostly found in habitats with forests or mountains that have a lot of vegetation. Meandrusa are recognized by their shapes and colors. Their wings are long and narrow at the bottom, giving them the appearance of having a tail that resembles a hook or a sickle. Meandrusa are usually recognized by their colors as well, they usually range between gold/yellow, and brown colors that help them survive by blending with the environment around them. Throughout Southeast and South Asia, 4 different species of Meandrusa are found: Meandrusa gyas, Meandrusa lachinus, Meandrusa sciron, and Meandrusa payeni.

== Species ==
- Meandrusa gyas (Westwood, 1841) – brown gorgon
- Meandrusa lachinus (Fruhstorfer, 1902)
- Meandrusa payeni (Boisduval, 1836) – yellow gorgon
- Meandrusa sciron (Leech, 1890) – Eastern brown gorgon

== Taxonomy and systematics ==
The discussion surrounding Meandrusa and its place in the swallowtail family has been going on for many years. Discussions between experts show that there has been a long history of not knowing where exactly Meandrusa fits. Early on, Meandrusa was often thought to be closer to the genus Teinopalpus because of their similarities in the way they look. As time went on, research showed that Meandrusa did not seem to fit in with the other tribes of the Teinopalpus genus. Even after grouping it with the Papilioninae, a phylogenetic reconstruction showed that it was Meandrusa was still not an exact match with the other tribes of this family either. Even though they are a part of the Papilioninae subfamily, they are considered a more isolated branch. Recently, genomic studies that involve large mitochondrial databases have given researchers a clearer picture on previous questions about swallowtails. Giving them more information and better general area of where Meandrusa fits in to the tribes. New taxonomic treatments have opened up new species of Meandrusa, helping clarify that same species along with other species. Species like Meandrusa payeni, which have many different types of itself, have become easier to list.

== Description ==
Meandrusa is recognized by their colors and unique wing shapes. Their colors range from gold/yellow to brown/tan, with some darker shading towards the border of their wings. Their wings are long recognizable because they are long and narrow at the end, which gives them the appearance of having a tail. These "tails" are long and curved, resembling a hook or a sickle. Species like Meandrusa sciron are known for having longer and more hooked tails than the others, while Meandrusa payeni are easily recognizable because of their yellow and shaded colors.

== Distribution and habitat ==
Meandrusa can be found mostly in South and Southeast Asia. They are usually found in forests or mountains that have a large amount of vegetation. Meandrusa are not typically seen much due to their habitat being isolated from humans. They thrive off the vegetation and their colors blend in with their environment. Multiple countries are home to Meandrusa. Vietnam, Thailand, Myanmar, Indonesia, China, Nepal, and more parts of the Himalayas are all places where different species of Meandrusa are found. Multiple studies have shown that Meandrusa are found in low numbers, which could mean they are harder to find due to their habitat being thick vegetation. Meandrusa depend on a stable ecosystem to survive. They need forests with enough cover and food and struggle to survive if the factors are not stable as they are sensitive to changes in the environment. Usually middle to higher elevation is where they seem to thrive.

== Biology and ecology ==
The biology of Meandrusa payeni has been studied the most out of the 4 species. Firstly during the larval stage, they are known to feed on trees that are in the family Lauraceae. As adults, they seem to feed off nectar from plants. Meandrusa are usually more active during a specific part of the day, making it harder to come across them. They are also sometimes found at way higher altitudes than other swallowtails, which is another reason that it has been hard in the past to assign them to a tribe or family.

== Conservation ==
Meandrusa is relatively rare. Even though they have not been evaluated very much by bigger conservation organizations, many studies have shown that slight differences in the ecosystem can really affect them. Because they are so reliant on the environment, things like landscaping and cutting down trees in the forest have a large effect on them and threatens their survival. There have been studies that link the connection of a healthy forest with the Meandrusa thriving.
