= Protesilaus glaucolaus =

- P. glaucolaus and related species in Adalbert Seitz's Fauna Americana

Scientific classification
- Kingdom: Animalia
- Phylum: Arthropoda
- Clade: Pancrustacea
- Class: Insecta
- Order: Lepidoptera
- Family: Papilionidae
- Genus: Protesilaus
- Species: P. glaucolaus

Binomial name
- Protesilaus glaucolaus (Bates, 1864)

Synonyms
- Papilio glaucolaus Bates, 1864; Papilio glaucolaus melaenus Rothschild & Jordan, 1906; Papilio glaucolaus leucas Rothschild & Jordan, 1906

Species of butterfly

Protesilaus glaucolaus is a species of butterfly found in the Neotropical realm

== Subspecies ==
- P. g. glaucolaus Costa Rica - Venezuela, Panama
- P. g. melaenus (Rothschild & Jordan, 1906) Colombia
- P. g. leucas (Rothschild & Jordan, 1906) Venezuela, Peru, Brazil

== Description ==
In order to differentiate this and the following species [molops] with certainty, it is necessary to compare specimens from the same districts, and at times to take the sexual organs into consideration. In glaucolaus the black postdiscal band of the forewing is widely separated from the lower angle of the cell, or the teeth of the hindwing are very obtuse and the posterior submarginal spots suffused with brown. Scent-scales of the male as long as in protesilaus - the harpe has at the dorsal edge a very long tooth and the central and ventral processes are short, the latter not reaching to the ventral edge of the clasper. From Panama to Guiana, Upper Amazon, southwards to Matto Grosso, not yet known to us from south-east Peru, Bolivia, Paraguay, Brazil proper and the lower Amazon. A common species.

glaucolaus Bates Greenish, bands 1 and 2 of the forewing not extended beyond the 2. submedian vein, the 6. band 2 to 3 mm. distant from the lower angle of the cell, not narrowed before the 2. radial, the transparent submarginal band at least twice as broad at the .5. subcostal as the black marginal band. Panama; Colombia, with the exception of the province of Gauca, perhaps also in North Venezuela.

melaenus R.& J. The black bands broader than in the preceding form [glaucolaus], the transparent submarginal interspace of the forewing usually- only little or not at all broader at the 5. subcostal than the marginal band, in some specimens, however, much broader, in which case the interspace between bands 5 and 6 is narrowed correspondingly. West Colombia and upper Gauca Valley.

leucas R.& J. Wings only distinctly green towards the base; postdiscal band of the forewing narrowed near the lower angle of the cell and usually before the 2. radial. Hindwing more obtusely dentate than in protesilaus, the submarginal spots tinged with brown, 2. band of the forewing from the cell backwards narrower above than beneath, the side of the frons white. The harpe of leucas more obtuse than in glaucolaus, the dorsal tooth narrower and the central process longer. Orinoco, Guiana, the Amazons, East Ecuador, East Peru and Matto Grosso; common.

Sometimes difficult to separate from Protesilaus molops.

== Status ==
Common, no known threats.
