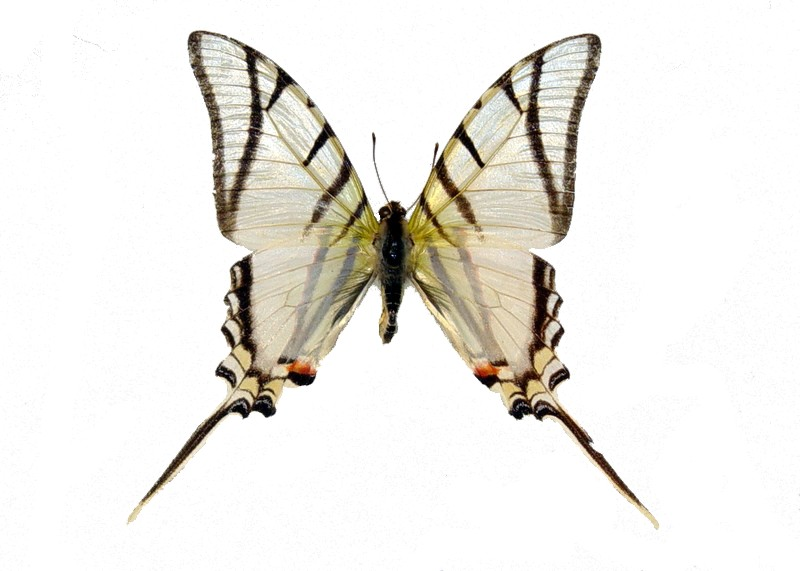

Scientific classification
- Kingdom: Animalia
- Phylum: Arthropoda
- Class: Insecta
- Order: Lepidoptera
- Family: Papilionidae
- Genus: Protesilaus
- Species: P. telesilaus

Binomial name
- Protesilaus telesilaus (C. & R. Felder, 1864)

Synonyms
- Papilio telesilaus C. & R. Felder, 1864; Papilio protesilaus domitor Fruhstorfer, 1907; Papilio protesilaus var. macrosilaus Bates, 1863; Papilio telesilaus domitor f. vitellus Fruhstorfer, 1907

= Protesilaus telesilaus =

Species of butterfly

Protesilaus telesilaus is a species of butterfly of the genus Protesilaus. It is native to the Americas.

== Subspecies ==
- P. t. telesilaus (Colombia, Venezuela, Brazil: Amazonas, Espírito Santo, Rio de Janeiro)
- P. t. dolius (Rothschild & Jordan, 1906) (Panama, Colombia)
- P. t. salobrensis (d'Almeida, 1941) (Brazil: Mato Grosso)
- P. t. vitellus Fruhstorfer, 1907 (Brazil: Paraná, Santa Catarina)
