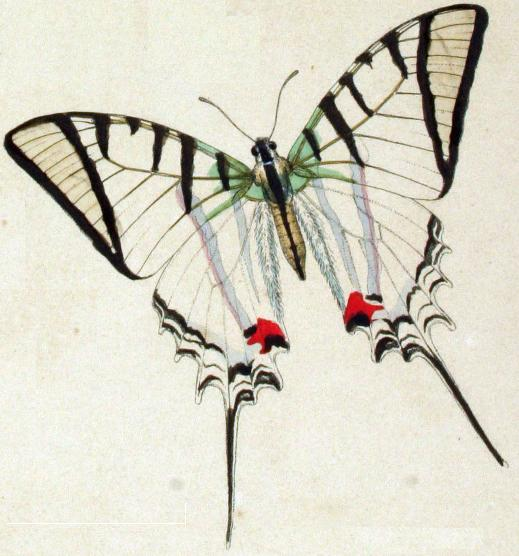
- Protesilaus macrosilaus penthesilaus

Scientific classification
- Kingdom: Animalia
- Phylum: Arthropoda
- Class: Insecta
- Order: Lepidoptera
- Family: Papilionidae
- Genus: Protesilaus
- Species: P. macrosilaus

Binomial name
- Protesilaus macrosilaus (Gray, [1853])

Synonyms
- Papilio protesilaus var. macrosilaus Gray, [1853]; Papilio duodecimus Röber, 1927; Papilio protesilaus leucones Rothschild & Jordan, 1906; Papilio penthesilaus C. & R. Felder, 1865; Papilio penthesilaus C. & R. Felder, 1864; Protesilaus marcosilaus

= Protesilaus macrosilaus =

Species of butterfly

Protesilaus macrosilaus is a species of butterfly of the genus Protesilaus. It is found in Mexico and from Guatemala to Nicaragua and in Colombia.

== Subspecies ==
- Protesilaus macrosilaus macrosilaus (Guatemala to Nicaragua)
- Protesilaus macrosilaus leucones (Rothschild & Jordan, 1906) (Colombia)
- Protesilaus macrosilaus penthesilaus (C. & R. Felder, 1865) (Mexico)
