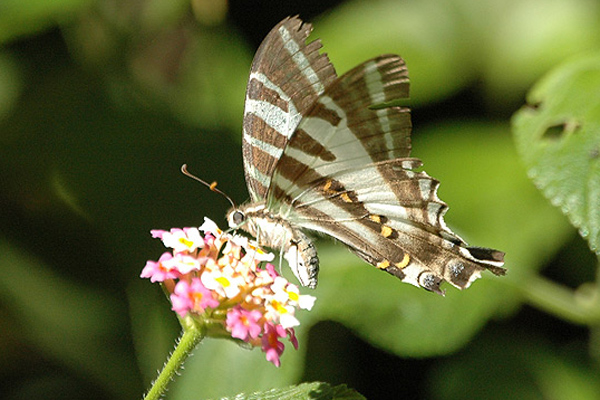

Scientific classification
- Kingdom: Animalia
- Phylum: Arthropoda
- Clade: Pancrustacea
- Class: Insecta
- Order: Lepidoptera
- Family: Papilionidae
- Genus: Protographium
- Species: P. leosthenes

Binomial name
- Protographium leosthenes Doubleday, 1846
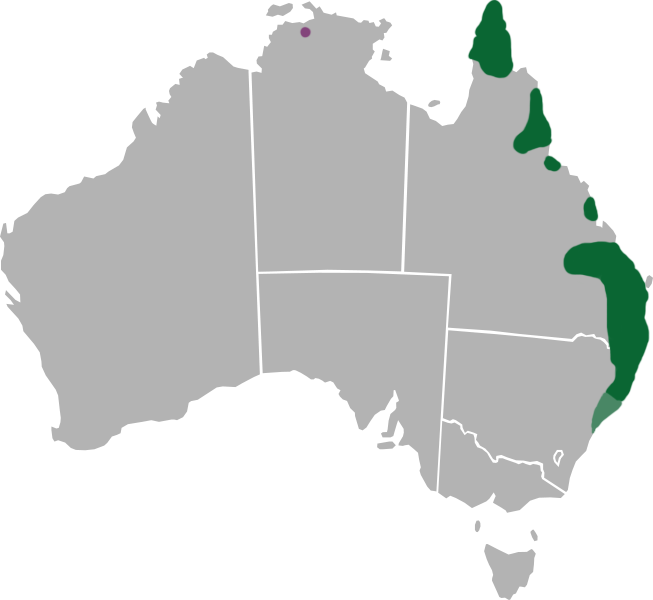
- Range of four-barred swordtail P. l. leosthenes; P. l. geimbia

Synonyms
- Papilio leosthenes Doubleday, 1846

= Protographium leosthenes =

Species of butterfly

Protographium leosthenes, the four-barred swordtail, is a medium-sized butterfly of the family Papilionidae found in Australia. It is similar to the five-barred (or chain) swordtail (Graphium aristeus) found in both Australia and India.

== Appearance ==
Adults are brown and white, with four brown parallel bars running down the leading edge of the forewing. The hindwings have a pointed tail. Their wingspan is approximately 49 mm for males and 53 mm for females. The four-barred swordtail can be distinguished from the five-barred swordtail by the number of bars, and pale orange and blue spots on the upperside of the hindwing. In addition, the four-barred swordtail has pale orange markings on the underside of its hindwing, rather than red markings.

== Biology ==
The eggs are cream coloured and laid singly on young leaves of the larval plant. The larvae feed on Melodorum leichhardtii, Melodorum rupestre, Polyalthia nitidissima and occasionally Desmos wardianus. Early instars are pale green, with black spots and a black thorax and tail. The caterpillar later becomes green with brown or yellow spots, and reaches a length of up to 3.5 centimetres. The pupa is about 2 centimetres in length, and green with pink markings. There is usually one generation per year, with adult emergence varying with the season.

The preferred habitat is monsoon forest and subtropical rainforest, where the larval plants are found. Adults fly near the ground (within about 2 metres) with their wings spread. The males frequently hilltop.

== Subspecies ==
- P. l. leosthenes (south-eastern coast of New South Wales and the Murray-Darling basin, northern Gulf and north-eastern coast of Queensland)
- P. l. geimbia (Tindale, 1927) (northern coast of the Northern Territory)
