= Meandrusa gyas =

Scientific classification
- Kingdom: Animalia
- Phylum: Arthropoda
- Class: Insecta
- Order: Lepidoptera
- Family: Papilionidae
- Genus: Meandrusa
- Species: M. gyas

Binomial name
- Meandrusa gyas (Westwood, 1841)

Synonyms
- Papilio gyas Westwood, 1841

Species of butterfly

Meandrusa gyas, the brown gorgon, is a species of butterfly in the family Papilionidae. It is found from Sikkim to Assam and Upper Burma, as well as in Thailand.

== Subspecies ==
- Meandrusa gyas gyas
- Meandrusa gyas sukkiti Nakano, 1995 (Thailand)
