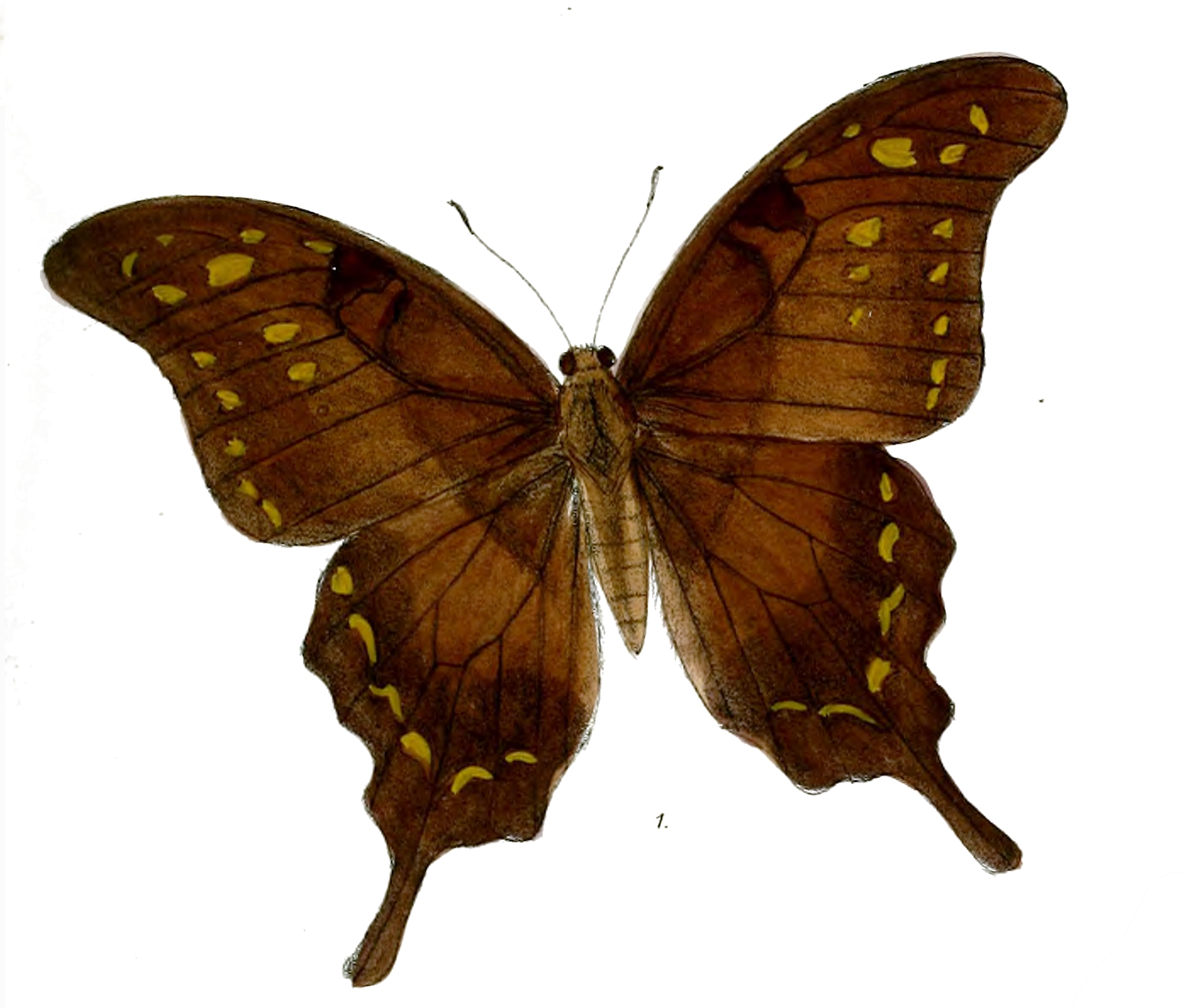
- Male
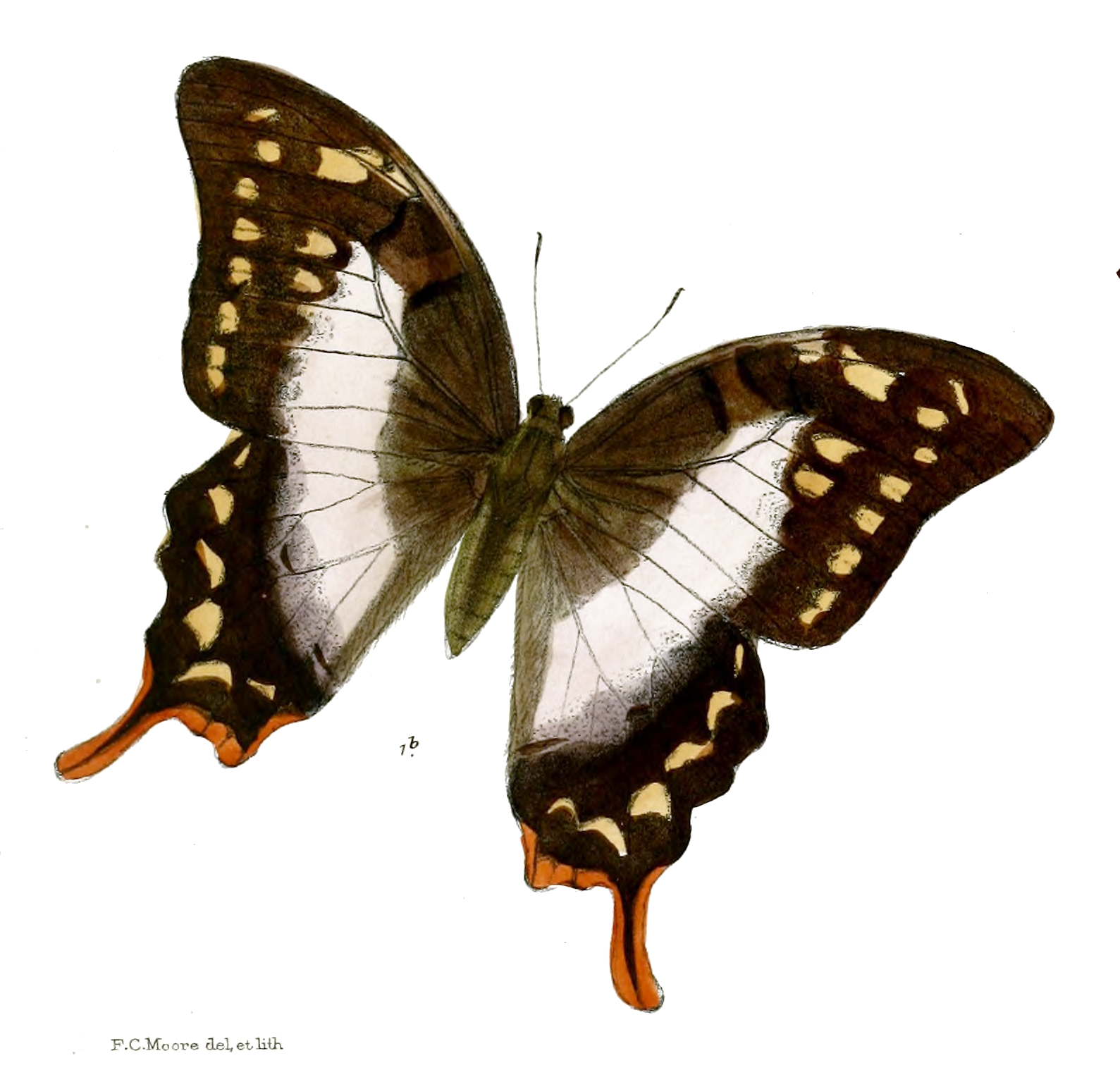
- Female

Scientific classification
- Kingdom: Animalia
- Phylum: Arthropoda
- Class: Insecta
- Order: Lepidoptera
- Family: Papilionidae
- Genus: Meandrusa
- Species: M. sciron

Binomial name
- Meandrusa sciron (Leech, 1890)

Synonyms
- Papilio sciron Leech, 1890; Papilio lachinus Fruhstorfer, 1902; Papilio gyas aribbas Fruhstorfer, 1909; Papilio hercules Blanchard, 1871; Papilio porus Strecker, 1900

= Meandrusa sciron =

Brown gorgon

Species of butterfly

Meandrusa sciron, the brown gorgon, is a species of swallowtail butterfly found in parts of South Asia and Southeast Asia. It belongs to the hooked swallowtails genus, Meandrusa, of the family Papilionidae. The brown gorgon is found in India from Sikkim to Assam and north Burma and is not considered to be threatened. Though not uncommon, it is protected under Indian law under the name gyas.

== Description ==
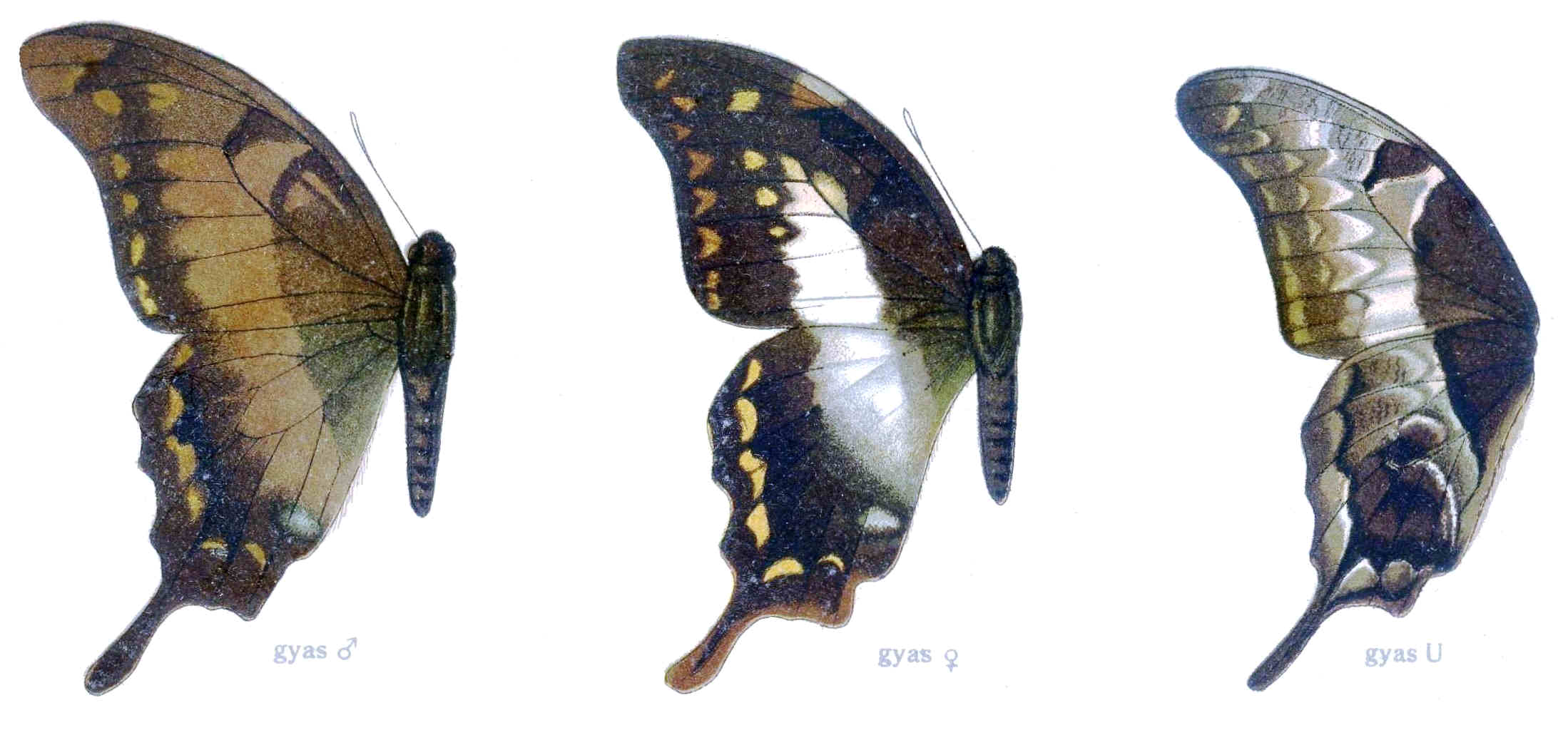
Male upperside, female upperside, underside

=== Male ===
Upperside opaque brown, the basal area and the terminal third of both forewings and hindwings of a darker shade than the broad medial area, due to the dark markings of the underside that show through by transparency; forewings and hindwings with a subterminal series of largish yellow lunules that curve upwards posteriorly on the hindwing and end in a diffuse transverse bluish-white mark across interspace 1. Underside, forewing: basal third and a large spot on the discocellulars, that is widened anteriorly, rich dark cinnamon-brown; medial third lilacine, pale towards the dorsum, widened anteriorly and extended into the apex of the cell, and on the costa from the discocellulars to near the apex of the wing; interspaces 2, 3 and 4 with paler lilacine (lilac-coloured) lunules; terminal third of the wing dull brown, with a postdiscal and a subterminal transverse series of somewhat obscure olivaceous-yellow lunules. Hindwing: basal third rich dark cinnamon brown in continuation of that colour on the forewing; remainder of the wing lilacine, with a large posterior discal patch of cinnamon brown, margined inwardly by a diffuse broad irregular white band, and outwardly by a series of white lunules; a subterminal somewhat obscure row of olivaceous-yellow markings; the tail and terminal margin dark cinnamon brown. Antennae dark brown, head, thorax and abdomen brown with an olivaceous tinge; beneath: similar, the abdomen more brightly olivaceous yellow.

=== Female ===
Upperside: ground colour similar to that in the male; marking differ as follows: a very broad discal transverse lilacine white band across both forewings and hindwings that extends from vein 5 and from within the apex of cell of forewing to the dorsal margin of the hindwing. Forewing: a yellowish-white costal spot in upper third of cell, a larger spot beyond that turns to yellow at base of interspace 6, an anterior postdiscal transverse series of yellow more or less lunular spots, and a subterminal similar series of spots. Hindwing: the lilacine white colour of the discal band spreads to the base of the wing, but is thickly irrorated (sprinkled) with brownish scales, as is also the outer margin posteriorly of the same band; the rest of the wing dark brown, with the margins of the tornus and of the tail broadly bright cinnamon brown; lastly, superposed on the brown area is a sub-terminal series of large, yellow, well-defined more or less lunular spots. Underside similar to that of the male, the ground colour and markings on the outer two-thirds of both forewing and hindwing paler. Antennae, head, thorax and abdomen as in the male. Karl Jordan in Seitz (page 91) provides a description differentiating gyas from nearby taxa and discussing some forms.

== Subspecies ==
- Meandrusa sciron sciron
- Meandrusa sciron abaensis Sugiyama, 1994 (China: Sichuan)
- Meandrusa sciron aribbas (Fruhstorfer, 1909) (western China, Myanmar)
- Meandrusa sciron dalata Monastyrskii & Devyatkin, 2003 (Vietnam)
- Meandrusa lachinus Fruhstorfer, 1902 (India:Senchal, Darjeeling)
- Meandrusa sciron nagamasai Okano, 1986 (Thailand)

== Other references ==
- Collins, N. Mark; Morris, Michael G. (1985). Threatened Swallowtail Butterflies of the World: The IUCN Red Data Book. Gland & Cambridge: IUCN. ISBN 978-2-88032-603-6 – via Biodiversity Heritage Library.
- Wynter-Blyth, Mark Alexander (1957). Butterflies of the Indian Region. Bombay, India: Bombay Natural History Society. ISBN 978-8170192329.
