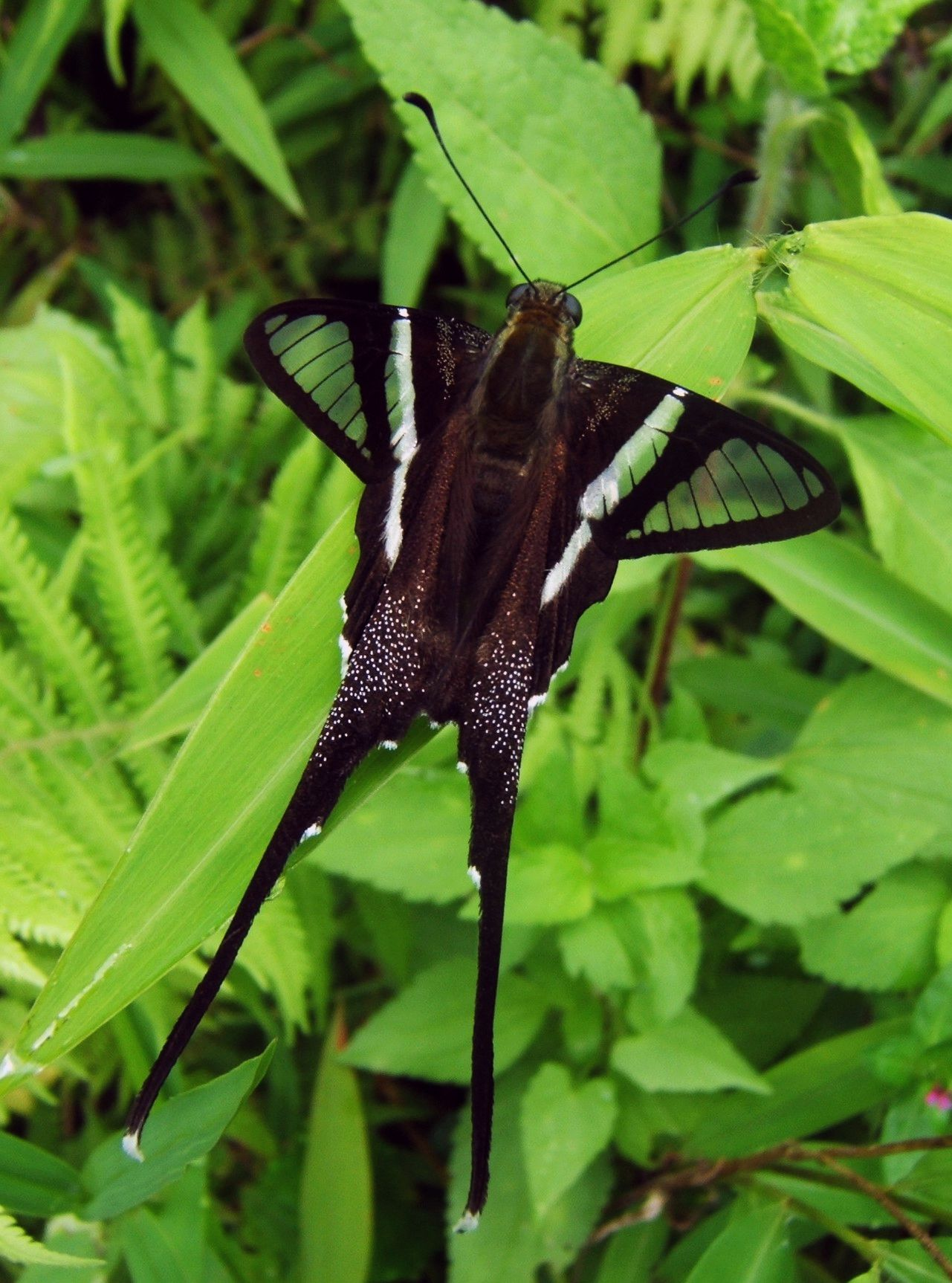

Scientific classification
- Kingdom: Animalia
- Phylum: Arthropoda
- Class: Insecta
- Order: Lepidoptera
- Family: Papilionidae
- Genus: Lamproptera
- Species: L. curius

Binomial name
- Lamproptera curius (Fabricius, 1787)

Synonyms
- Leptocircus curius

= Lamproptera curius =

White dragontail

Species of butterfly

Lamproptera curius, the white dragontail, is a species of swallowtail butterfly native to parts of South Asia and Southeast Asia where it is common. It belongs to the dragontails genus, Lamproptera, of the swallowtail family, Papilionidae.

== Description ==
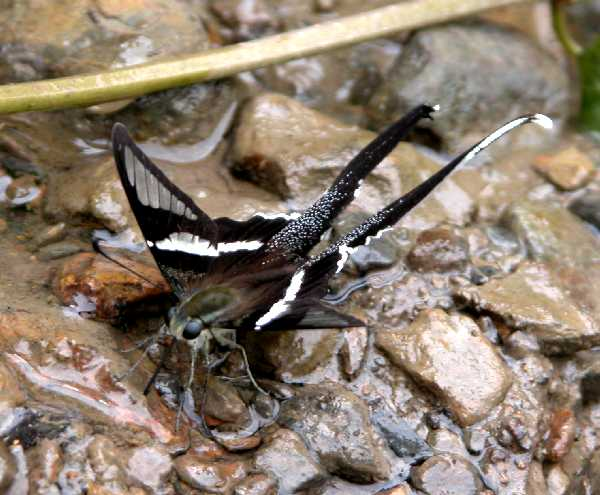
Mud-puddling

Upperside dull brownish black. Forewing: a broad outwardly oblique white transverse band that crosses from a little beyond the basal third of the costal margin to the dorsum, its outer half hyaline (glass like), followed by a hyaline triangular area that does not reach the costa or the termen but is traversed by conspicuously black veins. Between the semihyaline transverse band and the hyaline area the black forms a more or less even band slightly narrower in the middle; the black edging to the costa and termen broad, broadened towards the apex; cilia black.

Hindwing: the transverse white band of the forewing is continued straight across and ends in a point on the outer half of vein 3, but is not hyaline along its outer margin; posterior half of the wing dull dark brown, irrorated (sprinkled) towards the base of the long narrow tail at vein 4 with white scales; cilia black, white below vein 5 and along outer side of basal half of tail, the latter tipped white.

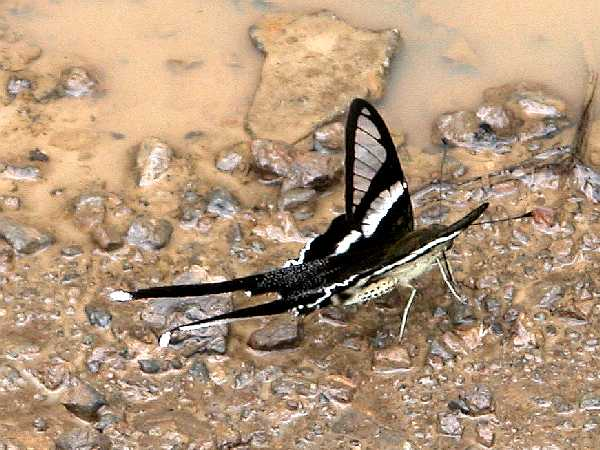
Dragontail mud-puddling

Underside similar, but the ground colour opaque brownish black; a broad outwardly ill-defined earthy-grey streak along the base of the wings produced slightly down the dorsal margin of hindwing and along the costa of the forewing; the oblique white band on the hindwing joined by a cross sinuous short white line from the dorsal margin to its apex; below this latter a number of irregular white spots on the tornal area. Antennae, head and thorax black, abdomen dark brownish black; beneath, the palpi, thorax and abdomen greyish; claws of the tarsi bifid. Male with a sex mark or brand.

== Distribution ==
This butterfly is found in India from Assam to Burma. It is also found in Thailand, Laos, Vietnam, southern China, Kampuchea, Malaysia, Indonesia, Brunei, and the Philippines.

== Status ==
The white dragontail is not known to be threatened in most of its range but is considered vulnerable and in need of protection in Peninsular Malaysia.

== Life history ==
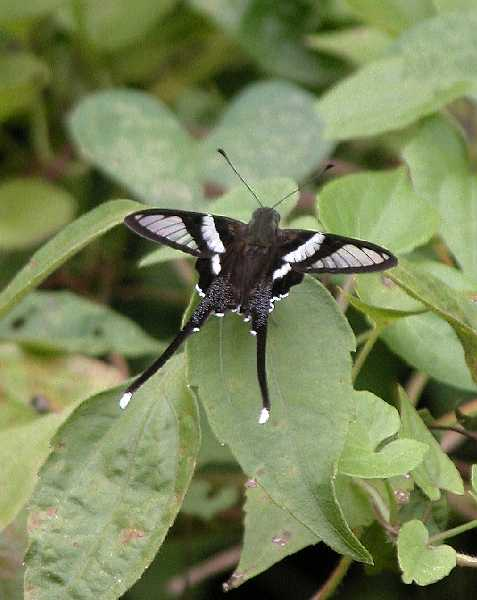

The life cycle of the butterfly takes about six weeks.

=== Food plants ===
Illigera celebica and Illigera platyandra (family Hernandiaceae).

=== Larva ===
In the early stages the larva is black over the thorax narrow above the prolegs, and broadening again at the tail end. The larva is smooth. The sides above the prolegs are yellow ochre. A narrow border around the head and the anal segment yellow ochre. Initially the head is black. The larva in later instars becomes apple green, darker on the back, with three narrow yellow stripes on the seventh to tenth segments, and a buff line just above the legs from head to tail. The head is green with four round black spots on the crown, and two more smaller ones at the angle of the jaws.

=== Pupa ===
Under artificial rearing the pupation took place on the underside of the leaf. The pupa is attached by a white pad at the cremaster, and has a fine girdle. It is only 22 mm long and the colour varies from yellow green on young growth, to emerald on mature leaves.
