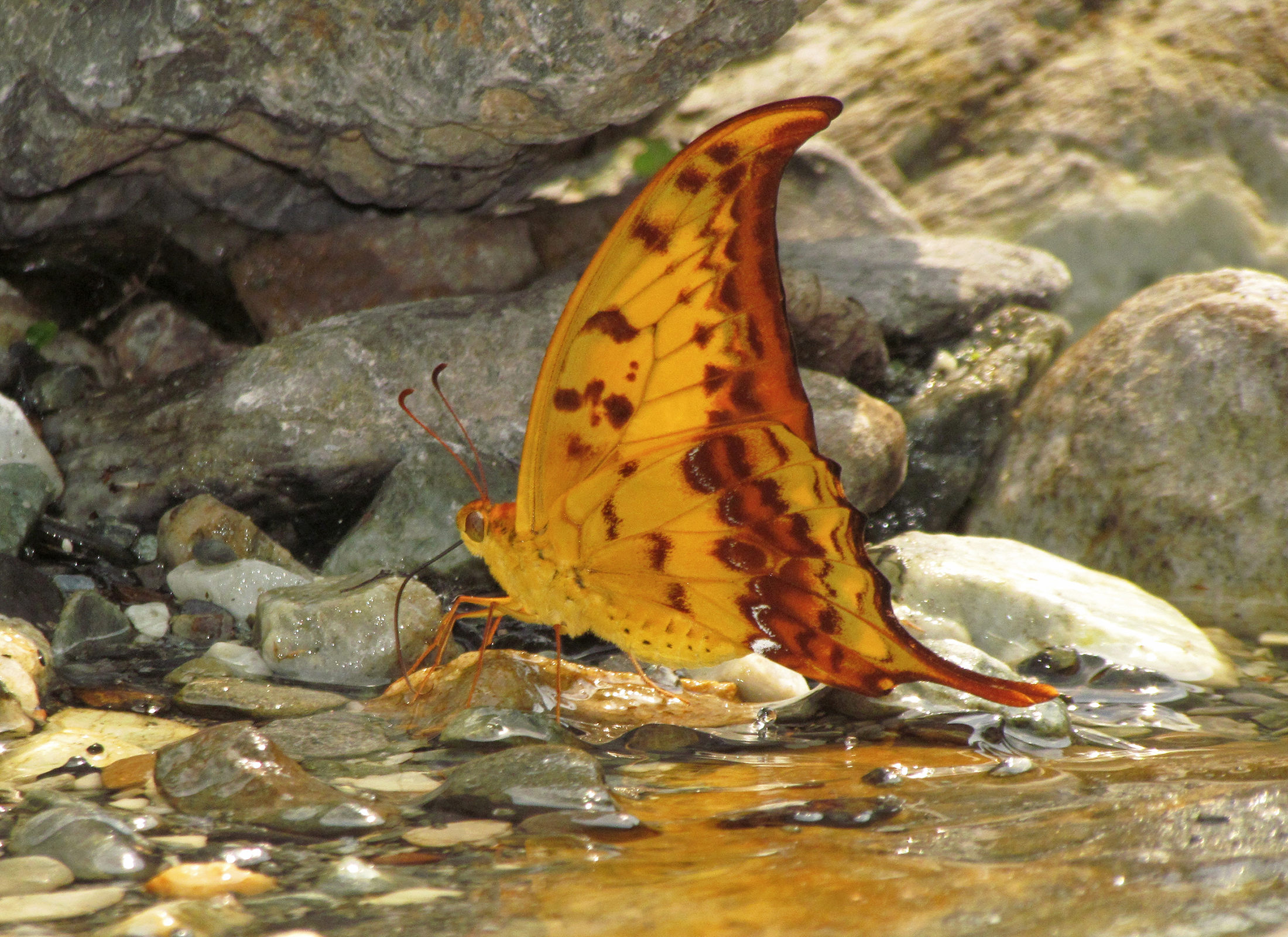
- M. p. evan individual in Sikkim
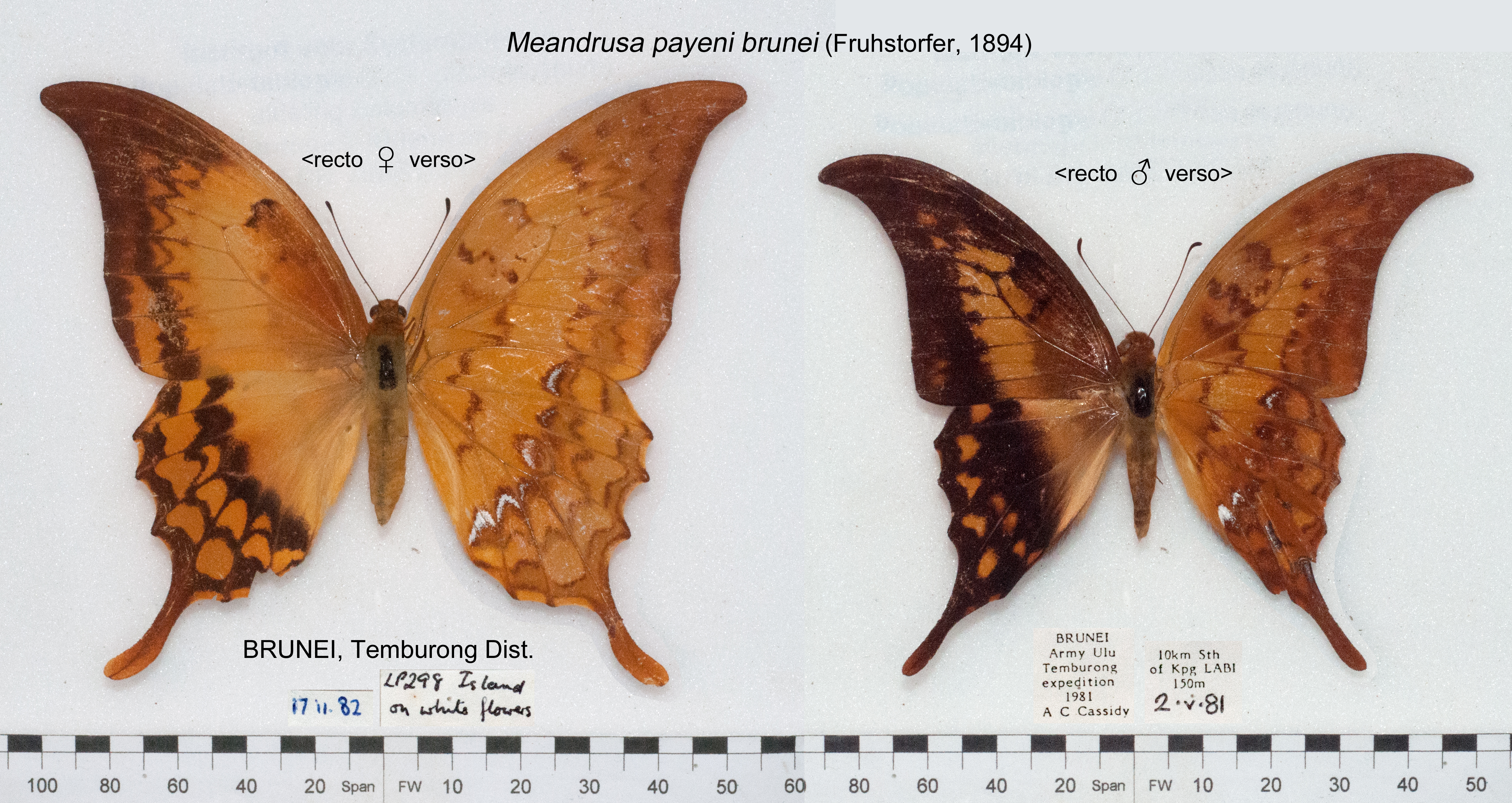
- Meandrusa payeni brunei (Fruhstorfer, 1894)

Scientific classification
- Kingdom: Animalia
- Phylum: Arthropoda
- Clade: Pancrustacea
- Class: Insecta
- Order: Lepidoptera
- Family: Papilionidae
- Genus: Meandrusa
- Species: M. payeni

Binomial name
- Meandrusa payeni (Boisduval, 1836)

Synonyms
- Papilio payeni Boisduval, 1836; Papilio evan Doubleday, 1845; Papilio evan evanides Fruhstorfer, 1902; Papilio evan evanides Fruhstorfer, 1903; Papilio brunei Fruhstorfer, 1894; Papilio payeni langsonensis Fruhstorfer, 1901; Papilio payeni ciminius Fruhstorfer, 1909; Papilio amphis Jordan, 1909; Papilio payeni hegylus Jordan, 1909

= Meandrusa payeni =

Yellow gorgon

Species of butterfly

Meandrusa payeni, the yellow gorgon, is a species of swallowtail found in parts of South Asia and Southeast Asia. It belongs to the hooked swallowtails genus, Meandrusa, of the family Papilionidae. It is also called the outlet sword or the sickle.

== Description ==
=== Male ===
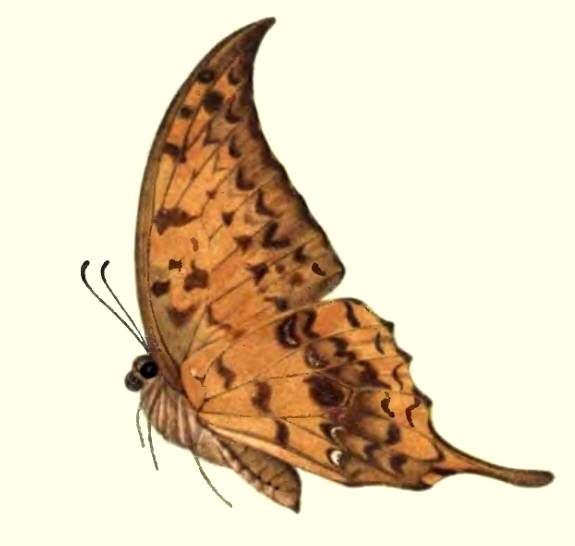

Upperside bright ochraceous, with a darker shade towards the base of the wings. Forewing: two or three spots obliquely across the cell, a larger spot at its upper apex, the costal margin from base (the collar broadened towards the apex), and the terminal margin very broadly, dark brown; on the inner side of this broad brown terminal edging there is a transverse incomplete discal series of dark brown spots, followed by an irregular transverse series of brown lunules, both these merge anteriorly and posteriorly into the brown on the termen; lastly superposed on the brown terminal edging is a more or less complete, transverse, subterminal series of lunules of the ochraceous ground colour, reduced in some specimens to only two or three lunules above the tornus. Hindwing: terminal half or more dark brown, with an inner postdiscal and an outer subterminal series of more or less lunular spots of the ochraceous ground colour; the postdiscal series consists of only four spots in interspaces 1 to 4, the subterminal series is complete to interspace 7, the spots larger, that in inter-apace 3 elongate, outwardly conical; tail tipped with ochraceous. underside: ground colour a deeper richer ochraceous. Forewing: cell and basal area with a number of irregular cinnamon-brown spots, followed on the terminal half by three transverse series of more or less irregular and incomplete lunular cinnamon-brown markings and a narrow brown terminal edging. Hindwing: basal area with a transverse series of three spots, a large spot at apex of cell, the bases of interspaces 1, 2 and 3, followed by three more or less complete but irregular series of lunular markings, cinnamon brown; superposed on the inner discal row of brown lunules is a transverse series of snow-white crescents, conspicuous only in interspaces 1 and 2, but barely indicated anteriorly. Antenna dark ochraceous brown; head, thorax and abdomen ochraceous, the thorax posteriorly and basal half of the abdomen olivaceous; beneath: head, thorax and abdomen brighter ochraceous.

=== Female ===
Ground colour paler, base and cell of forewing on upperside shaded with bright very pale cinnamon; markings similar both on the upper and under sides, but less clearly defined; the costal margin of forewing on the upperside ochraceous almost to apex, not brown; the subterminal series of ochraceous lunules on the upperside of the hindwing very large, separated from one another only by the brown along the veins. Antennae, head, thorax and abdomen similar, but paler.

Karl Jordan in Seitz (page 91, 92) provides a description differentiating payeni from nearby taxa and discussing some forms.

== Subspecies ==
- Meandrusa payeni payeni (Java)
- Meandrusa payeni brunei (Fruhstorfer, 1894) (northern Borneo)
- Meandrusa payeni ciminius (Fruhstorfer, 1909) (Burma to Peninsular Malaya, Sumatra)
- Meandrusa payeni evan (Doubleday, 1845) (Bhutan, India: Sikkim, Assam)
- Meandrusa payeni hegylus (Jordan, 1909) (China: Hainan)
- Meandrusa payeni langsonensis (Fruhstorfer, 1901) (northern Vietnam)

== Distribution ==
The butterfly is found in India from Sikkim to Assam, north Burma and Peninsular Malaysia.

== Status ==
The yellow gorgon is not threatened, but is not common across most of its range. However it is considered to be vulnerable and in need of protection in Peninsular Malaysia.
