= List of butterflies of Georgia (country) =

Georgia is a nation in the Caucasus region of Eurasia. Its varied climate and geography make it home to a diverse range of butterfly species, some of which are endemic to the region.

== Geographical distribution ==
Georgia's unique location, spanning both Europe and Asia, contributes to its rich biodiversity. The country's varied ecosystems, from the subtropical Black Sea coast to the alpine regions of the Greater Caucasus, offer habitats for numerous butterfly species.

== Conservation status ==
Many of Georgia's butterfly species are of significant conservation concern due to habitat loss, climate change, and other environmental pressures. Efforts to conserve these species are ongoing, with several areas designated as protected habitats.

== List of butterflies ==
The following is a list of butterfly species recorded in Georgia, organized by family.

=== Papilionidae ===
- Papilio machaon – Old World swallowtail
- Iphiclides podalirius – scarce swallowtail
- Parnassius apollo – Apollo butterfly

=== Pieridae ===
- Pieris brassicae – large white
- Pieris rapae – small white
- Gonepteryx rhamni – common brimstone

=== Nymphalidae ===
- Vanessa atalanta – red admiral
- Inachis io – European peacock
- Aglais urticae – small tortoiseshell

=== Lycaenidae ===
- Polyommatus icarus – common blue
- Lycaena phlaeas – small copper
- Callophrys rubi – green hairstreak

=== Hesperiidae ===
- Ochlodes venata – large skipper
- Thymelicus sylvestris – small skipper

== See also ==
- Fauna of Georgia (country)
