= Catocala kotschubeyi =

Scientific classification
- Kingdom: Animalia
- Phylum: Arthropoda
- Class: Insecta
- Order: Lepidoptera
- Superfamily: Noctuoidea
- Family: Erebidae
- Genus: Catocala
- Species: C. kotschubeyi

Binomial name
- Catocala kotschubeyi Sheljuzhko, 1927

Species of moth

Catocala kotschubeyi is a moth in the family Erebidae first described by Leo Sheljuzhko in 1927. It is found in the Russian Far East (southern Ussuri).
