= Catocala aenigma =

Scientific classification
- Kingdom: Animalia
- Phylum: Arthropoda
- Class: Insecta
- Order: Lepidoptera
- Superfamily: Noctuoidea
- Family: Erebidae
- Genus: Catocala
- Species: C. aenigma

Binomial name
- Catocala aenigma (Sheljuzhko, 1943)

Synonyms
- Ephesia aenigma Sheljuzhko, 1943

Species of moth

Catocala aenigma is a moth in the family Erebidae first described by Leo Sheljuzhko in 1943. It is found in south-eastern Siberia.
