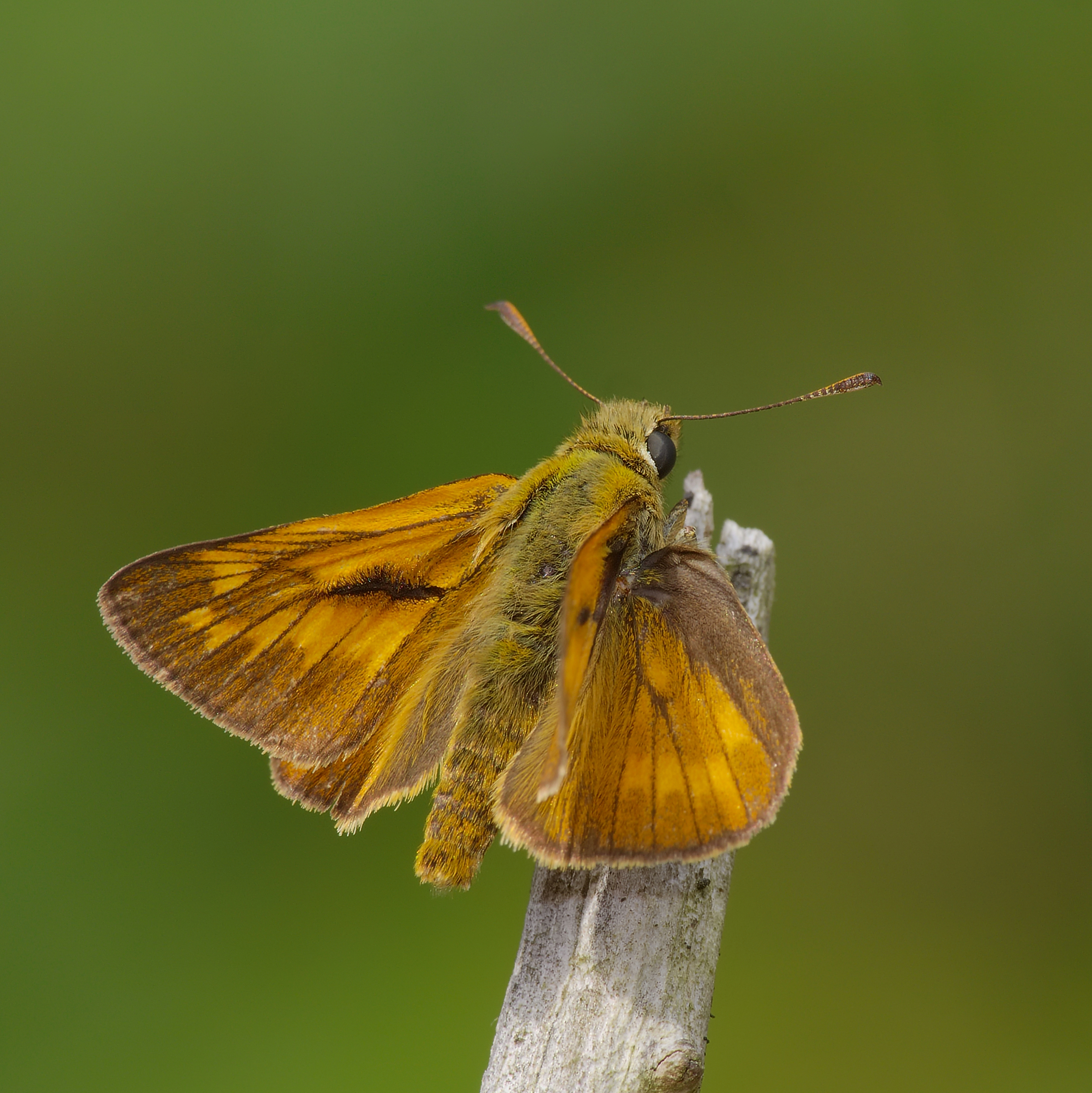
- Male with androconial dark line . Upperside
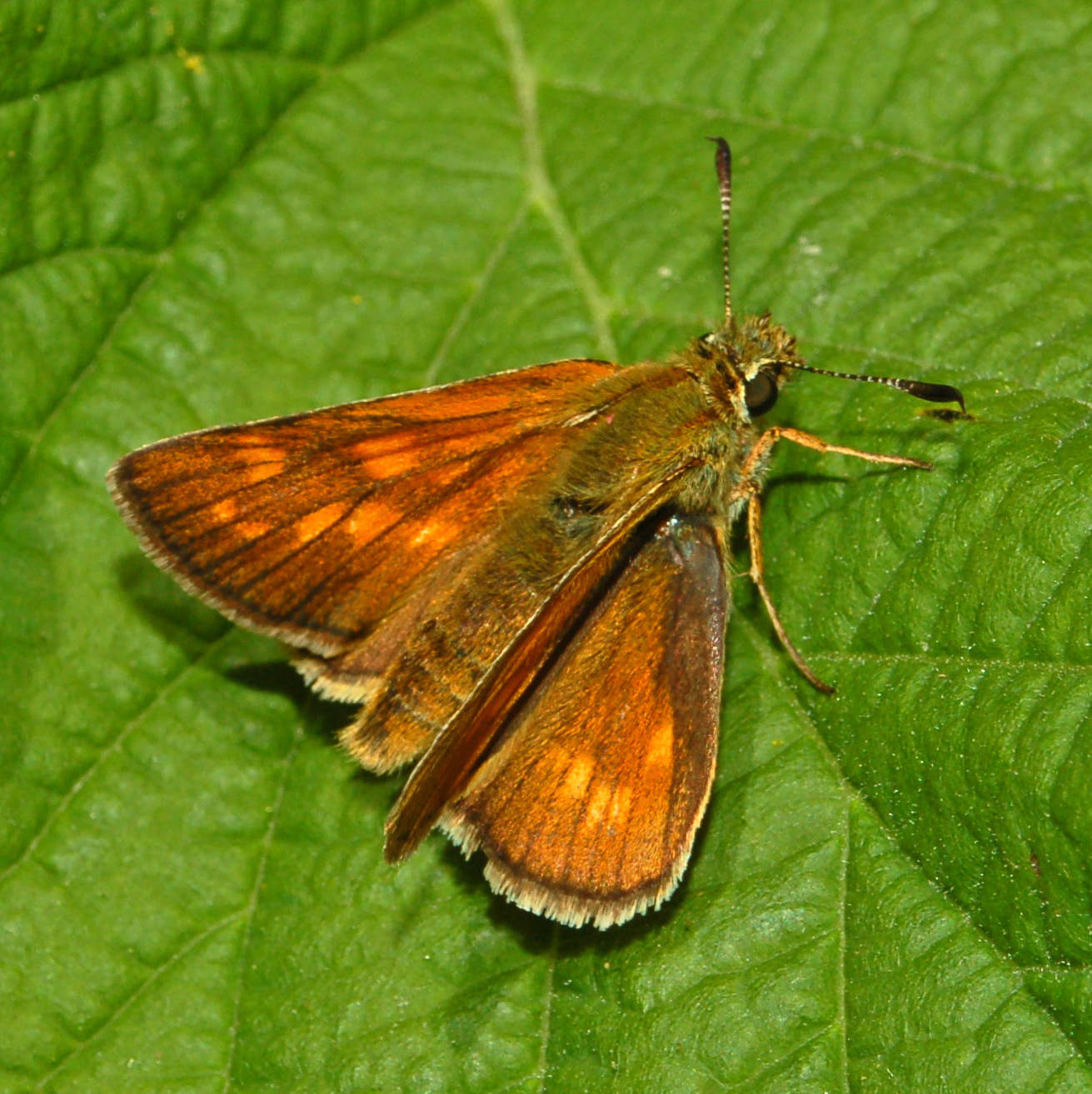
- Female. Upperside

Scientific classification
- Domain: Eukaryota
- Kingdom: Animalia
- Phylum: Arthropoda
- Class: Insecta
- Order: Lepidoptera
- Family: Hesperiidae
- Genus: Ochlodes
- Species: O. sylvanus

Binomial name
- Ochlodes sylvanus (Esper, 1777)
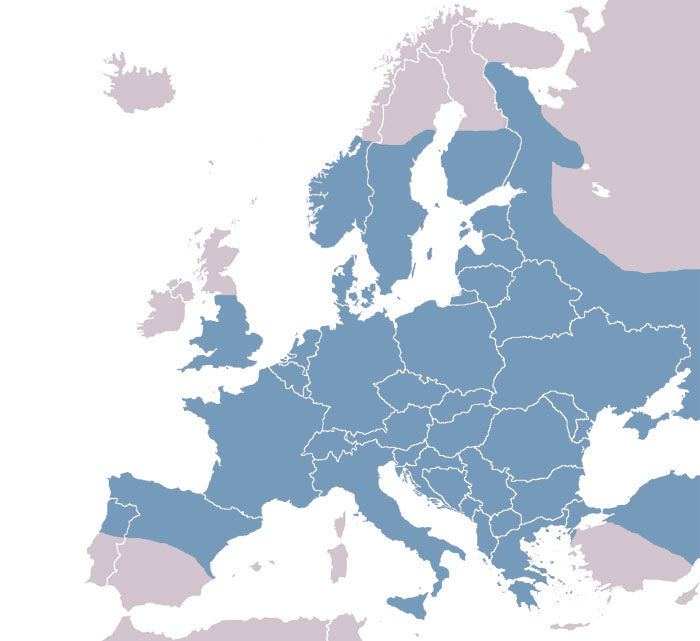
- European part of range

Synonyms
- List: Papilio sylvanus Esper, 1777; Papilio melicerta Bergsträsser, 1780; Augiades venata faunus Turati, 1905; Ochlodes venatus faunus (Turati, 1905); Ochlodes alexandra Hemming, 1934; Ochlodes esperi Verity, 1934

= Large skipper =

Species of butterfly

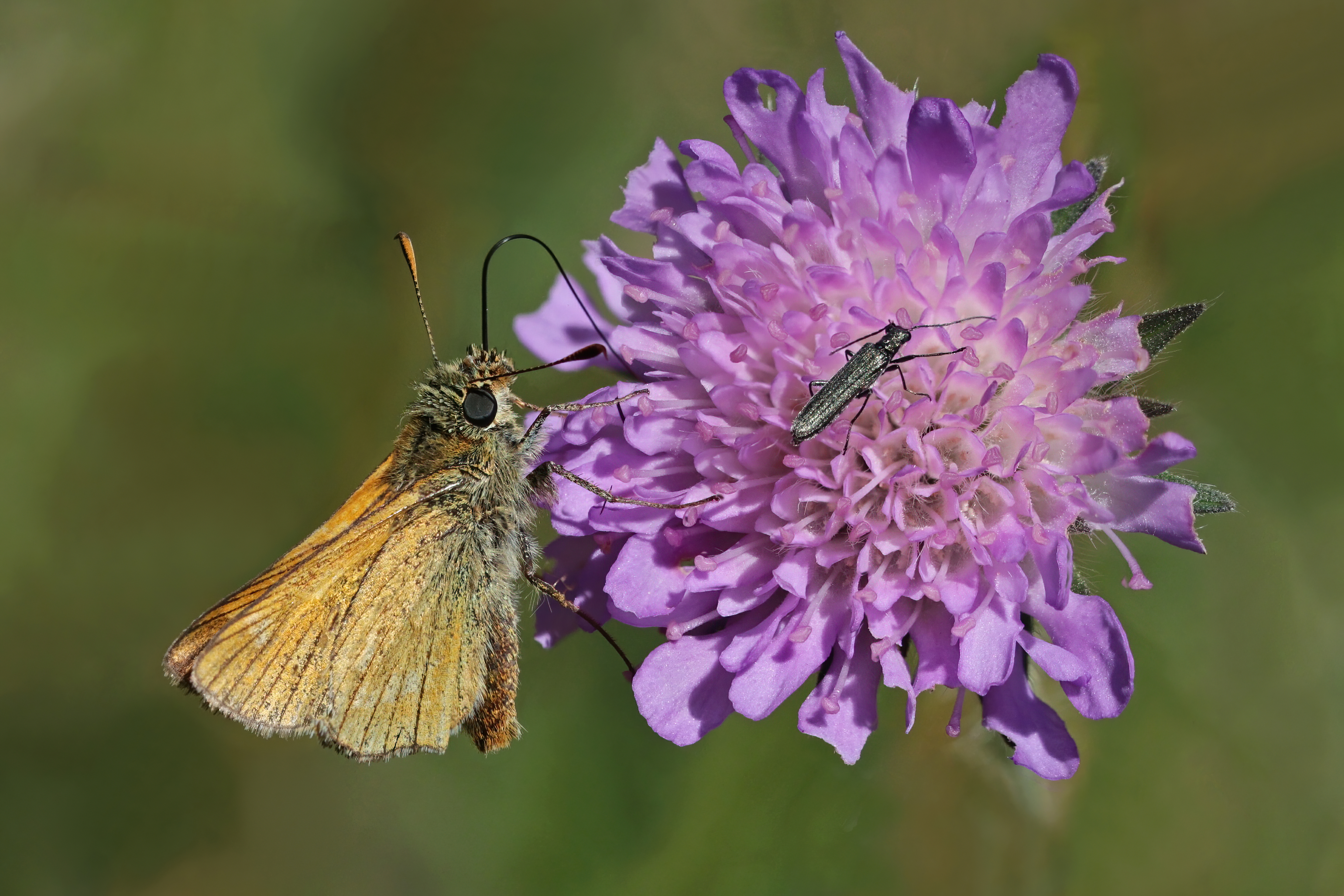
underside

The large skipper (Ochlodes sylvanus) is a butterfly of the family Hesperiidae.

== Taxonomy ==
It was long known as Ochlodes venatus, but this is a Far Eastern relative. There is still some dispute whether this species should be considered a distinct species or included in O. venatus as a subspecies. Under ICZN rules the specific name, originally proposed as Papilio sylvanus, is invalid as a homonym (of the butterfly now called Anthene sylvanus), but it has been conserved by an ICZN commission decision in 2000.

== Distribution and habitat ==
This species occurs from Europe to the East Palearctic realm (northern Asia, China and Japan). In the British Isles it occurs in England, Wales, and south western and southeastern Scotland. It can be found anywhere where wild grasses are allowed to grow tall. Hedgerows, woodland clearings and edges are favourites.

== Description ==
Ochlodes sylvanus has a wingspan of 28–32 mm, which is similar in size to Chequered skipper. Although called "large" this is still a relatively small butterfly and not much larger than either the small or Essex skippers. The body is rather squat. The antennae are hooked at their tips. The upperside of the wings is orange-brown with a brown border and some lighter spots. The underside of the hindwings is greenish-yellow, marked with sparse yellow spots. The male has a broad scented androconial dark line across the top of the forewings. On the hindwings of the females there are brighter square marks. When the wings are opened, the forewings are obliquely folded, masking the hindwings.

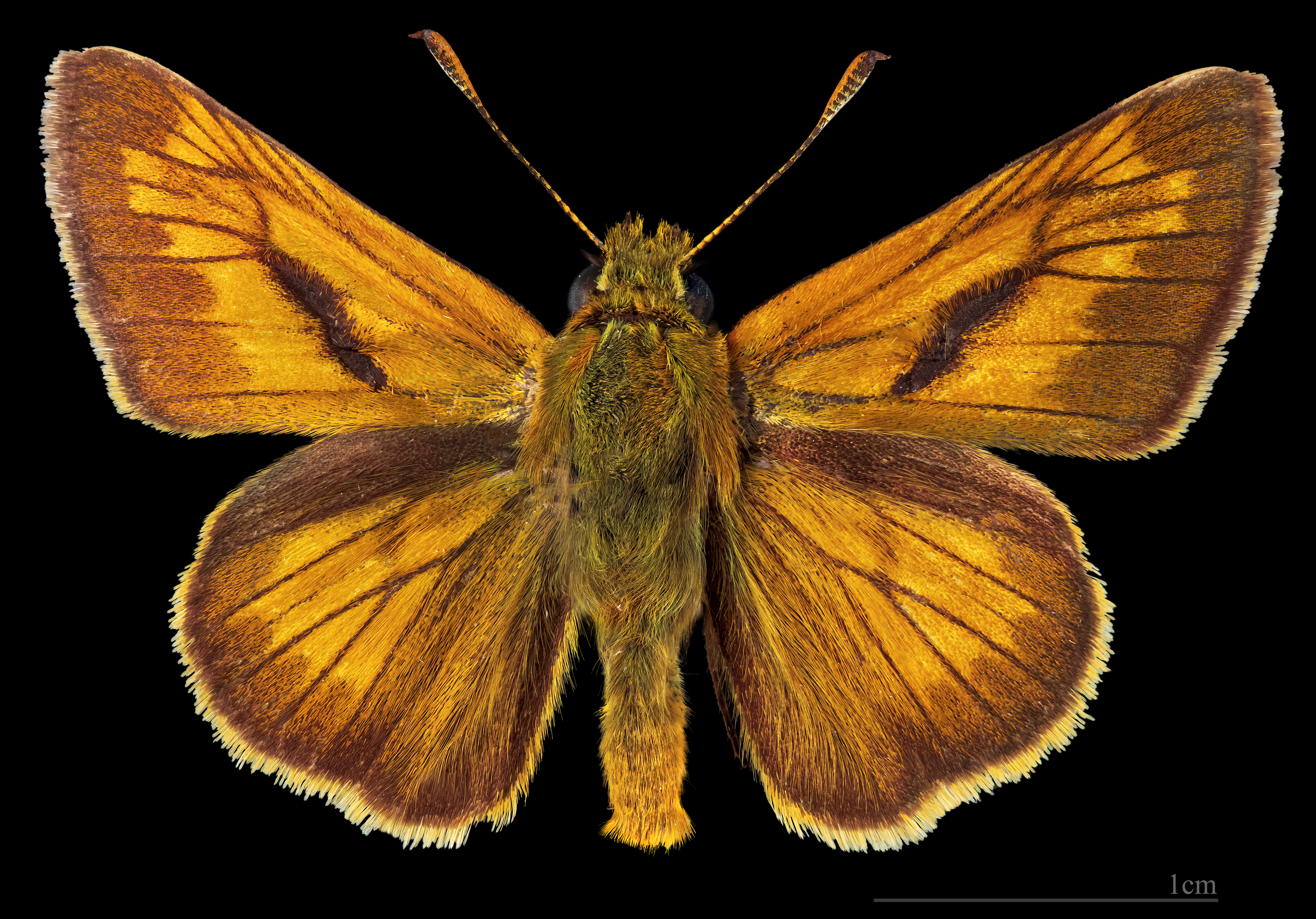
Ochlodes sylvanus ♂

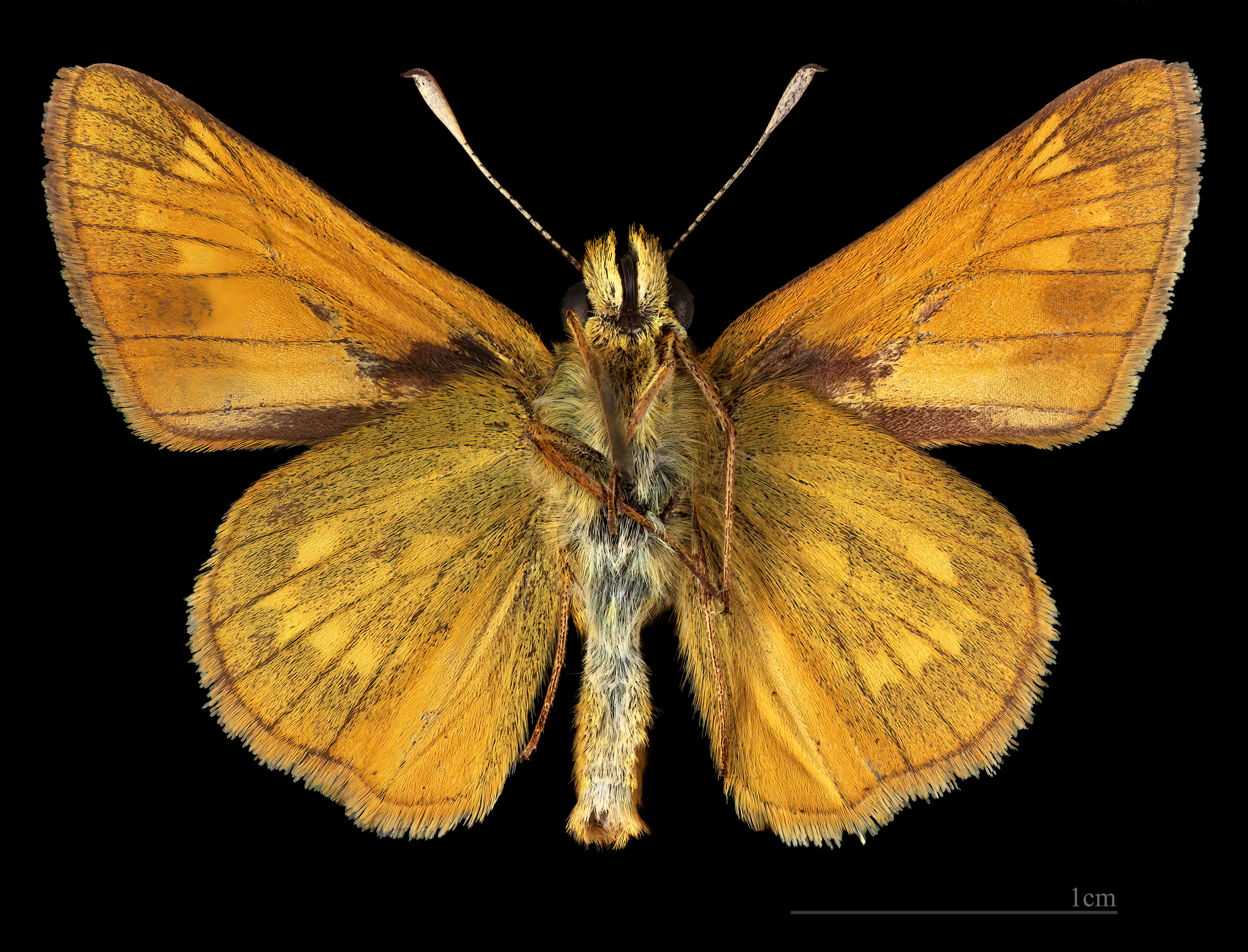
♂ △

The faint chequered pattern on both the upperside and underside, and also the hook-shaped antenna tips, help to distinguish the large skipper from these two orange skippers. The Lulworth skipper also has patterned wings, but does not have the hooked antennae.

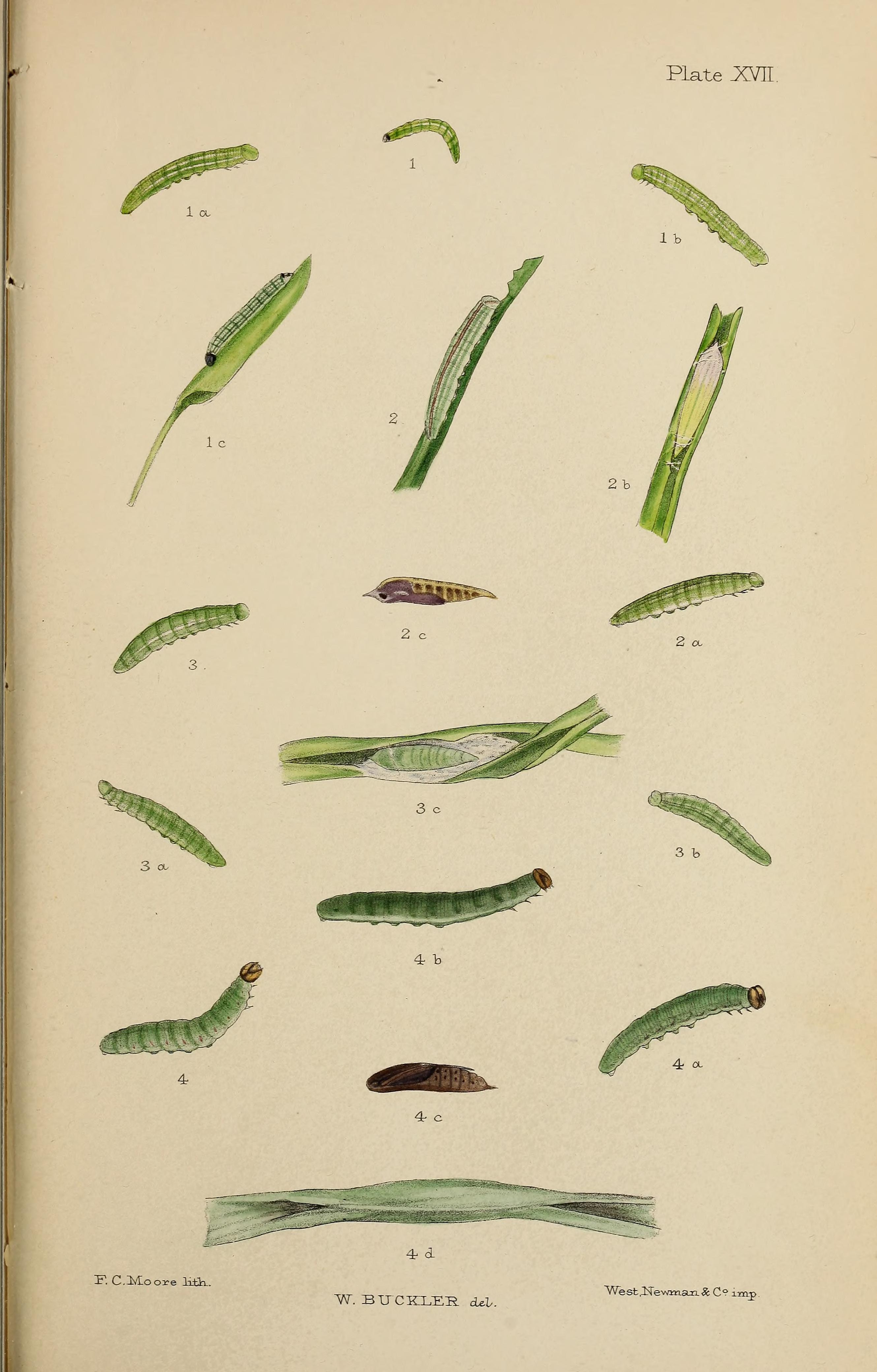
Figs 4, 4a, 4b larvae after last moult; 4c pupa;4d folded leaf of Luzula pilosa containing a pupa

The caterpillar can reach a length of 28 millimetres (1.1 in). It has a large blackish-brown head and a bluish green body, with a dark line down its back and a yellow stripe along each side.

== Life cycle and foodplants ==
In northern Europe these butterflies have a single brood, but in the south they may have up to three broods.

Eggs are laid singly on the underside of foodplant leaves and hatch after about two weeks. They are normally laid on cocksfoot (Dactylis glomerata) but they will occasionally use purple moor-grass (Molinia caerulea), false brome (Brachypodium sylvaticum), tor-grass (B. pinnatum) and wood small-reed (Calamagrostis epigejos). Larvae also feed on various Poaceae, Phalaris arundinacea, Alopecurus pratensis, Calamagrostis purpurea, Deschampsia flexuosa, Phragmites communis and Elymus caninus., but also on Festuca, Triticum, Dactylis glomerata, Molinia, Holcus lanatus, Luzula, etc.

On hatching the larvae construct a shelter in the usual skipper method of curling a leaf up with silk and begins to feed. It hibernates as a half-grown caterpillar and emerges in the spring to continue feeding and growing.

Pupation lasts about three weeks during May and June and the adults are present from June to August. It is the first of the grass skippers to emerge in the UK. It is an active butterfly in sunny weather, it is attracted to various flowers but has a distinct liking for bramble flowers.

== Gallery ==
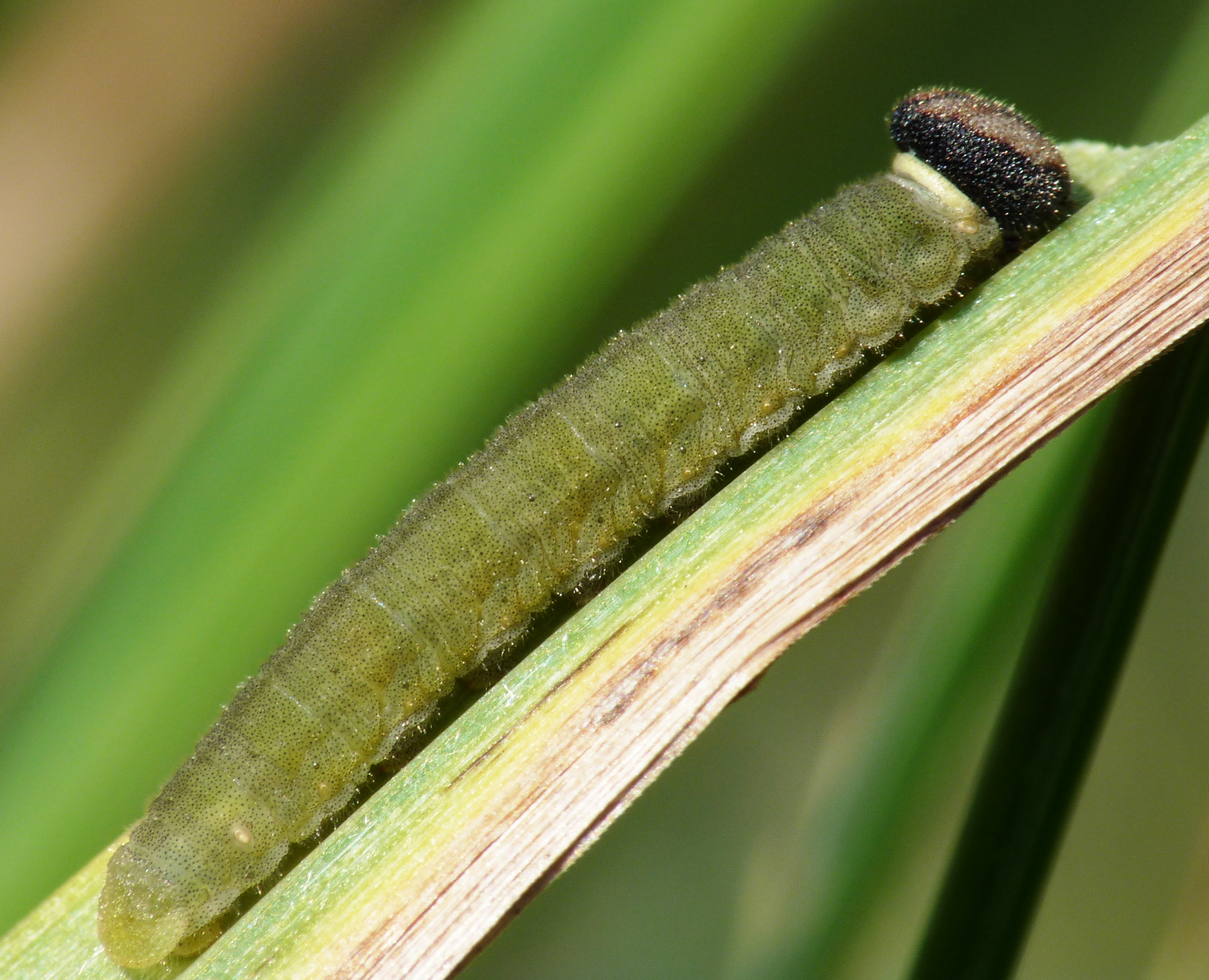
Caterpillar

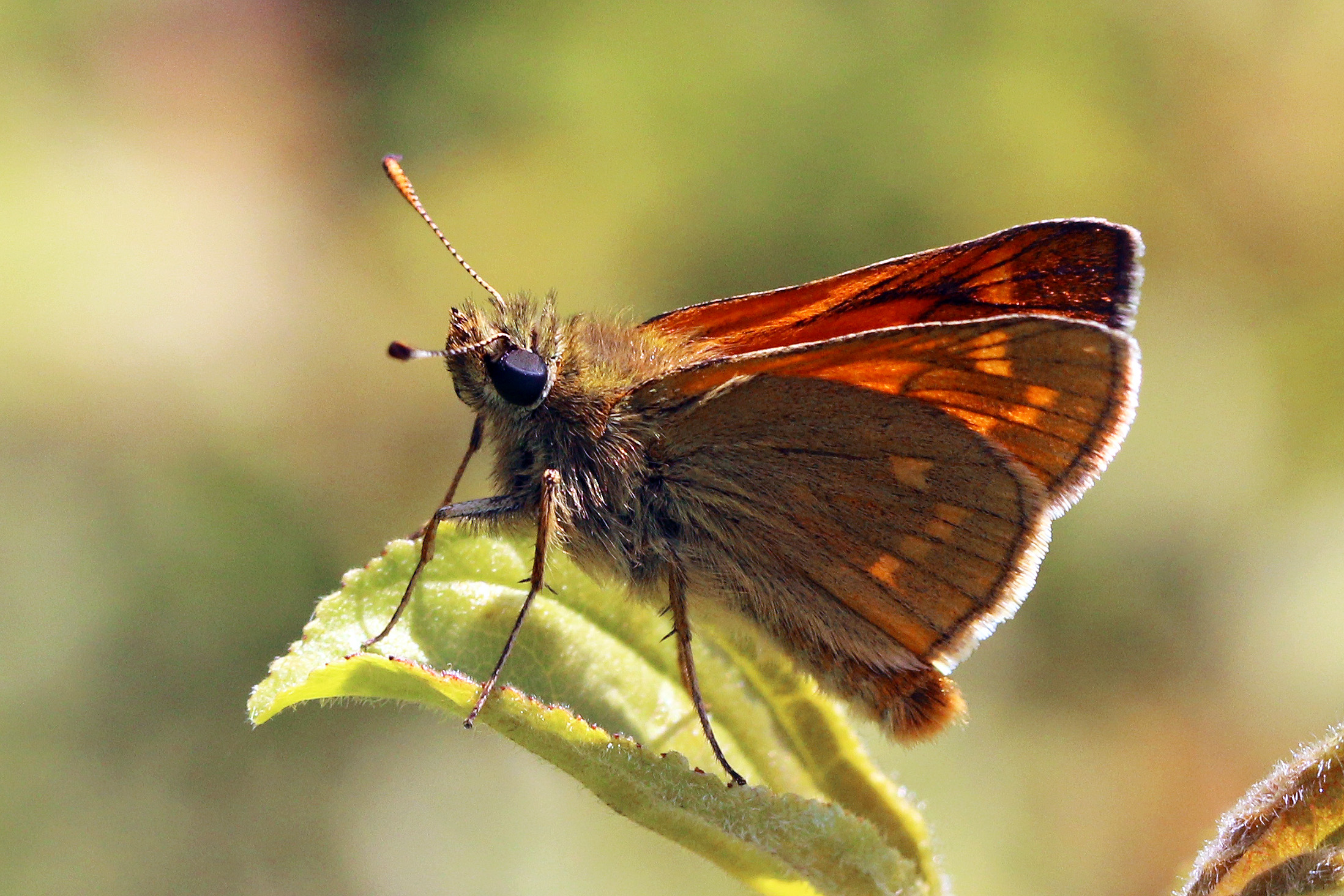
Male, underside

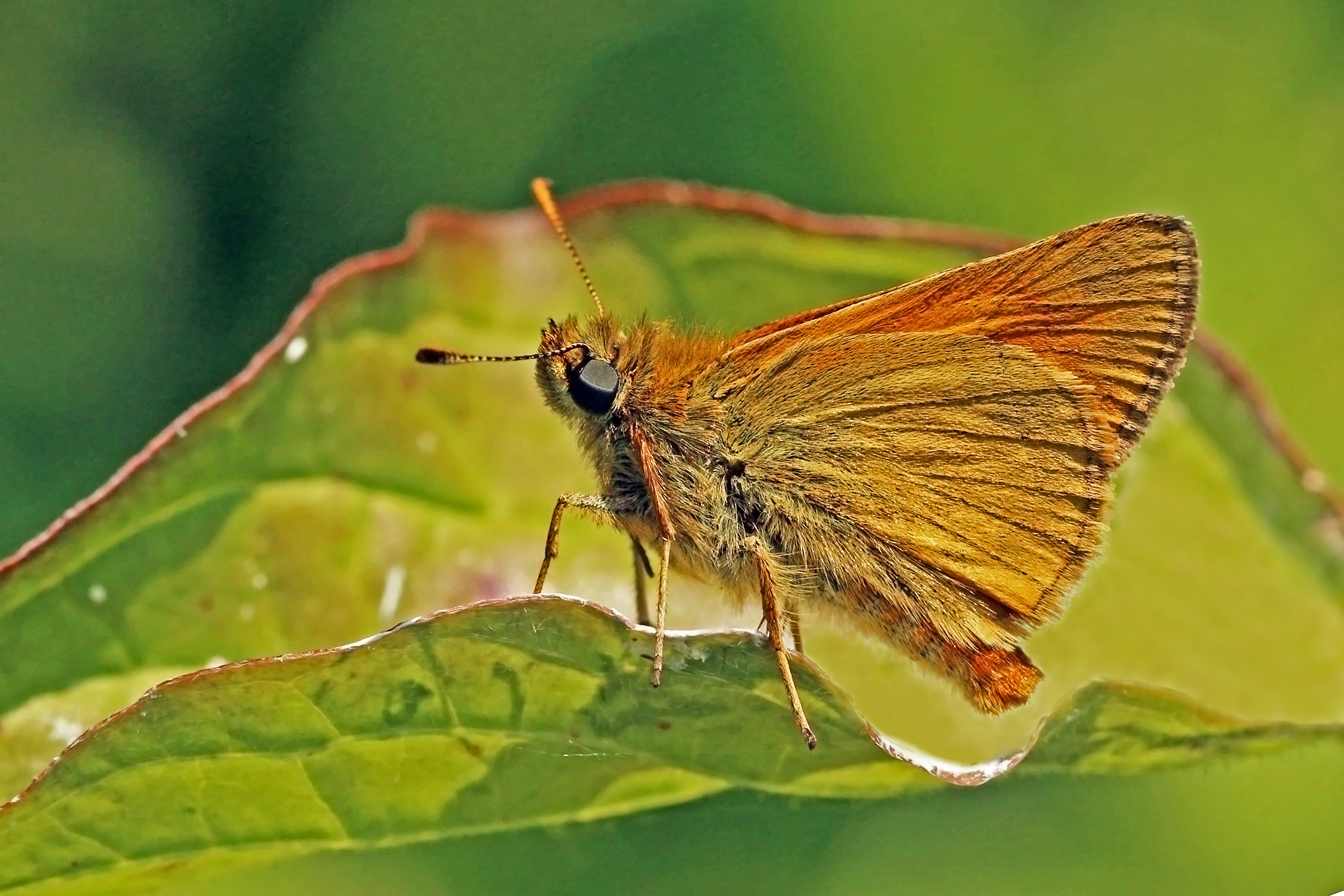
Aberration
no chequered marks

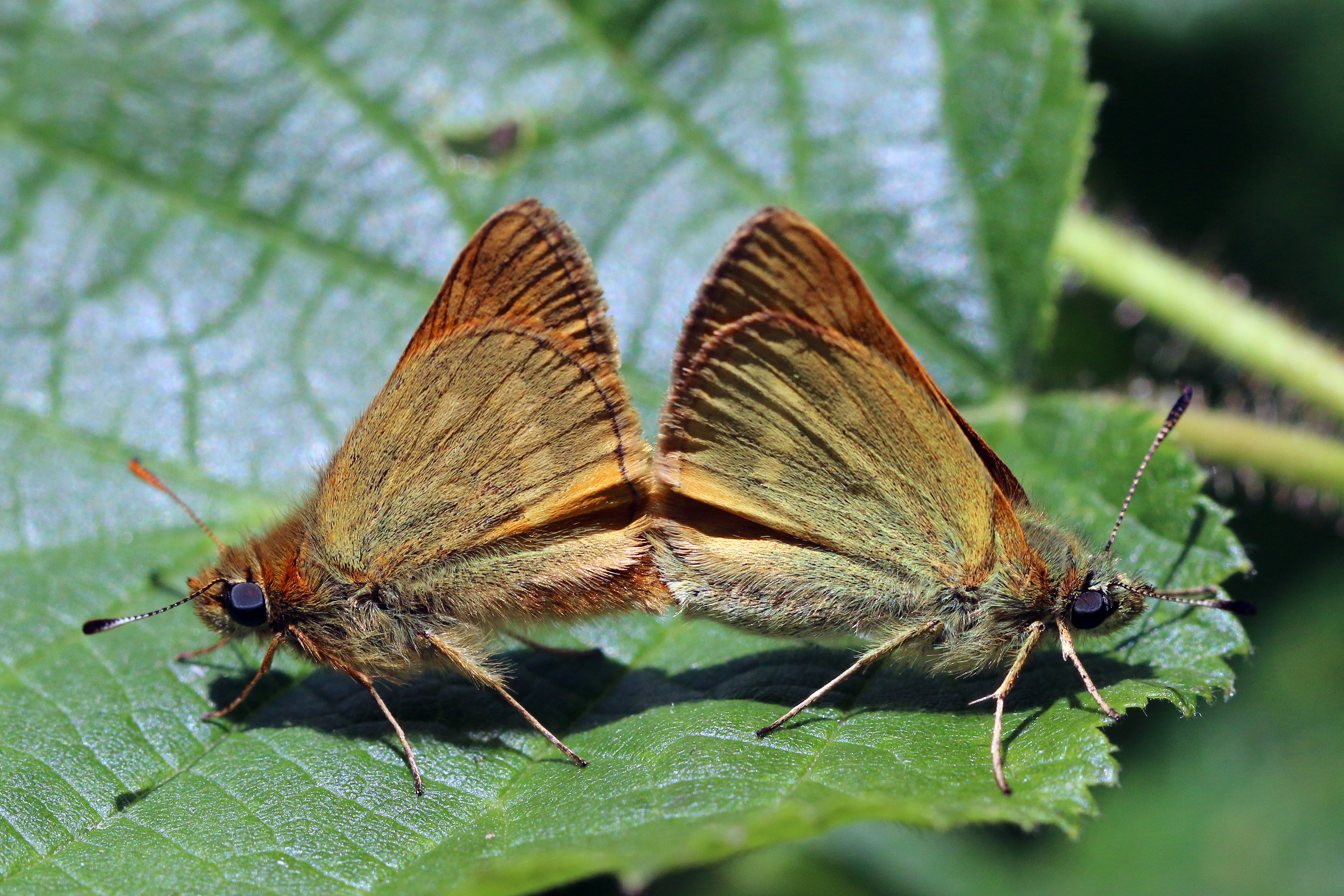
Mating

== See also ==
- List of butterflies of Great Britain
- List of butterflies in Sweden
- List of Lepidoptera of Germany
