= Yakhontov =

Yakhontov (Russian: Яхонтов) is a Russian masculine surname originating from the old Russian word yakhont, which referred to a precious stone such as ruby or sapphire; its feminine counterpart is Yakhontova. It may refer to

- Alexander Yakhontov (1879–1973), Russian entomologist
- Sergei Yakhontov (1926–2018), Russian linguist
- Vladimir Yakhontov (1899–1970), Soviet and Uzbek entomologist
