= Catocala artobolevskiji =

Scientific classification
- Kingdom: Animalia
- Phylum: Arthropoda
- Class: Insecta
- Order: Lepidoptera
- Superfamily: Noctuoidea
- Family: Erebidae
- Genus: Catocala
- Species: C. artobolevskiji

Binomial name
- Catocala artobolevskiji Sheljuzhko, 1943

Species of moth

Catocala artobolevskiji is a moth in the family Erebidae first described by Leo Sheljuzhko in 1943. It is found in Uzbekistan.
