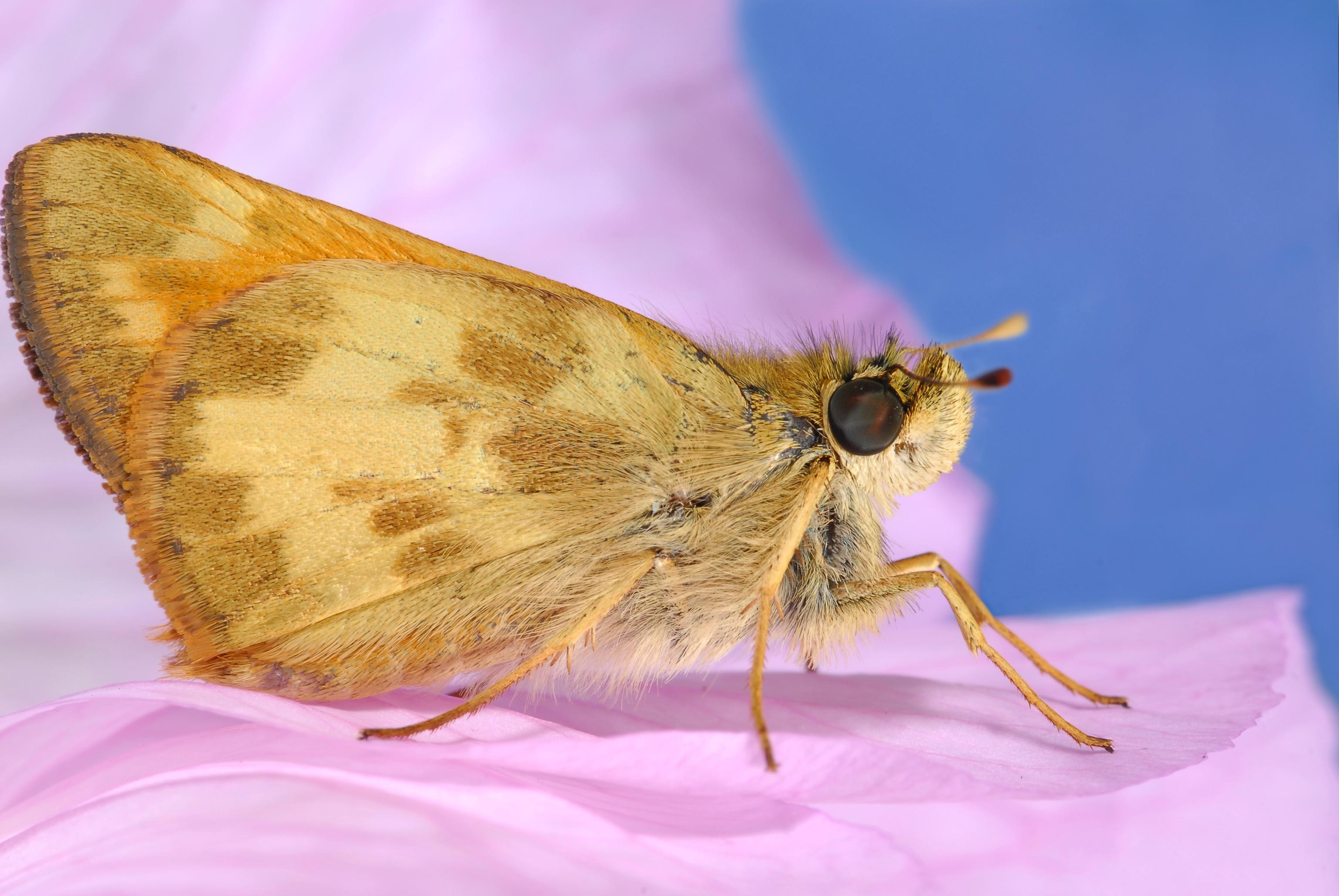

Conservation status
- Secure (NatureServe)

Scientific classification
- Kingdom: Animalia
- Phylum: Arthropoda
- Class: Insecta
- Order: Lepidoptera
- Family: Hesperiidae
- Genus: Ochlodes
- Species: O. sylvanoides

Binomial name
- Ochlodes sylvanoides (Boisduval, 1852)

Synonyms
- Hesperia sylvanoides Boisduval, 1852; Anthomaster sylvanoides; Hesperia pratincola Boisduval, 1852; Hesperia francisca Plötz, 1883

= Ochlodes sylvanoides =

Species of butterfly

Ochlodes sylvanoides, the woodland skipper, is a butterfly of the family Hesperiidae. It is found in North America from British Columbia south to southern California, east to Montana, Colorado and Arizona.

== Description ==
Uppersides of wings are orange with dark borders. Males have black androconia on their forewings, while females have two dark markings on their forewings. The undersides of the wings are variable, but generally light brown with lighter spots. The wingspan is 25–32 millimetres (0.98–1.26 in)

== Habitat and behavior ==
The woodland skipper is found in a wide range of habitats, including woodlands, gardens, and other areas with grasses. The larvae feed on various Poaceae species, including Cynodon dactylon, Phalaris, Elymus and Agropyron species. Adults feed on flower nectar, and are active midsummer to fall.

== Subspecies ==
- Ochlodes sylvanoides sylvanoides (California, Mexico)
- Ochlodes sylvanoides pratincola (Boisduval, 1852)
- Ochlodes sylvanoides napa (Edwards, 1865)
- Ochlodes sylvanoides bonnevilla Scott, 1981 (Nevada) – Bonneville skipper
- Ochlodes sylvanoides orecoasta Scott, 1981 (Oregon) – Oregon coast skipper
- Ochlodes sylvanoides santacruza Scott, 1981 (northern California)
- Ochlodes sylvanoides omnigena Austin, 1998 (Nevada, Great Basin)
- Ochlodes sylvanoides catalina Emmel & Emmel, 1998
