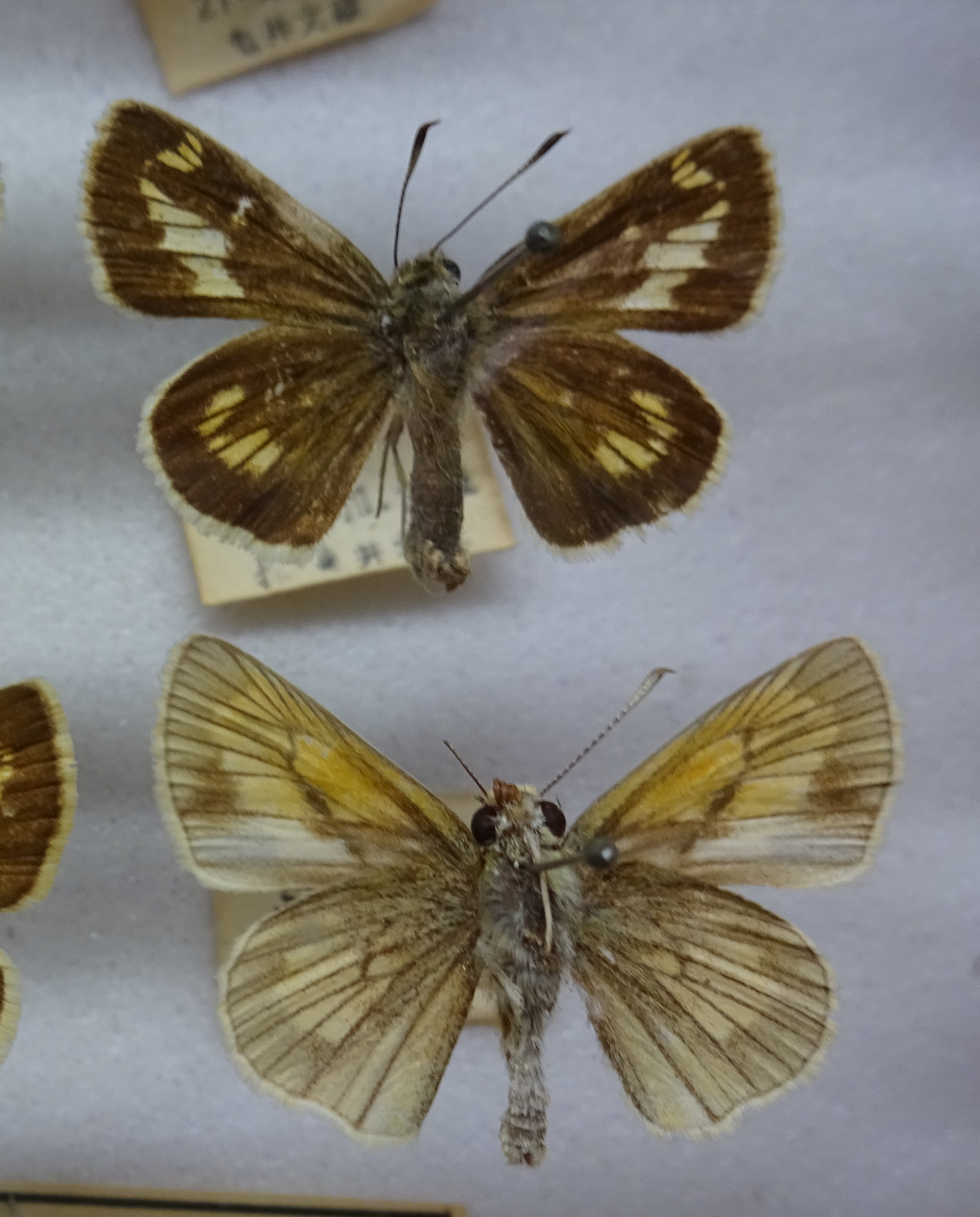

Scientific classification
- Kingdom: Animalia
- Phylum: Arthropoda
- Class: Insecta
- Order: Lepidoptera
- Family: Hesperiidae
- Genus: Ochlodes
- Species: O. ochracea

Binomial name
- Ochlodes ochracea (Bremer, 1861)

Synonyms
- Pamphila ochracea Bremer, 1861; Pamphila rikuchina Butler, 1878

= Ochlodes ochracea =

Species of butterfly

Ochlodes ochracea is a Palearctic butterfly in the Hesperiidae (Hesperiinae). It is found in Amur, Southeast China and Japan.

The larva feeds on Carex, Calamagrostis and Brachypodium species.
