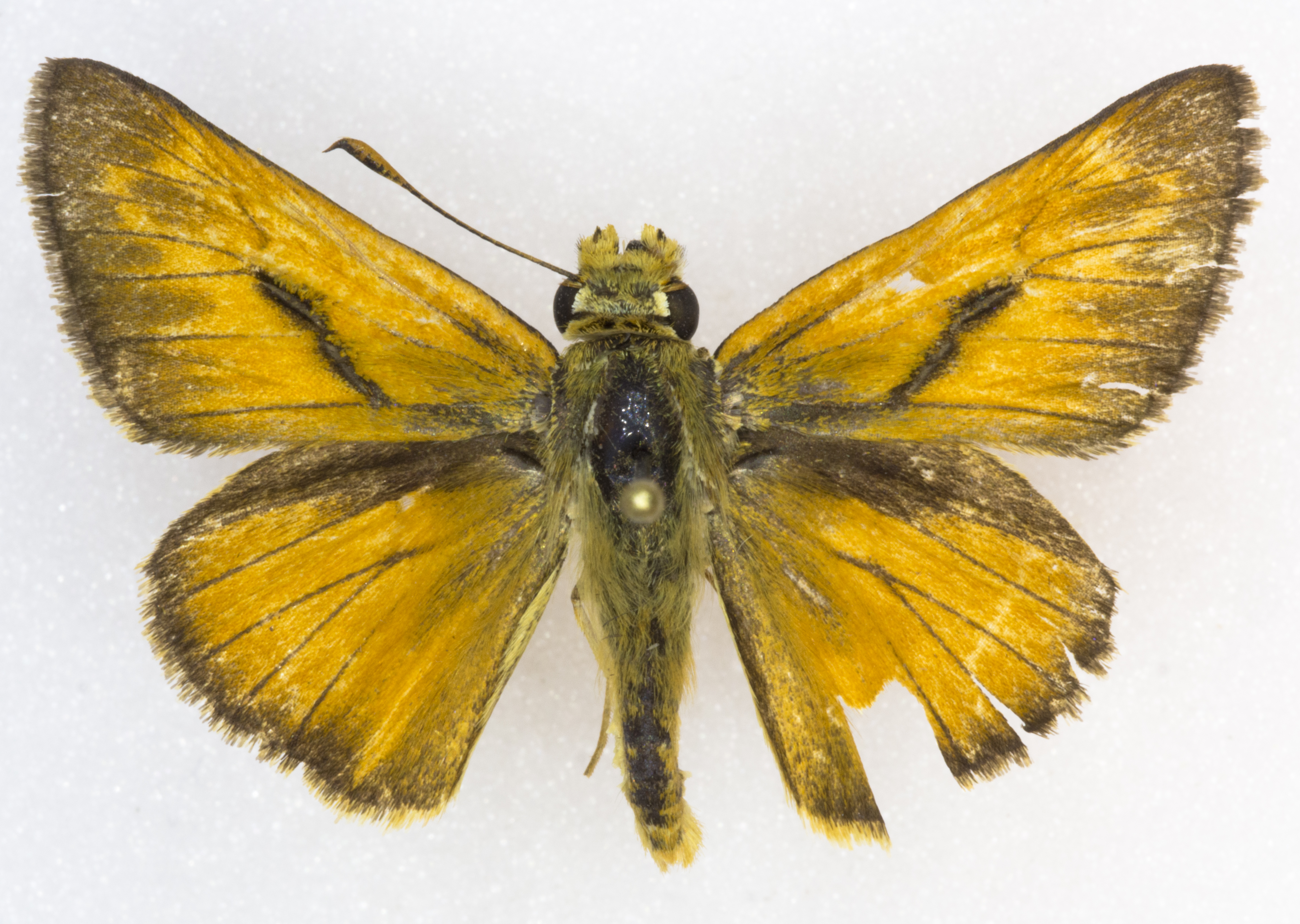
- Male specie of Ochlodes yuma

Conservation status
- Apparently Secure (NatureServe)

Scientific classification
- Kingdom: Animalia
- Phylum: Arthropoda
- Clade: Pancrustacea
- Class: Insecta
- Order: Lepidoptera
- Family: Hesperiidae
- Genus: Ochlodes
- Species: O. yuma

Binomial name
- Ochlodes yuma (W. H. Edwards, 1873)

= Ochlodes yuma =

Species of butterfly

Ochlodes yuma, the Yuma skipper, is a species of grass skipper in the butterfly family Hesperiidae that lives in wetlands of western North America. Its only known host is common reed (Phragmites australis).

== Subspecies ==
These five subspecies belong to the species Ochlodes yuma:

- Ochlodes yuma anasazi S. Cary & Stanford, 1995
- Ochlodes yuma lutea Austin in T. Emmel, 1998
- Ochlodes yuma sacramentorum Austin in T. Emmel, 1998
- Ochlodes yuma scudderi (Skinner, 1899)
- Ochlodes yuma yuma (W. H. Edwards, 1873)
