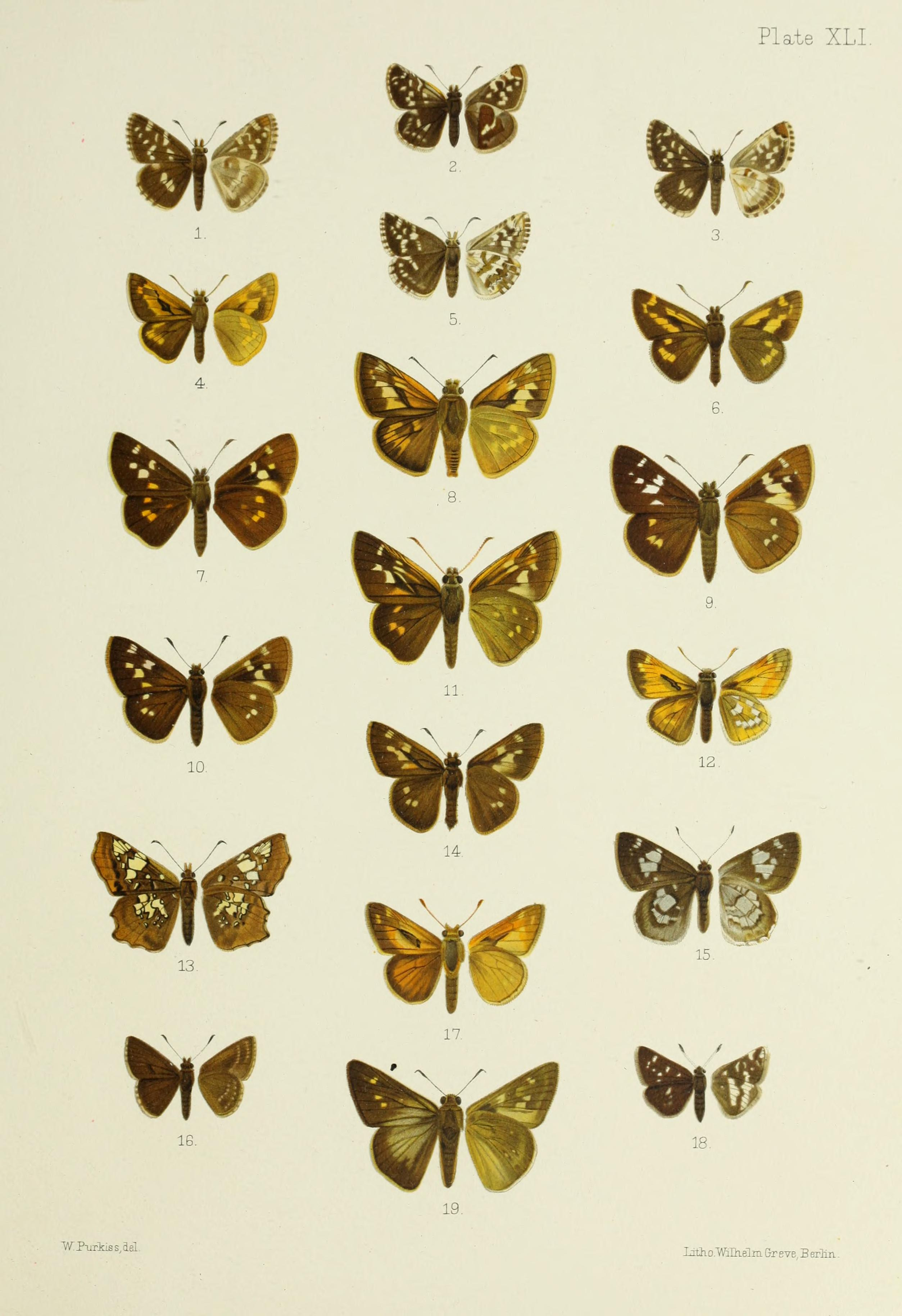
- In Leech Butterflies from China, Japan, and Corea (1892) Fig.8

Scientific classification
- Kingdom: Animalia
- Phylum: Arthropoda
- Class: Insecta
- Order: Lepidoptera
- Family: Hesperiidae
- Genus: Ochlodes
- Species: O. subhyalina

Binomial name
- Ochlodes subhyalina (Bremer & Grey, 1853)

Synonyms
- Hesperia subhyalina Bremer & Grey, 1853; Augiades formosana Matsumura, 1919

= Ochlodes subhyalina =

Species of butterfly

Ochlodes subhyalina is an eastern Palearctic butterfly in the family Hesperiidae and subfamily Hesperiinae. It is found in Mongolia, Korea, Japan, India, Myanmar and Taiwan. The species was first described by Otto Vasilievich Bremer and William Grey in 1853.

== Subspecies ==
- O. s. subhyalina (N. China, Japan, Korea)
- O. s. chayuensis Huang, 2001 (Tibet)
- O. s. pasca Evans, 1949 (Khasi Hills, Assam, Sikkim)
- O. s. formosana (Matsumura, 1919) (Taiwan)
- O. s. asahinai Shirôzu, 1964 (Yonehara, Ishigaki Is., Yaeyama Group, Ryukyus, Japan)
