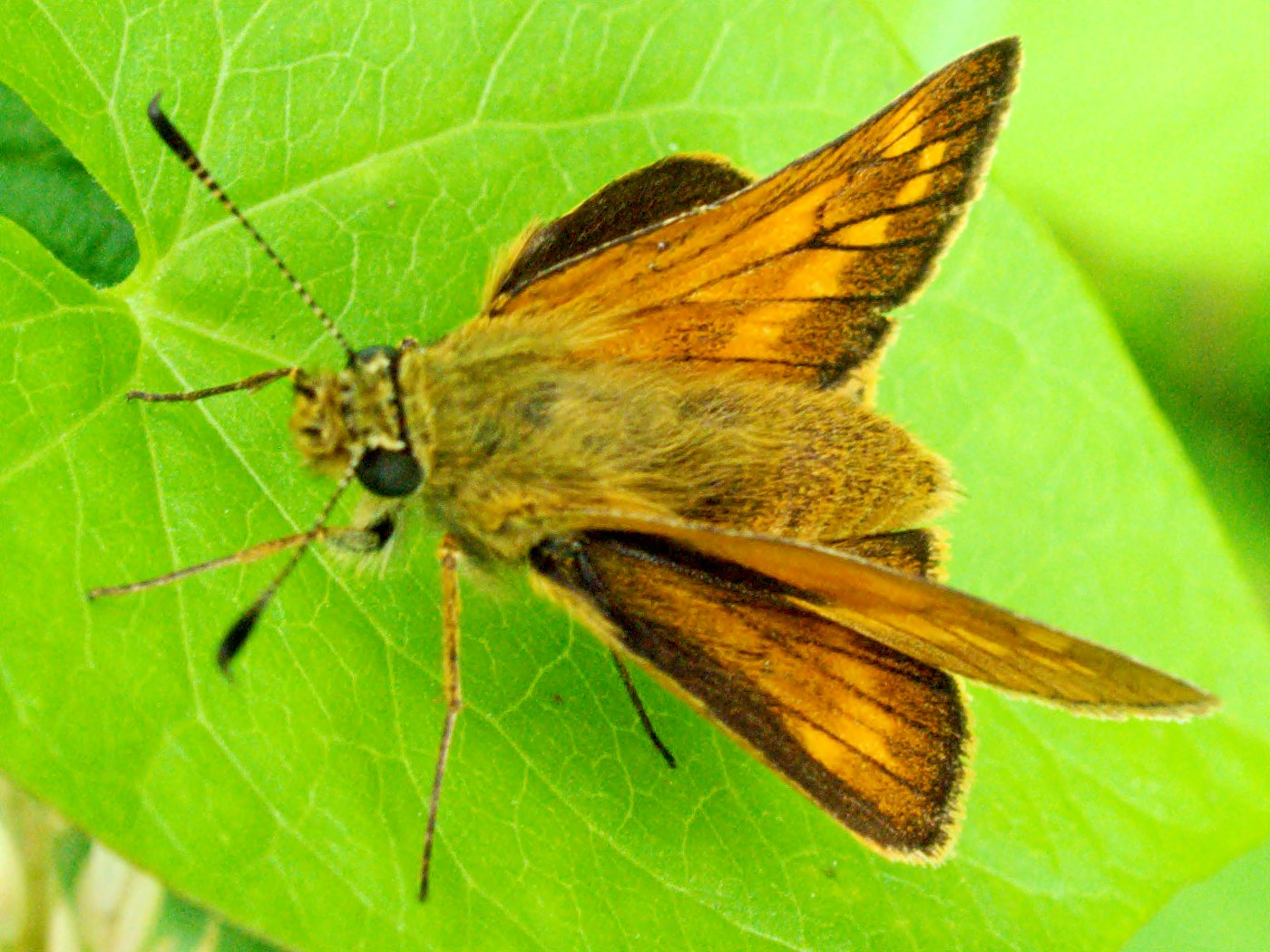
- Female large skipper (Ochlodes sylvanus)

Scientific classification
- Kingdom: Animalia
- Phylum: Arthropoda
- Clade: Pancrustacea
- Class: Insecta
- Order: Lepidoptera
- Family: Hesperiidae
- Subtribe: Hesperiina
- Genus: Ochlodes; Scudder, 1872

Species
- Numerous; see text.

= Ochlodes =

Genus of butterflies

Ochlodes is a Holarctic genus in the skipper butterfly family, Hesperiidae. The genus is placed in the tribe Hesperiini.

Examples of Ochlodes species:

- Ochlodes agricola Boisduval 1852 - USA (Oregon, California), Mexico (Baja California)
- Ochlodes amurensis Mabille 1909 - Russia (Amur Oblast)
- Ochlodes asahinai Shirozu - Japan
- Ochlodes batesi Bell 1935 - Hispaniola (Dominican Republic, Haiti)
- Ochlodes bouddha Mabille 1876 - China
- Ochlodes brahma Moore 1878 - Northwest Himalayas
- Ochlodes crataeis Leech 1893 - China
- Ochlodes flavomaculata Draeseke & Reuss - China
- Ochlodes formosana Matsumura 1919 - Taiwan
- Ochlodes hasegawai Chiba & Tsukiyama 1996 - China
- Ochlodes hyrcanna Christoph 1893 - Iran
- Ochlodes klapperichii Evans 1940 - China
- Ochlodes lanta Evans 1939 - China
- Ochlodes linga Evans 1939 - China
- Ochlodes niitakana Sonan, 1936 - Taiwan
- Ochlodes ochracea Bremer 1861 - East Asia
- Ochlodes parvus Kurentzov 1970 - Mongolia
- Ochlodes sagitta Hemming 1934 - China
- Ochlodes samenta Dyar 1914 - Mexico
- Ochlodes similis Leech 1893 - China
- Ochlodes siva Moore 1878 - East and Southeast Asia
- Ochlodes snowi (WH Edwards 1877) - Central and western USA to Mexico
- Ochlodes subhyalina Bremer & Grey 1853 - South, Southeast and East Asia
- Ochlodes sylvanoides (Boisduval 1852), woodland skipper - western North America
- Ochlodes sylvanus Esper 1778, large skipper - Eurasia
- Ochlodes thibetana Oberthuer 1886 - China (Sichuan, Tibet, Yunnan)
- Ochlodes venatus Bremer & Grey 1853 - East Asia
- Ochlodes yuma (WH Edwards 1873), Yuma skipper or giant-reed skipper – western USA

== References and external links ==
- Systematic list of the butterflies of Norway
- Canadian Biodiversity Information Facility
- Species records from University of Colorado Museum
- Skipper news: taxonomic Hesperiinae
- Images representing Ochlodes at Consortium for the Barcode of Life
