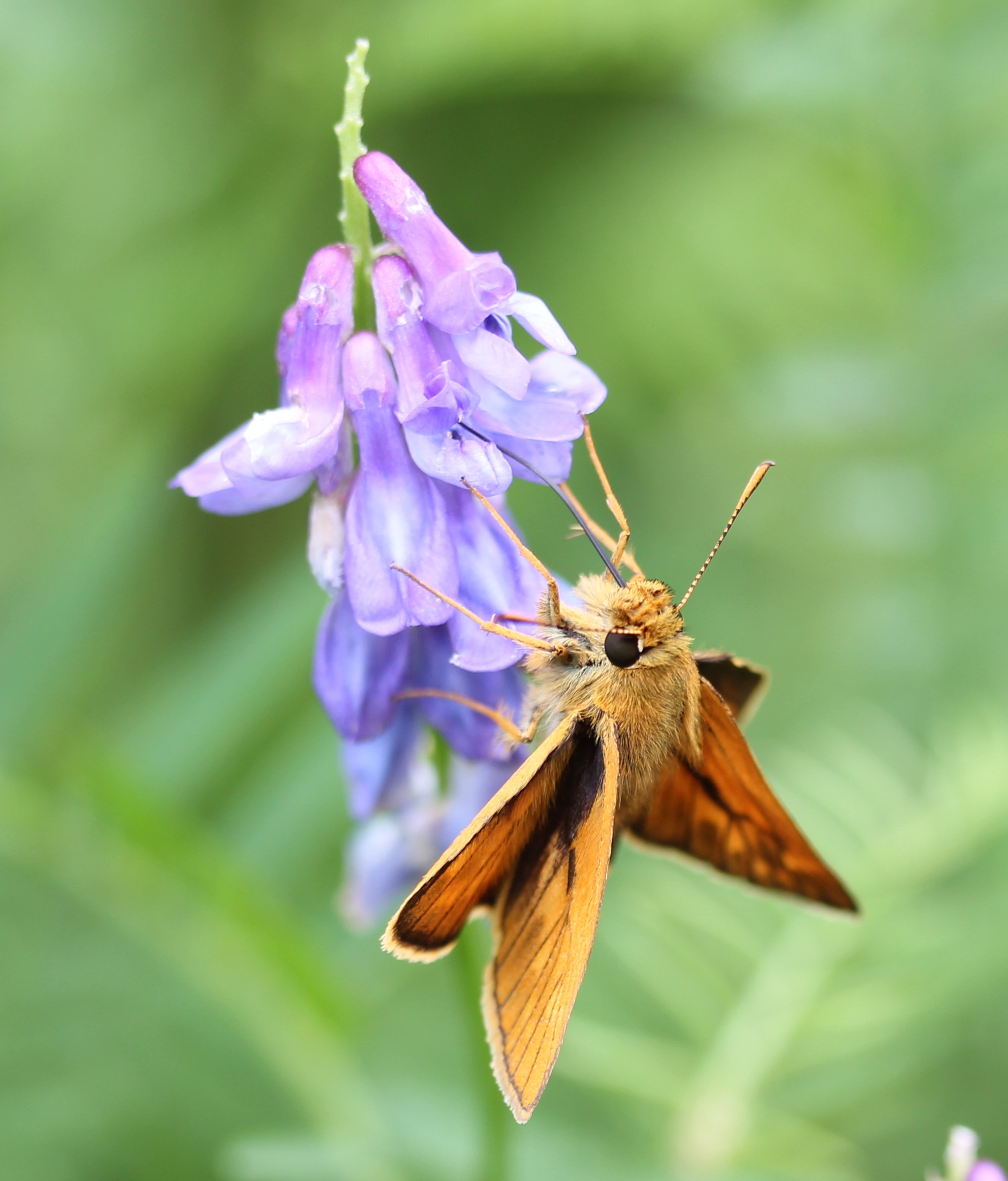

Scientific classification
- Kingdom: Animalia
- Phylum: Arthropoda
- Clade: Pancrustacea
- Class: Insecta
- Order: Lepidoptera
- Family: Hesperiidae
- Genus: Ochlodes
- Species: O. venatus

Binomial name
- Ochlodes venatus (Bremer & Grey, 1853)

= Ochlodes venatus =

Species of butterfly

Ochlodes venatus, commonly known as the far eastern large skipper, is a skipper butterfly species in the family Hesperiidae. The name was long used for the large skipper of Europe, but it actually refers to its Far Eastern sister species and the large skipper is now called O. sylvanus. There is some dispute however about whether the large skipper should not better placed in O. venatus as a subspecies sylvanus or faunus. An ICZN Opinion in 1944 noted that the genus name Ochlodes is masculine, so the correct epithet for this species is venatus. However, many sources continue to list it as Ochlodes venata.

These two skippers are possibly sympatric in China. Ochlodes venatus occurs from there eastwards to Korea and Japan.
