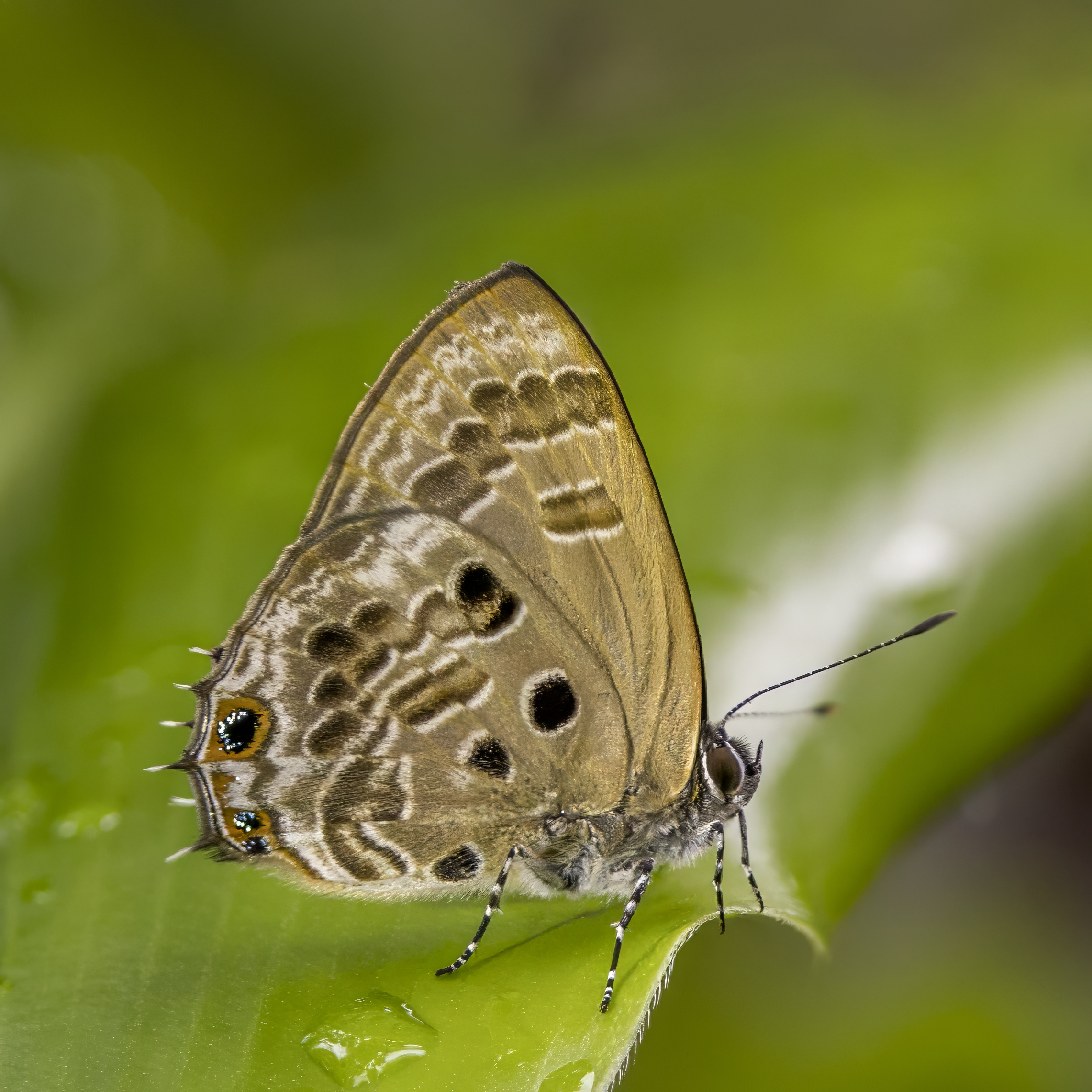
- Male A. s. sylvanus, Ghana

Scientific classification
- Kingdom: Animalia
- Phylum: Arthropoda
- Clade: Pancrustacea
- Class: Insecta
- Order: Lepidoptera
- Family: Lycaenidae
- Genus: Anthene
- Species: A. sylvanus

Binomial name
- Anthene sylvanus (Drury, 1773)

Synonyms
- Papilio sylvanus Drury, 1773; Anthene (Anthene) sylvanus; Papilio moncus Fabricius, 1781; Timolus syllidus Hübner, 1826; Lycaenesthes locra Plötz, 1880; Lycaenesthes sylvanus var. natalensis Staudinger and Schatz, 1888; Lycaenesthes ukerewensis var. albicans Grünberg, 1910; Anthene sylvanus bugalla Stempffer and Jackson, 1962

= Anthene sylvanus =

Species of butterfly

Anthene sylvanus, the common indigo ciliate blue, is a butterfly in the family Lycaenidae. It is found in Senegal, Guinea-Bissau, Guinea, Sierra Leone, Burkina Faso, Liberia, Ivory Coast, Ghana, Togo, Benin, Nigeria, Cameroon, Gabon, the Republic of the Congo, the Central African Republic, the Democratic Republic of the Congo, Uganda and Tanzania. The habitat consists of forests and dense Guinea savanna.

== Subspecies ==
- Anthene sylvanus sylvanus (Senegal, Guinea-Bissau, Guinea, Sierra Leone, Burkina Faso, Liberia, Ivory Coast, Ghana, Togo, Benin, Nigeria: south and the Cross River loop, Cameroon, Gabon, Congo, Central African Republic, Democratic Republic of the Congo: Mongala, Uele, Ituri, Kivu, Tshopo, Kinshasa, Cataractes, Sankuru, Mamiema, Lualaba, Tanganika and Shaba)
- Anthene sylvanus albicans (Grünberg, 1910) (southern Uganda, north-western Tanzania)
- Anthene sylvanus niveus Stempffer, 1954 (Democratic Republic of the Congo: Equator)

Torben Larsen developed a species numbering system for his 2005 publication Butterflies of West Africa. The nominate subspecies is #510. The 'Larsen' numbers have since been used with permission in A Sharp Eye on Butterflies of Ghana.
