= Alexander Yakhontov =

Alexander Alexandrovich Yakhontov (Russian: Александр Александрович Яхонтов; 20 December [O.S. 8 December] 1879, Moscow – 17 November 1973, Moscow) was an entomologist who specialized in Lepidoptera.

Jachontov described many new taxa mostly at the subspecies level and wrote biogeographic works notably on the Rhopalocera of the Vladimir and Nizhny Novgorod regions and those of the Caucasus. He wrote Nashi dnevnye babochki (Our Butterflies) published in Moscow in 1935.

His work appears in

- Revue Russe d’Entomologie, Moscow
- Izvestia Moskovskogo entomologicheskogo obstshestva, Moscow
- Izvestija Kavkazskogo Museja, Tiflis
- Ent., Mater. Pozn. Fauny Flory SSSR

The species Pararge jachontovi sheljuzhko was named for him.
