= Leo Sheljuzhko =

Ukrainian-German entomologist (1890–1969)

- Лев Шелюжко (Ukrainian)
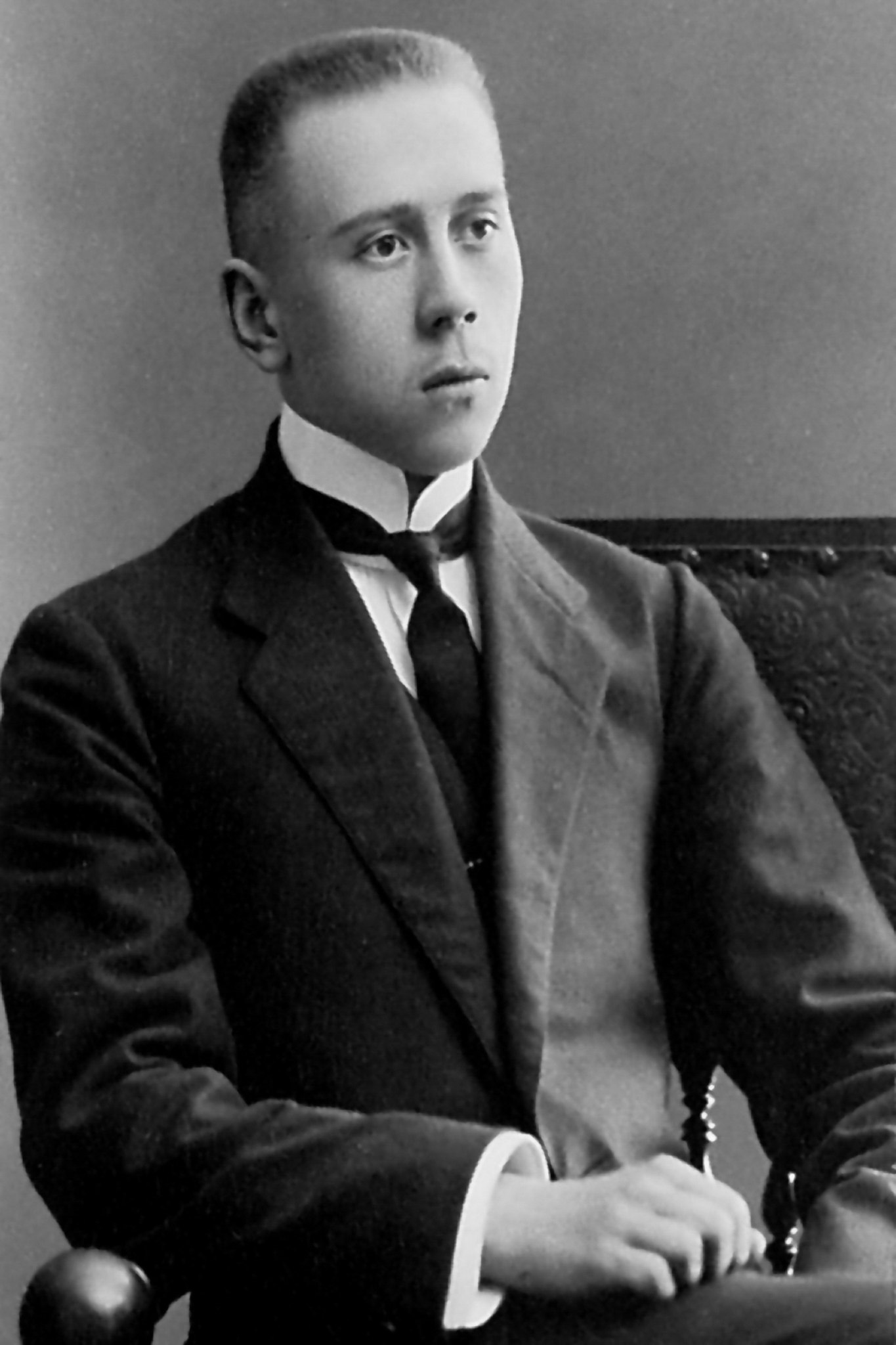
- Born: 26 September 1890; Kyiv, Russian Empire
- Died: 22 September 1969 (aged 78); Munich, West Germany
- Citizenship: Russian Empire (1890–1917); Ukrainian People's Republic (1917–1920); USSR (1922-1941); Germany (1941-1969)
- Education: Taras Shevchenko National University of Kyiv
- Scientific career
- Fields: Entomology
- Workplaces: Shcherbak Zoology Museum; University of Kyiv; Zoologische Staatssammlung München
- Notable students: Yurii Nekrutenko

Leo Andreyevich Sheljuzhko (Ukrainian: Лев Андрійович Шелюжко, German: Leo Andrejewitsch Sheljuzhko; 14 September 1890, Kiev – 22 August 1969, Munich) was a Ukrainian-German entomologist who specialized in Lepidoptera, Rhopalocera. He wrote numerous scientific papers and books on the butterflies and moths of Central Asia, Ukraine, Far East, Caucasus in Russian, Ukrainian, German, and English, and described many new taxa.

== Life ==
He was born in 1890, the son of Andrei Ivanovich Shelyuzhko, a wealthy Ukrainian landowner. He studied at Kyiv University, and after completing his studies in 1912, he opened a business where he sold exotic plants and animals, the largest in the Russian Empire. He invested the profits in buying specimens of Lepidoptera from collectors and organizing expeditions, mostly to Central Asia and Caucasus. From 1918, he worked as a curator at the Shcherbak Zoology Museum of the Ukrainian Academy of Sciences. In 1933–1941, he was a curator at Zoology Museum in Kiev University where he was installing his own Rhopalocera collection.

When the city was invaded and occupied by Nazi Germany in 1941 Shelyuzhko remained under the German occupation, as his collection was left in Kyiv by University authorities as not valuable. As the Red Army approached Kiev in 1943, he was forced to flee to Germany with his butterfly specimens. Rail cars with the collection were lost in Eastern Prussia, while Shelyuzhko got to Munich where he remained for the rest of his life, eventually taking West German citizenship. From 1945 to his death in 1969, he was a researcher at the Bavarian State Zoological Collections in Munich.

== Science ==
Leo Shelyuzhko was among the first aquarium amateurs and tropical fish breeder in the Russian Empire. He was first to bring and breed piranha and Callichthys callichthys in Russia.

While working in University Museum Shelyuzhko organized several entomological expeditions to mountainous regions of USSR to collect and describe Lepidoptera species (Pamir Mountains, Armenia, Dagestan). He issued many works of new species and systematics of Rhopalocera. His collection had worldwide specimens of geni Parnassius and Colias.

His collection remains in the Taras Shevchenko National University of Kyiv. During World War II, it was lost by Germans and found by Soviet military and taken to Moscow. In 1946 it returned to Kiev. It consists of more than 300.000 specimens of Lepidoptera.

== Works ==
A partial list of his works include:

- Neue palaearctische Heteroceren Deutsch. Ent. Zeit. Iris 40: 56-65 9 (1926).
- Lepidopterologische Ergebnisse der Pamir-Expedition des Kijever Zoologischen Museums im Jahre 1937. II. Neue Lepidopteren aus dem westlichen Pamir Mitt. Munchn. Ent. Ges. Bd. 33. S. 75–85 (1943).
- Zur Kenntnis der Pieris melete-Gruppe Zeitschr. wiener ent. Ges., 45: 4–13, 20–29, 36–51, 5 pis., 2 figs. Monograph. The involved synonymy is given in full (1960).
- Zur Kenntnis der Pieris melete-Gruppe. Teil II. Nordliche Inseln: Sachalin (= Saghalien, Karafuto) und die Kurilen Zeitschr. wiener ent. Ges., 48: 6–10, 51–64, 141, 5 pis., 1 map. 1963.

== Literature ==
- Некрутенко Ю. П.; Чиколовець, В. В. (2005), "Нарис історії дослідження денних метеликів України", Денні метелики України (in Ukrainian), Київ: Вид-во Раєвського, p. 232
- W. Vorster (1971). "Leo Sheljuzhko. 1890 — 1969" (PDF). Nachrichten der Bayerischen Entomologen (in German). 5: 81–86. Archived from the original (PDF) on 2014-01-04.
- Biljaschivs'kij, M. M. 2004: Leo A. and Andryi I. Sheljuzhko the Creators of the Lepidoptera Collection of the Zoological Museum of Kyjv Taras Shevchenko National University. New Facts for their Biographies. Praci Zool. muz. KNUT. Schevtsch 27–43.
