= List of butterflies of Japan =

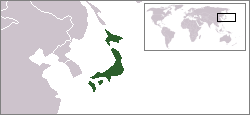
Location of Japan

This is a list of butterflies of Japan. About 327 species are known from Japan.

Japan is home to a nine forest ecoregions, which reflect its climate and geography. The islands that constitute Japan generally have a humid climate, which ranges from warm subtropical in the southern islands to cool temperate on the northern island of Hokkaidō.

Japan lies at the convergence of three terrestrial realms, the Palearctic, Indomalaya, and Oceania, and its flora and fauna combine elements from all three. The ecoregions that cover the main islands of Japan, Honshū, Hokkaidō, Kyūshū, and Shikoku, along with the nearby islands, are considered part of the Palearctic realm. The island arcs of southern Japan, the Ryukyu Islands to the southwest and the Ogasawara Islands to the southeast, are home to subtropical moist broadleaf forest ecoregions; the Nansei Islands subtropical evergreen forests ecoregion is part of the Indomalayan realm, while the Ogasawara subtropical moist forests of the Ogasawaras is part of the Oceanian realm.

The terrestrial ecoregions are:

1. Temperate broadleaf and mixed forests: Hokkaidō deciduous forests, Nihonkai evergreen forests, Nihonkai montane deciduous forests, Taiheiyo evergreen forests, Taiheiyo montane deciduous forests
2. Temperate coniferous forests: Hokkaidō montane conifer forests, Honshū alpine conifer forests
3. Tropical and subtropical moist broadleaf forests: Nansei Islands subtropical evergreen forests, Ogasawara subtropical moist forests.

The most important and threatened butterfly habitat in Japan is Satoyama a Japanese term applied to the border zone or area between mountain foothills and arable flat land.

== Hesperiidae ==
- Aeromachus inachus inachus (Ménétriès, 1858)
- Badamia exclamationis (Fabricius, 1775)
- Borbo cinnara (Wallace, 1866)
- Burara aquilina aquilina (Speyer, 1879)
- Caltoris cahira (Moore, 1877)
- Carterocephalus palaemon akaishianus Fujioka, 1970
- Carterocephalus palaemon satakei (Matsumura, 1919)
- Carterocephalus silvicola (Meigen, 1830)
- Choaspes benjaminii japonicus (Murray, 1875)
- Daimio tethys tethys (Ménétriès, 1857)
- Erionota torus Evans, 1941
- Erynnis montana montana (Bremer, 1861)
- Hasora badra badra (Moore, [1858])
- Hasora chromus inermis Elwes & Edwards, 1897
- Hasora taminata vairacana Fruhstorfer, 1911
- Hesperia florinda florinda (Butler, 1878)
- Isoteinon lamprospilus lamprospilus C. Felder & R. Felder, 1862
- Leptalina unicolor (Bremer & Grey, 1852)
- Notocrypta curvifascia curvifascia (C. Felder & R. Felder, 1862)
- Ochlodes ochracea (Bremer, 1861)
- Ochlodes subhyalinus asahinai Shirôzu, 1964
- Ochlodes venatus venatus (Bremer & Grey, 1852)
- Parnara bada bada (Moore, 1878)
- Parnara guttata guttata (Bremer & Grey, 1852)
- Parnara ogasawarensis Matsumura, 1906
- Pelopidas agna agna (Moore, [1866])
- Pelopidas jansonis (Butler, 1878)
- Pelopidas mathias oberthuri Evans, 1937
- Polytremis pellucida pellucida (Murray, 1875)
- Potanthus flavus flavus (Murray, 1875)
- Pyrgus maculatus maculatus (Bremer & Grey, 1852)
- Pyrgus malvae unomasahiroi Fujioka, 1994
- Suastus gremius (Fabricius, 1798)
- Tagiades trebellius martinus Plötz, 1884
- Telicota colon hayashikeii Tsukiyama, Chiba & Fujioka, 1997
- Thoressa varia (Murray, 1875)
- Thymelicus leonina hamadakohi Fujioka, 1993
- Thymelicus leonina leonina (Butler, 1878)
- Thymelicus lineola lineola (Ochsenheimer, 1808)
- Thymelicus sylvatica nishimurai Hamada & Fujioka, 1997
- Thymelicus sylvatica sylvatica (Bremer, 1861)
- Udaspes folus (Cramer, [1775])

== Papilionidae ==
- Atrophaneura alcinous alcinous (Klug, 1836)
- Atrophaneura alcinous bradana (Fruhstorfer, 1908)
- Atrophaneura alcinous loochooana (Rothschild, 1896)
- Atrophaneura alcinous miyakoensis (Omoto, 1960)
- Atrophaneura alcinous yakushimana (Esaki & Umeno, 1929)
- Graphium agamemnon (Linnaeus, 1758) vagrant
- Graphium cloanthus kuge (Fruhstorfer, 1908) vagrant
- Graphium doson albidum (Wileman, 1903)
- Graphium doson perillus (Fruhstorfer, 1908)
- Graphium mullah (Alpheraky, 1897) vagrant
- Graphium sarpedon nipponum (Fruhstorfer, 1903)
- Luehdorfia japonica Leech, 1889
- Luehdorfia puziloi inexpecta Sheljuzhko, 1913
- Luehdorfia puziloi yessoensis Rothschild, 1918
- Pachliopta aristolochiae interposita (Fruhstorfer, 1904)
- Papilio alphenor Cramer, [1776] vagrant
- Papilio bianor okinawensis Fruhstorfer, 1898
- Papilio castor Westwood, 1842 vagrant
- Papilio dehaanii dehaanii C. Felder & R. Felder, 1864
- Papilio dehaanii hachijonis Matsumura, 1919
- Papilio dehaanii tokaraensis Fujioka, 1975
- Papilio demoleus demoleus Linnaeus, 1758 vagrant
- Papilio helenus nicconicolens Butler, 1881
- Papilio maackii Ménétriès, 1858
- Papilio machaon hippocrates C. Felder & R. Felder, 1864
- Papilio macilentus macilentus Janson, 1877
- Papilio memnon thunbergii von Siebold, 1824
- Papilio paris nakaharai Shirôzu, 1960 vagrant
- Papilio polytes polytes Linnaeus, 1758
- Papilio protenor demetrius Stoll, [1782]
- Papilio protenor liukiuensis Fruhstorfer, [1899]
- Papilio rumanzovius Eschscholtz, 1821 vagrant
- Papilio ryukyuensis amamiensis (Fujioka, 1981)
- Papilio ryukyuensis ryukyuensis Fujioka, 1975
- Papilio xuthus Linnaeus, 1767
- Parnassius citrinarius citrinarius Motschulsky, 1866
- Parnassius eversmanni daisetsuzanus Matsumura, 1926
- Parnassius stubbendorfii hoenei Schweitzer, 1912
- Parnassius stubbendorfii tateyamai Fujioka, 1997
- Sericinus montela Gray, 1853 exotic
- Troides aeacus kaguya (Nakahara & Esaki, 1930) vagrant
- Troides helena helena (Linnaeus, 1758) vagrant

== Pieridae ==
- Anthocharis cardamines hayashii Fujioka, 1970
- Anthocharis cardamines isshikii Matsumura, 1925
- Anthocharis scolymus scolymus Butler, 1866
- Aporia crataegi adherbal Fruhstorfer, 1910
- Aporia hippia japonica Matsumura, 1919
- Appias albina semperi (Moore, [1905]) vagrant
- Appias indra aristoxemus Fruhstorfer, 1908 vagrant
- Appias libythea (Fabricius, 1775) vagrant
- Appias lyncida formosana (Wallace, 1866)
- Appias maria kabiraensis Murayama, 1970 vagrant
- Appias nero domitia (C. Felder & R. Felder, 1862) vagrant
- Appias panda nathalia (C. Felder & R. Felder, 1862) vagrant
- Appias paulina minato (Fruhstorfer, [1899])
- Catopsilia pomona pomona (Fabricius, 1775)
- Catopsilia pyranthe pyranthe (Linnaeus, 1758)
- Catopsilia scylla (Linnaeus, 1763) vagrant
- Colias erate poliographa Motschulsky, [1861]
- Colias fieldii chinensis Verity, 1909 vagrant
- Colias palaeno aias Fruhstorfer, 1903
- Colias palaeno sugitanii Esaki, 1929
- Eurema blanda arsakia (Fruhstorfer, [1910])
- Eurema brigitta hainana (Moore, 1878) vagrant
- Eurema hecabe hecabe (Linnaeus, 1758)
- Eurema laeta betheseba (Janson, 1878)
- Eurema mandarina mandarina (de l'Orza, 1869)
- Gonepteryx amintha formosana (Fruhstorfer, 1908) vagrant
- Gonepteryx aspasia niphonica Verity, 1909
- Gonepteryx maxima maxima Butler, 1885
- Hebomoia glaucippe liukiuensis Fruhstorfer, 1898
- Ixias pyrene insignis Butler, 1879 vagrant
- Leptidea amurensis amurensis (Ménétriès, 1858) Detail
- Leptidea amurensis vibilia (Janson, 1878)
- Leptidea morsei morsei (Fenton, [1882])
- Leptosia nina niobe (Wallace, 1866)
- Pieris brassicae brassicae (Linnaeus, 1758)
- Pieris canidia canidia (Sparrman, 1768)
- Pieris canidia kaolicola Bryk, 1946
- Pieris tomariana Matsumura, 1928
- Pieris melete Ménétriès, 1857
- Pieris nesis japonica Shirôzu, 1952
- Pieris nesis nesis Fruhstorfer, 1909
- Pieris rapae crucivora Boisduval, 1836
- Pontia edusa davendra Hemming, 1934 vagrant
- Talbotia naganum karumii (Ikeda, 1937) vagrant

== Lycaenidae ==
- Acytolepis puspa ishigakiana (Matsumura, 1929)
- Albulina optilete daisetsuzana (Matsumura, 1926)
- Antigius attilia attilia (Bremer, 1861)
- Antigius attilia yamanakashoji Fujioka, 1993
- Antigius butleri butleri(Fenton, [1882])
- Antigius butleri kurinodakensis Fujioka, 1975
- Araragi enthea enthea (Janson, 1877)
- Arhopala bazalus turbata (Butler, [1882])
- Arhopala ganesa loomisi (H. Pryer, 1886)
- Arhopala japonica (Murray, 1875)
- Arhopala rama (Kollar, [1844]) vagrant
- Artipe eryx okinawana (Matsumura, 1919)
- Artopoetes pryeri pryeri (Murray, 1873)
- Callophrys ferrea ferrea (Butler, 1866)
- Catochrysops panormus exiguus (Distant, 1886)
- Catochrysops strabo luzonensis Tite, 1959 vagrant
- Celastrina argiolus ladonides (de l'Orza, 1869)
- Celastrina lavendularis himilcon (Fruhstorfer, 1909) vagrant
- Celastrina ogasawaraensis (H. Pryer, 1883)
- Celastrina sugitanii ainonica Murayama, 1952
- Celastrina sugitanii kyushuensis Shirôzu, 1943
- Celastrina sugitanii sugitanii (Matsumura, 1919)
- Chrysozephyrus brillantinus (Staudinger, 1887)
- Chrysozephyrus hisamatsusanus hisamatsusanus (Nagami & Ishiga, 1935)
- Chrysozephyrus smaragdinus smaragdinus (Bremer, 1861)
- Coreana raphaelis (Oberthür, 1880)
- Curetis acuta paracuta de Nicéville, 1902
- Deudorix epijarbas epijarbas (Moore, [1858]) vagrant
- Euchrysops cnejus (Fabricius, 1798)
- Everes argiades argiades (Pallas, 1771)
- Everes lacturnus kawaii Matsumura, 1926
- Everes lacturnus lacturnus (Godart, [1824])
- Famegana alsulus (Herrich-Schäffer, 1869) vagrant
- Favonius cognatus latifasciatus Shirôzu & Hayashi, 1959
- Favonius jezoensis (Matsumura, 1915)
- Favonius orientalis (Murray, 1875)
- Favonius saphirinus saphirinus (Staudinger, 1887)
- Favonius taxila taxila (Bremer, 1861)
- Favonius ultramarinus ultramarinus (Fixsen, 1887)
- Favonius yuasai Shirôzu, 1947
- Fixsenia iyonis iyonis (Ota & Kusunoki, 1957)
- Fixsenia iyonis kibiensis (Shirôzu & M. Nanba, 1973)
- Fixsenia iyonis surugaensis (Fujioka, 1981)
- Fixsenia mera (Janson, 1877)
- Fixsenia pruni jezoensis (Matsumura, 1919)
- Fixsenia w-album fentoni (Butler, [1882])
- Freyeria putli (Kollar, [1844])
- Glaucopsyche lycormas lycormas (Butler, 1866)
- Glaucopsyche lycormas tomariana (Matsumura, 1928)
- Iratsume orsedice orsedice (Butler, [1882])
- Jamides alecto dromicus (Fruhstorfer, 1910)
- Jamides bochus formosanus Fruhstorfer, 1909
- Japonica lutea lutea (Hewitson, [1865])
- Japonica onoi mizobei Saigusa, 1993
- Japonica onoi onoi Murayama, 1953
- Japonica saepestriata gotohi Saigusa, 1993
- Japonica saepestriata saepestriata (Hewitson, [1865])
- Lampides boeticus (Linnaeus, 1767)
- Leptotes plinius (Fabricius, 1793) vagrant
- Luthrodes mindora (C. Felder & R. Felder, 1865) vagrant
- Luthrodes pandava (Horsfield, [1829])
- Lycaena phlaeas chinensis (C. Felder, 1862)
- Megisba malaya sikkima Moore, 1884
- Nacaduba kurava septentrionalis Shirôzu, 1953
- Neopithecops zalmora (Butler, [1870])
- Neozephyrus japonicus japonicus (Murray, 1875)
- Niphanda fusca fusca (Bremer & Grey, 1852)
- Nothodanis schaeffera schaeffera (Eschscholtz, 1821) vagrant
- Petrelaea tombugensis tombugensis (Röber, 1886) vagrant
- Phengaris arionides takamukui (Matsumura, 1919)
- Phengaris teleius daisensis (Matsumura, 1926)
- Phengaris teleius hosonoi (A. Takahashi, 1973)
- Phengaris teleius kazamoto (H. Druce, 1875)
- Phengaris teleius ogumae (Matsumura, 1910)
- Pithecops corvus ryukyuensis Shiôzu, 1964
- Pithecops fulgens tsushimanus Shirôzu & Urata, 1957
- Plebejus argus micrargus (Butler, 1878)
- Plebejus argus pseudaegon (Butler, [1882])
- Plebejus argyrognomon praeterinsularis Verity, 1921
- Plebejus subsolanus iburiensis (Butler, [1882])
- Plebejus subsolanus yaginus (Strand, 1922)
- Plebejus subsolanus yarigadakeanus (Matsumura, 1929)
- Prosotas nora formosana (Fruhstorfer, 1916)
- Pseudozizeeria maha argia (Ménétriès, 1857)
- Pseudozizeeria maha okinawana (Matsumura, 1929)
- Rapala arata (Bremer, 1861)
- Scolitantides orion jezoensis (Matsumura, 1919)
- Shijimia moorei moorei (Leech, 1889)
- Shijimiaeoides divina asonis (Matsumura, 1929)
- Shijimiaeoides divina barine (Leech, 1893)
- Shirozua jonasi jonasi (Janson, 1877)
- Sibataniozephyrus fujisanus fujisanus (Matsumura, 1910)
- Spalgis epius dilama (Moore, 1878) vagrant
- Spindasis takanonis takanonis (Matsumura, 1906)
- Taraka hamada hamada (H. Druce, 1875)
- Thermozephyrus ataxus kirishimaensis (Okajima, 1922)
- Thermozephyrus ataxus yakushimaensis (Yazaki, [1924])
- Tongeia fischeri japonica Fujioka, 1975
- Tongeia fischeri shirozui Hida, 2005
- Tongeia fischeri shojii Satonaka, 2003
- Udara albocaerulea albocaerulea (Moore, 1879)
- Udara dilecta dilecta (Moore, 1879) vagrant
- Ussuriana stygiana (Butler, 1881)
- Wagimo signatus (Butler, [1882])
- Zizeeria karsandra (Moore, 1865)
- Zizina emelina emelina (de l'Orza, 1869)
- Zizina otis riukuensis (Matsumura, 1929)
- Zizula hylax (Fabricius, 1775) vagrant

== Nymphalidae ==
- Aglais io geisha (Stichel, 1908)
- Aglais urticae connexa (Butler, [1882])
- Aglais urticae esakii Kurosawa & Fujioka, 1975
- Aglais urticae urticae (Linnaeus, 1758)
- Apatura metis substituta Butler, 1873
- Araschnia burejana burejana Bremer, 1861
- Araschnia levana obscura Fenton, [1882]
- Argynnis anadyomene ella Bremer, [1865]
- Argynnis childreni childreni Gray, 1831
- Argynnis hyperbius hyperbius (Linnaeus, 1763)
- Argynnis laodice japonica Ménétriès, 1857
- Argynnis paphia tsushimana Fruhstorfer, 1906
- Argynnis ruslana Motschulsky, 1866
- Argynnis sagana liane Fruhstorfer, 1907
- Ariadne ariadne pallidior (Fruhstorfer, 1899) vagrant
- Athyma fortuna kodahirai (Sonan, 1938) vagrant
- Athyma perius perius (Linnaeus, 1758)
- Athyma selenophora ishiana Fruhstorfer, 1899
- Boloria freija asahidakeana (Matsumura, 1926)
- Boloria iphigenia (Graeser, 1888)
- Boloria thore jezoensis (Matsumura, 1919)
- Brenthis daphne iwatensis (M. Okano, 1951)
- Brenthis daphne rabdia (Butler, 1877)
- Brenthis ino mashuensis (Kono, 1931)
- Brenthis ino tigroides (Fruhstorfer, 1907)
- Calinaga buddha formosana Fruhstorfer, 1908 vagrant
- Cirrochroa tyche C. Felder & R. Felder, 1861 vagrant
- Coenonympha hero latifasciata Matsumura, 1925
- Coenonympha hero neoperseis Fruhstorfer, 1908
- Coenonympha oedippus annulifer Butler, 1877
- Coenonympha oedippus arothius Okada & Torii, 1945
- Cupha erymanthis erymanthis (Drury, [1773])
- Cyrestis thyodamas mabella Fruhstorfer, 1898
- Danaus chrysippus chrysippus (Linnaeus, 1758)
- Danaus genutia genutia (Cramer, [1779])
- Danaus melanippus edmondii (Lesson, 1837) vagrant
- Danaus plexippus plexippus (Linnaeus, 1758) vagrant
- Dichorragia nesimachus ishigakiana Shirôzu, 1952
- Dichorragia nesimachus nesiotes Fruhstorfer, 1903
- Dichorragia nesimachus okinawaensis Shimagami, 1986
- Doleschallia bistaltide philippensis Fruhstorfer, 1899 vagrant
- Elymnias hypermnestra hainana Moore, 1878 vagrant
- Erebia ligea rishirizana Matsumura, 1928
- Erebia ligea takanonis Matsumura, 1909
- Erebia niphonica Janson, 1877
- Euploea camaralzeman cratis Butler, 1866 vagrant
- Euploea core godartii Lucas, 1853 vagrant
- Euploea eunice eunice (Godart, 1819) vagrant
- Euploea eunice hobsoni (Butler, [1878]) vagrant
- Euploea klugii erichsonii C. Felder & R. Felder, [1865] vagrant
- Euploea midamus midamus (Linnaeus, 1758) vagrant
- Euploea mulciber barsine Fruhstorfer, 1904
- Euploea radamanthus radamanthus (Fabricius, 1793) vagrant
- Euploea swainson swainson (Godart, [1824]) vagrant
- Euploea sylvester laetifica Butler, 1866 vagrant
- Euploea tulliolus koxinga Fruhstorfer, 1908 vagrant
- Euploea tulliolus polita Erichson, 1834 vagrant
- Fabriciana adippe pallescens (Butler, 1873)
- Fabriciana nerippe (C. Felder & R. Felder, 1862)
- Hestina assimilis assimilis (Linnaeus, 1758) exotic
- Hestina assimilis shirakii Shirôzu, 1955
- Hestina japonica (C. Felder & R. Felder, 1862)
- Hestina persimilis tsushimana Fujioka, 1981
- Hypolimnas anomala anomala (Wallace, 1869) vagrant
- Hypolimnas bolina bolina (Linnaeus, 1758) vagrant
- Hypolimnas bolina jacintha (Drury, 1773) vagrant
- Hypolimnas bolina kezia (Butler, [1878]) vagrant
- Hypolimnas bolina philippensis (Butler, 1874) vagrant
- Hypolimnas bolina rarik (Eschscholtz, 1821) vagrant
- Hypolimnas misippus (Linnaeus, 1764) vagrant
- Idea leuconoe clara (Butler, 1867)
- Idea leuconoe riukiuensis (Holland, 1893)
- Ideopsis juventa manillana (Moore, 1883) vagrant
- Ideopsis similis similis (Linnaeus, 1758)
- Junonia almana almana (Linnaeus, 1758)
- Junonia atlites atlites (Linnaeus, 1763) vagrant
- Junonia hedonia ida (Cramer, 1775) vagrant
- Junonia hierta (Fabricius, 1798) vagrant
- Junonia iphita iphita (Cramer, [1779]) vagrant
- Junonia lemonias lemonias (Linnaeus, 1758) vagrant
- Junonia orithya orithya (Linnaeus, 1758)
- Kallima inachus eucerca Fruhstorfer, 1898
- Kaniska canace ishima (Fruhstorfer, [1899])
- Kaniska canace nojaponicum (von Siebold, 1824)
- Kirinia fentoni (Butler, 1877)
- Lasiommata deidamia deidamia (Eversmann, 1851)
- Lasiommata deidamia interrupta (Fruhstorfer, 1909)
- Lasiommata deidamia kampuzana Y. Yazaki, 1981
- Lethe diana diana (Butler, 1866)
- Lethe diana mikuraensis Shirôzu, 1975
- Lethe europa pavida Fruhstorfer, 1908
- Lethe marginalis (Motschulsky, [1861])
- Lethe sicelis (Hewitson, [1862])
- Libythea geoffroy philippina Staudinger, 1889 vagrant
- Libythea lepita amamiana Shirôzu, 1956
- Libythea lepita celtoides Fruhstorfer, [1909]
- Libythea lepita formosana Fruhstorfer, 1908
- Libythea narina luzonica Moore, [1901] vagrant
- Limenitis camilla japonica Ménétriès, 1857
- Limenitis glorifica Fruhstorfer, 1909
- Limenitis populi jezoensis Matsumura, 1919
- Lopinga achine achinoides (Butler, 1878)
- Lopinga achine jezoensis (Matsumura, 1919)
- Lopinga achine oniwakiensis Y. Yazaki & Hiramoto, 1981
- Melanargia epimede Staudinger, 1892 vagrant
- Melanitis boisduvalia boisduvalia (C. Felder & R. Felder, 1863) vagrant
- Melanitis leda leda (Linnaeus, 1758)
- Melanitis phedima oitensis Matsumura, 1919
- Melitaea ambigua niphona (Butler, 1878)
- Melitaea protomedia Ménétriès, 1858
- Melitaea scotosia Butler, 1878
- Minois dryas bipunctata (Motschulsky, 1860)
- Mycalesis francisca perdiccas Hewitson, [1862]
- Mycalesis gotama fulginia Fruhstorfer, [1911]
- Mycalesis madjicosa amamiana Fujioka, 1975
- Mycalesis madjicosa madjicosa Butler, 1868
- Mycalesis perseus (Fabricius, 1775) vagrant
- Neope goschkevitschii (Ménétriès, 1857)
- Neope niphonica kiyosumiensis M. Takáhashi & Aoyama, 1981
- Neope niphonica marumoi Esaki & Umeno, 1929
- Neope niphonica niphonica Butler, 1881
- Neptis alwina (Bremer & Grey, 1852)
- Neptis hylas luculenta Fruhstorfer, 1907
- Neptis philyra philyra Ménétriès, 1858
- Neptis pryeri hamadai Fujioka, Minotani & Fukuda, 1999
- Neptis pryeri iwasei Fujioka, 1998
- Neptis pryeri kitakamiensis Fukuda, Minotani & Iwano, 2000
- Neptis pryeri yodoei Fujioka, 1998
- Neptis rivularis bergmanni Bryk, 1942
- Neptis rivularis insularum Fruhstorfer, 1907
- Neptis rivularis shirozui M. Okano, 1954
- Neptis rivularis tadamiensis Higuma, 1961
- Neptis sappho intermedia W. B. Pryer, 1877
- Neptis sappho yessonensis Fruhstorfer, [1913]
- Ninguta schrenckii schrenckii (Ménétriès, 1858)
- Nymphalis antiopa (Linnaeus, 1758)
- Nymphalis vaualbum ([Denis & Schiffermüller], 1775)
- Nymphalis xanthomelas japonica (Stichel, 1902)
- Oeneis melissa daisetsuzana Matsumura, 1926
- Oeneis norna asamana Matsumura, 1919
- Oeneis norna sugitanii Shirôzu, 1952
- Parantica aglea maghaba (Fruhstorfer, 1909)
- Parantica luzonensis luzonensis (C. Felder & R. Felder, 1863) vagrant
- Parantica sita niphonica (Moore, 1883)
- Parantica swinhoei (Moore, 1883) vagrant
- Parantica vitrina vitrina (C. Felder & R. Felder, 1861) vagrant
- Parthenos sylla philippensis Fruhstorfer, 1898 vagrant
- Phalanta alcippe (Stoll, [1782]) vagrant
- Phalanta phalantha (Drury, [1773]) vagrant
- Polygonia c-album hamigera (Butler, 1877)
- Polygonia c-aureum c-aureum (Linnaeus, 1758)
- Polyura eudamippus weismanni (Fritze, 1894)
- Polyura narcaea (Hewitson, [1854]) exotic
- Sasakia charonda charonda (Hewitson, [1863])
- Speyeria aglaja basalis (Matsumura, 1908)
- Speyeria aglaja fortuna (Janson, 1877)
- Symbrenthia lilaea lunica M.J. Bascombe, Johnston & F.S. Bascombe, 1999 vagrant
- Tirumala hamata orientalis (Semper, 1879) vagrant
- Tirumala ishmoides sontinus (Fruhstorfer, 1911) vagrant
- Tirumala limniace limniace (Cramer, [1775]) vagrant
- Tirumala limniace orestilla (Fruhstorfer, [1910]) vagrant
- Tirumala septentrionis septentrionis (Butler, 1874) vagrant
- Vanessa cardui (Linnaeus, 1758)
- Vanessa indica indica (Herbst, 1794)
- Yoma sabina podium Tsukada, 1985 vagrant
- Ypthima argus argus Butler, 1866
- Ypthima masakii Ito, 1947
- Ypthima multistriata ganus Fruhstorfer, [1911]
- Ypthima multistriata niphonica Murayama, 1969
- Ypthima riukiuana Matsumura, 1906
- Ypthima yayeyamana Nire, 1920
- Zophoessa callipteris (Butler, 1877)

== See also ==
- List of moths of Japan
- Wildlife Protection Areas in Japan
- List of national parks of Japan

== Important literature ==
- Adalbert Seitz Die Gross-Schmetterlinge der Erde Abt. 1, Die Großschmetterlinge des palaearktischen Faunengebietes, Die palaearktischen Tagfalter, 1909, 379 Seiten, mit 89 kolorierten Tafeln (3470 Figuren) online text, online plates
- Fujioka, T., 1975. Butterflies of Japan [1]. 312pp., 137 pls.. Kôdansha, Tokyo (in Japanese)
- John Henry Leech, 1892-1893. Butterflies from China, Japan and Corea 1: 54 + 297 pp.; 2: 297-681, 1 map; 43 pls. London.
- Yokoyama, M. & Wakabayashi, M., 1970. Coloured Illustrations of the Butterflies of Japan Hoikusha Publishing Co. Ltd, Osaka.178pp, 74 pls
- Kawazoé, A. & Wakabayashi, M., 1979. Coloured Illustrations of the Butterflies of Japan. Edn. 2. Osaka, Hoikusha: vii+422 pp, 72 pls, 80 figs.
- Shonen Matsumura,1904- Nihon senchu zukai or Thousand insects of Japan Tokyo :[Keiseisha?], Meiji 37-40 [1904-1907] online (four volumes)
- Bernard d'Abrera, 1991-1993 Butterflies of the Holarctic Region, 3 Parts (pt. 1. Papilionidae, Pieridae, Danaidae & Satyridae (partim) -pt. 2. Satyridae (concl.) & Nymphalidae (partim) -pt. 3. Nymphalidae (concl.), Libytheidae, Riodinidae & Lycaenidae., Hill House, Victoria ISBN 0646062557
- P. A. Ler Ed. 2001 Key to the insects of the Far East of Russia, Vol. 5, Part 3: Trichoptera and Lepidoptera Dal'nauka, Vladivostok ISBN 5804400924
- Shibatani, A. and S. Ito, 1942. Beitrag zur systematik der Theclinae im kaiserreich Japan unter besonderer berucksichtigung der sogenannten gattung Zephyrus (Lepidoptera: Lycaenidae). Nature Life (Kyungpook J. bio. Sci.) 15: 33-46, figs.
- Pryer, H. J. S., 1886. Rhopalocera Nihonica: a description of the butterflies of Japan, Ed. 1: 12 pp, 3 pls; Ed 2: xiii +35pp, 10pls
- Igarashi, S. and H. Fukuda. 1997- . The life histories of Asian butterflies Tokai University Press, Tokyo.
- S Ishikawa, 1994 Cho (Butterflies) Living in Japan Maruzen Company Ltd ISBN 4892427225
- Motomu Teshirogi, 1997 An Illustrated Book of the Japanese Nymphalidae Tōkyō: Tōkai Daigaku Shuppankai (Tokyo University Press) ISBN 4486010973
- Motomu Teshirogi, 1997 An Illustrated Book of the Japanese Lycaenidae Tōkyō: Tōkai Daigaku Shuppankai. ISBN 9784486014058
- Toshio Inomata Ed. Colour photographs by Katsuji Iwao. 1986.Atlas of the Japanese Butterflies Take Shobo Co. Ltd., 7-3, lidabashi 2, Chiyoda, Tokyo, 102 Japan.500 pp., numerous text figs., 86 color plates.
- Taro Iwase, 1954 Synopsis of the known life-histories of Japanese butterflies The Lepidopterists' News 1954: 95-100 pdf

Papers by Shonen Matsumura, Alfred Ernest Wileman, Atuhiro Sibatani, Siuiti Murayama, Takashi Shirôzu, Richard Paget Murray, Oliver Erichson Janson in Tyô to Ga Series website (open access)

History

- Wilhem de Haan 1833- with Japanese artist naturalists Keiga Kawahara Kurimoto Masayoshi and others.Fauna Japonica sive Descriptio animalium, quae in itinere per Japoniam, jussu et auspiciis superiorum, qui summum in India Batava imperium tenent, suscepto, annis 1825 - 1830 collegit, notis, observationibus et adumbrationibus illustravit Ph. Fr. de Siebold. Conjunctis studiis C. J. Temminck et H. Schlegel pro vertebratis atque W. de Haan pro invertebratis elaborata (Fauna Japonica in five serial volumes published between 1833 and 1850)
- Henry John Elwes, 1881 On the Butterflies of Amurland, North China, and Japan Proceedings of the Zoological Society of London 1881: 856-917
- Ueno, M., 1987. A history of Japanese Zoology (in Japanese). 531pp. Yasakashobo, Tokyo.
