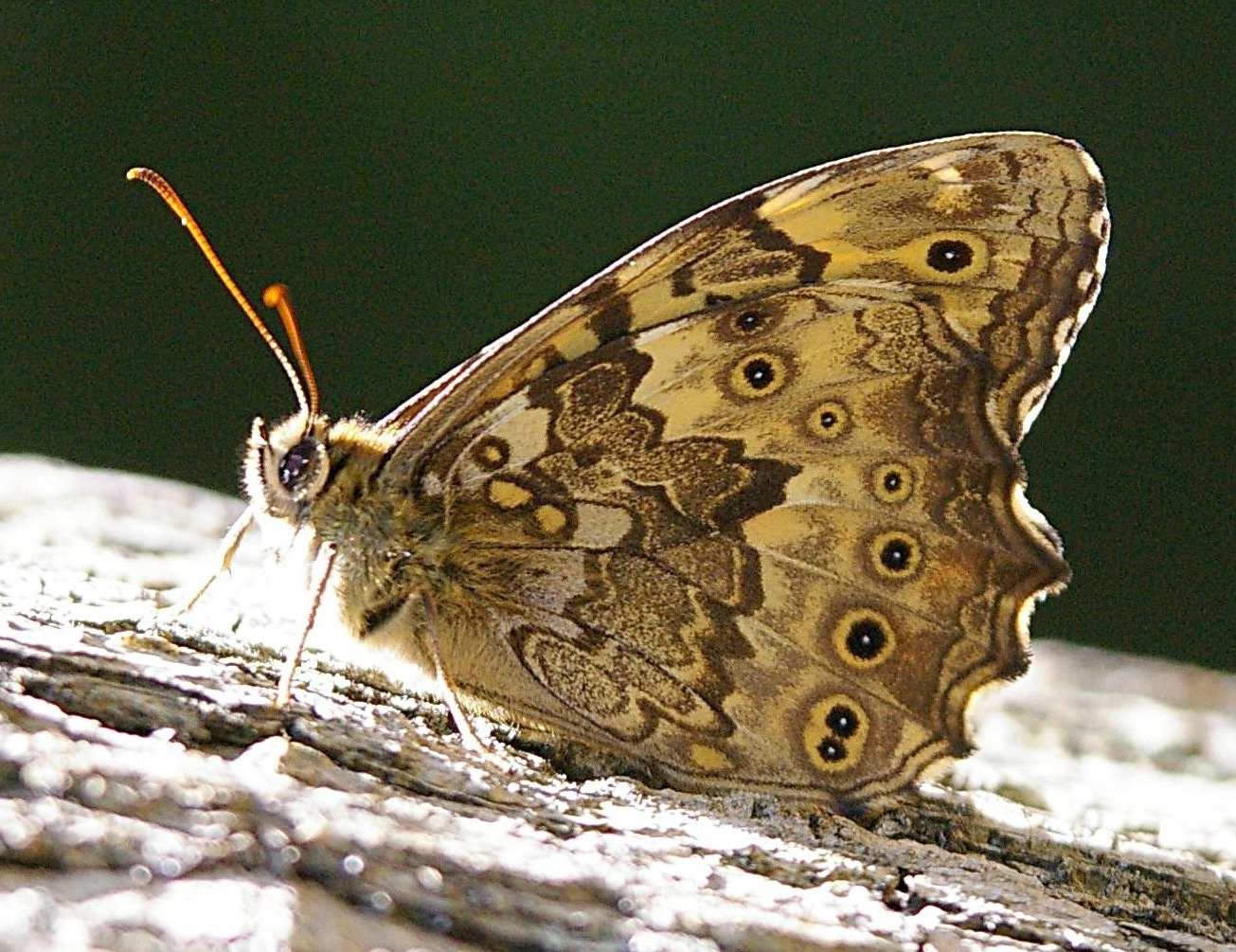

Scientific classification
- Kingdom: Animalia
- Phylum: Arthropoda
- Class: Insecta
- Order: Lepidoptera
- Family: Nymphalidae
- Genus: Neope
- Species: N. goschkevitschii

Binomial name
- Neope goschkevitschii (Menetries, 1857)

Synonyms
- Lasiommata goschkevitschii Ménétriés, 1857

= Neope goschkevitschii =

Species of butterfly

Neope goschkevitschii is a Nymphalidae butterfly found in East Asia. This species looks quite similar to Neope niphonica and these two species were treated as one for a long time.

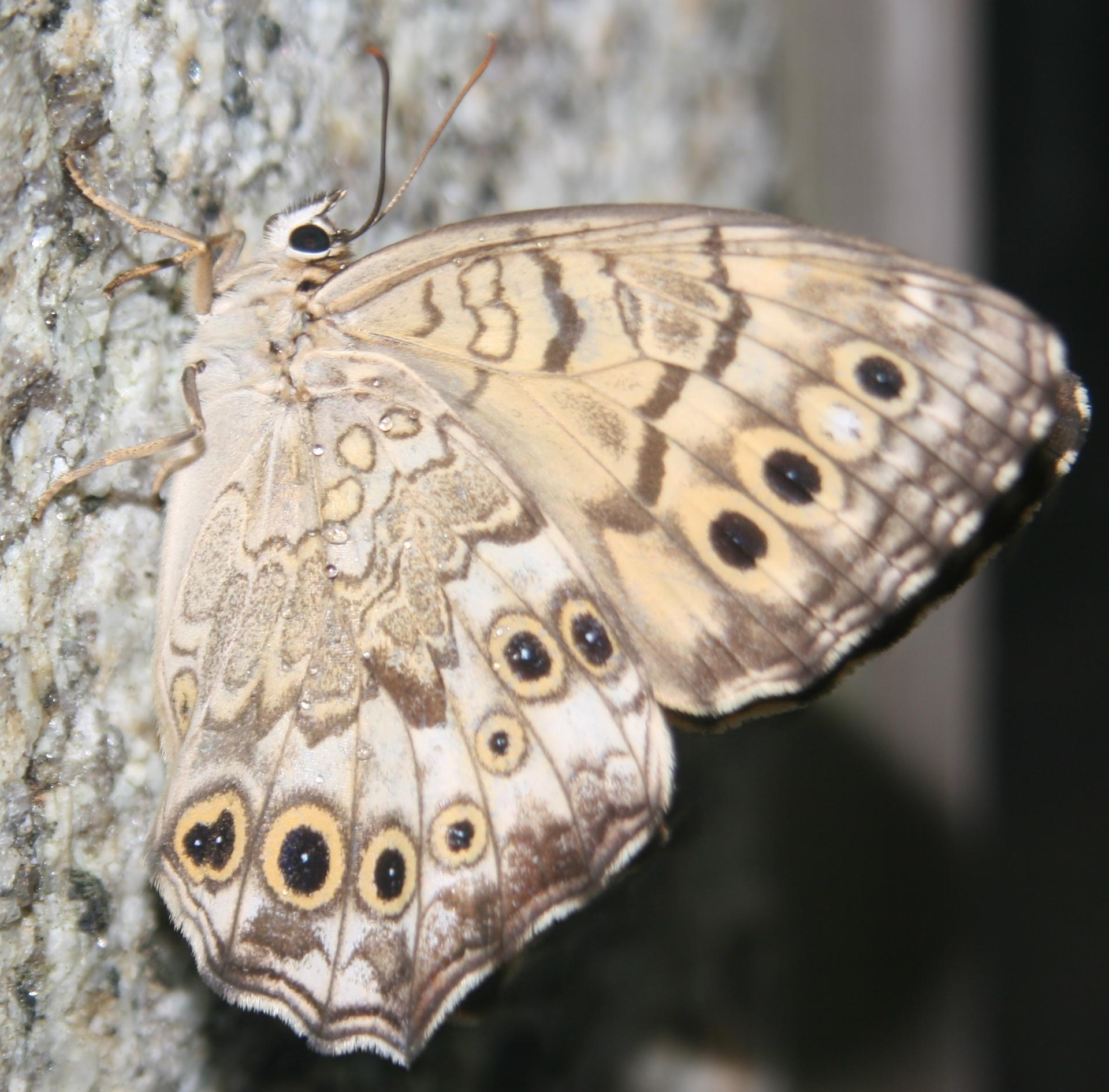
Neope niphonica in Japan
