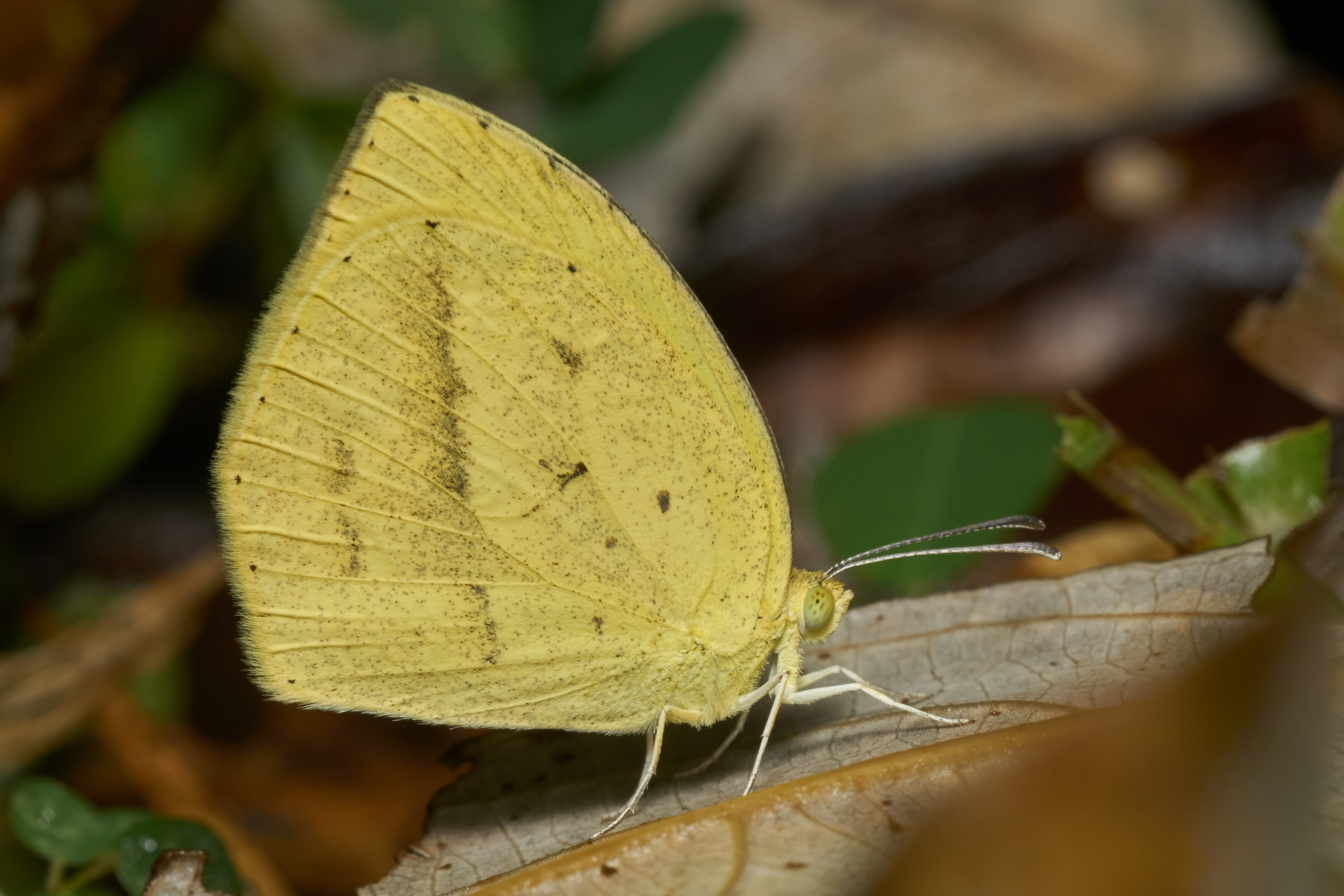

Scientific classification
- Kingdom: Animalia
- Phylum: Arthropoda
- Class: Insecta
- Order: Lepidoptera
- Family: Pieridae
- Genus: Eurema
- Species: E. laeta

Binomial name
- Eurema laeta Boisduval, 1836

Synonyms
- Terias venata Moore, 1857

= Eurema laeta =

Spotless grass yellow

Species of butterfly

Eurema laeta, the more commonly known spotless grass yellow, is a small butterfly of the family Pieridae (the yellows and whites), which is found in India, Sri Lanka, China, Indochina, Japan, and onwards to Australia.

== Description ==
Wet form: Male. Upper-side pale yellow, basal areas slightly irrorated with grey-black scales. Fore-wing with a broad vinescent-black outer marginal band, which curves from middle of the costa to upper median, below which it is sinuated to lower median, its posterior end being deeply excavated to the angle. Hind-wing with a distinctly defined black slender complete band; and a salmon-coloured patch of matted scales between the costal and sub-costal vein. Underside paler yellow, unmarked, except that a very faint indication of marginal dots and a small upper discocellular streak on both wings, and a dot above the cell and discal transverse streaks on hind-wing. Fore-wing with a sub-basal oval patch of compactly matted salmon-coloured scales, which extend below and partly above the basal portion of the median vein. Female. Upper-side paler yellow. Fore-wing with the outer band somewhat broader. Hind-wing with the band broader anteriorly and complete; no costal patch. Underside as in male. No sub-basal patch of salmon-coloured scales.

Dry form: Male. Upper-side. Fore-wing with the band similar to the wet form, its posterior end more excavated. Underside with the ordinary markings more apparent. Female. Upper-side. Fore-wing with the posterior end of the band obsolescent. Hind-wing with the band posteriorly narrower and more or less broken. Underside as in the male.

— Charles Swinhoe, Lepidoptera Indica. Vol. VII

== Photo gallery ==
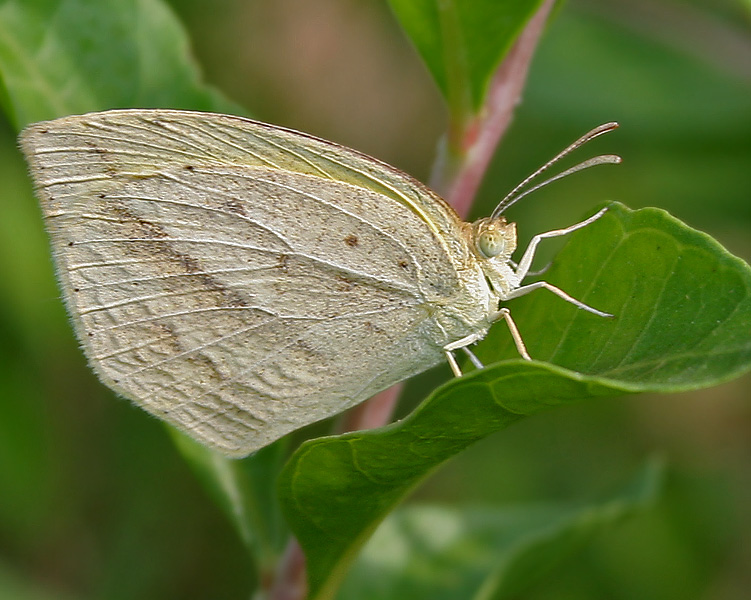
In Hyderabad, India

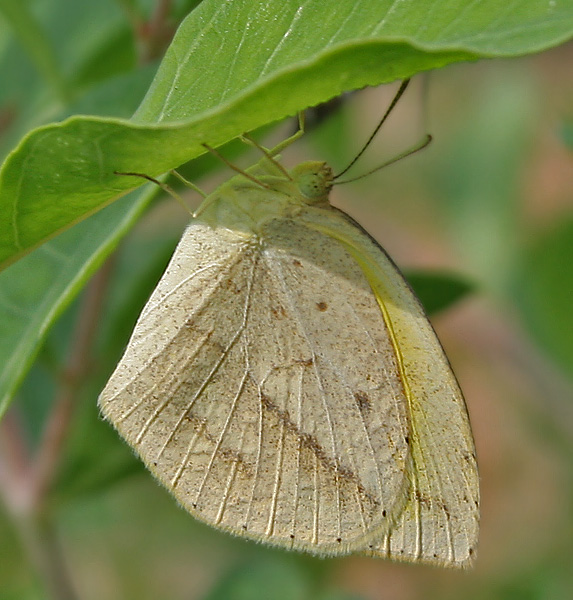
In Hyderabad, India

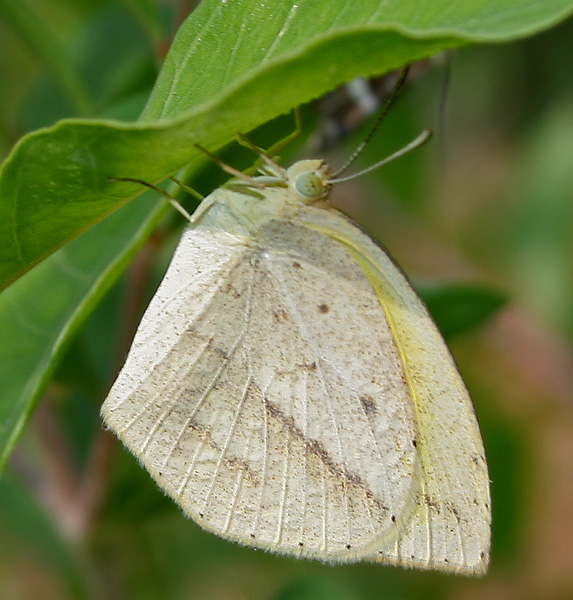
In Hyderabad, India

In Tokyo, Japan

== See also ==
- List of butterflies of India
- List of butterflies of India (Pieridae)
- List of butterflies of Japan
