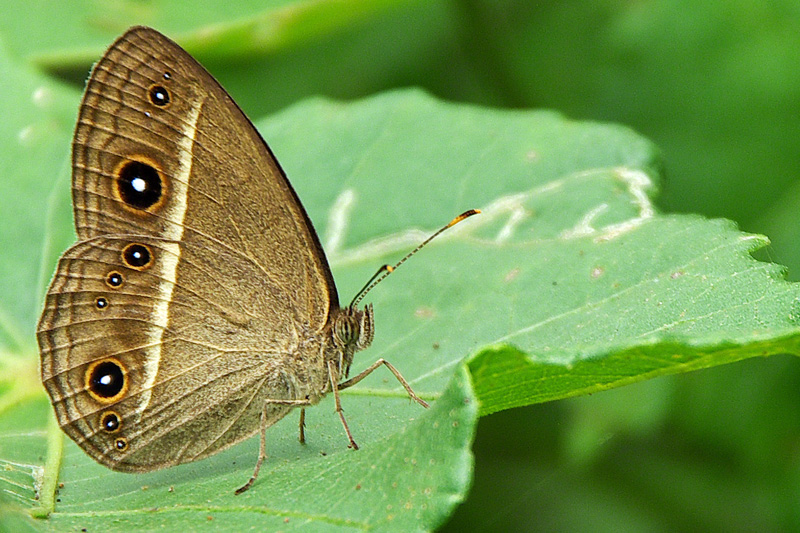

Scientific classification
- Domain: Eukaryota
- Kingdom: Animalia
- Phylum: Arthropoda
- Class: Insecta
- Order: Lepidoptera
- Family: Nymphalidae
- Genus: Mycalesis
- Species: M. madjicosa

Binomial name
- Mycalesis madjicosa Butler, 1868

= Mycalesis madjicosa =

Species of butterfly

Mycalesis madjicosa is a satyrine butterfly endemic to Japan. The larva feeds on Imperata and Cortaderia selloana.

== Subspecies ==
- M. m. madjicosa
- M. m. amamiana Fujioka, 1975 (Amami, Okinawa)
