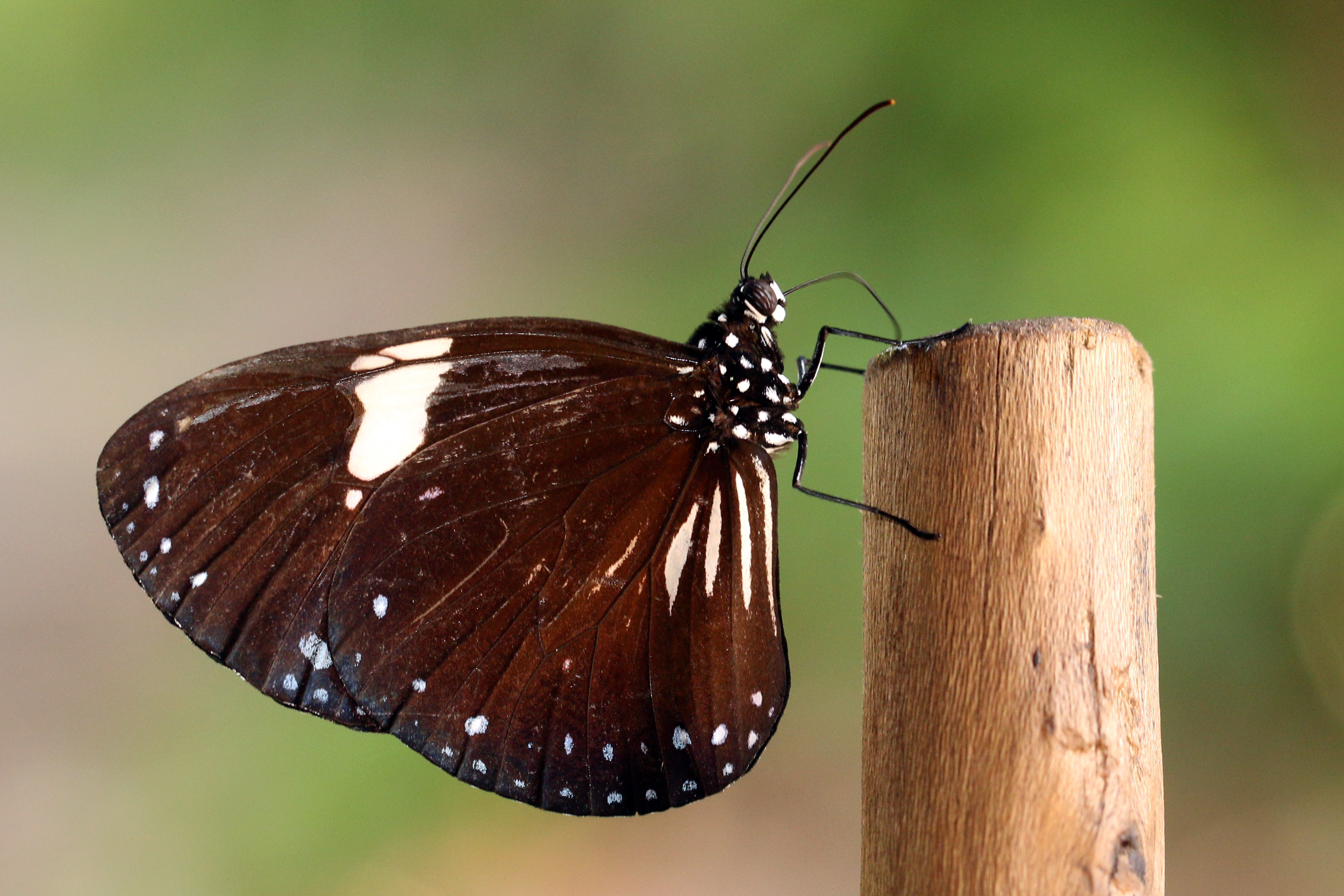
- E. r. lowei Sabah, Borneo, Malaysia

Scientific classification
- Kingdom: Animalia
- Phylum: Arthropoda
- Clade: Pancrustacea
- Class: Insecta
- Order: Lepidoptera
- Family: Nymphalidae
- Genus: Euploea
- Species: E. radamanthus

Binomial name
- Euploea radamanthus (Fabricius, 1793)

Synonyms
- Papilio radamanthus Fabricius, 1793

= Euploea radamanthus =

Magpie crow

Species of butterfly

Euploea radamanthus, the magpie crow, is a butterfly found in India and Southeast Asia that belongs to the danaid group of the brush-footed butterflies family. Euploea radamanthus is found in the Eastern Himalayas and into the Malay region.

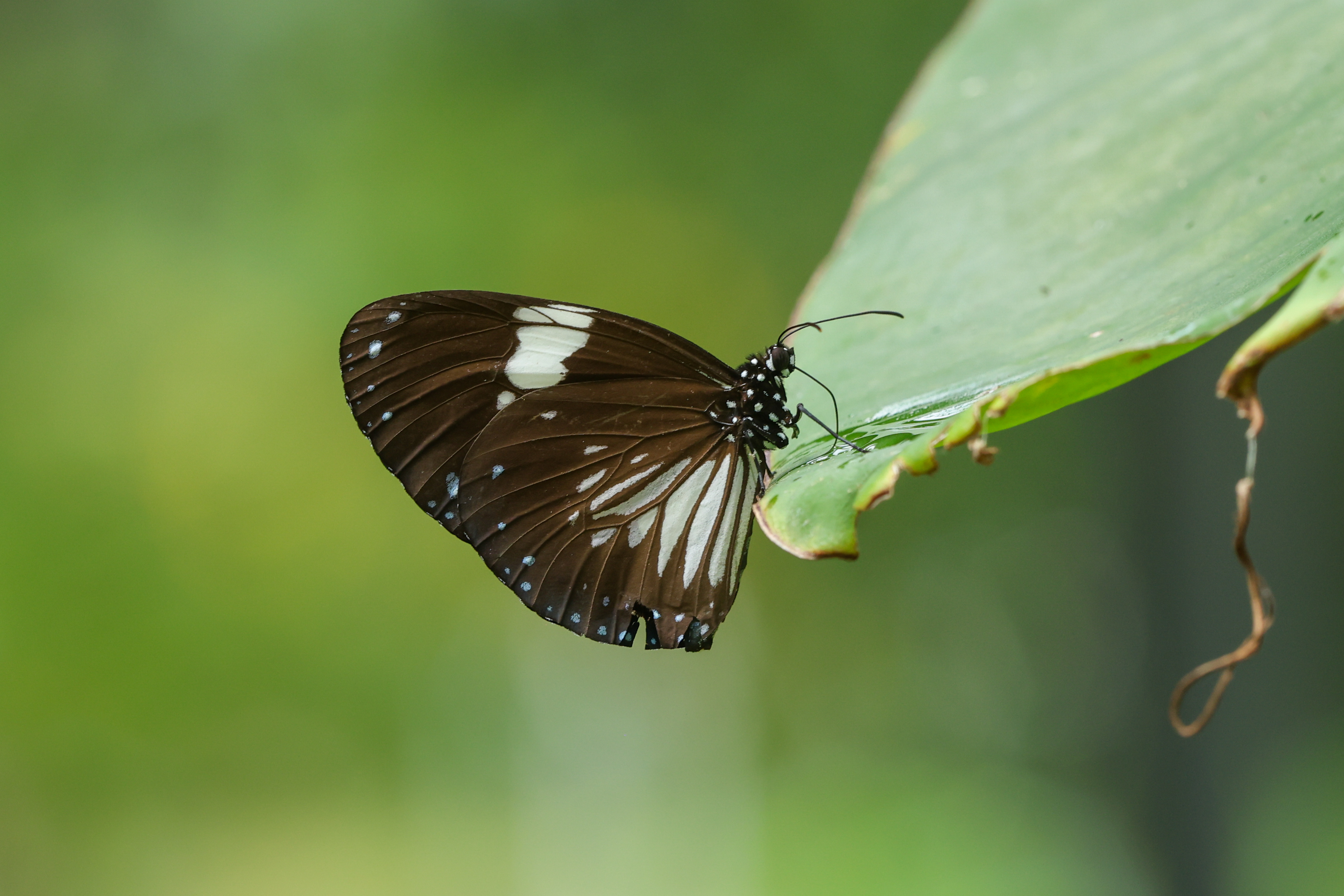
From Laos

== Subspecies ==
There are several subspecies of this butterfly:

- Euploea radamanthus subsp. aerithus Fruhstorfer, 1910
- Euploea radamanthus subsp. alcidice (Godart, 1819)
- Euploea radamanthus subsp. despoliata Fruhstorfer, 1910
- Euploea radamanthus subsp. lowii (Butler, 1878)
- Euploea radamanthus subsp. radamanthus
- Euploea radamanthus subsp. ramsayi (Moore, 1890)
- Euploea radamanthus subsp. schildi Fruhstorfer, 1910
- Euploea radamanthus subsp. schreiberi (Butler, 1884)
- Euploea radamanthus subsp. talboti Tytler, 1939

== See also ==
- List of butterflies of India
- List of butterflies of India (Nymphalidae)
