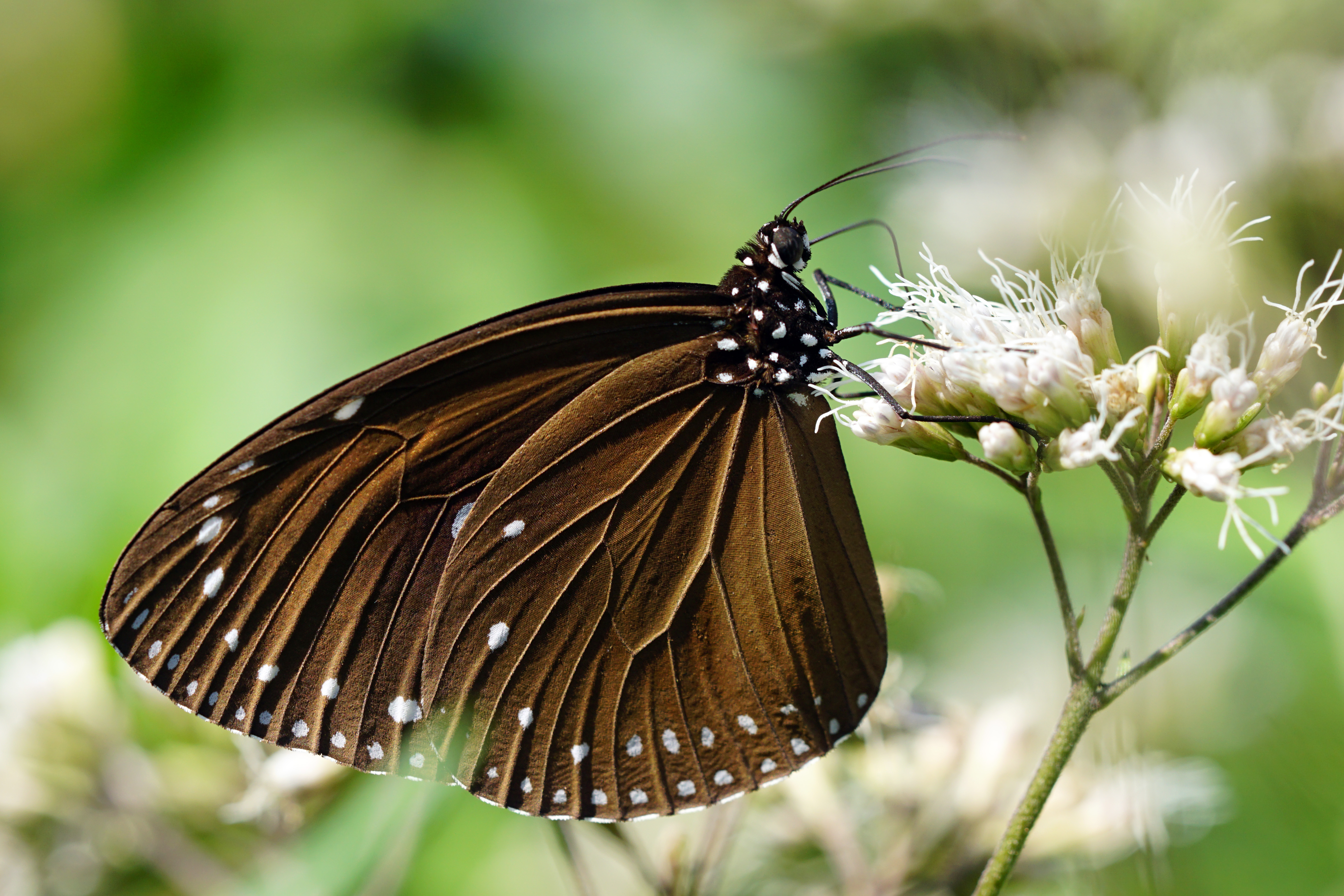
- E. t. koxinga underside
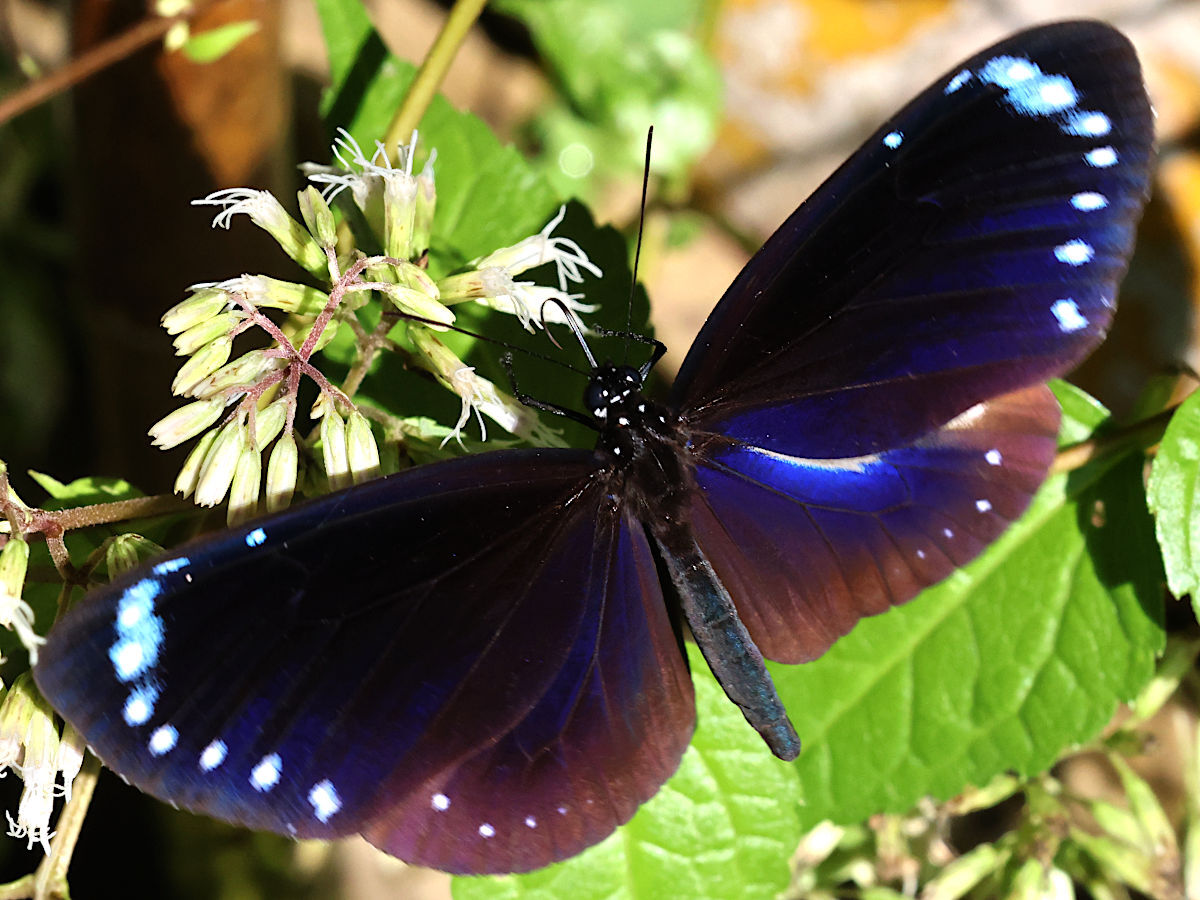
- E. t. koxinga upperside

Scientific classification
- Kingdom: Animalia
- Phylum: Arthropoda
- Clade: Pancrustacea
- Class: Insecta
- Order: Lepidoptera
- Family: Nymphalidae
- Genus: Euploea
- Species: E. tulliolus

Binomial name
- Euploea tulliolus Fabricius, 1793

Synonyms
- Euploea inquinata (Butler, 1866)

= Euploea tulliolus =

Dwarf crow

Species of butterfly

Euploea tulliolus, the dwarf crow or small brown crow, is a butterfly found in the Solomon Islands, Malaysia, Taiwan, Vietnam, Singapore and Australia, that belongs to the crows and tigers, that is, the danaid group of the brush-footed butterflies family. It has a wingspan of about 4 to 8 centimeters.

Due to the purple iridescence of the butterfly under sunlight, the butterfly is also commonly referred to as the purple crow.

The Taiwanese population (subspecies E. t. koxinga) engages in a mass migration from the north of Taiwan to the south and back again. During the migration the main highway blocking their route has protective netting put in place and butterfly numbers are tracked with traffic restricted during the peak of the swarm's crossing.
