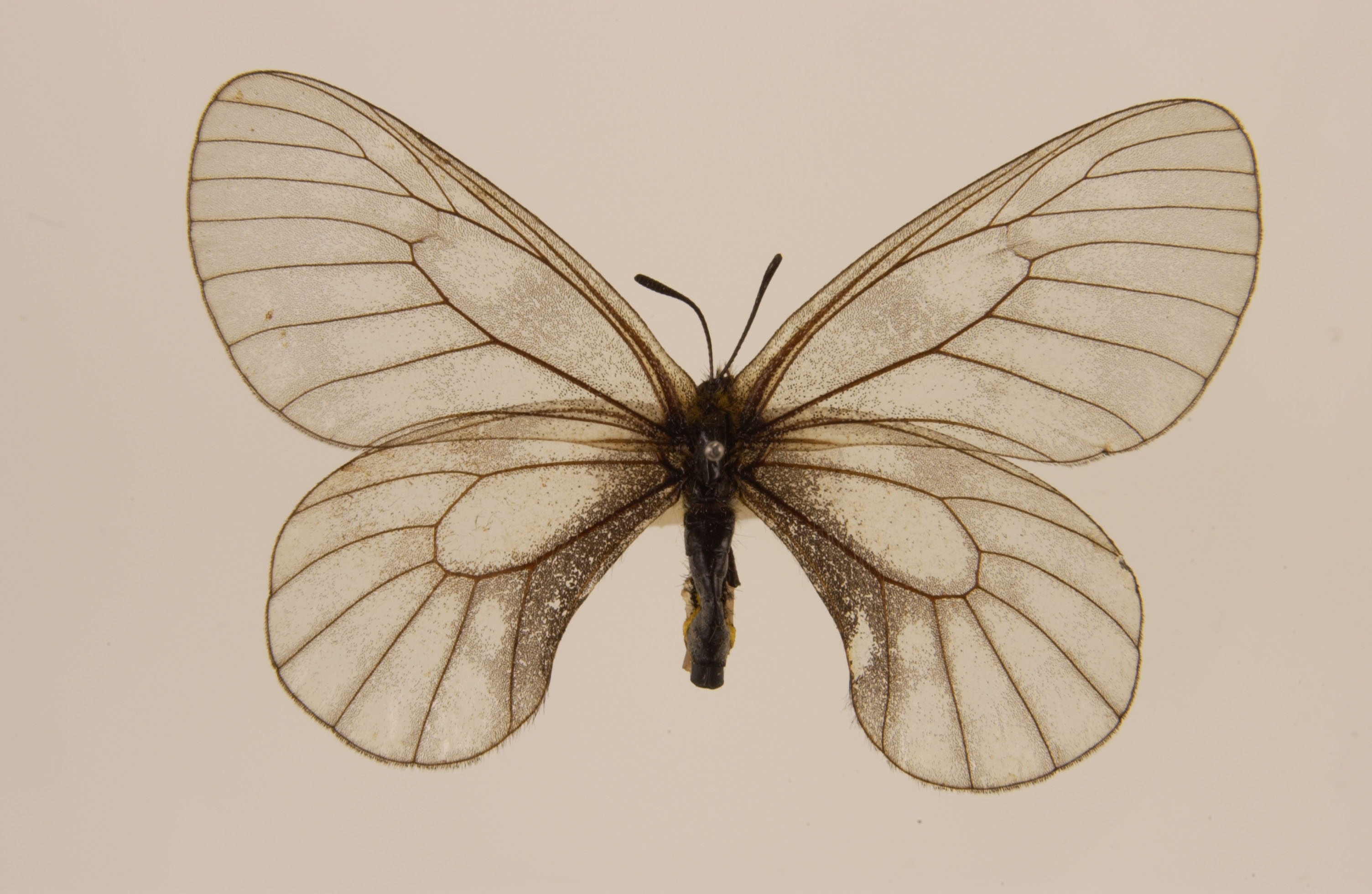

Scientific classification
- Domain: Eukaryota
- Kingdom: Animalia
- Phylum: Arthropoda
- Class: Insecta
- Order: Lepidoptera
- Family: Papilionidae
- Genus: Parnassius
- Species: P. stubbendorfi

Binomial name
- Parnassius stubbendorfi Ménétries, 1849

= Parnassius stubbendorfi =

Species of butterfly

Parnassius stubbendorfi is a high-altitude butterfly found in from the Altai Mountains across central, south, and far east Siberia (Tuva, Buryat, Chita, Amur, Khabarovsk and Primorye), Sakhalin and the Kuril Islands and from Mongolia across north China (Heilungkiang, Kansu, Szechwan and Tsinghai) to west Korea and Japan (Hokkaido). It is a member of the snow Apollo genus (Parnassius) of the swallowtail family (Papilionidae).

== Description ==
Dull white, the veins being black, forewing narrowly grey at the costal edge, rather more broadly transparent - grey at the apex and distal margin; near the apex a more or less distinct dark grey shadow - transverse band; two grey spots in the cell, which are sometimes absent. Hindwing almost without pattern, only the abdominal border being somewhat dusted with black; on the underside sometimes some yellow hairs at the abdominal margin. Pouch of female sphragis whitish, similar to that of mnemosyne. Antenna, legs and fringes of wings black. There occur singly specimens of the female sex which are, as in the previous species, darkened all over, being grey or blackish: ab. melanophia Honr. The markings of this aberration are indistinct or absent, not being visible on the dark ground, and the abdomen is thinly covered with yellowish hairs. In the female of Parnassius stubbendorfi tartarus Austaut, 1895 the grey markings are intensified, the cell-spots are more distinct and connected with one another and with the costal spot situated beyond the apex of the cell by a grey dusting along the sides of the cell. Submarginal band of forewing more distinctly marked, on both wings along both sides of the veins a more or less abundant dusting of blackish scaling; generally a grey spot at the costal margin of hindwing. Kuku-nor, Sining, Kashmir. — Larva conspicuously different from that of all other Parnassii, being similar to a large Agrotis caterpillar, black with pale yellow oblique side stripes, after the last moult light red-brown, with two pale yellow longitudinal stripes bearing black spots, there being moreover black dashes, lines, arrowhead-shaped spots and other black markings on the back. The under surface and sides as far as the yellow stripes greyish brown, the former with numerous pale dots. Head and thoracical legs black. The whole body short-hairy; reversible fork whitish yellow, almost transparent; in May and June on Corydalis species, especially C. gigantea, concealed in day time. Pupa in a rather strongly built cocoon, which lies underneath old pieces of wood, stones etc. (Graeser). In the Altai Mts., Amurland, Ussuri (Eastern Asiatic coast-provinces).

== Biology ==
The butterfly prefers open habitats in the taiga belt; in the mountains up to the subalpine zone (1,000–2,000 m) The flight period is from May and June (June and July at high altitudes). Larvae feed on Corydalis species, including C. gigantea and C. ambigua.

== Identification ==
The Parnassius species of butterflies are often hard to identify and can sometimes only be identified by dissection of the genitalia. P.R. Ackery (1975) provides a key available online.

== Type locality ==
The type locality is “Kansk environs near Khorma river”.
