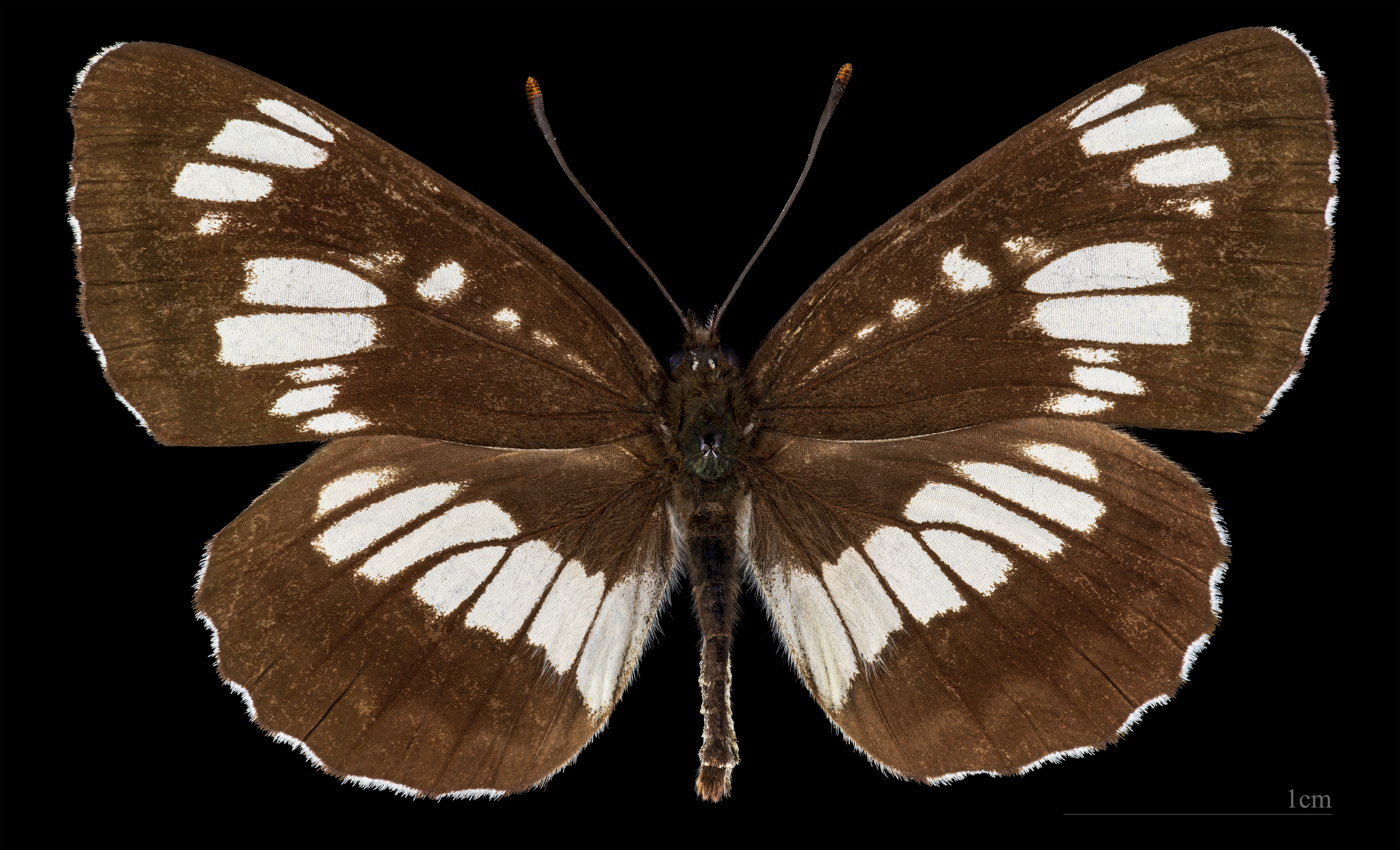
- Neptis rivularis ♂
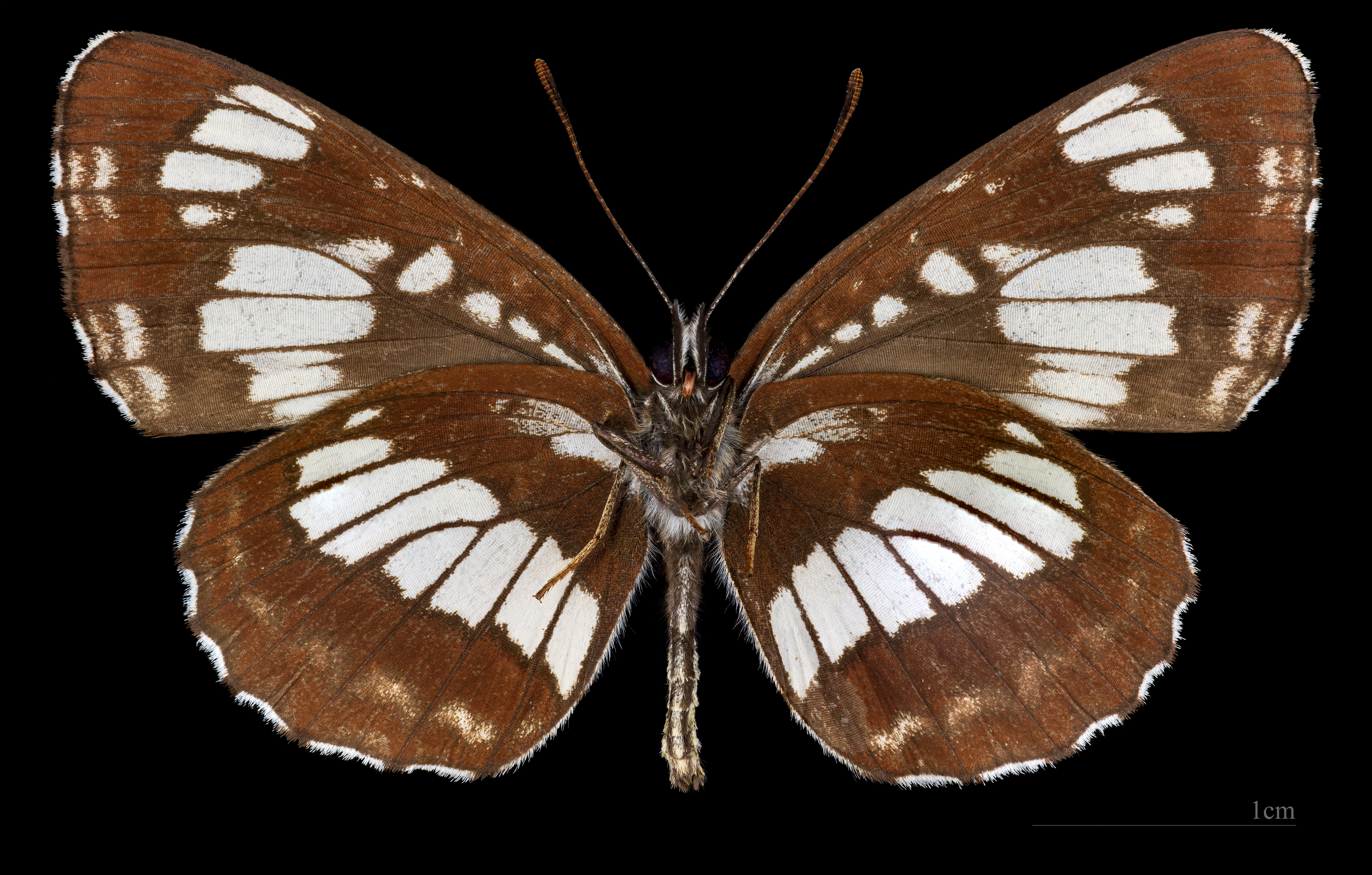
- Neptis rivularis ♂ △

Scientific classification
- Kingdom: Animalia
- Phylum: Arthropoda
- Class: Insecta
- Order: Lepidoptera
- Family: Nymphalidae
- Genus: Neptis
- Species: N. rivularis

Binomial name
- Neptis rivularis (Scopoli, 1763)

= Neptis rivularis =

Species of butterfly

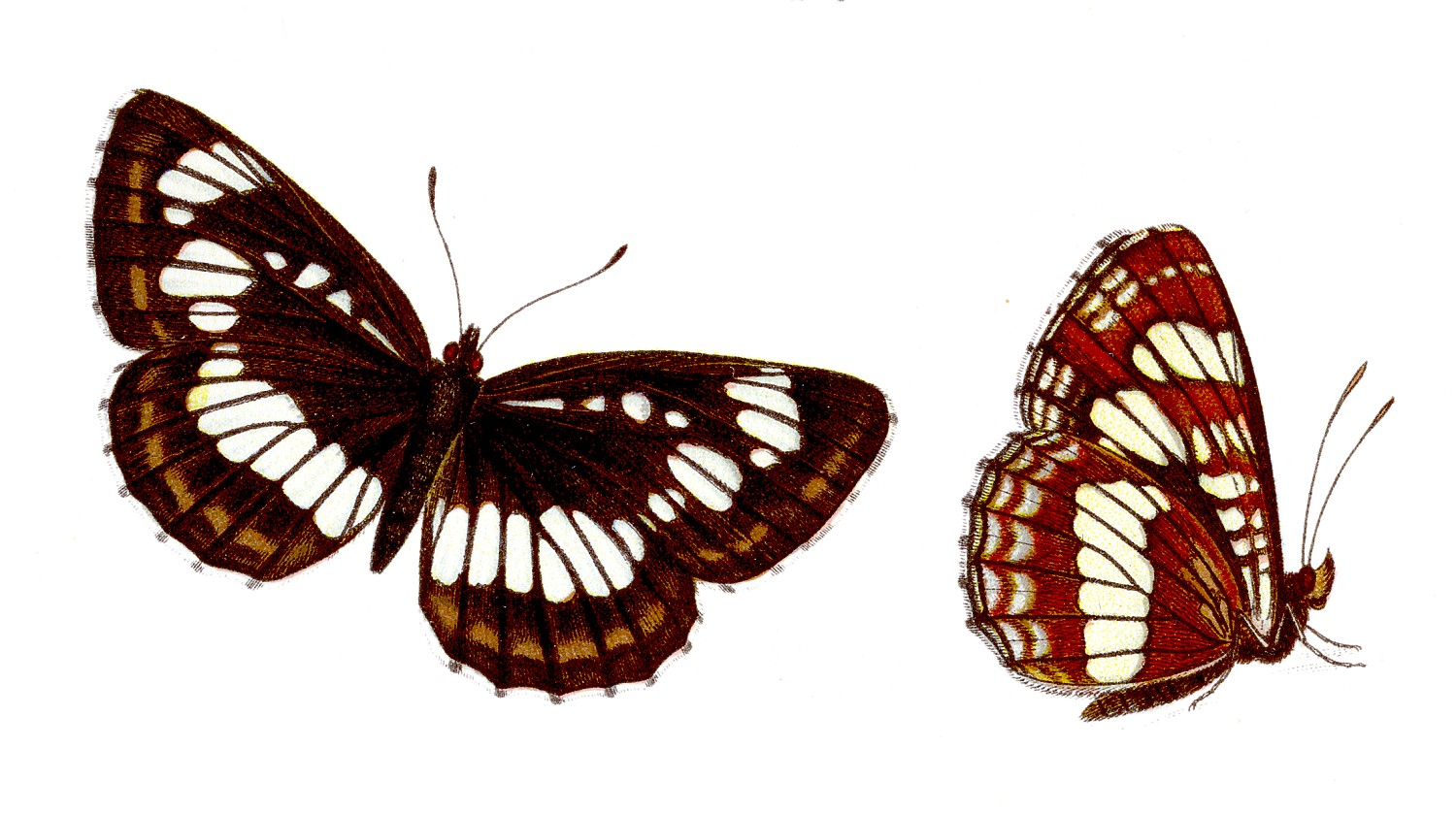

Neptis rivularis, the Hungarian glider, is a species of butterfly in the family Nymphalidae.

It lives in Central and Eastern Europe, Russia, central Asia and the Far East as far as Japan. The breadth of its wings is 25–27 mm. It prefers forest habitats, and its caterpillars feed on Spiraea.

The upper side of the forewings is black or black-brown in colour, with a band of white spots. One or more smaller white spots can also be found between the band and the wing root. The outermost wing edge is narrow and white in colour. The underside is rusty brown and otherwise shows the same white markings as the upper side. The upper side of the hind wings is also black or black-brown in colour, edged with white on the outside with a semicircular, broad, white band, which is only broken by the dark veins. The underside is rust-brown and again shows the white markings of the upper side, with the white band outlined in black. It is very similar to Neptis sappho.
