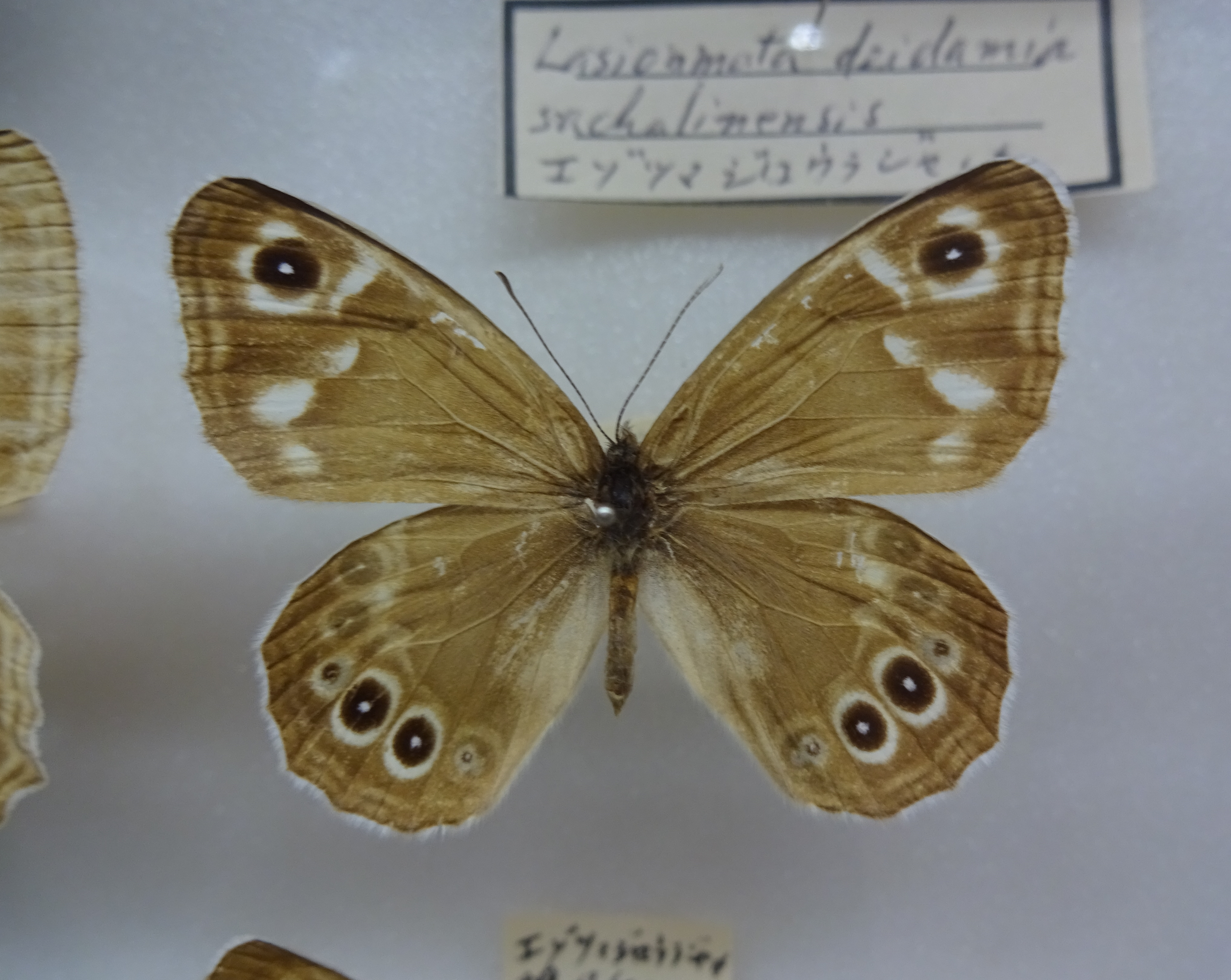
- Lopinga deidamia sachalinensis

Conservation status
- Not applicable (IUCN 3.1)

Scientific classification
- Kingdom: Animalia
- Phylum: Arthropoda
- Clade: Pancrustacea
- Class: Insecta
- Order: Lepidoptera
- Family: Nymphalidae
- Genus: Lopinga
- Species: L. deidamia

Binomial name
- Lopinga deidamia (Eversmann, 1851)

Synonyms
- Hipparchia deidamia Eversmann, 1851; Crebeta deidamia; Lasiommata deidamia; Pararge deidamia

= Lopinga deidamia =

Species of butterfly

Lopinga deidamia is a species of butterfly in the family Nymphalidae. It is found from the Urals to southern Siberia, China, Mongolia, Korea and Japan.

== Description ==
The wingspan is 45–55 mm. Seitz describes it thus-P. deidamia Ev. (menetriesi Brem.) (45 f). The male above somewhat similar to the menara male, the female with white spots proximally to as well as below the apical ocellus: both sexes recognizable by the underside, which is dark blackish brown and without the dentate hues found in the megera- maera -groups of forms. Very widely distributed, from the Ural throughout Asia, Siberia, Tibet. China and Japan. — In Korea occurs the dark form erebina Btlr., which is characterized by the more pointed forewing and strongly enlarged apical ocellus. — More singly, in some countries restricted to mountainous districts, the insect flying under trees and on road-sides, settling at puddles, the flight being weak and lazy. In the south of its area in May and again from August onward, in certain districts of China and in Amurland in July:usually rare. As in the case of maera a whole series of special forms might be separated in accordance with locality and season.

== Biology ==
Adults are on wing from June to August in one or two generations per year.

The larvae feed on Agrostis, Calamagrostis and Elymus (syn. Elytrigia) species.

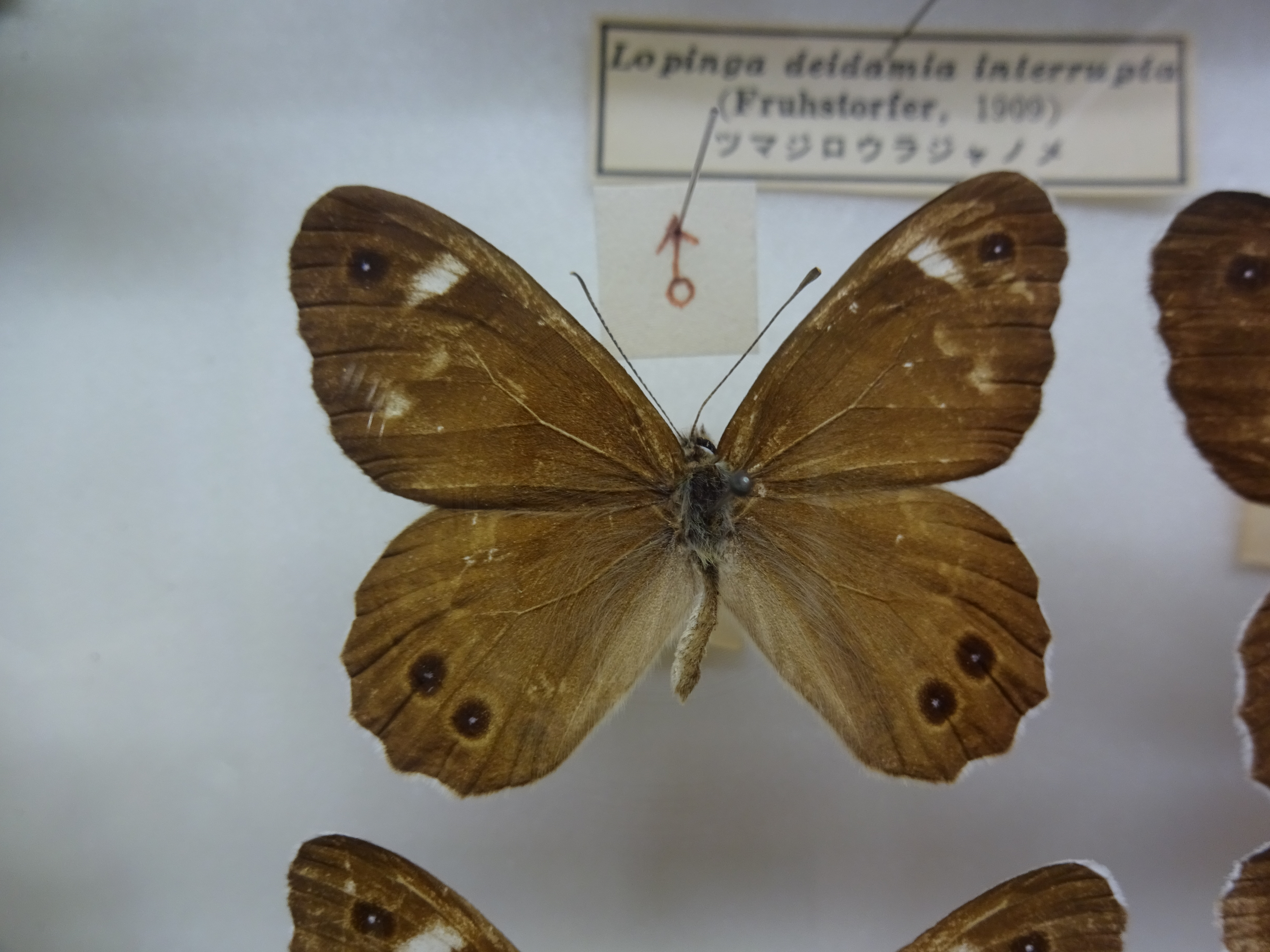
Lopinga deidamia interrupta

== Subspecies ==
- Lopinga deidamia deidamia
- Lopinga deidamia erebina Butler, 1883 (Amur, Ussuri)
- Lopinga deidamia sachalinensis Matsumura, 1911 (Sakhalin)
- Lopinga deidamia interrupta Fruhstorfer, 1909
- Lopinga deidamia kampuzana Y. Yamazaki, 1981
