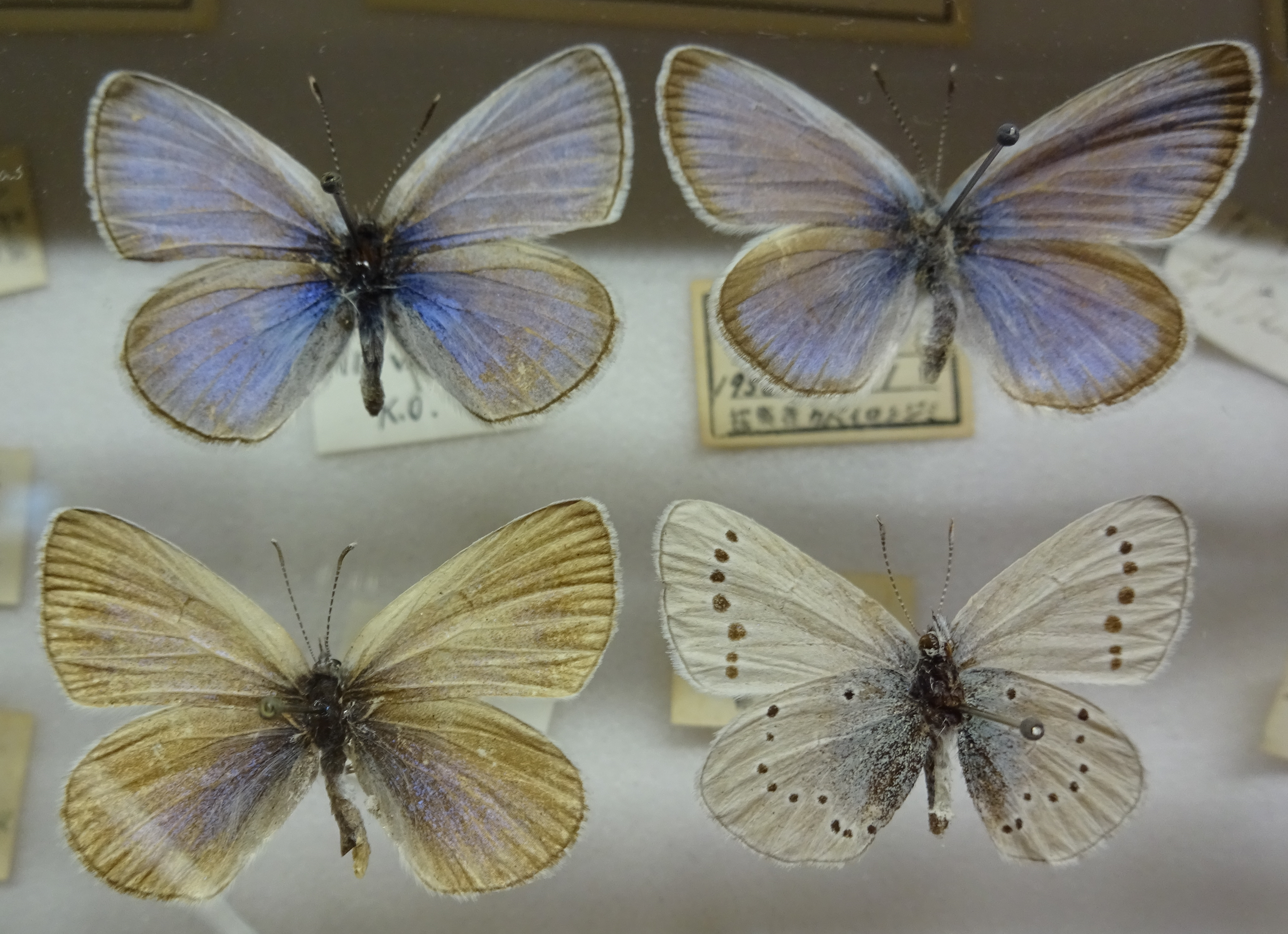

Scientific classification
- Domain: Eukaryota
- Kingdom: Animalia
- Phylum: Arthropoda
- Class: Insecta
- Order: Lepidoptera
- Family: Lycaenidae
- Genus: Glaucopsyche
- Species: G. lycormas

Binomial name
- Glaucopsyche lycormas (Butler, 1866)

Synonyms
- Polyommatus lycormas Butler, 1866; Lycaena lada Kozhantshikov, 1936; Lycaena lycormas tomariana Matsumura, 1928; Lycaena scylla Oberthür, 1880

= Glaucopsyche lycormas =

Species of butterfly

Glaucopsyche lycormas is a butterfly of the family Lycaenidae. It is found in the East Palearctic in Siberia, Mongolia, China, Korea and Japan.

== Subspecies ==
- Glaucopsyche lycormas lycormas (South Siberia (east of Ob), Russian Far East, Sakhalin, Mongolia, Northeast China, Korea, Japan)
- Glaucopsyche lycormas lederi O. Bang-Haas, 1907 (South Siberia, Kuznetsky Alatau, Salair, North Altai, East Sayan, Transbaikalia, Mongolia)
- Glaucopsyche lycormas scylla (Oberthür, 1880) (Amur, Ussuri)
- Glaucopsyche lycormas tomariana (Matsumura, 1928) (Kunashir, Kuriles)
