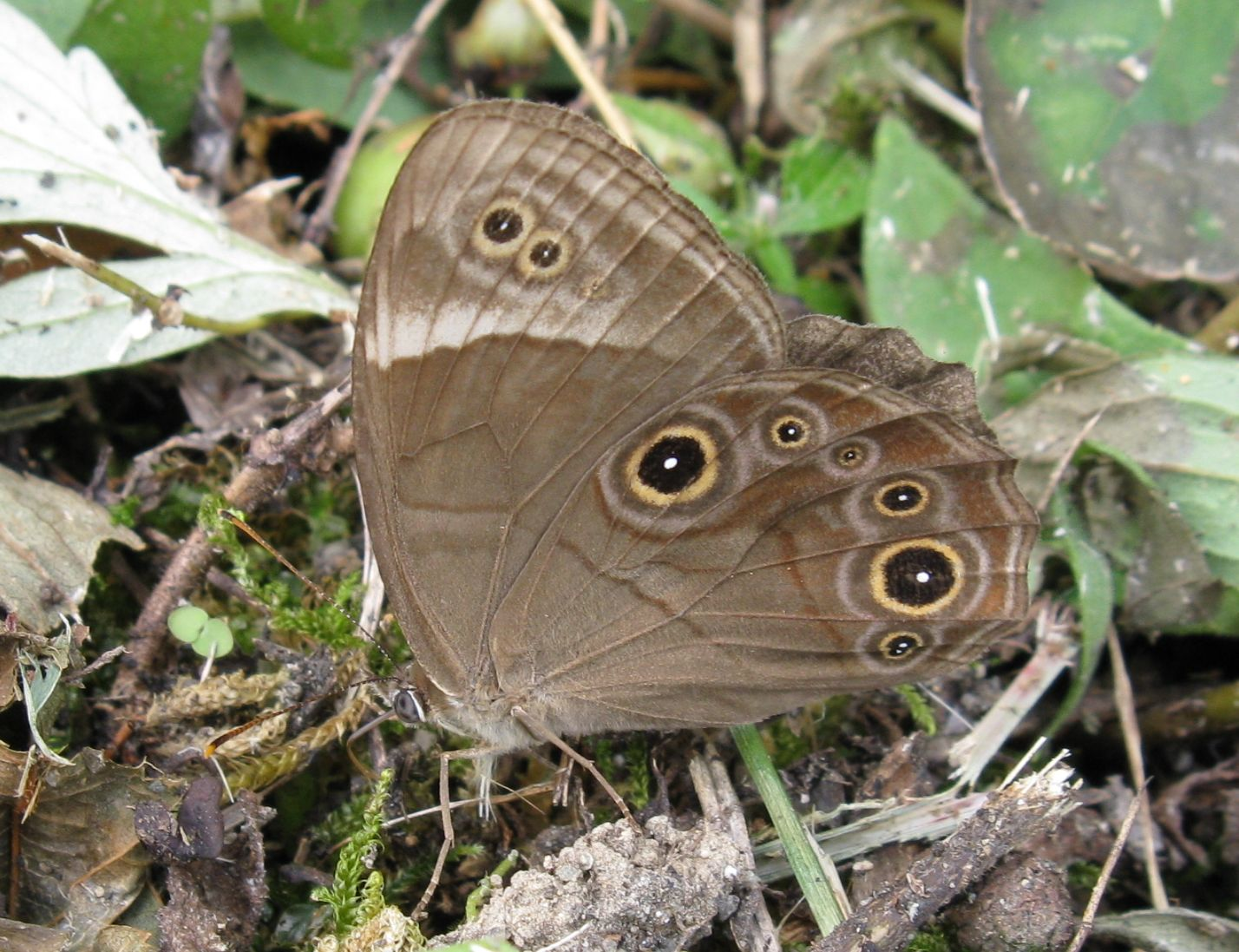

Scientific classification
- Domain: Eukaryota
- Kingdom: Animalia
- Phylum: Arthropoda
- Class: Insecta
- Order: Lepidoptera
- Family: Nymphalidae
- Genus: Lethe
- Species: L. diana

Binomial name
- Lethe diana (Butler, 1866)

Synonyms
- Debis diana Butler, 1866

= Lethe diana =

Species of butterfly

Lethe diana, the Diana treebrown, is a brush-footed butterfly (subfamily Satyrinae) in the family Nymphalidae. Its wings are a dark shade of brown, with an eyespot pattern, and a wingspan of about 45–55 mm. It resembles Lethe confusa; however, the Lethe confusa bears a white band on its wings, setting them apart.

== Description ==
The Lethe diana's wingspan ranges from 45 to 55 mm. Its forewings are dark brown, and sometimes have white belt-like patterns that are more apparent on the female. The hindwings are also dark brown with an eyespot pattern adorning the back, with about one or two small eyespots and on the forewings, and six eyespots ranging in size on the hindwing. The veins are a distinctly noticeable darker brown.

== Range ==
The Lethe diana can be found in regions of Russia such as Primorye, Sakhalin and South Kuril. Regions of Japan such as Hokkaido, Honshu, Shikoku, Kyushu and Tsushima.

== Habitat ==
Lethe diana can be found in deciduous forests from flatlands and mountains.

== Life cycle ==
The Lehte diana undergoes the four stages of complete metamorphosis:

=== Eggs ===
Eggs are laid singularly under the surface of a blade of bamboo grass, and the larvae grows on its own.

== Larval host plants ==
- Sasa kuriles

== Adult food sources ==
- Quercus acutissima – saw tooth oak
- Quercus serrata – deciduous oak tree
- Phyllostachys nigra - black bamboo
- Phyllostachys reticulata
- Pleioblastus simonii
- Pleioblastus chino
- Sasa borealis
- Sasa kurilensis - evergreen bamboo
- Sasa veitchii
- Arundinaria - cane
- Poacae
- Sasa - broadleaf bamboo

Lethe diana is also known to suck the fluids of carrion in a process known as mud-puddling.

== Subspecies ==
- Lethe diana diana
- Lethe diana australis
- Lethe diana sachalinensis (southern Sakhalin)
- Lethe diana tomariope (Kurile Islands)
- Lethe diana mikuraensis (Honshu, Japan)
