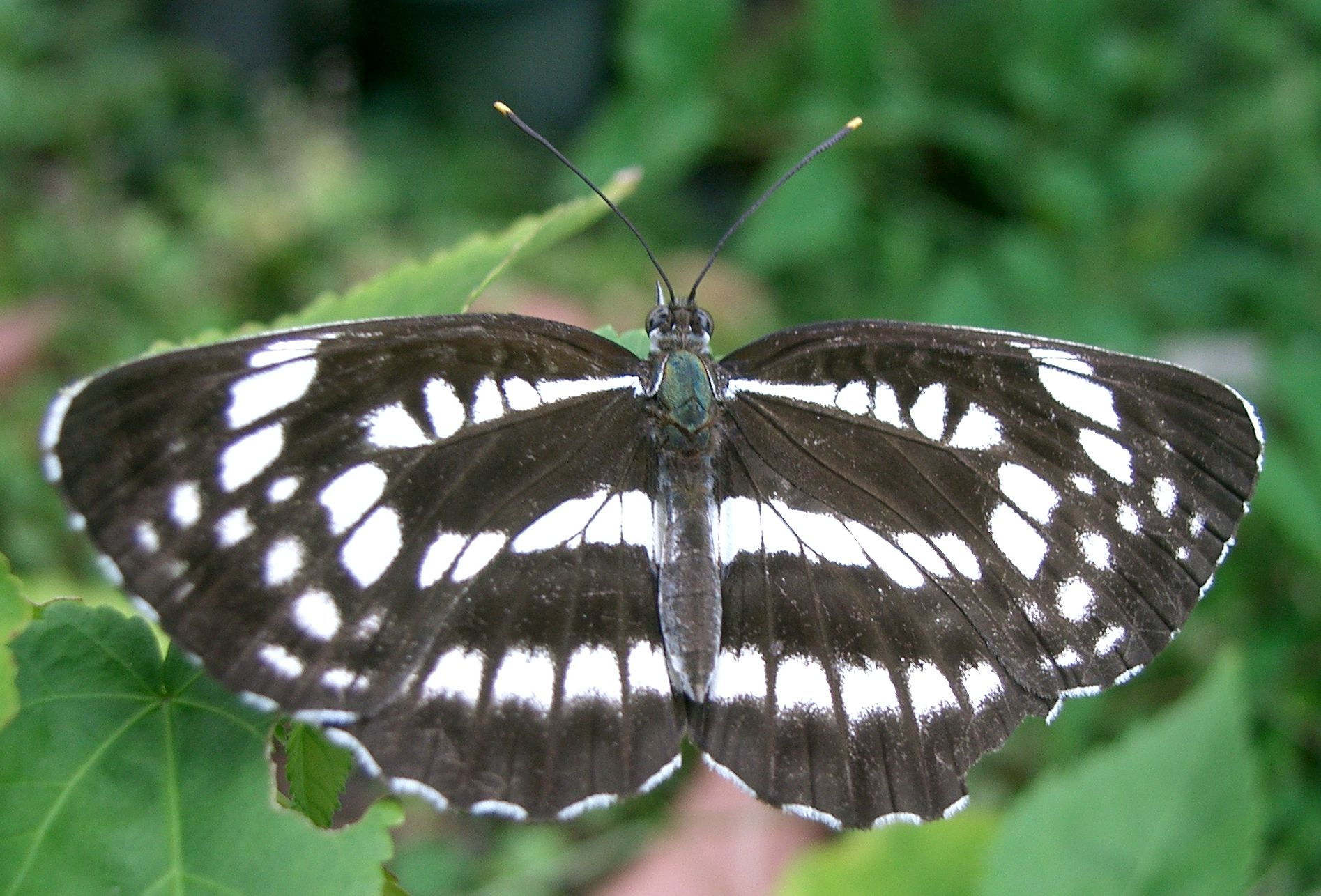

Scientific classification
- Kingdom: Animalia
- Phylum: Arthropoda
- Class: Insecta
- Order: Lepidoptera
- Family: Nymphalidae
- Genus: Neptis
- Species: N. pryeri

Binomial name
- Neptis pryeri Butler, 1871

= Neptis pryeri =

Species of butterfly

Neptis pryeri is a butterfly of the family Nymphalidae. It is found in China, North Asia, Korea and Japan.

The length of the fore-wings is 21–30 mm. Adults are on wing from June to August.

The larvae feed on Spiraea morrisonicola and Spiraea japonica.

== Subspecies ==
There are five recognised subspecies:

- Neptis pryeri pryeri
- Neptis pryeri koreana (Korea)
- Neptis pryeri arboretorum (China)
- Neptis pryeri jucundita (Taiwan)
- Neptis pryeri oberthueri (Western China)
