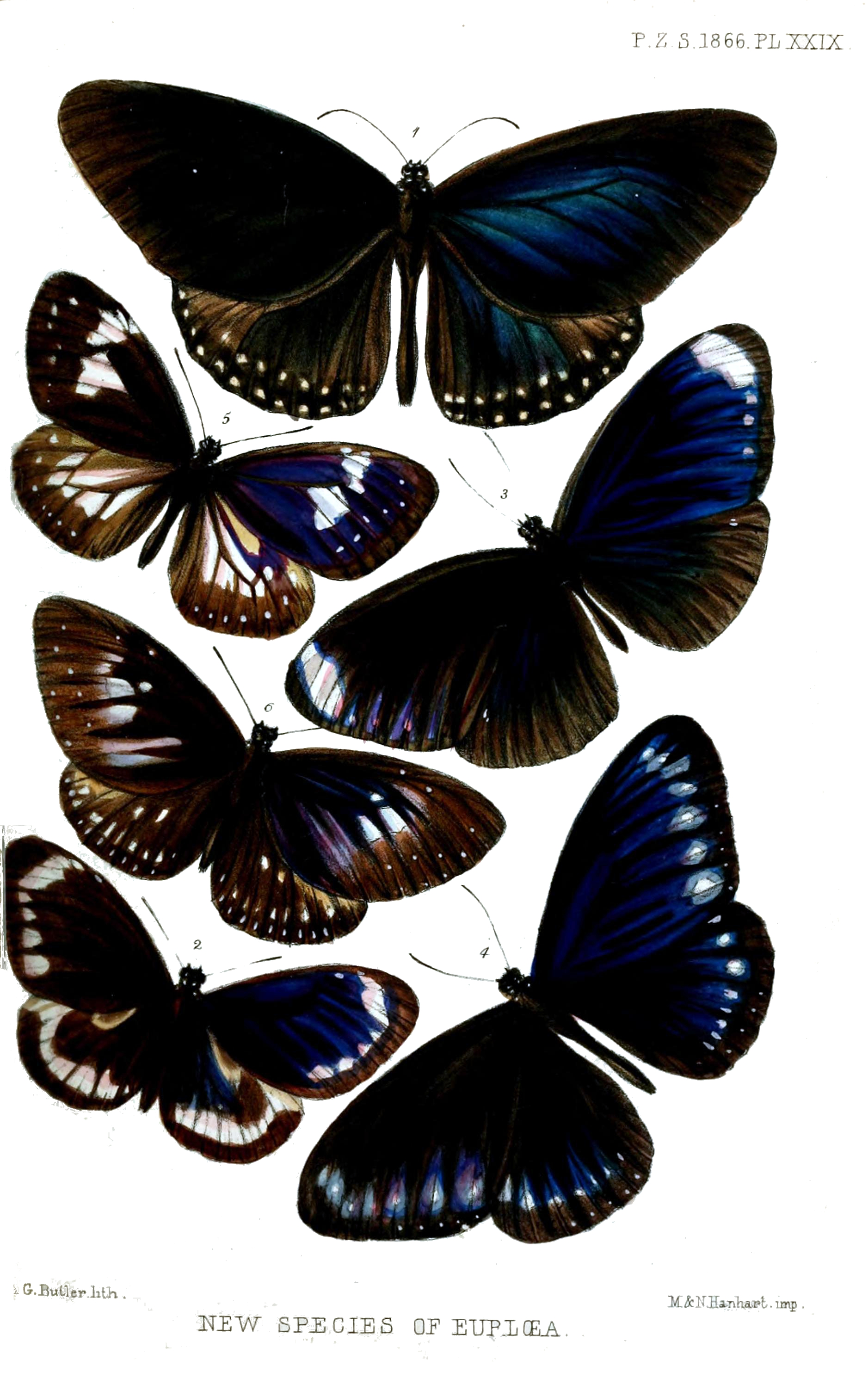
- Butler's plate depicting E. camaralzeman (figure 1)

Scientific classification
- Kingdom: Animalia
- Phylum: Arthropoda
- Clade: Pancrustacea
- Class: Insecta
- Order: Lepidoptera
- Family: Nymphalidae
- Genus: Euploea
- Species: E. camaralzeman

Binomial name
- Euploea camaralzeman Butler, 1866

Synonyms
- Euploea stolli Weymer, 1885; Isamia carpenteri Moore, [1890]; Euploea malayica harmseni van Eecke, 1918; Euploea roduna Fruhstorfer, 1911; Euploea hübneri Moore, 1883; Euploea nesica Hulstaert, 1931; Euploea deficiens Dufrane, 1948; Euploea cratis Butler, 1866; Crastia malayica Butler, 1878; Crastia scudderii Butler, 1878; Euploea (Adigama) claudina Staudinger, 1889; Euploea malayica hypanis Fruhstorfer, 1910; Euploea ochsenheimeri Moore, 1857; Euploea paraclaudina Pendlebury, 1939

= Euploea camaralzeman =

Species of butterfly

Euploea camaralzeman is an Indomalayan species of danaine butterfly.

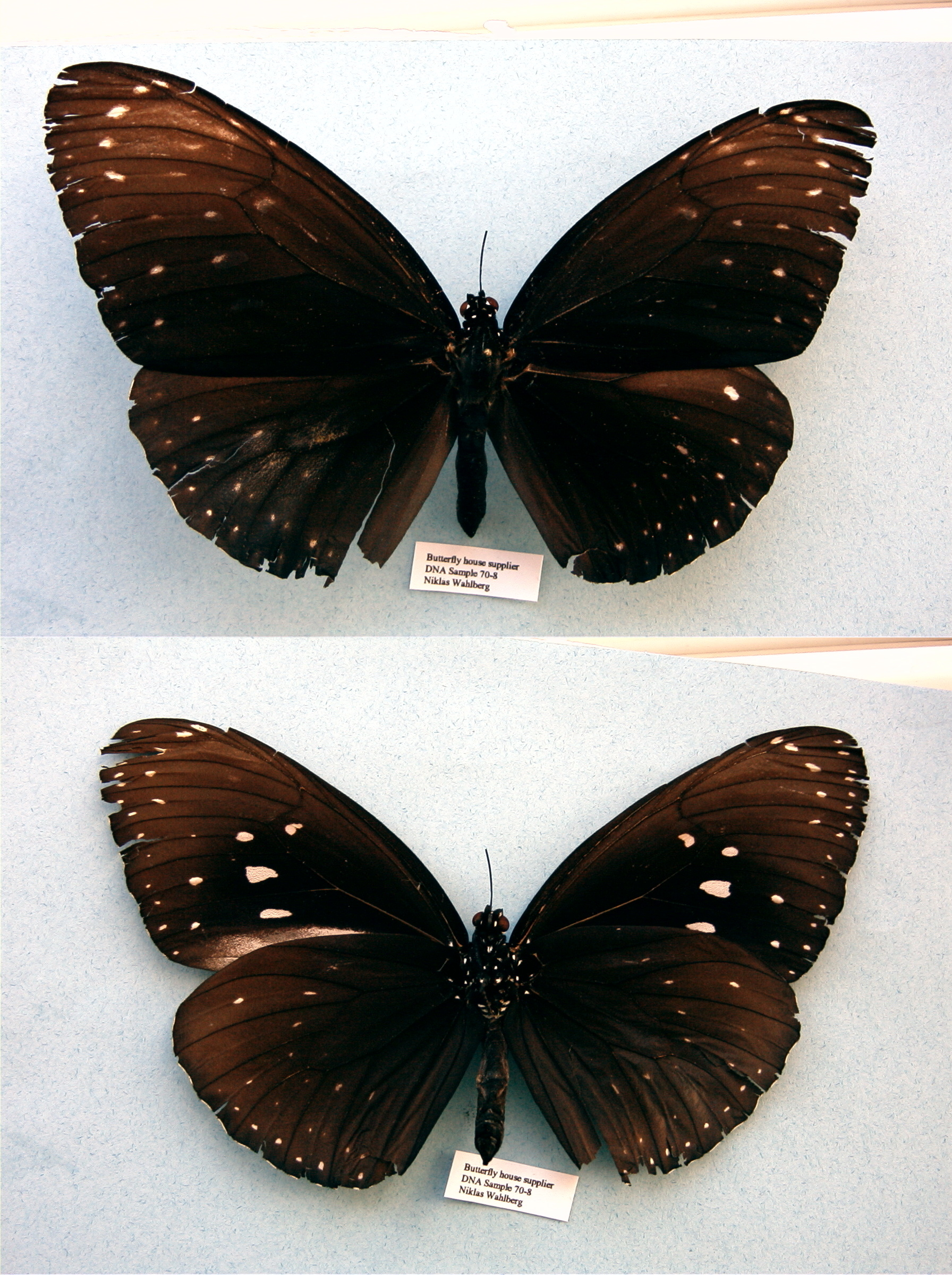

The larva feeds on Strophanthus dichotomus.

== Subspecies ==
- E. c. camaralzeman (Burma, Thailand, Vietnam)
- E. c. claudina Staudinger, 1889(Palawan)
- E. c. cratis Butler, 1866 (Philippines: Luzon, Babuyanes; Japan)
- E. c. formosana Matsumura, 1919 (Taiwan, Japan)
- E. c. hypanis Fruhstorfer, 1910(Java, Lesser Sunda)
- E. c. malayica (Butler, 1878) (Sumatra, Peninsular Malaya) – Langkawi Malayan crow
- E. c. paraclaudina (Pendlebury, 1939) (Peninsular Malaya)
- E. c. scudderi (Butler, 1878) (Borneo)
