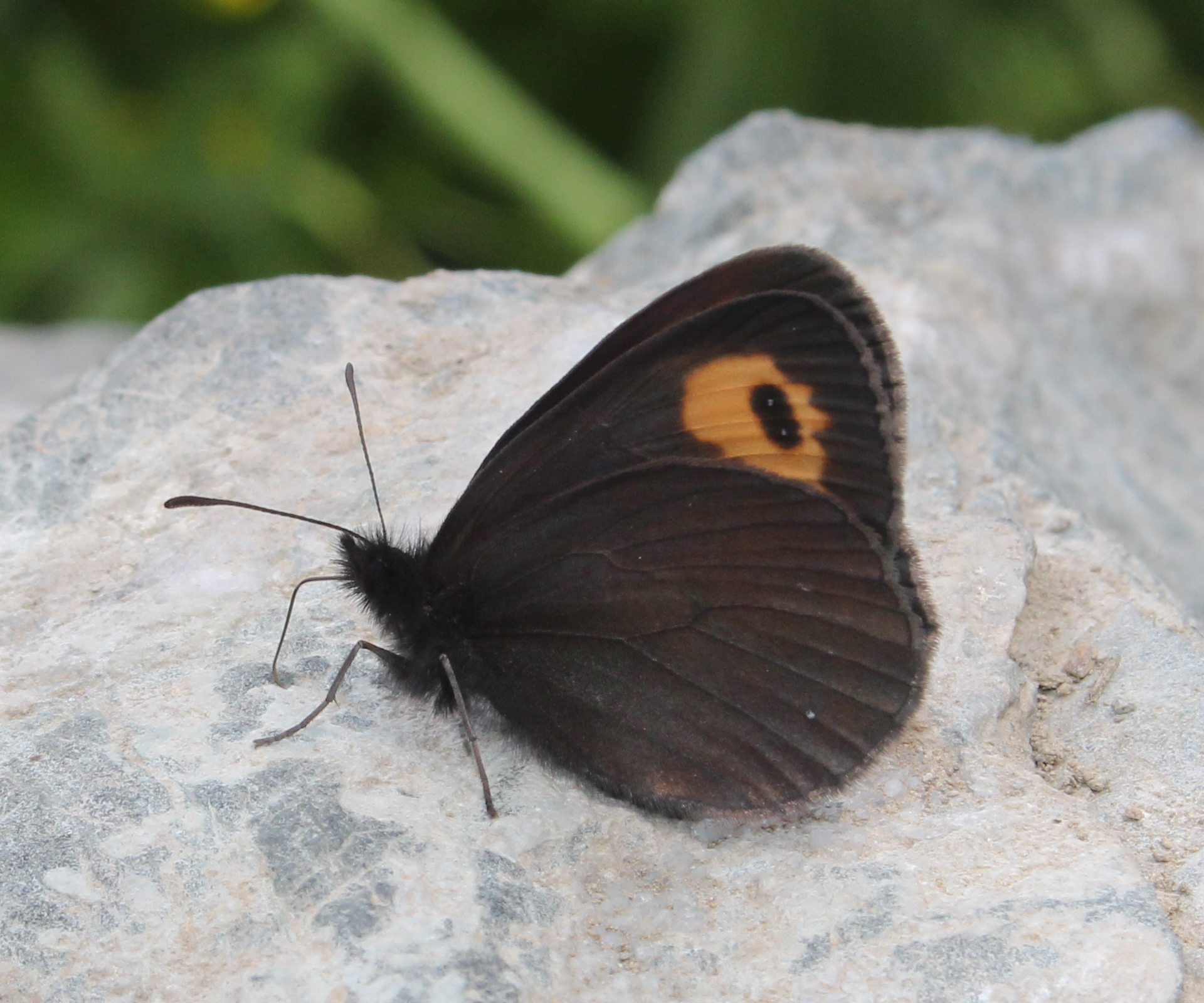

Scientific classification
- Domain: Eukaryota
- Kingdom: Animalia
- Phylum: Arthropoda
- Class: Insecta
- Order: Lepidoptera
- Family: Nymphalidae
- Genus: Erebia
- Species: E. niphonica

Binomial name
- Erebia niphonica Janson, 1877

Synonyms
- Erebia sedakovii niphonica ab. assamana Matsumura, 1928; Erebia sedakovii niphonica ab. yatsugadakeana Matsumura, 1928; Erebia sedakovii niphonica ab. komagadakeana Matsumura, 1928; Erebia sedakovii niphonica ab. shiroumana Matsumura, 1928; Erebia sedakovii niphonica ab. yazawai Matsumura, 1928; Erebia shinaensis Kanda & Fujimori, 1931; Erebia scoparia Butler, [1882]

= Erebia niphonica =

Species of butterfly

Erebia niphonica is an East Palearctic species of satyrine butterfly endemic to Japan, Sakhalin and the Kuril Islands.

The larva on feeds on Calamagrostis and Carex species.

== Subspecies ==
- E. n. niphonica (Sakhalin)
- E. n. doii Nakahara, 1926 (Kuriles)
- E. n. mikuniana Nakahara, 1942 (Japan)
- E. n. mikudai Nakahara (Japan)
- E. n. sakae Torii, 1945 (Japan)
- E. n. okadai Torii, 1945 (Japan)
- E. n. hayachineana Okano, 1954 (Japan)
- E. n. sugitanii Shirôzu, 1957 (Japan)
- E. n. shibutsuana Shirôzu, 1957 (Japan)
- E. n. gassana Okano & Doi, 1957 (Japan: Honshu)
- E. n. yakeishidakeana Okano, 1958 (Japan: northern Honshu)
- E. n. shirahatai Okano, 1958 (Japan: northern Honshu)
- E. n. asahidakeana Okano, 1958 (Japan: northern Honshu)
- E. n. nyukasana Murayama, 1963 (Japan)
- E. n. tateyamana Murayama, 1963 (Japan)
- E. n. yoshisakana Murayama, 1963 (Japan)
- E. n. amarisana Murayama, 1964 (Japan)
- E. n. togakusiana Murayama, 1964 (Japan)
- E. n. expleta Churkin, 2005 (Sakhalin)
