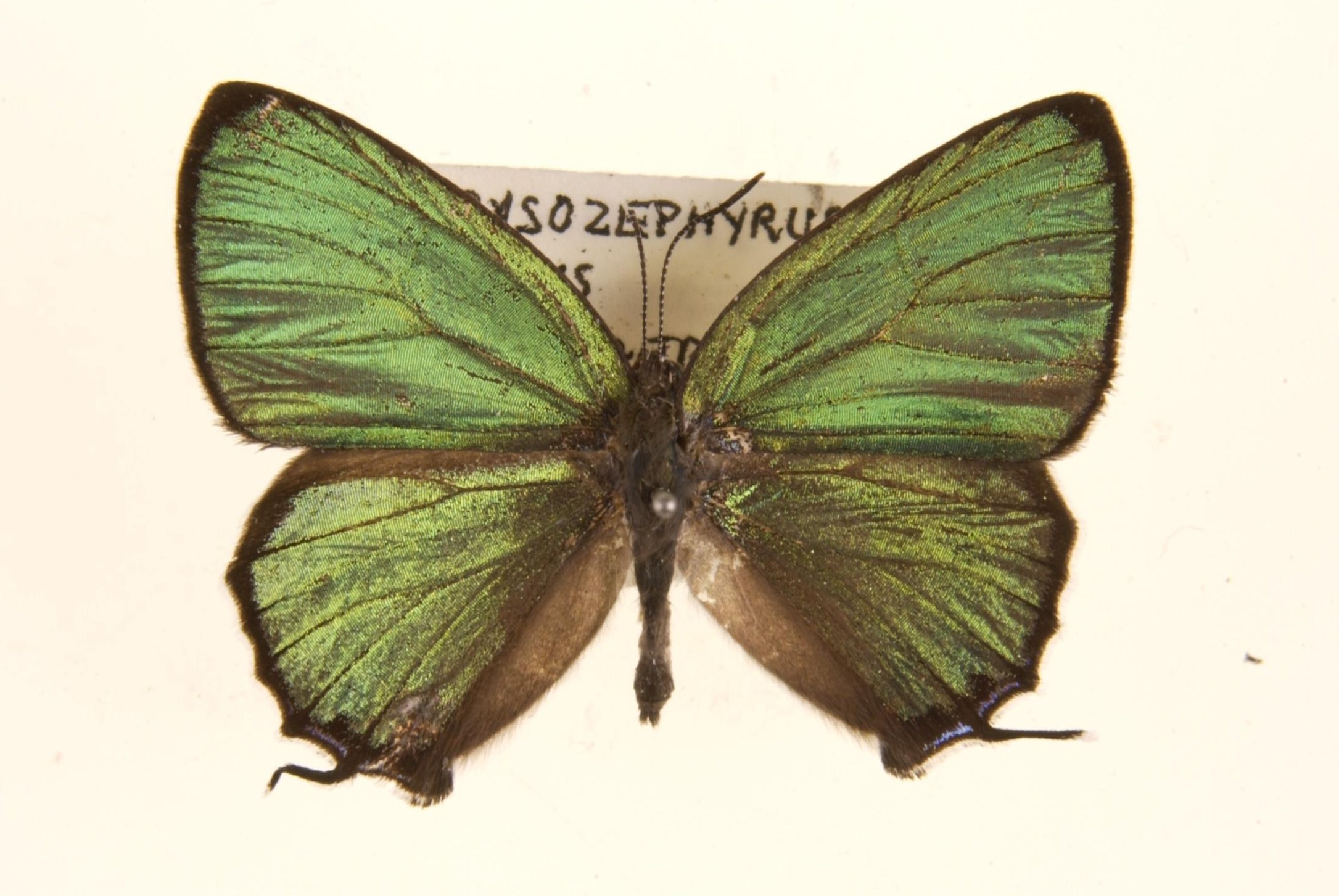
- Specimen from Japan
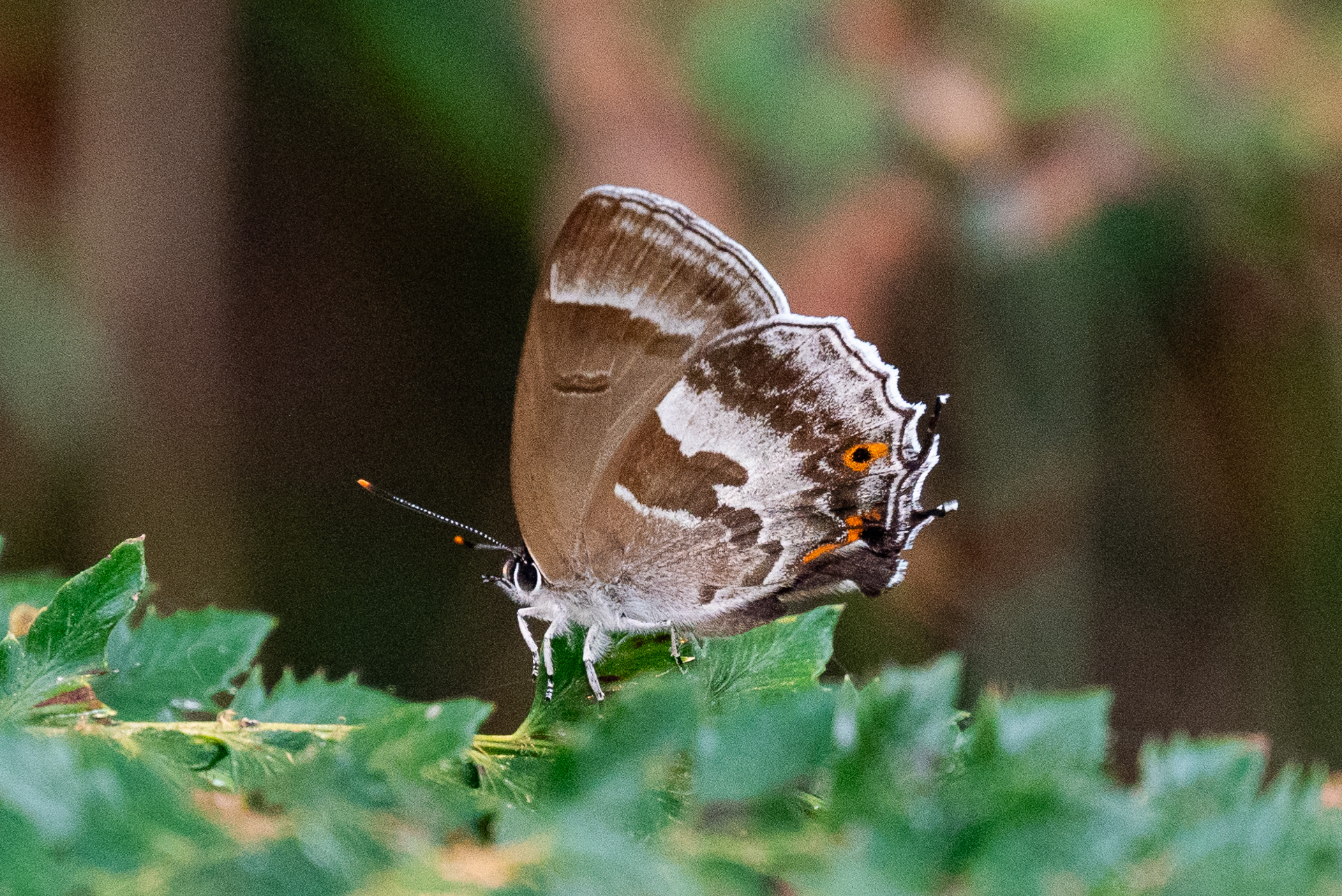

Scientific classification
- Kingdom: Animalia
- Phylum: Arthropoda
- Clade: Pancrustacea
- Class: Insecta
- Order: Lepidoptera
- Family: Lycaenidae
- Tribe: Theclini
- Genus: Thermozephyrus; Inomata & Itagaki, 1986
- Species: T. ataxus

Binomial name
- Thermozephyrus ataxus (Westwood, 1851)

Synonyms
- Dipsas ataxus Westwood, 1851; Thecla ataxus; Dipsas katura Hewitson, 1865; Zephyrus zulla Tytler, 1915; Zephyrus ataxus var. kirishimaensis Okajima, 1922; Chrysozephyrus lingi Okano & Okura, 1969; Chrysozephyrus subnivalis Kawazoe & Wakabayashi, 1969; Chrysozephyrus ataxus Westwood, [1851]

= Thermozephyrus =

Monotypic butterfly genus in family Lycaenidae

Thermozephyrus ataxus, the wonderful hairstreak, is a small butterfly found from India to Japan that belongs to the lycaenids or blues family.

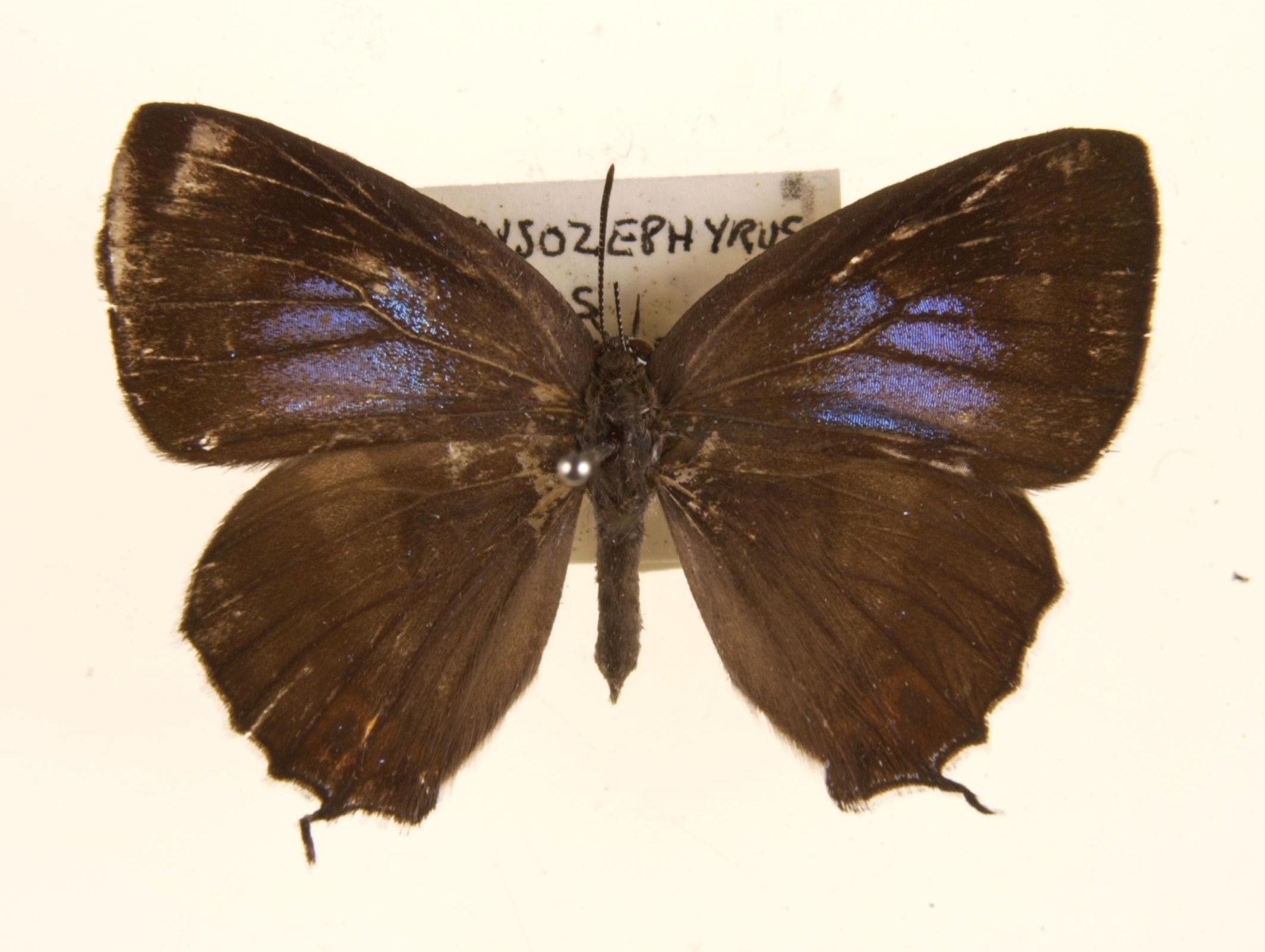
Female

== Taxonomy ==
The butterfly was previously classified as Thecla ataxus Doubleday. It is also presently classified as Chrysozephyrus ataxus.

== Range ==
The species occurs in Murree (Pakistan), and in India from Jammu and Kashmir to Kumaon and in the Naga Hills. In general, the range extends from the western Himalayas to China and Japan.

== Subspecies ==
- Thermozephyrus ataxus ataxus (north-western India to Upper Burma)
- Thermozephyrus ataxus kirishimaensis (Okajima, 1922) (Japan)
- Thermozephyrus ataxus lingi (Okano & Okura, 1969) (Taiwan)
- Thermozephyrus ataxus motohiroi (Fujioka, 2001)
- Thermozephyrus ataxus yakushimaensis (Yazaki, 1924) (Japan)
- Thermozephyrus ataxus tsukiyamai (Fujioka, 2001) (Myanmar)
- Thermozephyrus ataxus zulla (Tytler, 1915) (Assam, western China)

== See also ==
- Lycaenidae
- List of butterflies of India (Lycaenidae)
