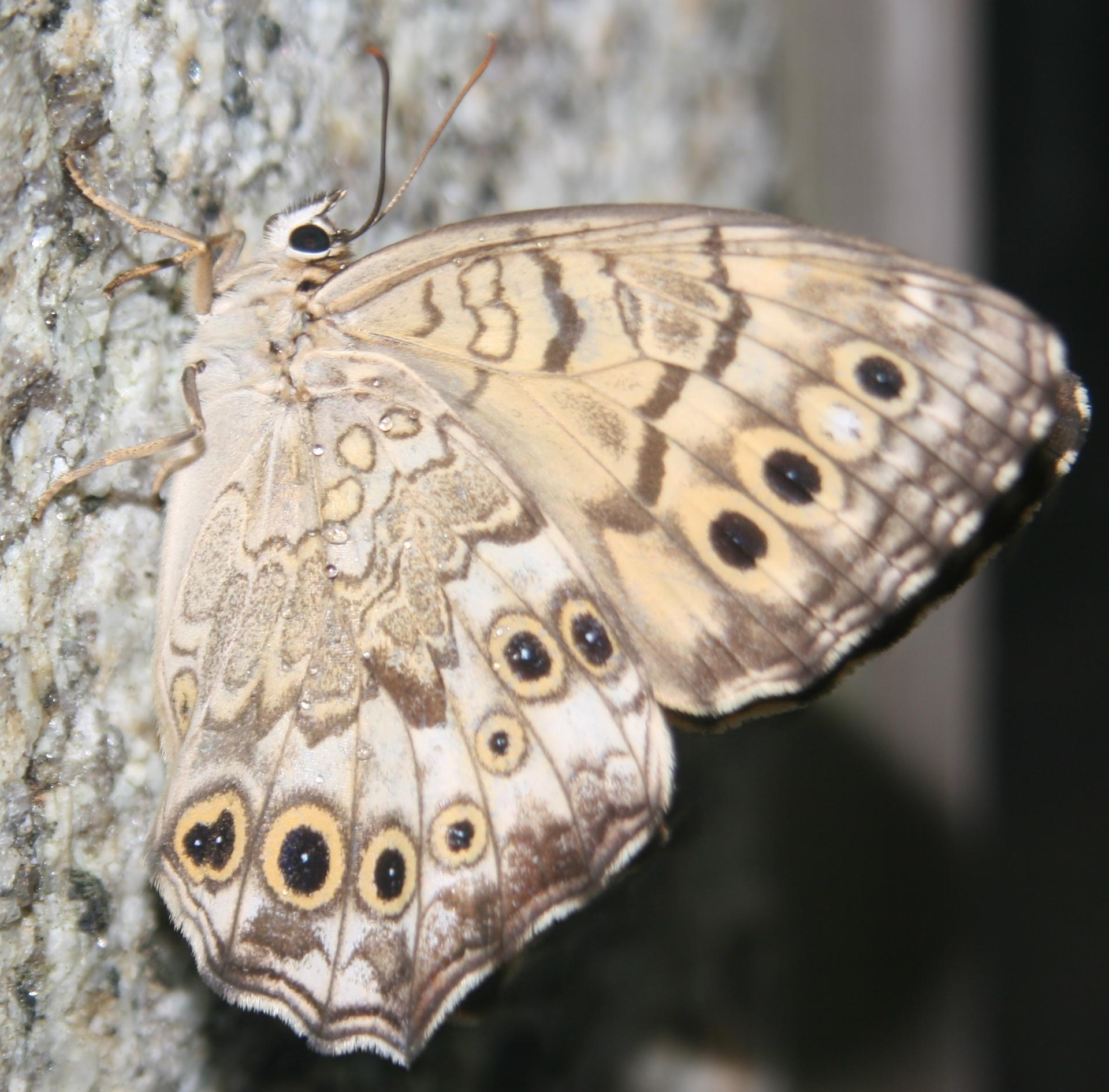

Scientific classification
- Kingdom: Animalia
- Phylum: Arthropoda
- Class: Insecta
- Order: Lepidoptera
- Family: Nymphalidae
- Genus: Neope
- Species: N. niphonica

Binomial name
- Neope niphonica Butler, 1881

= Neope niphonica =

Species of butterfly

Neope niphonica is a member of the Nymphalidae butterfly family found in East Asia.
