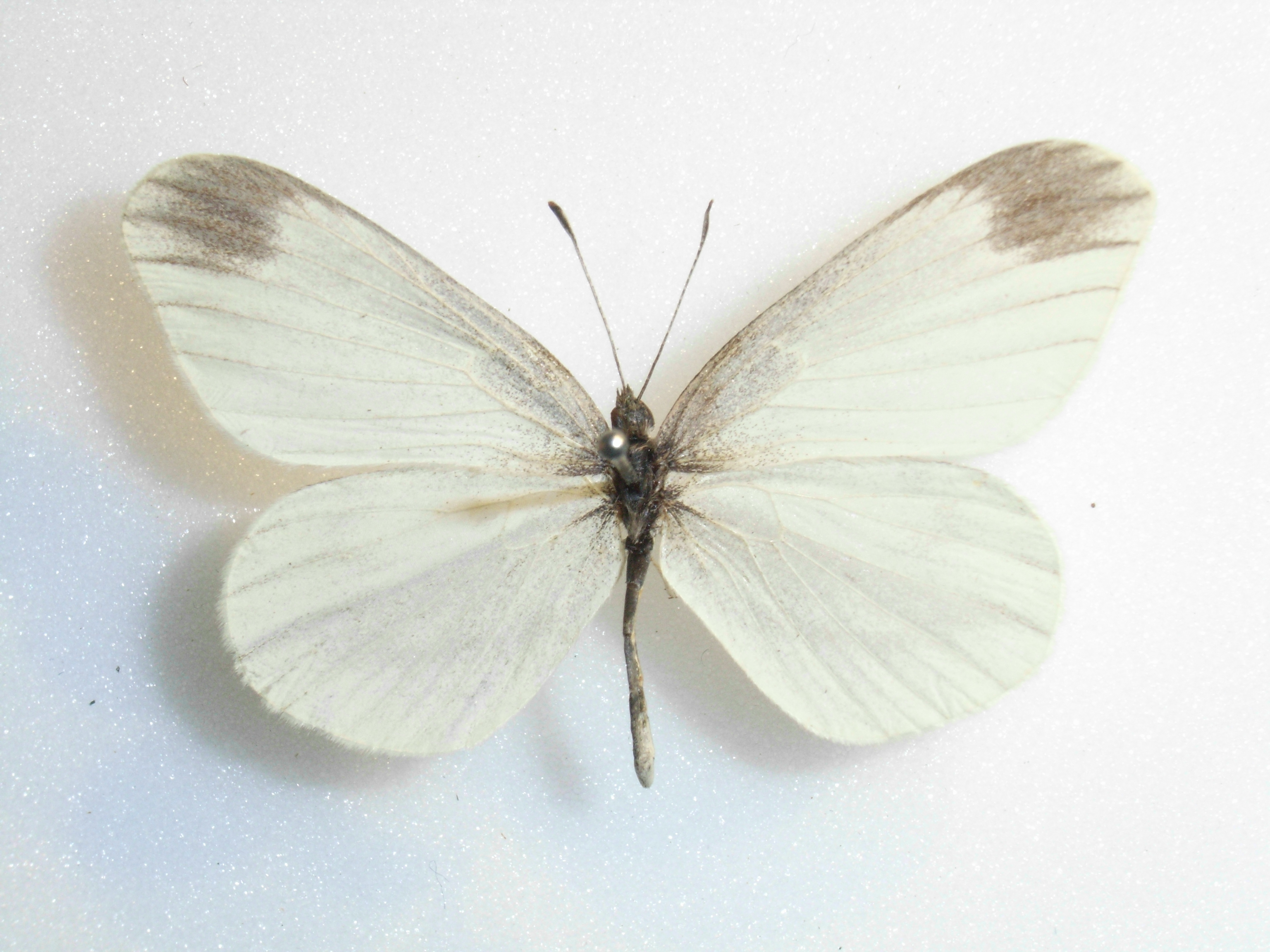

Scientific classification
- Kingdom: Animalia
- Phylum: Arthropoda
- Clade: Pancrustacea
- Class: Insecta
- Order: Lepidoptera
- Family: Pieridae
- Genus: Leptidea
- Species: L. amurensis

Binomial name
- Leptidea amurensis Ménétriés, 1859

= Leptidea amurensis =

Species of butterfly

Leptidea amurensis is a butterfly of the family Pieridae. It is found from western Siberia to the Ussuri region and in North Korea, China, Mongolia and Japan.

== Description in Seitz ==
L. amurensis from the Amur, North China and Japan, is especially characterised by the elongate forewing. The upperside is white, the male having a larger blackish subapical patch, which is absent from the female or is much smaller and less well marked; the underside is white, with a yellowish apical spot on the forewing and grey shadows markings on the hindwing. — The spring-form vernalis Graes. is smaller, being darker beneath. — vibilia Janson[ now L. sinapis ssp. vibilia Janson, 1878], from North Japan, has more pointed wings than amurensis being similar to duponcheli in markings and colour. — morsei Fenton is apparently an aberration in which the subapical spot of the forewing above is less developed.

== Biology ==
The larvae feed on Hedysarum ussuriense, Lupinus species and Vicia amoena.

== Subspecies ==
- Leptidea amurensis amurensis
- Leptidea amurensis emisinapis (Altai, Sayan, Transbaikalia)
- Leptidea amurensis jacutia (Yakutia)
- Leptidea amurensis japana
