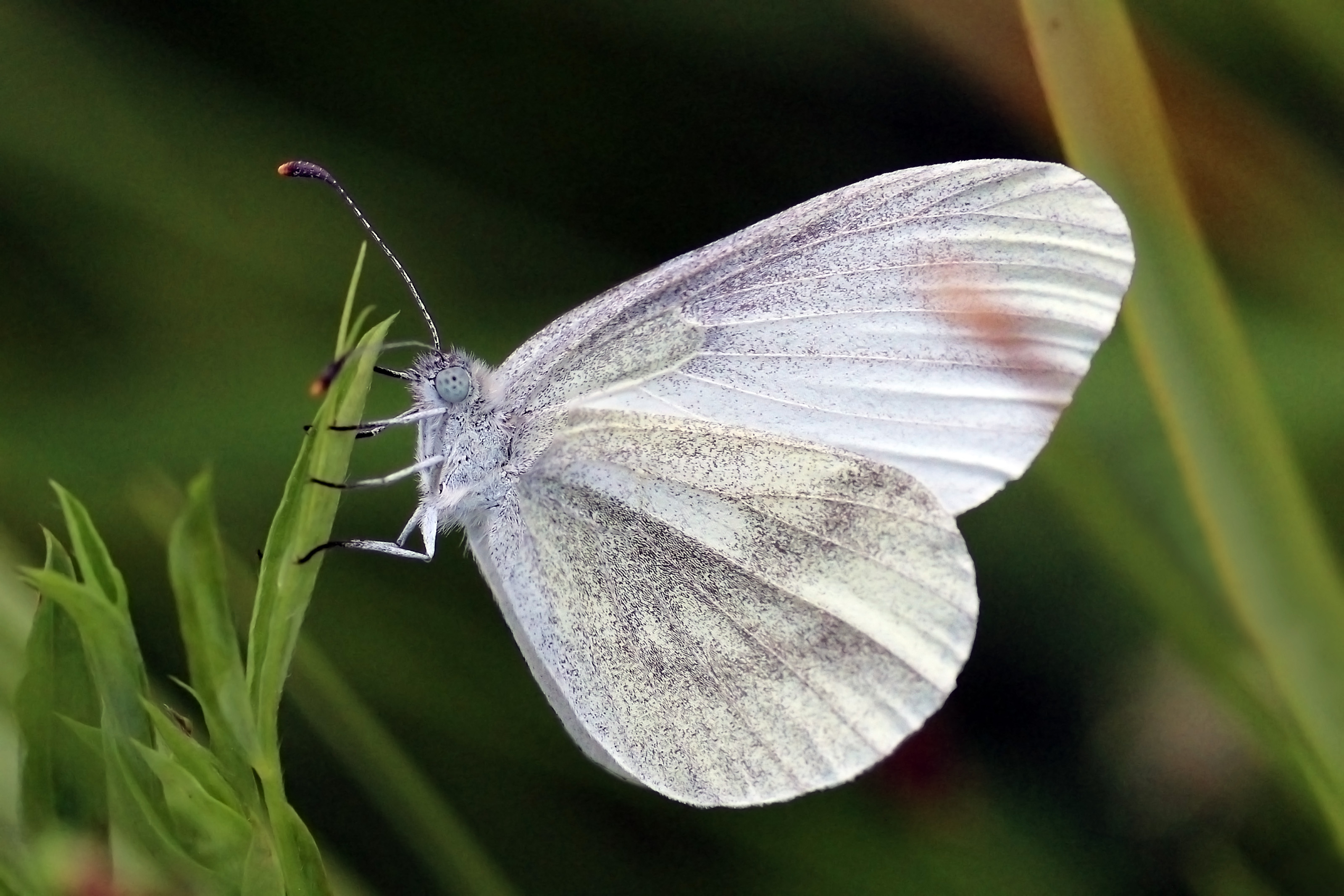
- Kampinos Forest, Poland
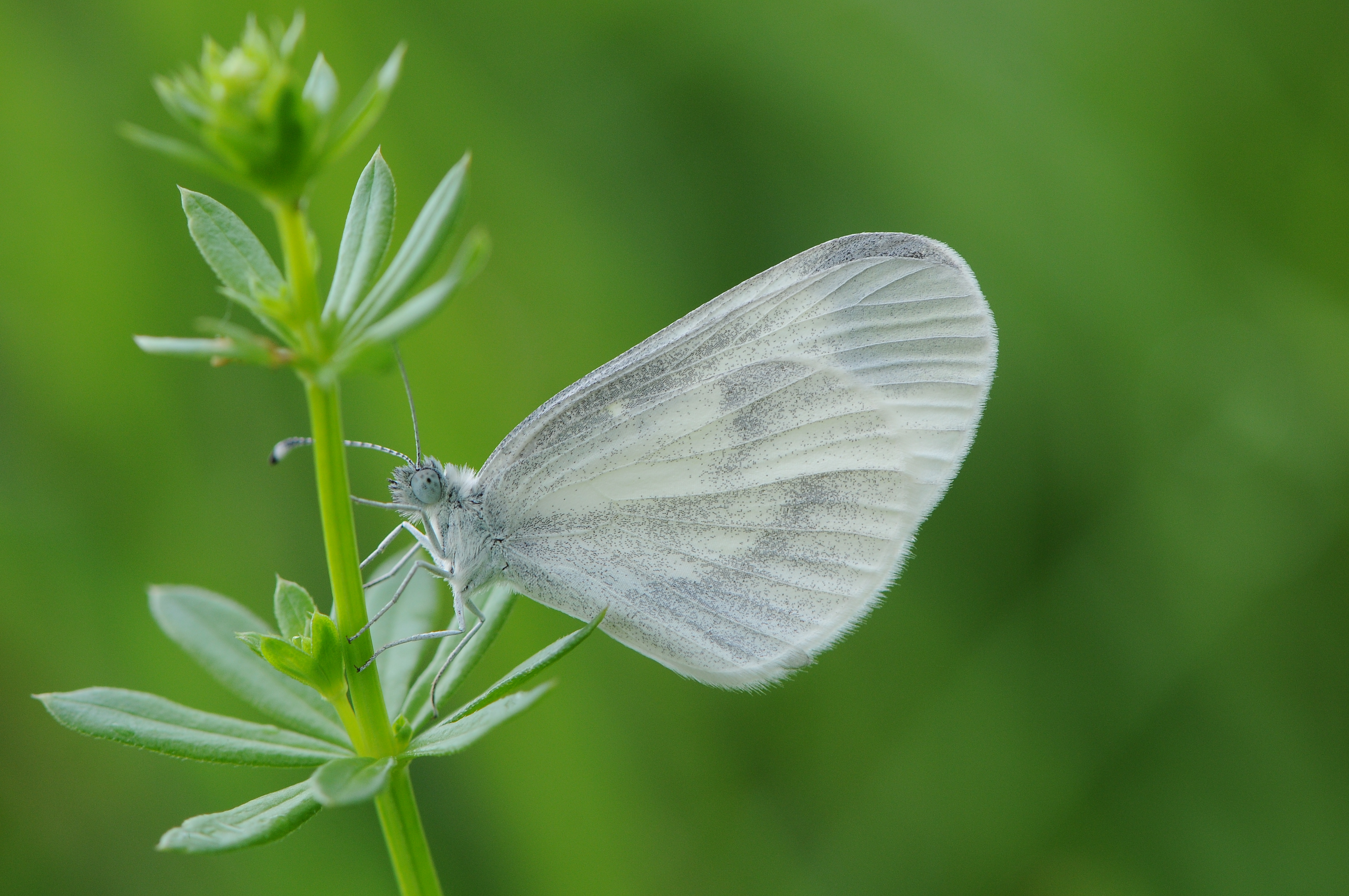
- Sennwald, Switzerland

Scientific classification
- Kingdom: Animalia
- Phylum: Arthropoda
- Class: Insecta
- Order: Lepidoptera
- Family: Pieridae
- Genus: Leptidea
- Species: L. sinapis

Binomial name
- Leptidea sinapis (Linnaeus, 1758)

= Leptidea sinapis =

Wood white butterfly

Species of butterfly

Leptidea sinapis, or the wood white butterfly of the family Pieridae, is a small white butterfly that is mainly found in England, Ireland, and Northern Europe. The butterfly has white wings with grey or yellow markings near the center or tip of the wing. It flies slowly and low over its shrubbery habitat. Males initiate courtship with females and can mate multiply, while females tend to only mate once in their lifetime.

The wood white was added to the UK BAP Priority Species list in 2005 due to a substantial decline in the population, especially in England. This decline has been attributed to changes in woodland regions, including increased shade due to tree planting, and the failure to maintain woodland rides in a satisfactory way for wood whites to oviposit. Conservation efforts are currently striving to understand how to best maintain woodland regions and are examining the effect of climate change (particularly during the winter months) on egg survival.

== Taxonomy ==
There are several subspecies of L. sinapis. These subspecies are all found in nearby regions, and thus geographical variation is slight. The following subspecies are recognized:

- L. s. sinapis (Linnaeus, 1758) Sweden, western Siberia, the southern Altai
- L. s. pseudodiniensis (Pfeiffer, 1927) the Caucasus, Kopet-Dagh
- L. s. melanoinspersa Verity, 1911 western and northern Tian-Shan, Dzungarian Alatau, Alay Mountains
- There is an uncertainly ranked form from Darvaz.

These subspecies, although they look similar, are different in the physiology of their genitals and are reproductively isolated from the wood white due to female conspecific mating choice.

== Geographic range ==
The wood white is found in Europe and eastwards across the Caucasus, Asia Minor, the Middle East, Middle Asia, Kazakhstan and south Siberia to the Baikal region.

Within Europe, the wood white is unevenly distributed across the Midlands and Southern England, as well as Northern Europe and Ireland. Since the species is currently depleting in size throughout England, it is primarily found in woodland pockets, such as the Haugh and Wigmore Woods of Herefordshire. L. sinapis is also found in Slovakia, the Czech Republic, Sweden, France, Spain and Ireland.

== Habitat ==
The wood white is found in the midlands and southern parts of the United Kingdom, largely in the clearings among woodlands or nearby shrubbery. They can often also be found in areas where there is substantial shelter, such as abandoned railway tracks and cliffs near the sea shore, as well as meadows, forest edges and sparse forests up to 2,500 m above sea level. One of the most consistently populous regions of England in terms of L. sinapis is in Herefordshire, particularly the Haugh Wood and Wigmore Rolls woodlands. The wood white requires habitats with substantial vegetation and shrubbery in order to lay eggs and pupate, however they are very particular about the amount of shade in their habitat. Substantial habitat loss for wood whites occurs as a result of too much shrubbery or shade in their living environments. They select very specific food-plants within these habitats.

== Parental care ==
=== Oviposition ===
The female wood white flies near woodland areas with substantial shrubbery, and lays its eggs on tall food-plants. There are several preferred plants on which L. sinapis have been observed to lay their larva. These include Lotus pedunculatus, Lathyrus pratensis, and Lotus corniculatus. Researchers hypothesize that the height of the plant may influence the number of larva laid there—the taller the plant, the more eggs expected. They tend to select these taller plants, and lay eggs on the underside of leaves in a single row.

=== Host plant learning and selection for egg laying ===
Female wood whites lay the eggs on very specific food-plants (such as Lotus pedunculatus, Lathyrus pratensis, and Lotus corniculatus) that they select through chemoreception via receptors on their feet. They fly low and slowly over the shrubbery and test several plants by landing on them and using their chemoreceptors.

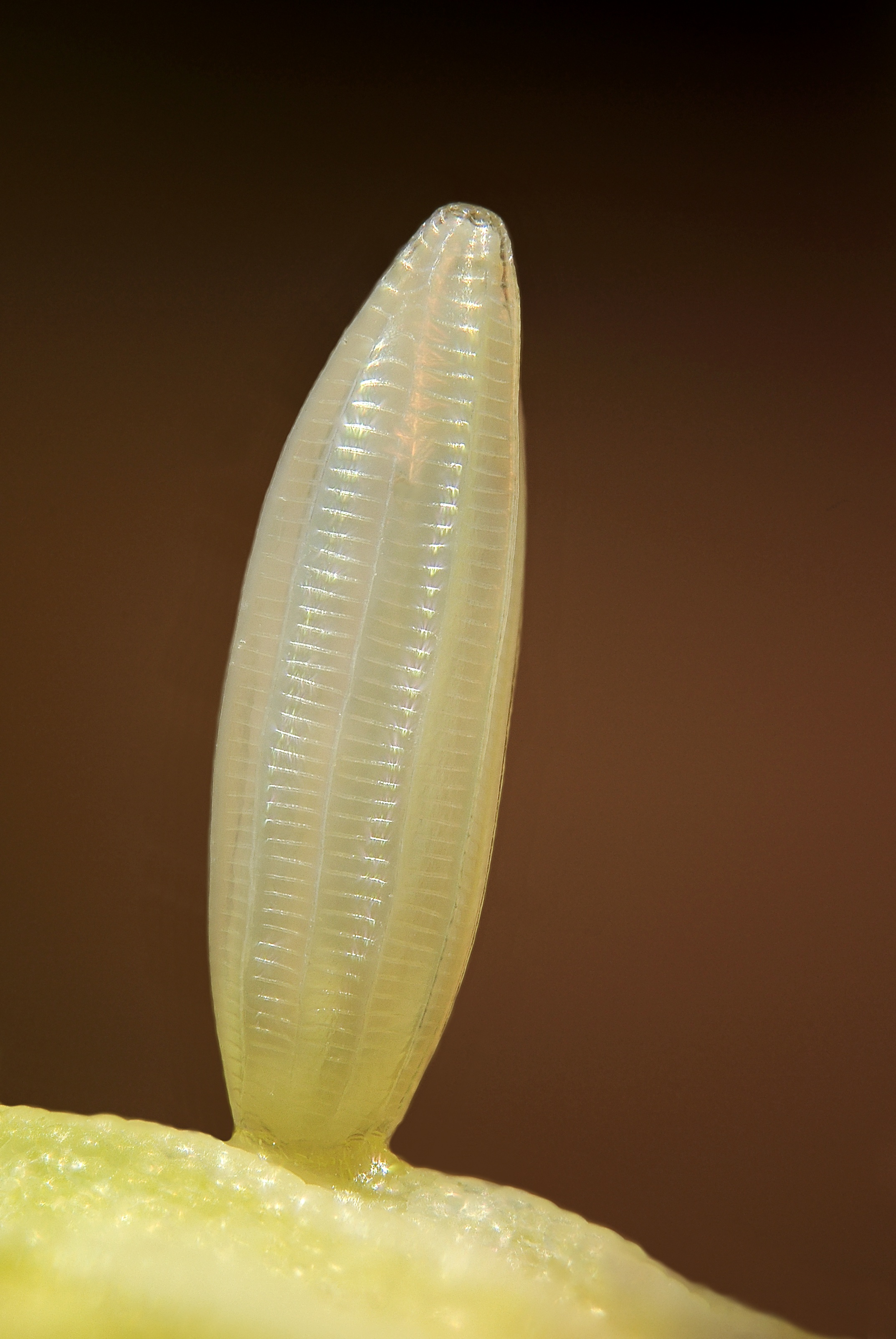
Wood white egg

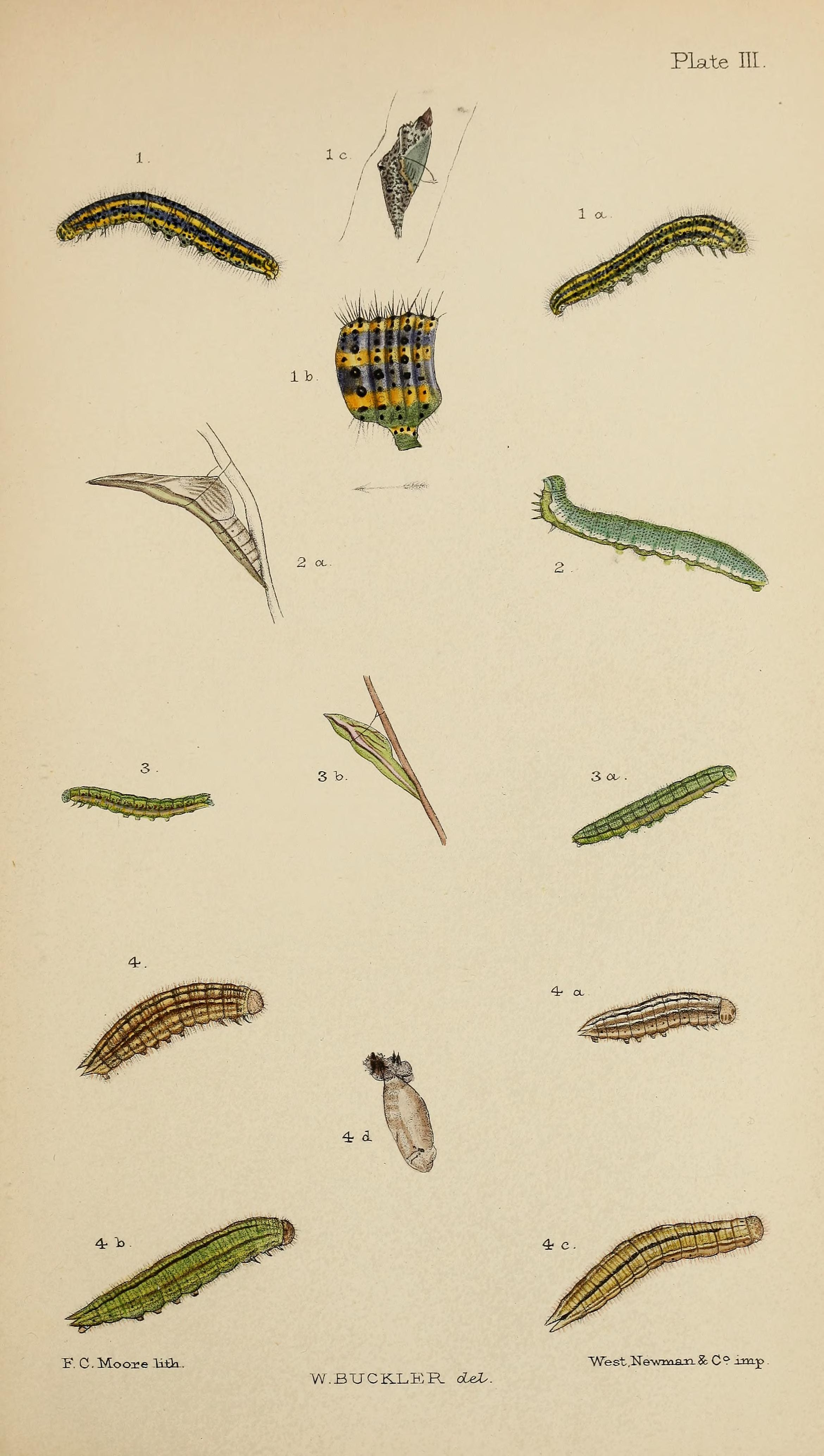
Figs.3 larva after 4th moult 3a adult larva 3b pupa

== Life cycle ==
=== Egg ===
Eggs hatch after 10–20 days, after which the larvae remain on the food plant and feed on its leaves.

=== Caterpillar ===
The development of the larvae is temperature-dependent, with a range of 35–60 days spent developing. There are, on average, four larval instars, which all tend to stay on the food-plant during development, eating the leaves of the plant onto which they hatched. The larvae are green and well camouflaged on their food plant.

=== Pupa ===
When the larvae are ready to pupate, they wander for a variable amount of time (minimum 1 hour, maximum a few days) until they find a location to pupate. The resulting pale green or brown pupae are generally found on grass stems and on rose plants.

=== Adult ===
After pupation, this species re-hatch into full grown wood white butterflies. The species is bivoltine, meaning that two generations hatch per year, during the months of late May through August.

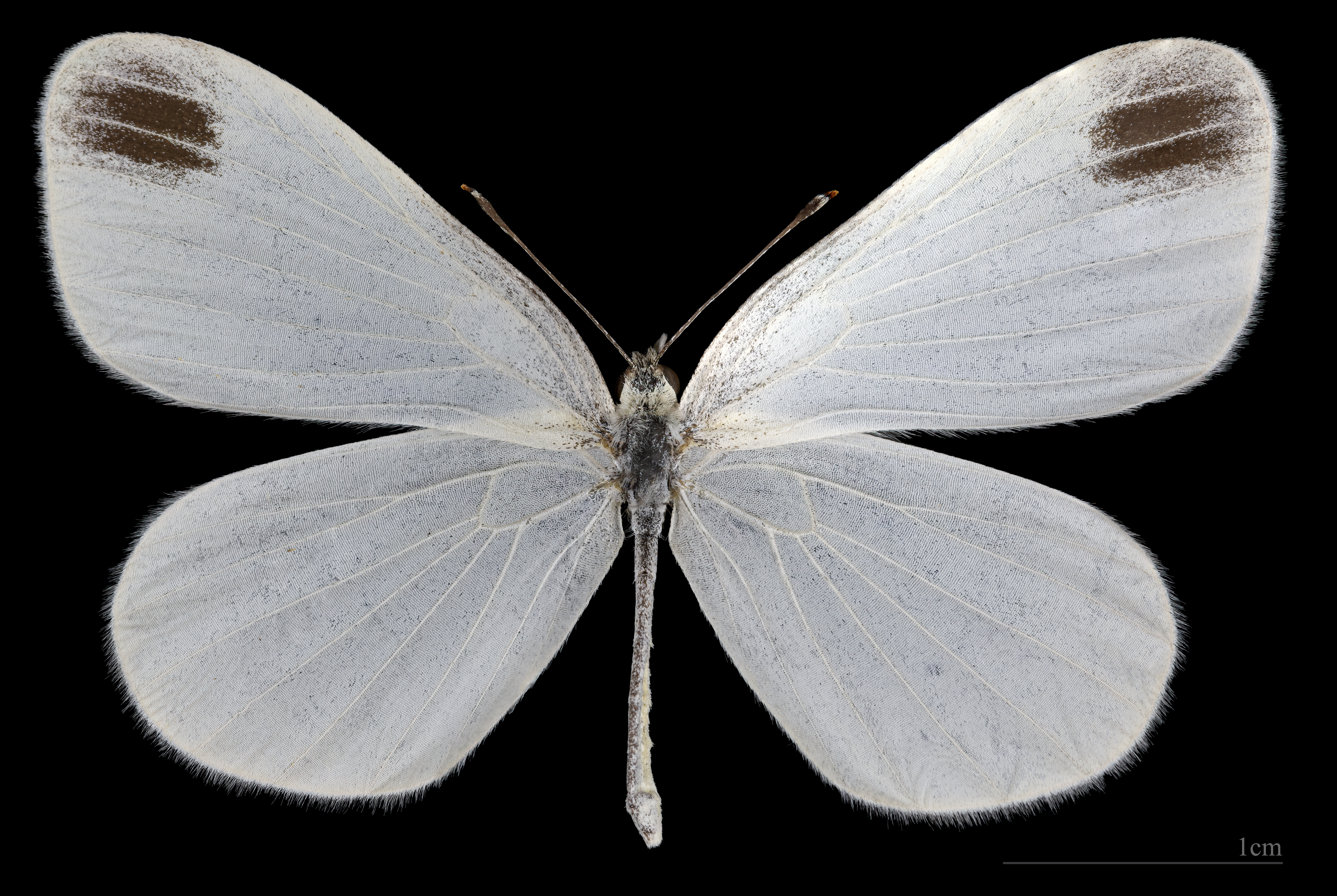
Leptidea sinapis ♂

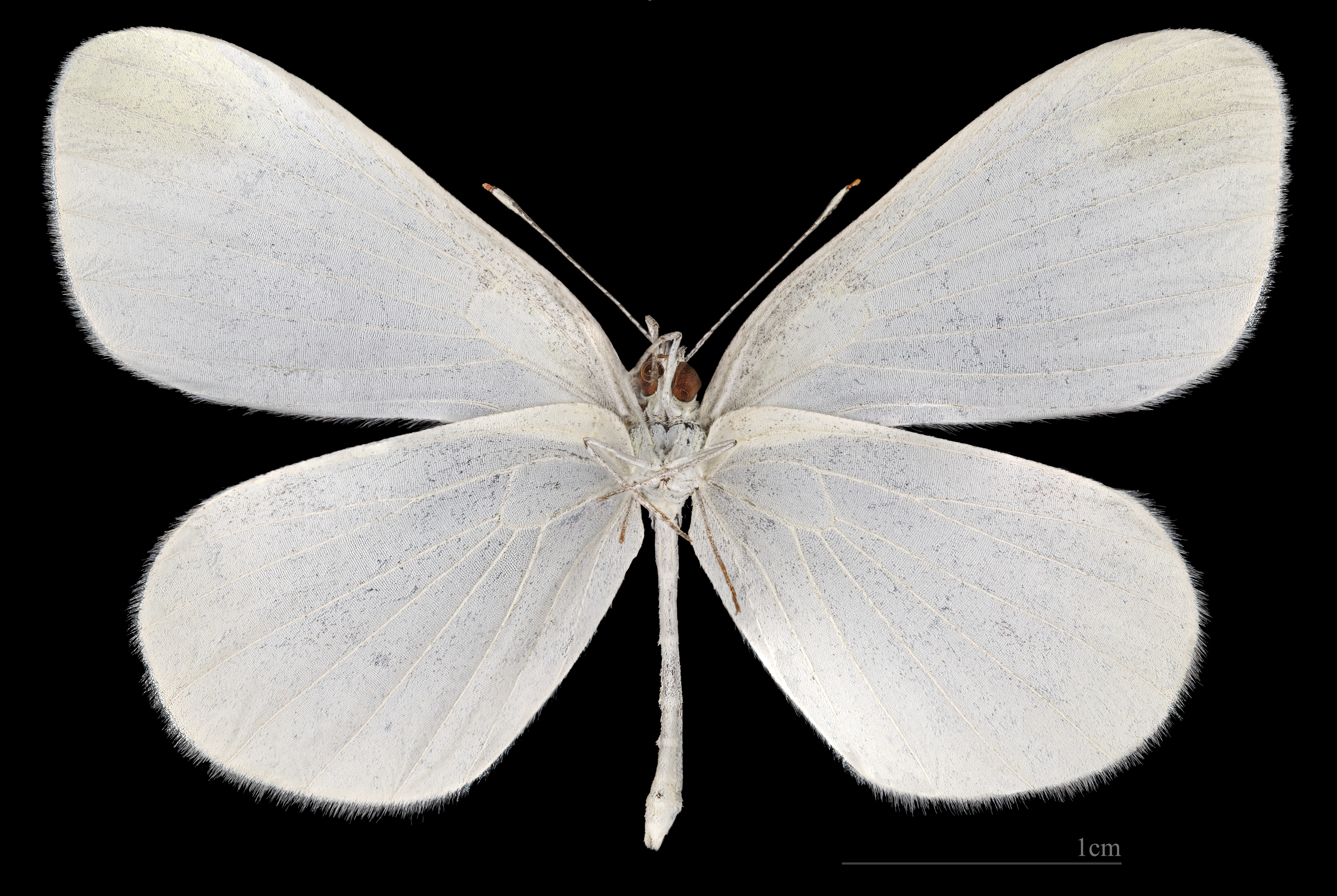
Leptidea sinapis ♂ △

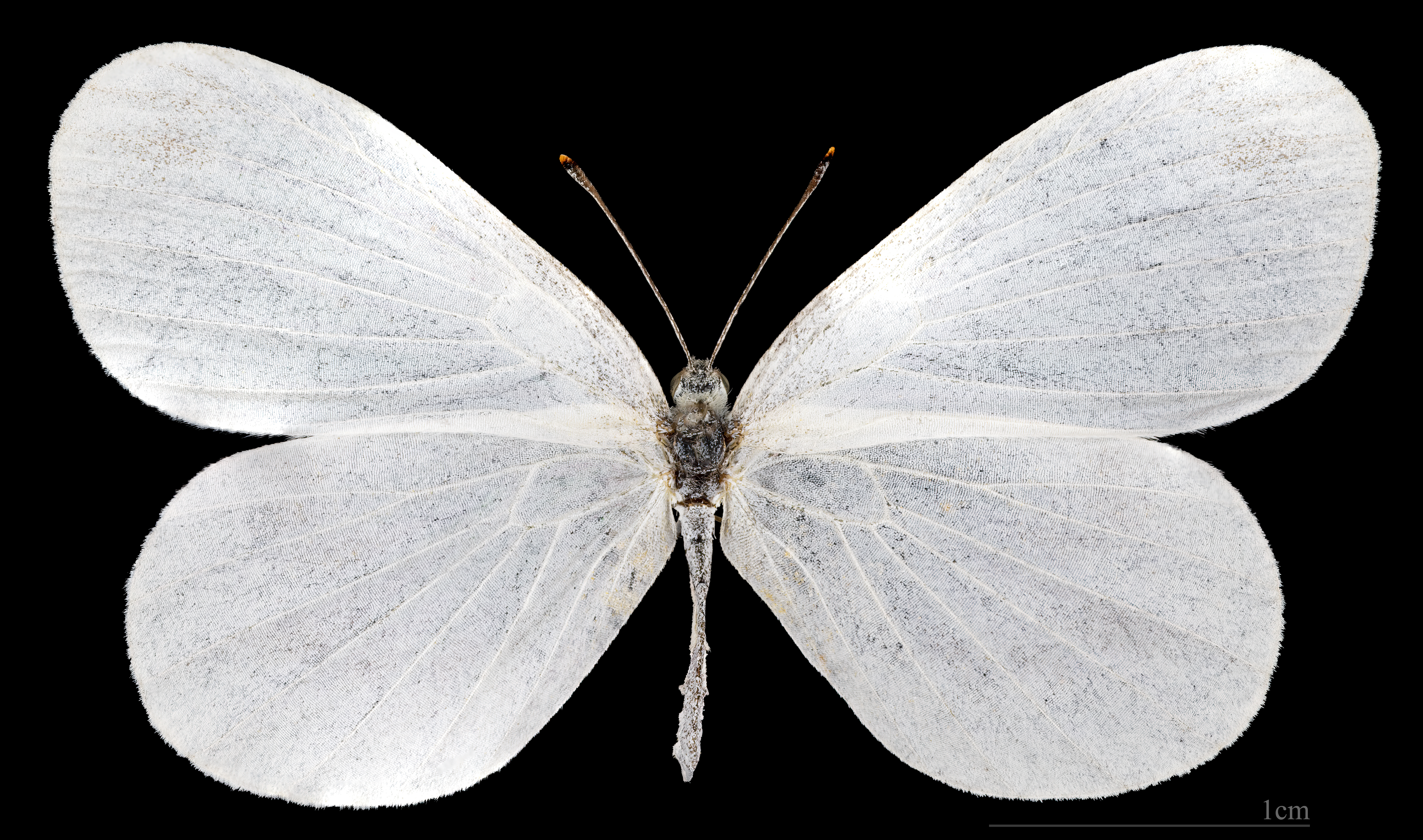
Leptidea sinapis ♀

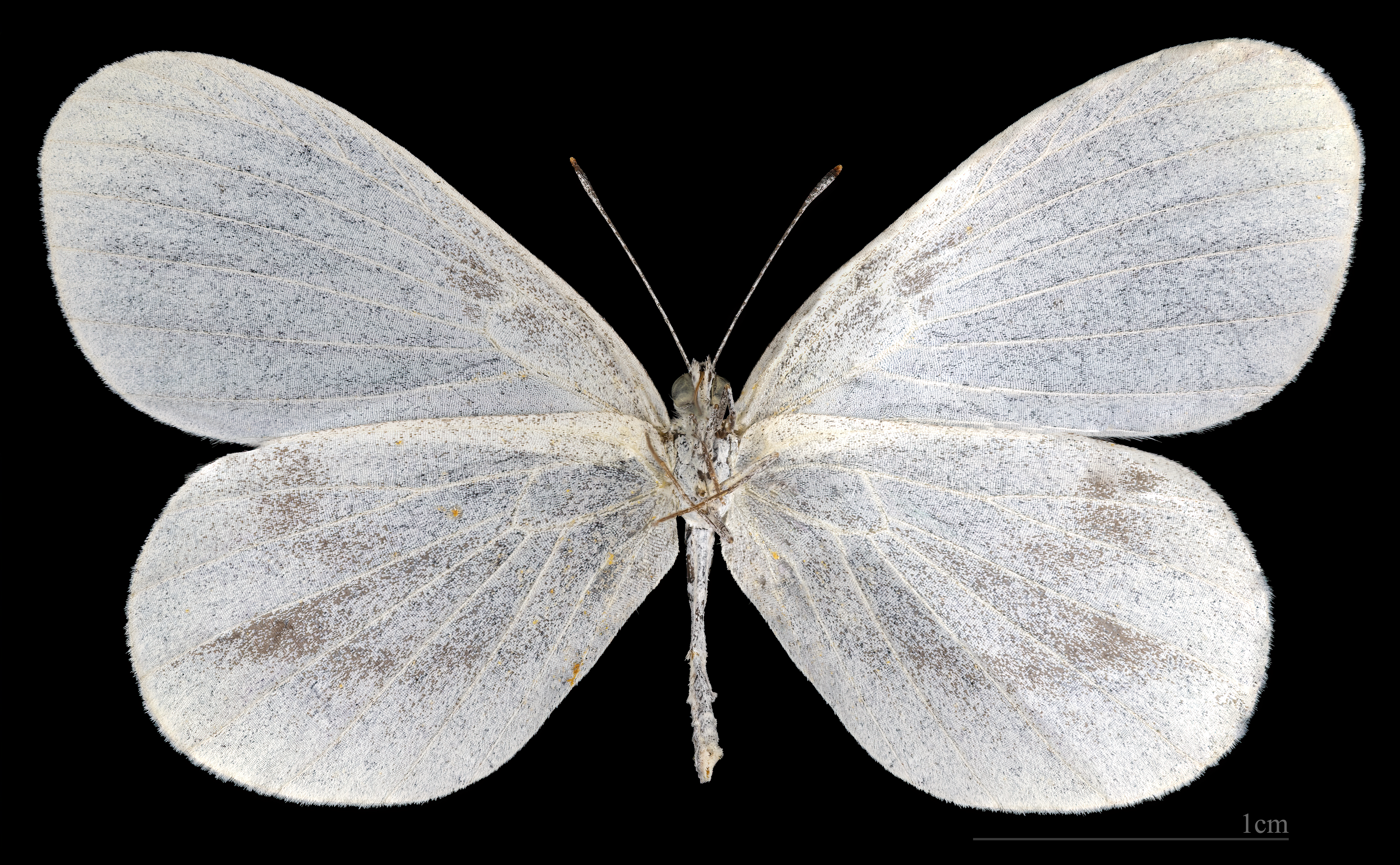
Leptidea sinapis ♀ △

== Genetics ==
=== Speciation ===
Leptidea sinapis is one of three species in a cryptic species complex. The other members of the cryptic species complex are L. reali and L. juvernica. Similar species are L. morsei, L. duponcheli and L. amurensis. The two other related species that have been classified (L. reali and L. juvernica) do not exhibit cross-mating. DNA and mitochondrial studies have shown that the two taxa are definitively different; although they appear the same in wing coloration and external appearance, they can be differentiated by their genitalia. A population genetic study of male L. sinapis, L. reali and L. juvernica individuals showed no evidence for gene flow after divergence. L. reali is found in Italy, Spain, and France, while L. juvernica is found more in England and Ireland, and other Nordic countries. They appear to be niche separated—they utilize and inhabit different habitats. Male members of the two species try and mate with females of both species with equal frequency, but the females only mate with members of their own species. Researchers are attempting to understand the reason for the niche-separation of the two subspecies. The two species tend to lay eggs on the same plants, causing researchers to hypothesize that host-plant selection is not the primary reason for niche-separation and later speciation. The choice of host plant did not affect survival rates of either species to any significant degree, but the most common host plant for both larvae was L. pratensis. A newly hypothesized explanation for this habitat separation, or existence of mosaic habitats is the long courtship rituals that these butterflies have. A female would not want to be subjected to the long courtship ritual only to bear the cost of having hybridized offspring, so there is niche separation to prevent heterospecific mating.

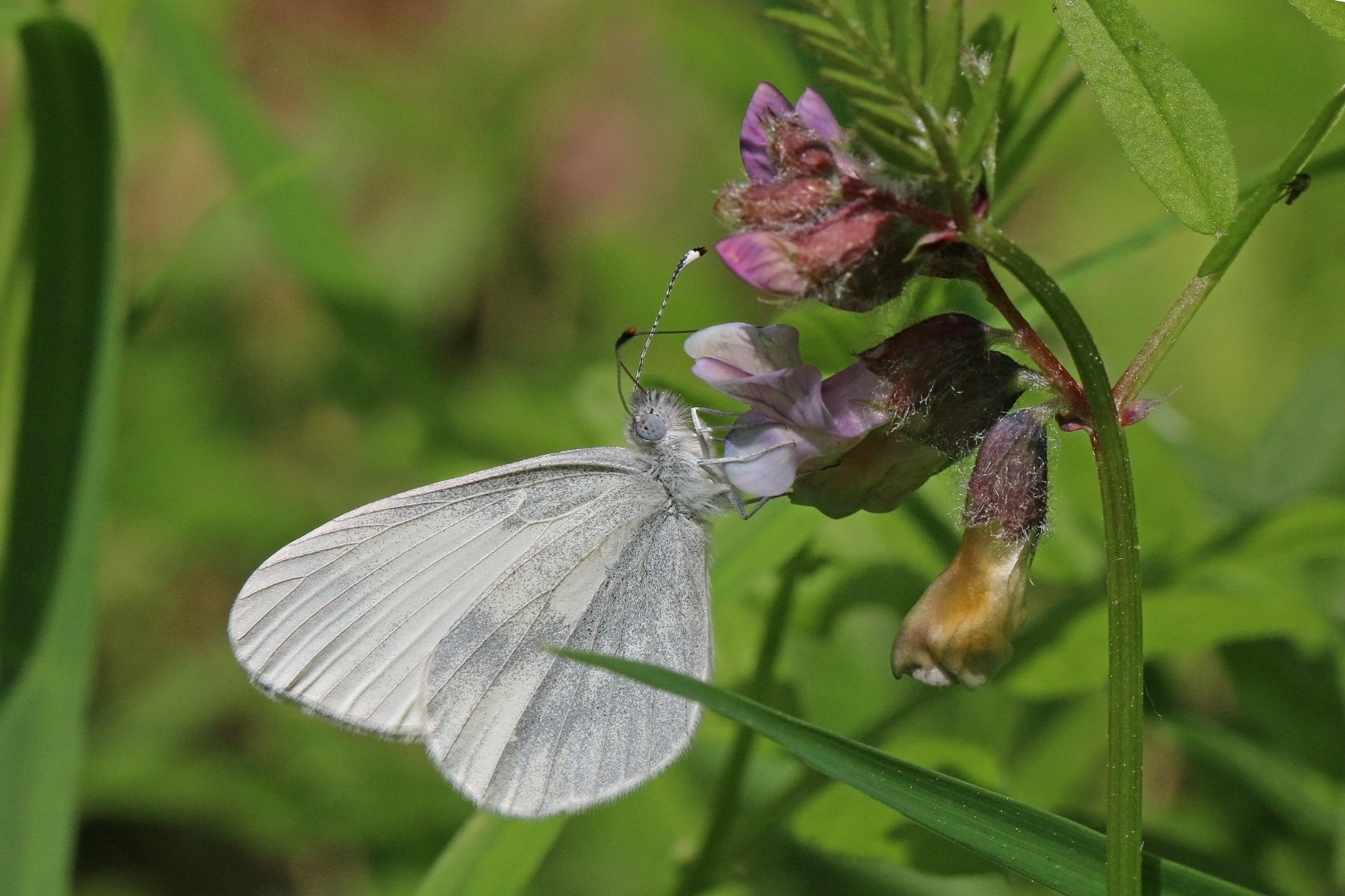
A female wood white

== Migration ==
There is no local or regional migration of the wood white. The wood white is a bivoltine species, meaning that there are two generations of eggs that hatch in one year. The two generations of butterflies emerge and fly in May through June and secondly in July through August. Egg laying, hatching of the larvae, and pupation occur during the winter (over-wintering). Studies about how climate changes during the winter months affect pupation are being conducted to help develop conservation plans.

== Mating ==
=== Female-male interactions ===
==== Mate choice ====
There are two reproductively isolated species of wood white called L. sinapis and L. reali. These two species can mate with each other (heterospecific mating), but it is in their best interest, for the viability and fecundity of their offspring, that they mate only within their species (conspecific mating). Male members of the two species try and court or mate with females of both species with equal frequency, but the females only mate with members of their own species. This female choice has caused the two species to diverge and become reproductively isolated. There is a time and energy cost that the females bear when males of the opposite species attempt to mate with them—this cost has led to females occasionally acquiescing and mating with these males, leading to some degree of between-species hybridization.

==== Courting ====
There is an elaborate courtship ritual between wood whites, initiated by the male. They begin by wagging their head from one side to another, extending their proboscis towards the female. The female, with her antennae pulled back, would be unmoving if already mated and would immediately move their abdomen towards the male if not.

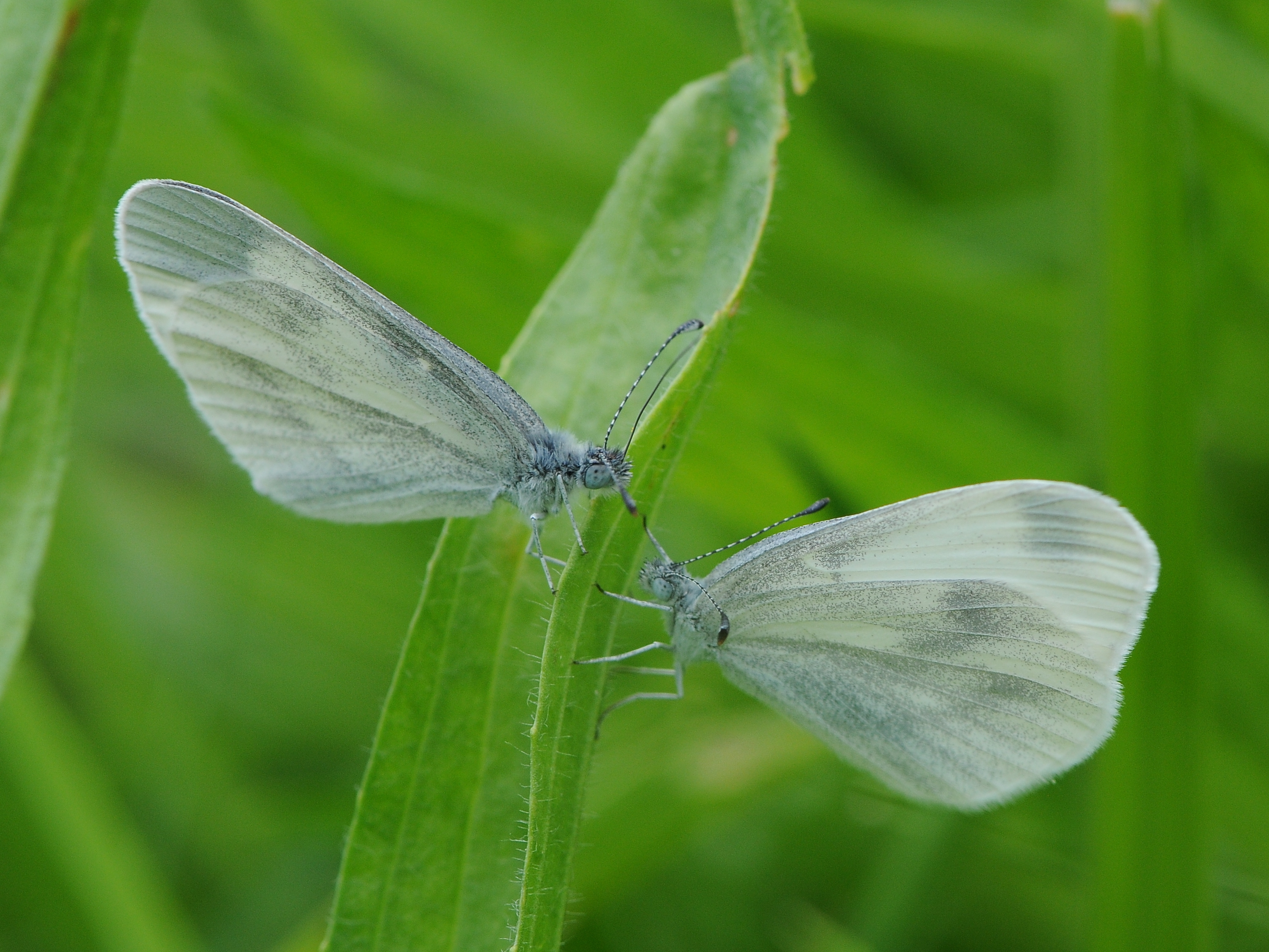
Two wood whites courting

==== Copulation and number of mates ====
Females mate only once in nature, while males can mate several times. This can be explained by the competing pressures that each sex faces. wood white males would need to mate with as many conspecific females as possible to maximize the number of viable offspring, while females benefit from only mating once, since the egg-laying process of choosing the best food-plant on which to oviposit is so time and energy intensive—mating multiple times would not be a good use of resources.

== Physiology ==
=== Flight ===
Adult wood whites fly slowly, and they appear to flutter. Males spend the majority of their lifetime flying low over shrubbery to find possible mates.

=== Appearance ===
Wood white butterflies have white wings, sometimes with small grey or yellowish markings towards the middle or edge of the wing. Males have white-tipped antennae, while females have brown-tipped antennae. They have a 36-44mm wingspan.

== As parasites ==
It had been long held that butterfly species feeding on nectar had served as pollinator vectors, but the L. sinapis demonstrates that this is not always the case. An analysis of the relationship between the Phlox-Coliasis pollination system and the L. sinapis which feeds on the nectar, displays that the pollination efficiency is around 1%, extremely low for the need to successfully pollinate the host population. Thus, rather than being considered a mutualistic relationship, the L. sinapis is considered a parasite to the flowers from which they feed.

== Threats ==
=== Predators ===
Predators of the wood white eggs are largely unknown, but lead to 90-98% of all egg deaths.

=== Parasites ===
Wasps in the family Trichogrammatidae parasitize the wood white eggs and account for only a small percentage of egg death. The larvae are parasitized by Cotesia vitripennis and Cotesia anchisiades, which are two braconid wasp species.

=== Habitat fluctuations ===
Rapid changes in shade (tree-cover, buildings, etc.) in the woodlands where the butterflies lay their eggs and moist or colder weather during ovipositing season contribute to the lower quantities of adult wood whites during the months of June through August.

== Conservation ==
=== Habitat loss ===
The wood white butterfly was named a UK BAP Priority Species candidate in 2005, due to the substantial drop in population size in the last quarter century. There are several habitat-related reasons behind the drop in wood white butterfly. Researchers hypothesize that this could be due to the changing treatment of woodland areas, including over-planting of trees. Many of the woodlands where wood whites colonize were replanted in the last 50 years, leading to a large increase in the amount of shade over the woodland rides and shrubbery. Very little is understood about how to upkeep woodland areas so that they are sufficient for wood white colonization; this is the main area of research on conversation presently.

=== Conservation efforts ===
There have been efforts to recolonize areas of the United Kingdom as part of a 10-year plan to reintroduce more wood whites into the area. This recolonization involves maintaining woodland ride areas to minimize loss of vegetation and dispersing the butterflies strategically into woodland ride areas in Britain. Another major point of interest for the conservation effort is to examine how weather and climate change, particularly in the winter, affects pupation, since this process largely takes place over winter (called overwintering of the pupae).

== See also ==
- List of butterflies of Great Britain
