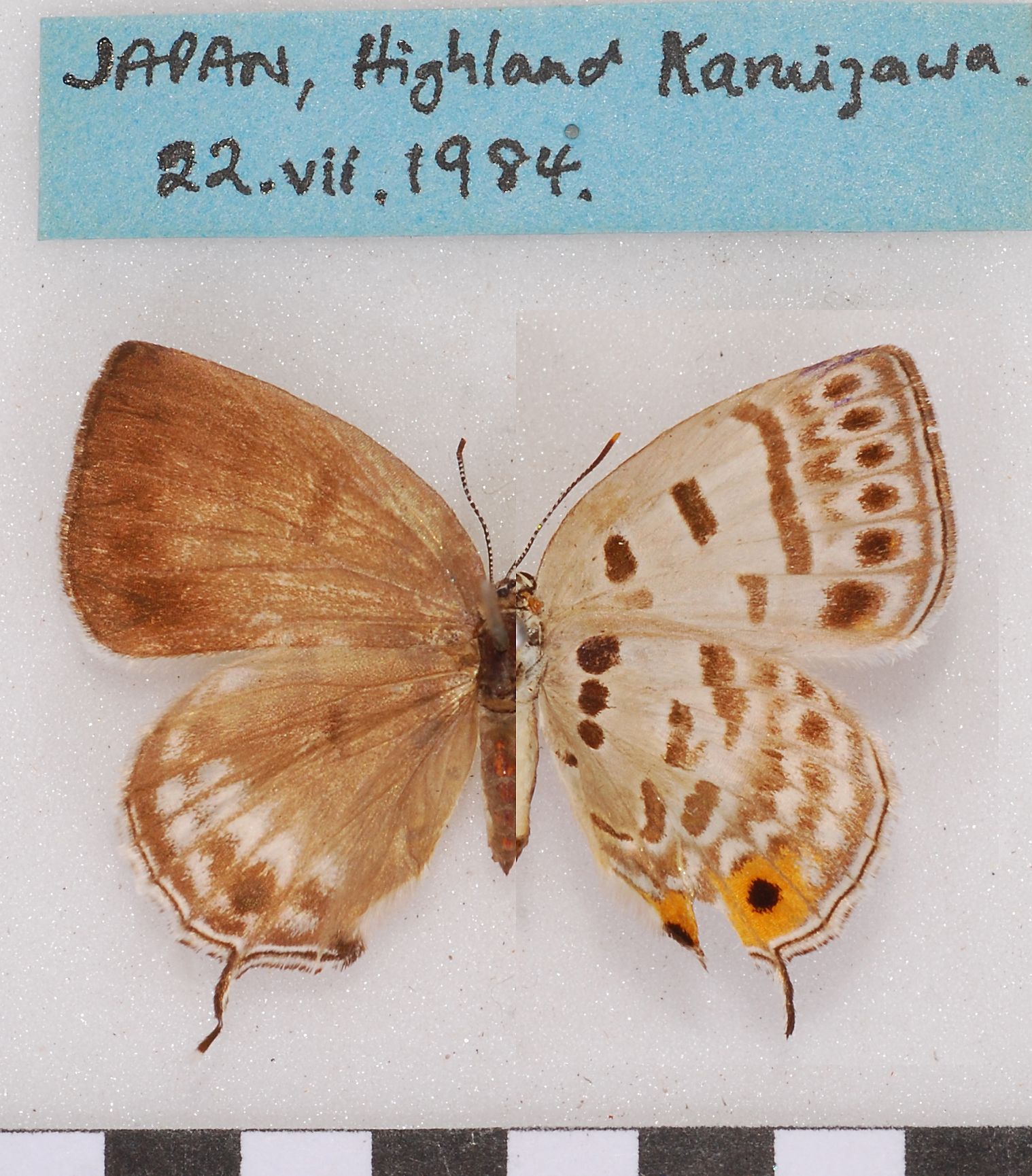
- Antigius butleri, female, set specimen, Japan, Alan Cassidy photo
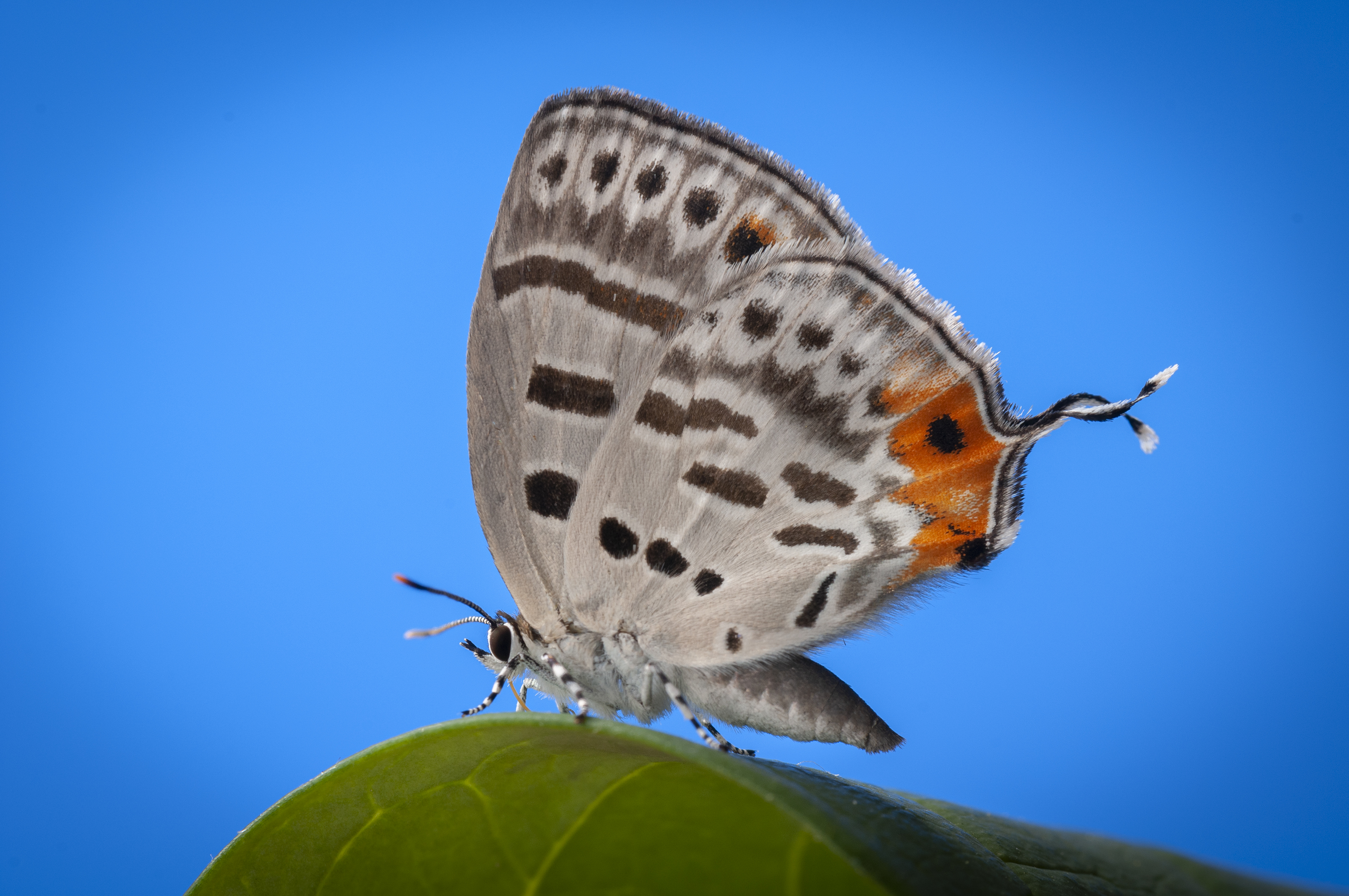
- Antigius butleri, Adult, South Korea

Scientific classification
- Kingdom: Animalia
- Phylum: Arthropoda
- Clade: Pancrustacea
- Class: Insecta
- Order: Lepidoptera
- Family: Lycaenidae
- Genus: Antigius
- Species: A. butleri

Binomial name
- Antigius butleri (Fenton, 1882)

= Antigius butleri =

Species of butterfly

Antigius butleri is a small butterfly found in the East Palearctic (Amur, Korea, North China) that belongs to the lycaenids or blues family.

== Description from Seitz ==
Above like A. attilia, but the pale spots on the hindwing, which in attilia are only found in the female, occur in the present species in both sexes, although they are duller in the male than in the female. The characteristic markings of the underside are slightly visible above and are more irregularly arranged beneath, especially on the hindwing, the dark discal band moreover being separated into an irregular row of spots; thus butleri forms a kind of link between enthea and ottilia. — Amurland and North Japan, apparently rare everywhere.

== Subspecies ==
- Antigius butleri butleri Japan (Hokkaido)
- Antigius butleri oberthueri (Staudinger, 1887) continental part, Ussuri, Priamurye, Primorye,
- Antigius butleri miniakonga (Yoshino, 1999) Sichuan

== See also ==
- List of butterflies of Russia
