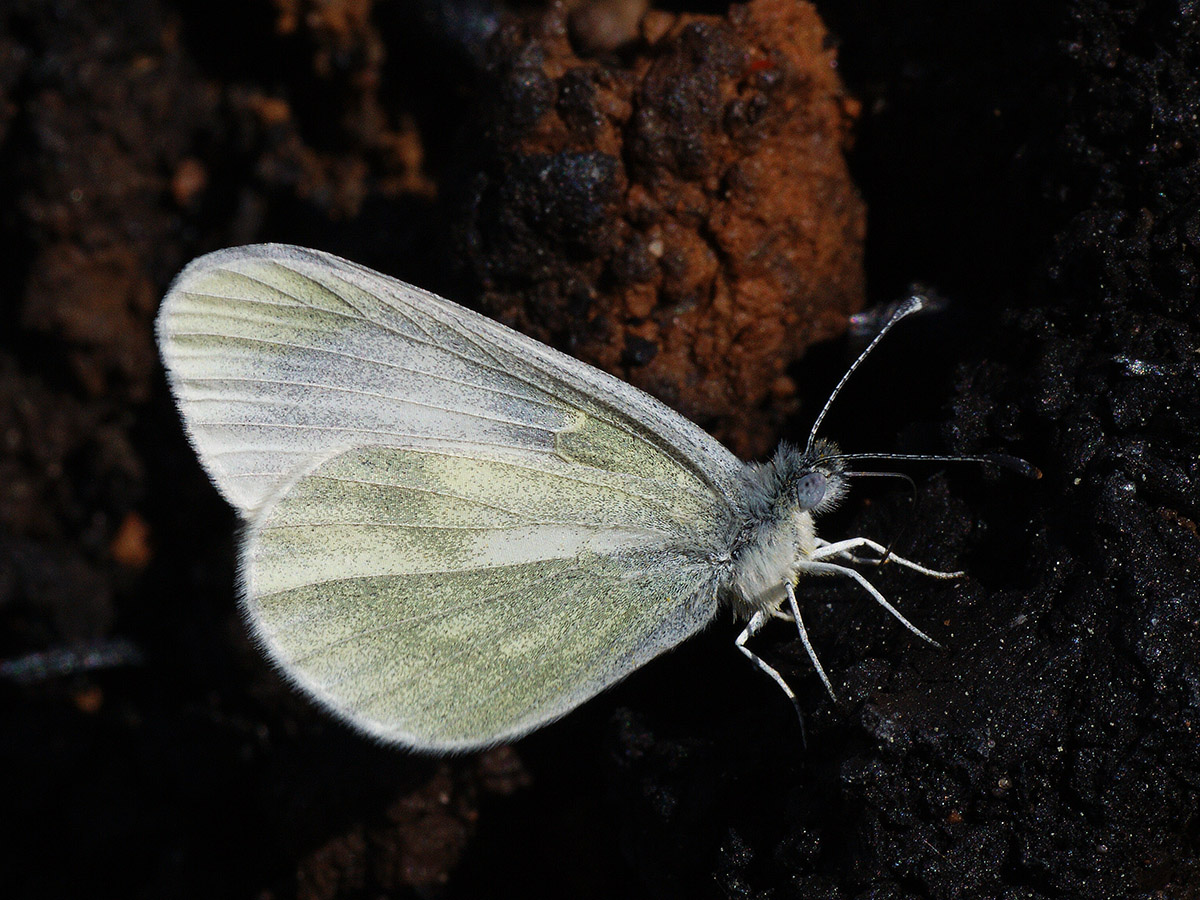

Scientific classification
- Kingdom: Animalia
- Phylum: Arthropoda
- Class: Insecta
- Order: Lepidoptera
- Family: Pieridae
- Genus: Leptidea
- Species: L. reali

Binomial name
- Leptidea reali Reissinger 1989

= Leptidea reali =

Réal's wood white

Species of butterfly

Leptidea reali, the Réal's wood white, is a butterfly of the family Pieridae.

== Taxonomy ==
A 2011 study using karyotype analysis and analysis of mitochondrial nuclear DNA markers concluded that Leptidea reali is one of three members of a cryptic species complex which also includes Leptidea sinapis and a new species Leptidea juvernica.

== Distribution ==
Leptidea reali is known to occur in Spain, Italy and southern France. L. reali was formerly thought to occur in Ireland but this population is now known to be L. juvernica. Since the three species look and behave similarly, further research is needed to discover their true distribution; indeed on the continent the current known distribution of L. reali is suspiciously patchy. L. reali can be separated from L. sinapis by analysis of the male genital morphology, but it cannot be reliably separated this way from L. juvernica.

Field lepidopterists have reported behavioural differences between L. reali and L. sinapis with Réal's being described as a stronger flier and with a preference for more open habitats.

== Life cycle and food plants ==
The life cycle, flight period and food plants appear at present to be similar to the wood white.
