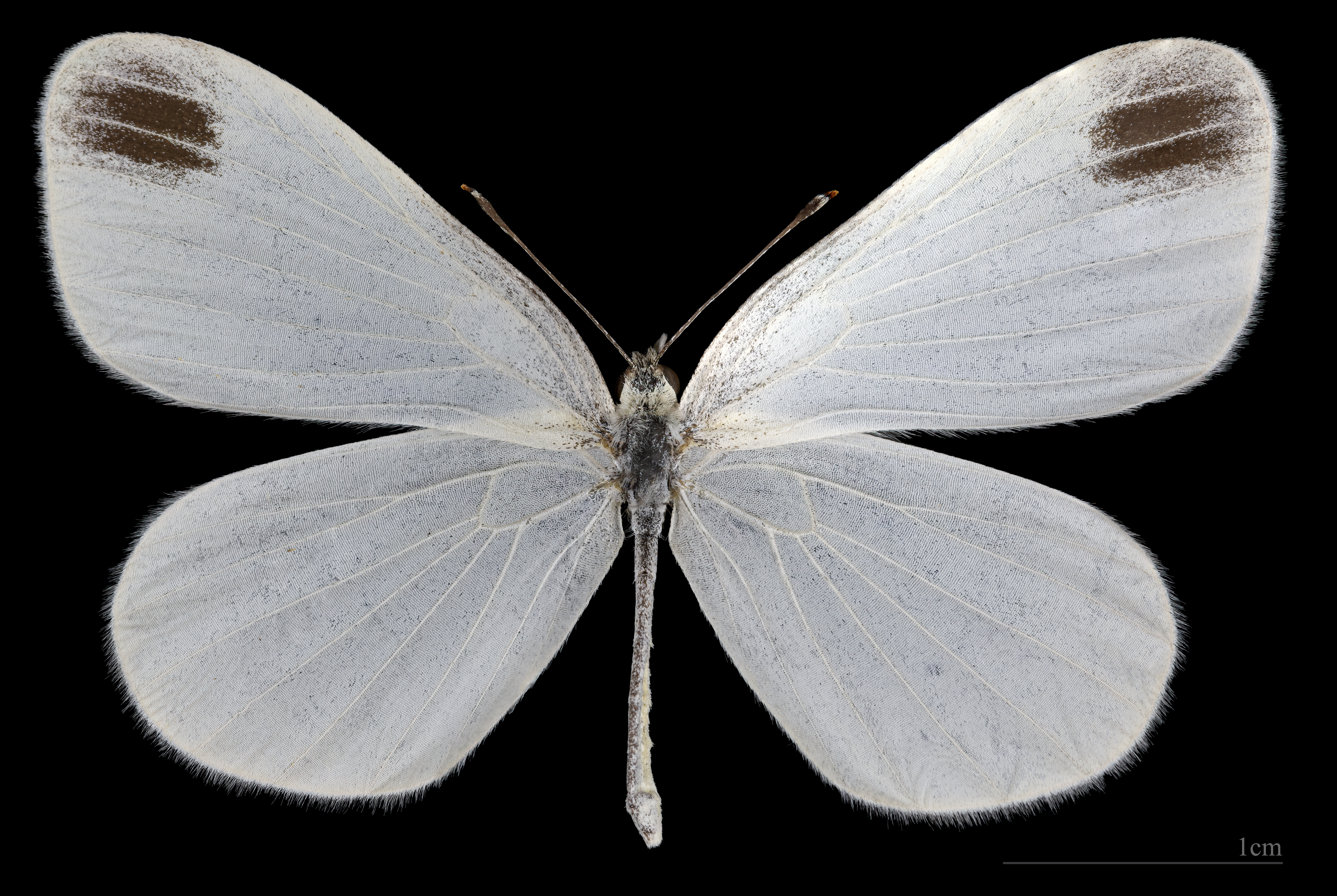
- Wood white, Leptidea sinapis

Scientific classification
- Domain: Eukaryota
- Kingdom: Animalia
- Phylum: Arthropoda
- Class: Insecta
- Order: Lepidoptera
- Family: Pieridae
- Subfamily: Dismorphiinae
- Genus: Leptidea; Billberg, 1820

Species
- See text

Synonyms
- Leucophasia Stephens, 1827

= Leptidea =

Butterfly genus in family Pieridae

Leptidea is a genus of butterflies of family Pieridae, the whites and yellows. They live in Europe and Asia.

The genus contains the following species:

- Leptidea amurensis Ménétriés, 1859
- Leptidea darvazensis Bolshakov, 2004 Central Asian mountains
- Leptidea descimoni Mazel, 2004 Kyrgyzstan
- Leptidea duponcheli (Staudinger, 1871) – eastern wood white – South Europe, Asia Minor, Balkans, Iran
- Leptidea gigantea (Leech, 1890) China
- Leptidea juvernica stat. nov. – cryptic wood white
- Leptidea lactea Lorkovic, 1950 Tapaischan, China
- Leptidea morsei Fenton, [1882]
- Leptidea reali Reissinger, [1990] – Real's wood white
- Leptidea serrata Lee, 1955 China
- Leptidea sinapis (Linnaeus, 1758) – wood white
- Leptidea yunnanica Koiwaya, 1996 China
