= Montague Arthur Fenton =

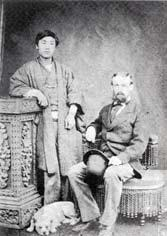
Fenton and his student Tanakadate Aikitsu, circa 1877

Montague Arthur Fenton (29 June 1850 in Doncaster, England – 21 March 1937 in Oakland City, California) was an English entomologist who collected insects throughout Japan.

Fenton was an English language teacher at Tokyo Foreign Language School from 1874 to 1880 at the beginning of the Meiji epoch. Returning to England, he graduated from St. John's College, Cambridge and then worked as an Inspector of Technical Colleges & Schools. In 1889 he married Harriette Eleanor Binny and had a daughter, Sylvia Ermyntrude in 1893. In 1924 or so, Fenton and his wife went to California, where their married daughter then lived. The pierid Leptidea morsei, known as Fenton's wood white, was described and named by him. The types of Lepidoptera described by Fenton are held by the Natural History Museum, London (via his collaborator Arthur Gardiner Butler) who he honoured in the name Antigius butleri.

== Works ==
- Arthur G. Butler, 1881 On Butterflies from Japan; with which are incorporated Notes and Descriptions of new Species by Montague Fenton. Proceedings of the Zoological Society of London (1881):846-856
