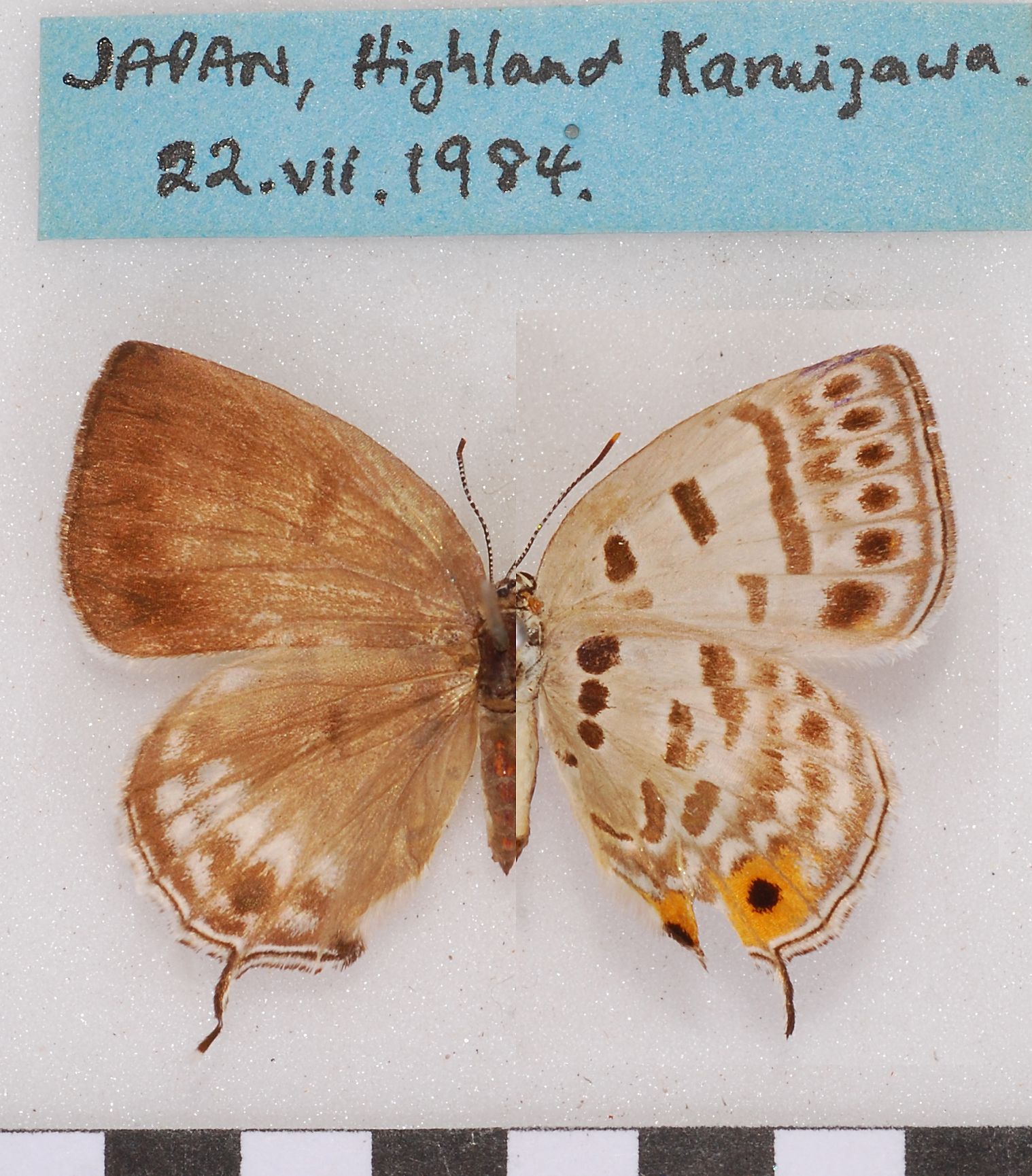
- Antigius butleri

Scientific classification
- Kingdom: Animalia
- Phylum: Arthropoda
- Clade: Pancrustacea
- Class: Insecta
- Order: Lepidoptera
- Family: Lycaenidae
- Tribe: Theclini
- Genus: Antigius; Sibatani & Ito, 1942

= Antigius =

Butterfly genus in family Lycaenidae

Antigius is a genus of butterflies in the family Lycaenidae. The species of this genus are found in the eastern Palearctic realm (China, Korea, Japan, and the Russian Far East), as well as Taiwan and Myanmar.

== Species ==
- Antigius attilia (Bremer, 1861)
- Antigius butleri (Fenton, 1881)
- Antigius cheni Koiwaya, 2004
- Antigius jinpingi Hsu, 2009
- Antigius shizuyai Koiwaya, 2002
