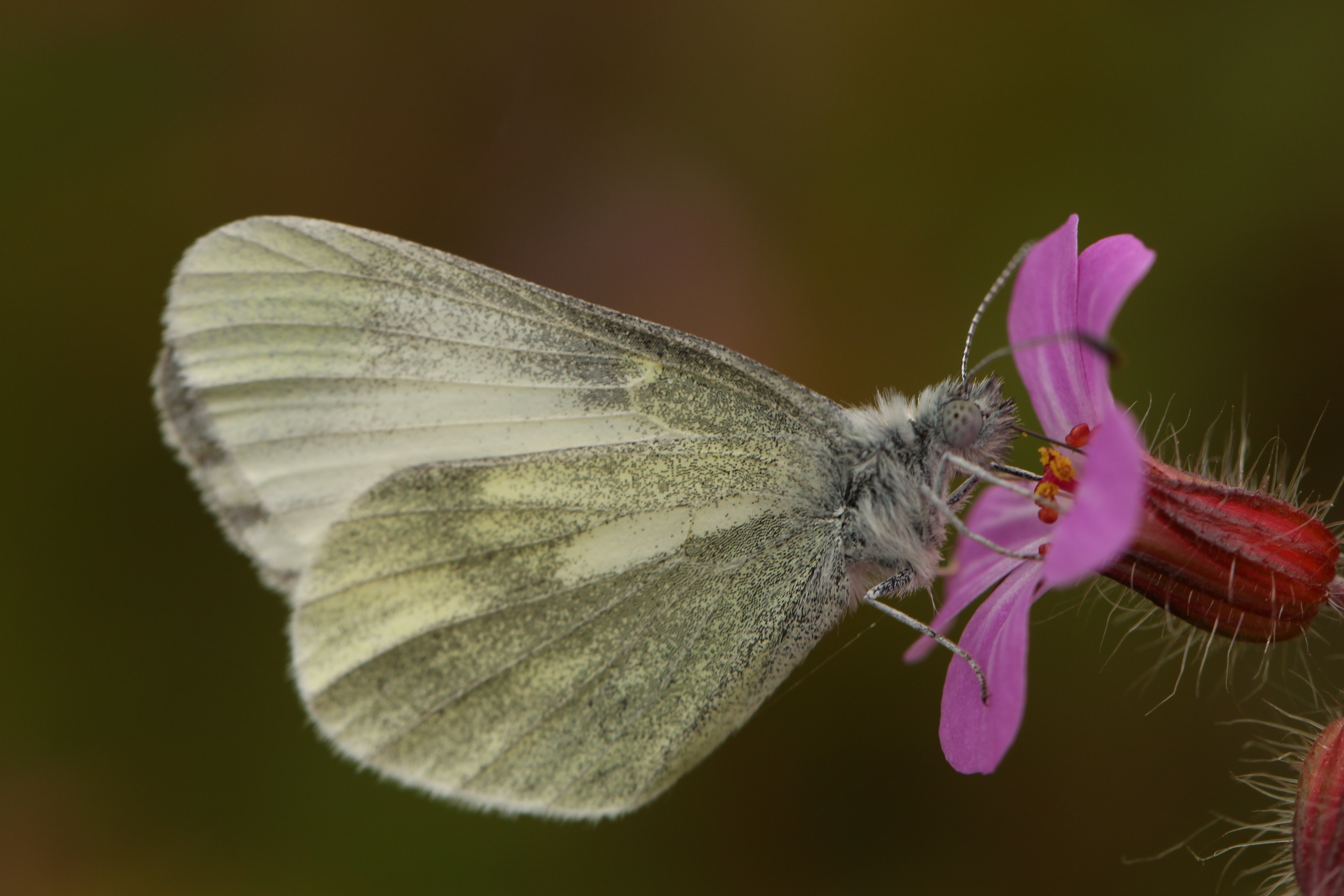

Scientific classification
- Kingdom: Animalia
- Phylum: Arthropoda
- Clade: Pancrustacea
- Class: Insecta
- Order: Lepidoptera
- Family: Pieridae
- Genus: Leptidea
- Species: L. juvernica

Binomial name
- Leptidea juvernica Williams 1946

= Leptidea juvernica =

Cryptic wood white

Species of butterfly

Leptidea juvernica, the Cryptic wood white, is a butterfly in the family Pieridae.

== Taxonomy ==
A 2011 study using karyotype analysis and analysis of mitochondrial nuclear DNA markers concluded that the complex of cryptic species that includes Leptidea sinapis and Leptidea reali also included a third, new species Leptidea juvernica.

== Distribution ==
L. juvernica ranges from Ireland and France in the west to Kazakhstan in the east. The population in Ireland was formerly thought to be Leptidea reali, but is now known to be L. juvernica.

== Appearance ==
It has been noted that specimens of L. juvernica from Ireland, originally thought to be L. sinapis, had a noticeably stronger green tinge.

== Gallery ==
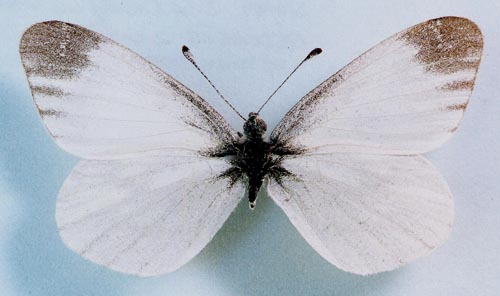
Male specimen of L. juvernica from Ireland. The end of the abdomen has been removed to allow correct identification through the preparation of a genitalia mount.

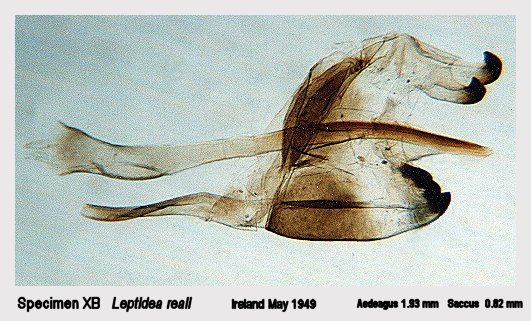
Genitalia of a male specimen of L. juvernica from Ireland, under a microscope. The measurements shown beneath are diagnostic for the separation from L. sinapis.
