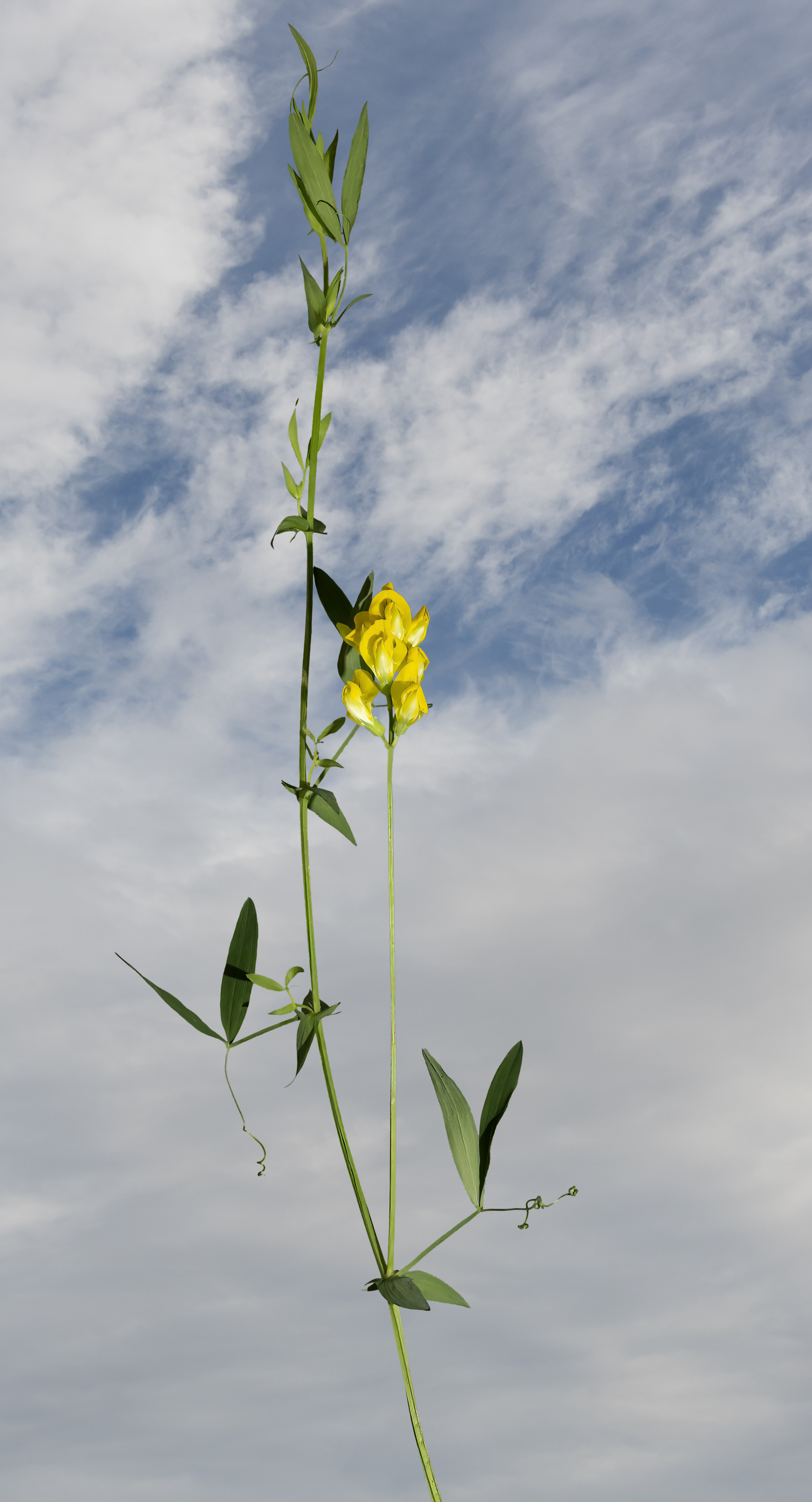

Conservation status
- Least Concern (IUCN 3.1)

Scientific classification
- Kingdom: Plantae
- Clade: Tracheophytes
- Clade: Angiosperms
- Clade: Eudicots
- Clade: Rosids
- Order: Fabales
- Family: Fabaceae
- Subfamily: Faboideae
- Genus: Lathyrus
- Species: L. pratensis

Binomial name
- Lathyrus pratensis L.

= Lathyrus pratensis =

Meadow vetchling

Species of legume

Lathyrus pratensis or meadow vetchling, yellow pea, meadow pea and meadow pea-vine, is a perennial legume that grows to 1.2 m in height.

The hermaphrodite flowers are pollinated by bees. As a perennial, this plant reproduces itself over many years, spreading out from the point it was introduced, especially in damp grassy areas. This plant has been propagated in the past as animal fodder.

Lathyrus pratensis is also a host plant for ovipositioning of the wood white butterfly (Leptidea sinapis).

== Description ==
Meadow vetchling is a perennial plant with a limp, unwinged stem that grows to 25 to 60 cm (10 to 24 in) and is erect and hairy. The leaves are alternate with short stalks and large stipules. The leaf blades are pinnate with a single pair of broad lanceolate leaflets with blunt tips, entire margins and a terminal unbranched tendril. The inflorescence has a long stem and a cluster of five to twelve yellow flowers, each 10 to 16 mm (0.4 to 0.6 in) long. These have five sepals and five petals and are irregular. The uppermost petal is known as the "standard", the lateral two as the "wings" and the lowest two are joined to form the "keel". There are ten stamens and a single carpel. The fruit is a long black pod. This plant flowers from June to August.

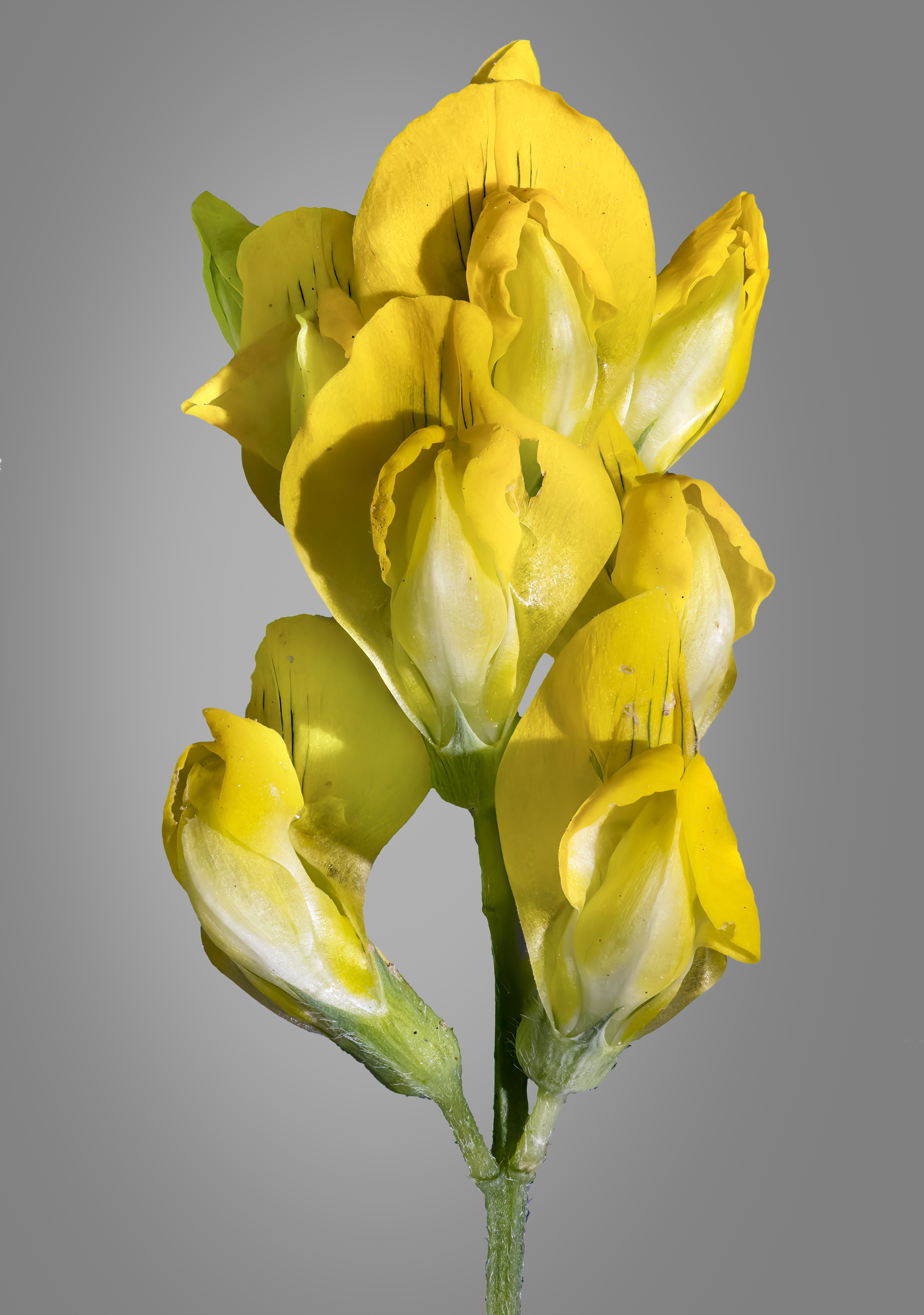
Inflorescence

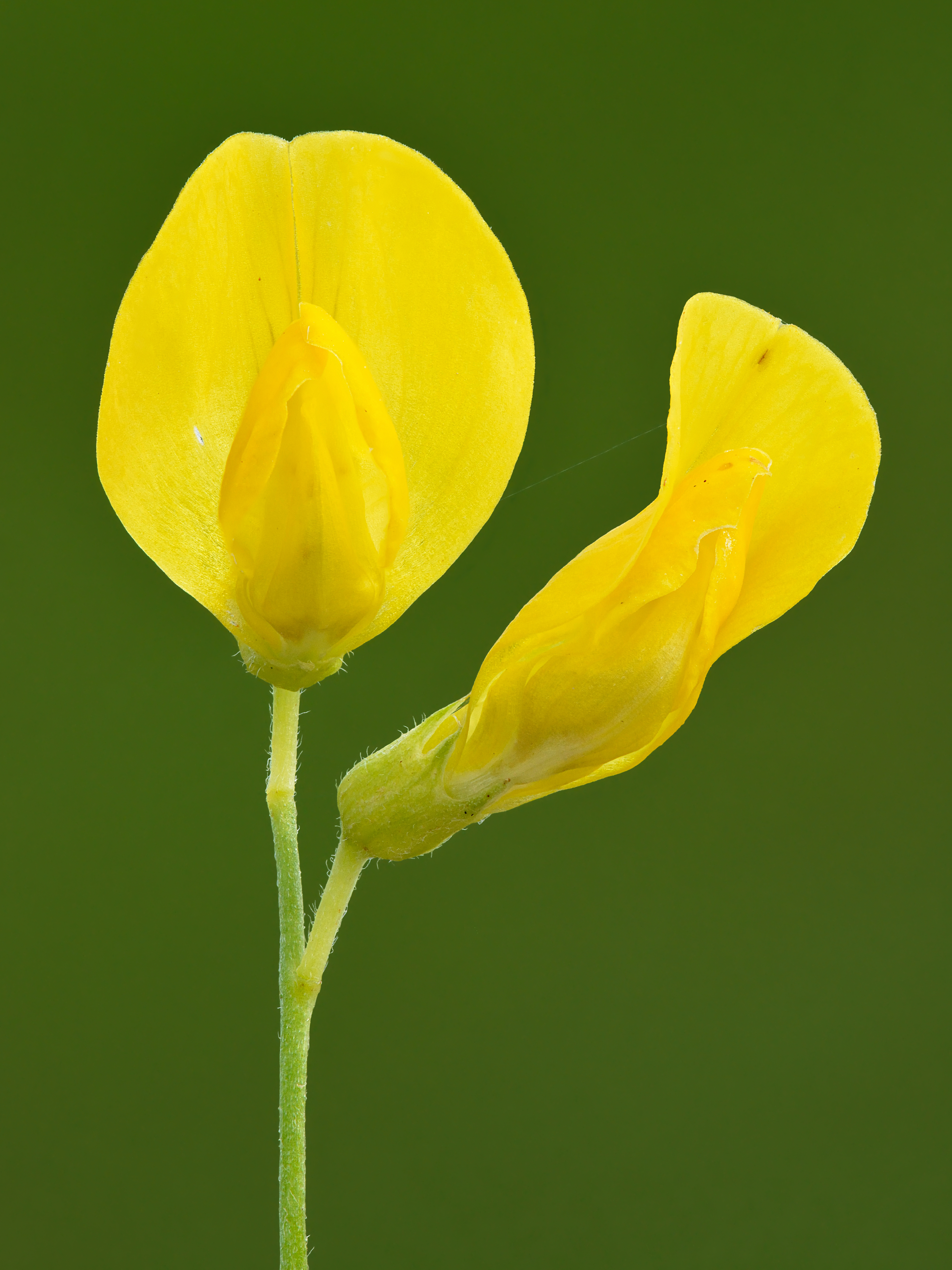
A close-up of the flowers

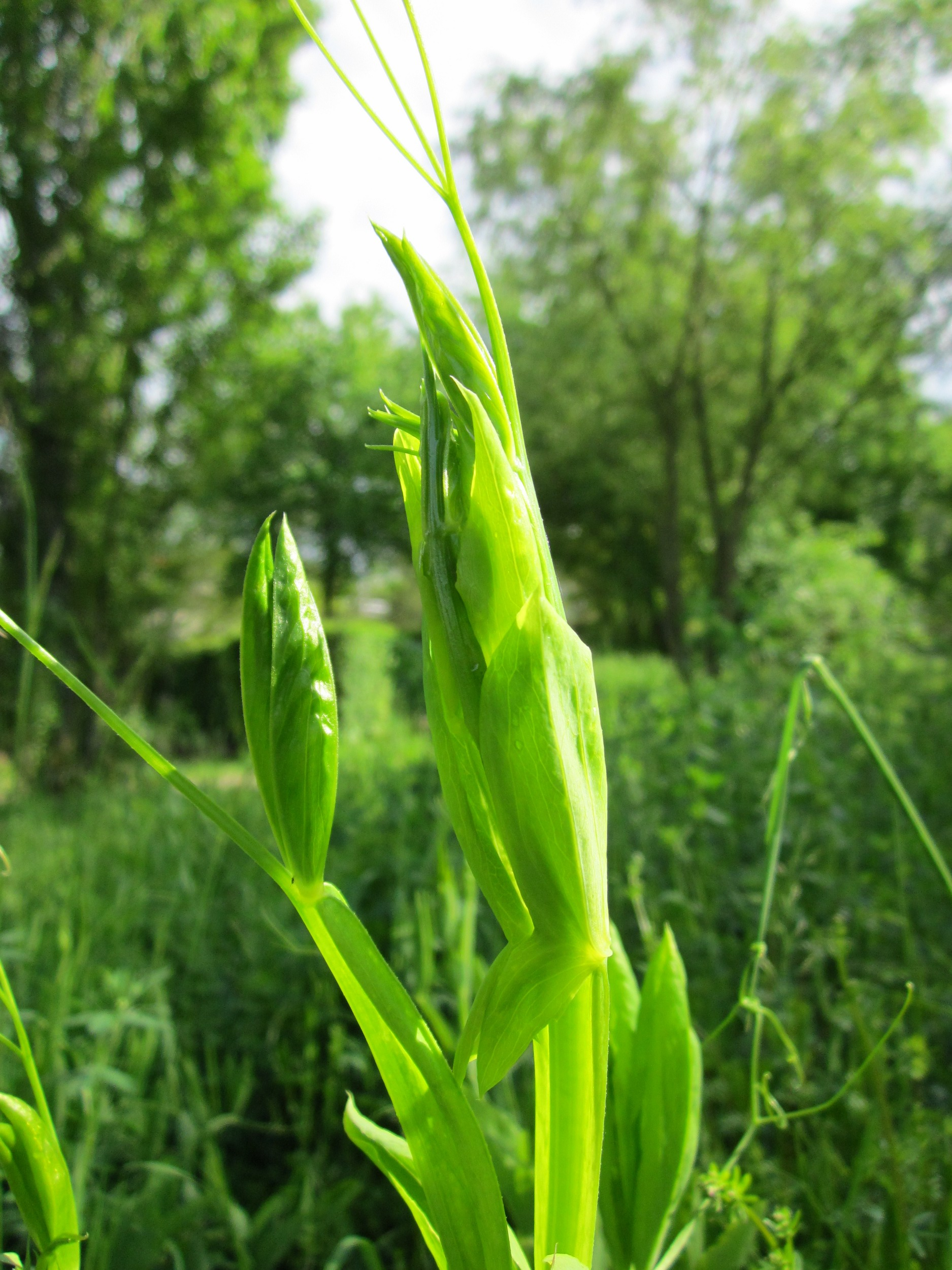
Vigorous green growth

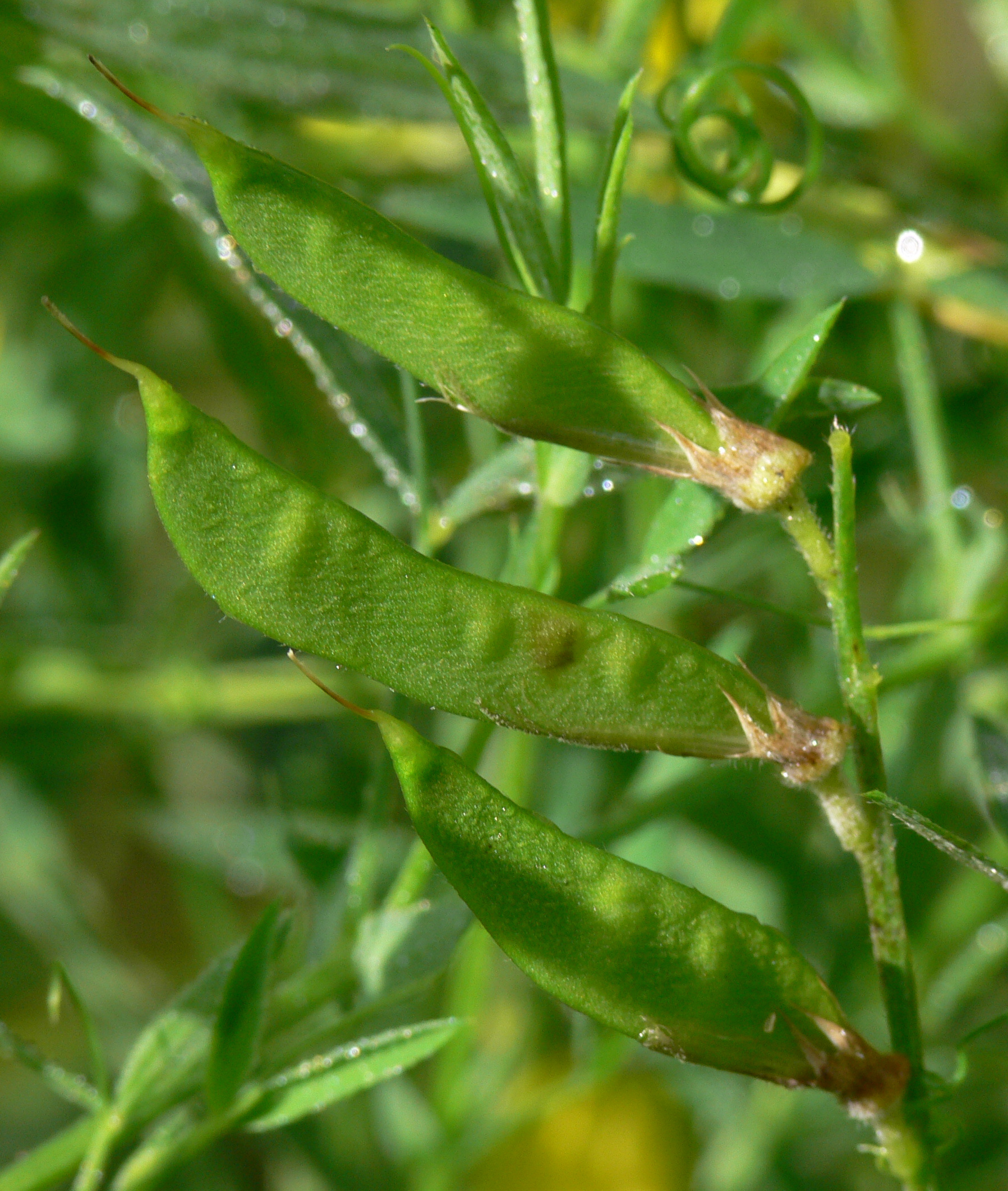
Young fruit

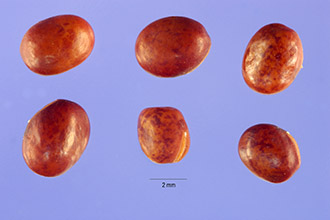
Seeds

== Distribution and habitat ==
Meadow vetchling is native to Europe and Asia, but has been introduced to other parts of the world. In the United States, this plant is found primarily in the northwestern states of Oregon and Alaska. Its typical habitat is rough grassy places, broad-leaved woodland, forest margins, hedgerows and banks where it uses its tendrils to clamber over other vegetation.
