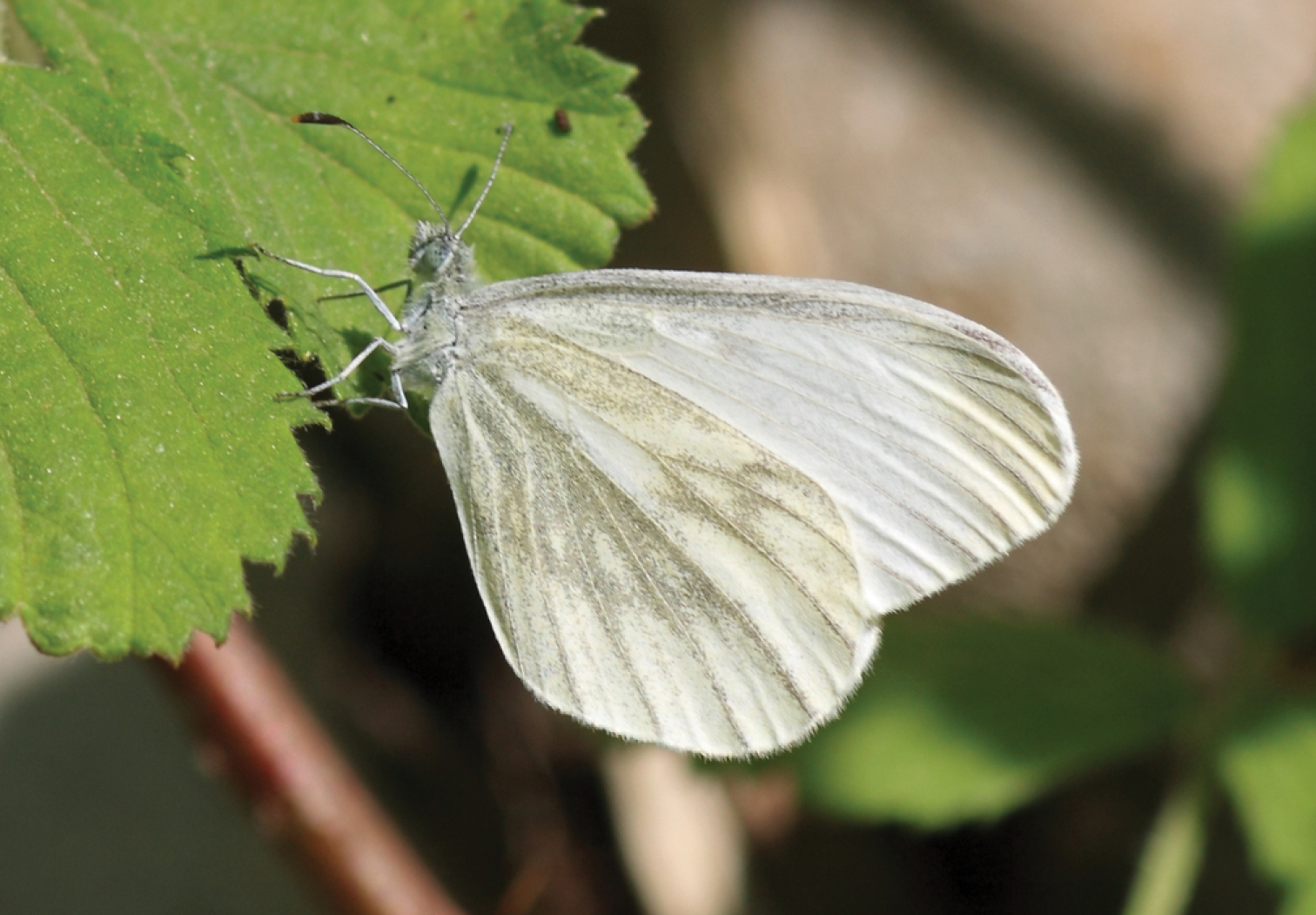

Scientific classification
- Kingdom: Animalia
- Phylum: Arthropoda
- Clade: Pancrustacea
- Class: Insecta
- Order: Lepidoptera
- Family: Pieridae
- Genus: Leptidea
- Species: L. morsei

Binomial name
- Leptidea morsei (Fenton, 1881)

Synonyms
- Leptosia morsei Fenton, 1881

= Leptidea morsei =

Fenton's wood white

Species of butterfly

Leptidea morsei (Fenton's wood white) is a butterfly of the family Pieridae. It is found from central Europe to Siberia, Ussuri, Korea, northern China and Japan.

The wingspan is 46–54 mm. The wing ground color is white. The forewings are falcate- elongated at the apex and with a concave outer margin. The male forewing has a dark spot at the apex. In spring-generation butterflies, the hindwing base color is grayish-ochre on the underside, while in summer-generation individuals, it is white..Adults are on wing from April to May and again from June to July in two generations per year.

The larvae feed on legumes, including Lathyrus niger, Lathyrus hallersteinii and Lathyrus vernus in Europe. Other recorded food plants include Vicia cracca, Vicia japonica and Vicia amoena. Hibernation takes place in the pupal stage.

== Subspecies ==
- Leptidea morsei morsei
- Leptidea morsei major Grund, 1905
- Leptidea morsei morseides Verity, 1911

== Taxonomy ==
Julius Rober in Seitz considered it to be "apparently an aberration of Leptidea amurensis in which the subapical spot of the forewing above is less developed.

== Gallery ==
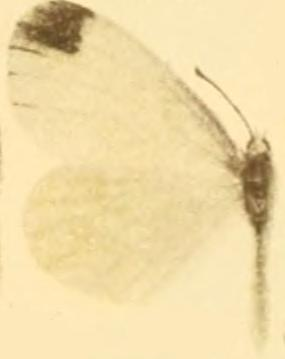
Leptidea morsei major

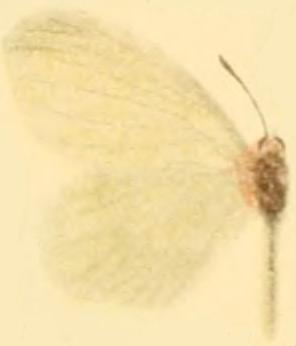
Leptidea morsei major female
