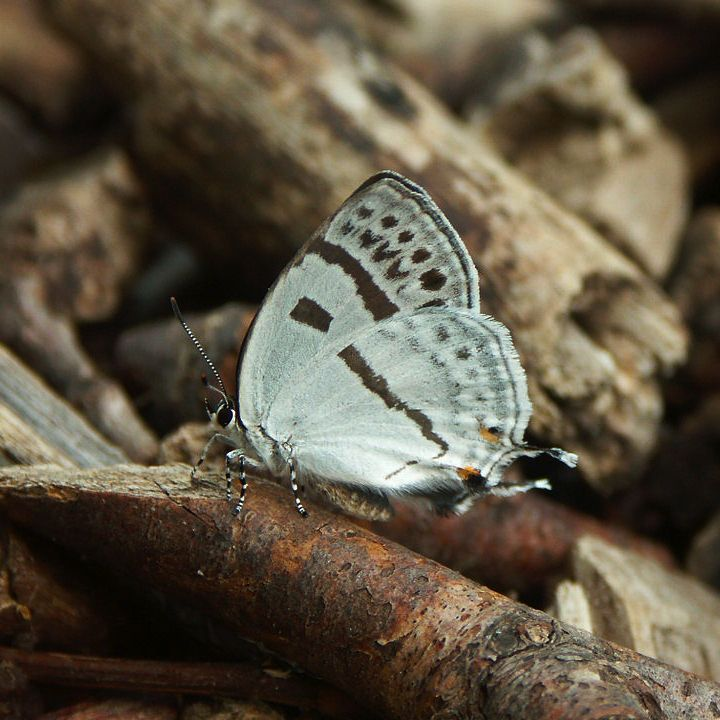

Scientific classification
- Kingdom: Animalia
- Phylum: Arthropoda
- Class: Insecta
- Order: Lepidoptera
- Family: Lycaenidae
- Genus: Antigius
- Species: A. attilia

Binomial name
- Antigius attilia (Bremer, 1861)

Synonyms
- Thecla attilia Bremer, 1861; Zephyrus neoattilia Sugitani, 1919; Zephyrus sayamaensis Watari, 1936; Zephyrus sagamiensis Kyuzaki, 1937; Antigius sagamii Wakabayashi, Tanaka & Sugai, 1958; Antigius sayamae Wakabayashi, Tanaka & Sugai, 1958; Antigius signatus Fujioka, 1971; Antigius paipan Fujioka, 1993; Antigius inverseneoattilia Fujioka, 1993; Antigius supermeoattilia Fujioka, 1993; Antigius michiyoae Morita, 2003

= Antigius attilia =

Species of butterfly

Antigius attilia is a butterfly of the family Lycaenidae. It is widespread from Japan, the Korean Peninsula, the Russian Far East throughout northern, central and western China to Taiwan.

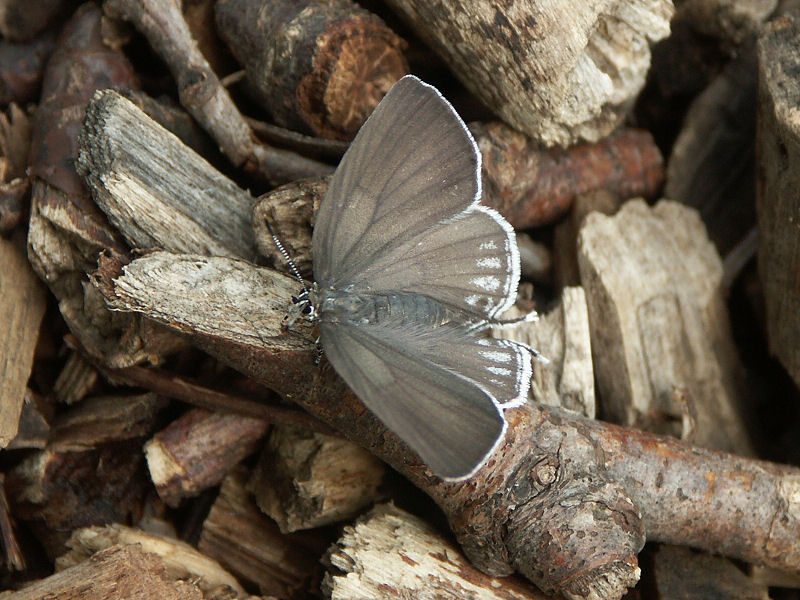

The wingspan is 14–16 millimetres (0.55–0.63 in).The upper side of the wings of both sexes is the same - black brown.The male is unicolorous. In the female the hind wings on the upper side with one or two chains of small, faintly visible whitish submarginal spots along the outer edge. The underside of the wings is greyish-white with black marginal spots and a brown transverse stripe. The spot at the apex of the central cell of the fore wing is rectangular in shape, with distinct edges. At the posterior corner of the hindwing there are two pairs of small orange-black spots. The tail on the hind wings is thin, black, 3–4 mm long

The larvae feed on Quercus serrata, Quercus acutissima, Quercus variabilis, Quercus mongolica, Quercus dentate and Quercus aliena. Subspecies yamanakashoji has been recorded on Quercus acutissima.

== Subspecies ==
- Antigius attilia atilla
- Antigius attilia tropicanus (Myanmar)
- Antigius attilia yamanakashoji (Japan)
- Antigius attilia obsoletus (Taiwan)
