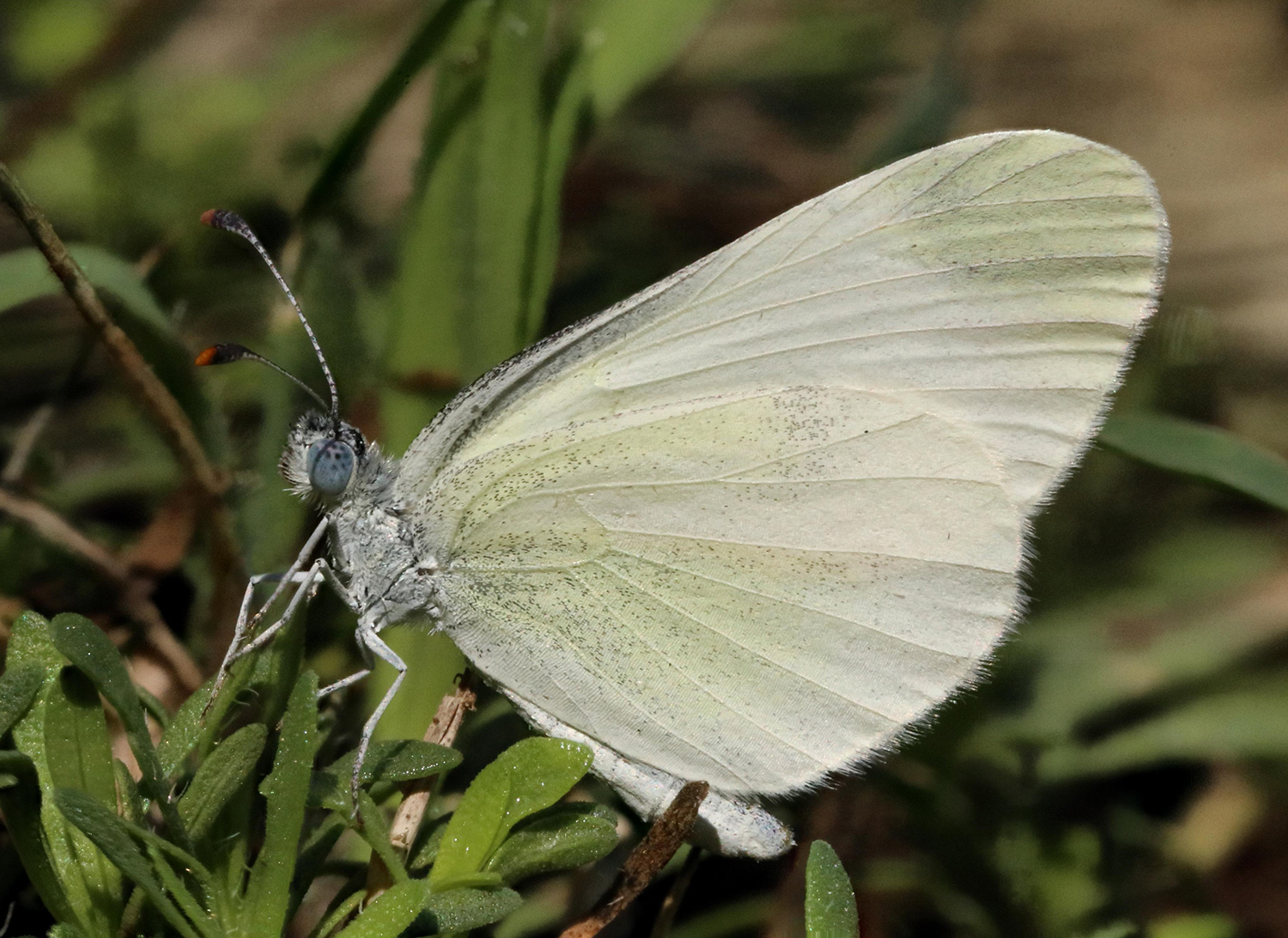

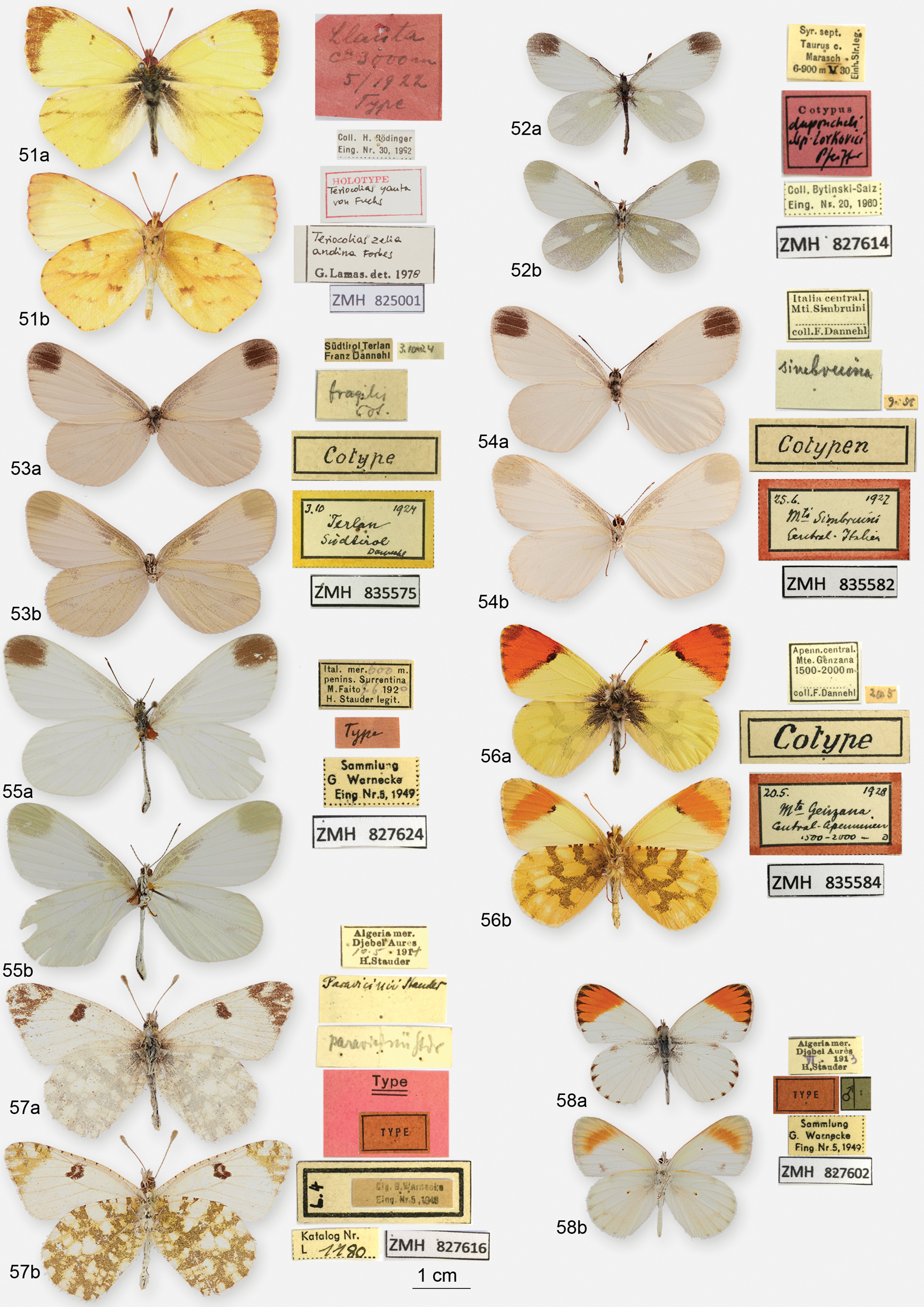

Scientific classification
- Kingdom: Animalia
- Phylum: Arthropoda
- Class: Insecta
- Order: Lepidoptera
- Family: Pieridae
- Genus: Leptidea
- Species: L. duponcheli

Binomial name
- Leptidea duponcheli (Staudinger, 1871)

= Leptidea duponcheli =

Species of butterfly

Leptidea duponcheli, the Eastern wood white, is a butterfly found in the Palearctic (South Europe, Asia Minor, Balkans, Iran) that belongs to the whites family.

== Subspecies ==
- Leptidea duponcheli duponcheli
- Leptidea duponcheli lorkovici (Pfeiffer, 1932) turkisch Nordsyrien
- Leptidea duponcheli maiae Alberti, 1969 Armenia, Greater Caucasus.
- Leptidea duponcheli vartiani Gross & Ebert, 1975. Iran

== Description from Seitz ==
L. duponcheli Stgr. (27 g), from South France, the eastern districts of South Europe, Asia Minor, Armenia, and Persia, differs from sinapis in the marking of the underside, as shown in the figure. — In the summer-form aestiva Stgr. (27 g) the upperside is feebly, the underside more strongly yellow, the latter being without markings.

== Biology ==
The larva feeds on Onobrychis, Leguminosae.
