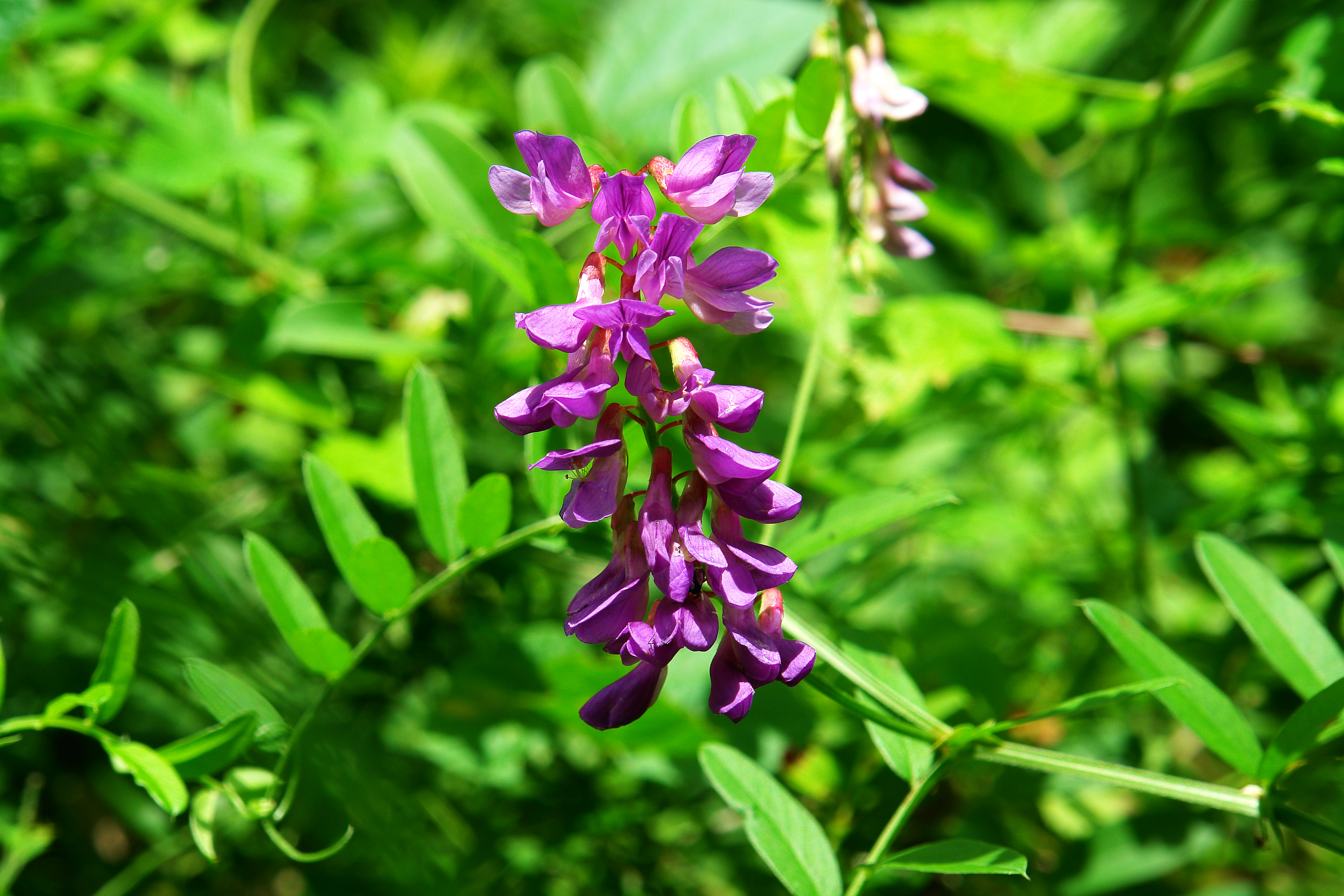

Scientific classification
- Kingdom: Plantae
- Clade: Tracheophytes
- Clade: Angiosperms
- Clade: Eudicots
- Clade: Rosids
- Order: Fabales
- Family: Fabaceae
- Subfamily: Faboideae
- Genus: Vicia
- Species: V. amoena

Binomial name
- Vicia amoena Fisch.

= Vicia amoena =

Species of plant

Vicia amoena, the lovely vetch, is a plant species in the genus Vicia.

== Description ==
This plant is a herbaceous perennial climbing plant growing 50 - 100 cm tall. It has multiple branches per stem and is a scrambler. this species has heavily clustered purple vetch flowers.

== Habitat ==
This species's habitat is thickets and meadows, as well as grasslands, hills, slopes and occasionally forests.

== Range ==
This species's range is

E. Asia - northern China, Japan, Korea, Mongolia and Russia.

== Edibility ==
This species's leaves are eaten in Korea and sold in food markets.
