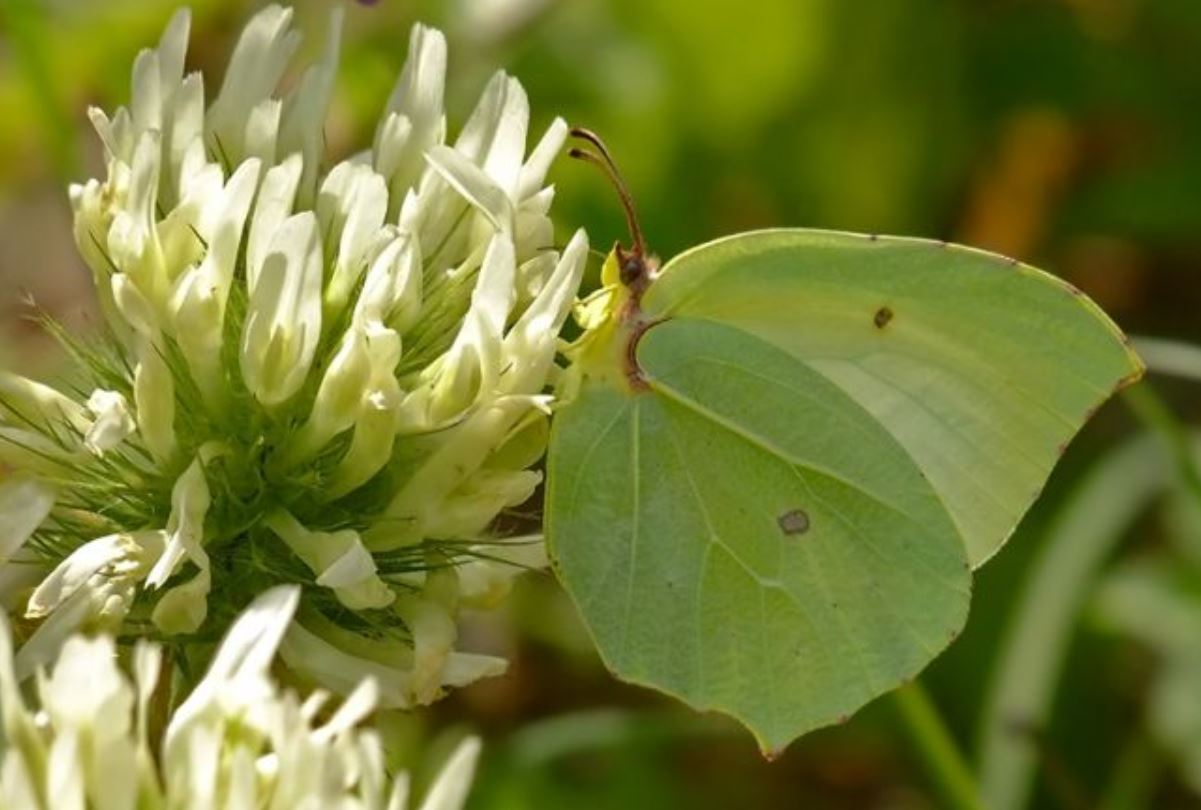
- Gonepteryx farinosa Turkey

Scientific classification
- Kingdom: Animalia
- Phylum: Arthropoda
- Class: Insecta
- Order: Lepidoptera
- Family: Pieridae
- Genus: Gonepteryx
- Species: G. farinosa

Binomial name
- Gonepteryx farinosa (Zeller, 1847)

= Gonepteryx farinosa =

Species of butterfly

Gonepteryx farinosa , the Powdered Brimstone, is a butterfly found in the Palearctic that belongs to the whites family.

== Subspecies ==
- G. f. farinosa Southeast, Asia Minor, Syria, Iran, Transcaucasia, Pamirs-Alai, Himalaya
- G. f. turcirana de Freina, 1983 Caucasus Minor, Armenian Highland
- G. f. meridioirana de Freina, 1983 Kopet-Dagh
- G. f. chitralensis Moore, 1906 Ghissar, Alai, Darvaz, West Pamirs

== Description from Seitz ==
Gonepteryx farinosa from West Asia (the occurrence in North Africa is very doubtful), is conspicuously larger than specimens of G. rhamni from Central Europe or even South France; the scaling of the male is thick, chalky, being lighter above and below on the distal portion of the wings, the whole hindwing, moreover, being somewhat lighter in tint than the forewing; the yellow central spots are more indistinct, being often absent from the forewing, especially in females; the latter still paler than G. rhamni females. The specific distinctness of G. farinosa has often been doubted, as G. farinosa occurs together with G. rhamni and G. cleopatra (for instance in southern Asia Minor).

== Biology ==
The larva feeds on Rhamnus, Ziziphus, Paliurus
