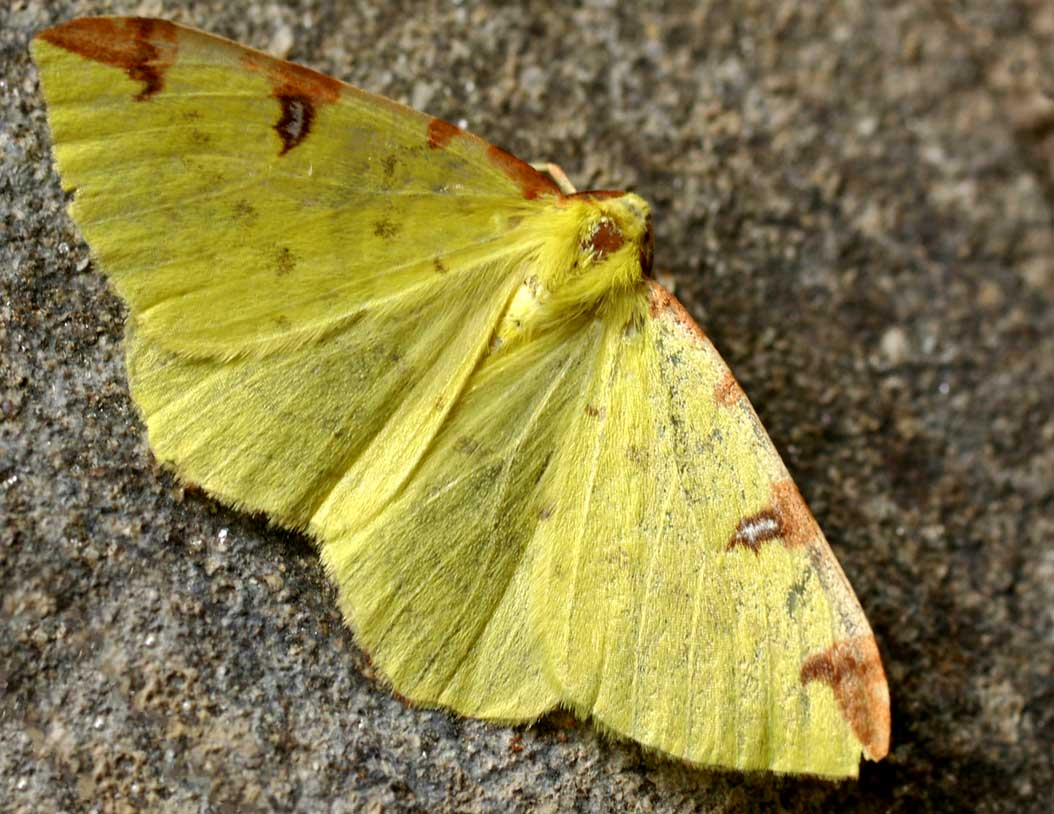

Scientific classification
- Kingdom: Animalia
- Phylum: Arthropoda
- Clade: Pancrustacea
- Class: Insecta
- Order: Lepidoptera
- Family: Geometridae
- Genus: Opisthograptis
- Species: O. luteolata

Binomial name
- Opisthograptis luteolata (Linnaeus, 1758)

Synonyms
- Ptheir rare; Rumia provincialis Oberthür, 1919

= Brimstone moth =

Species of moth

The brimstone moth (Opisthograptis luteolata) is a moth of the family Geometridae. The species was first described by Carl Linnaeus in his 1758 10th edition of Systema Naturae. It should not be confused with the brimstone butterfly Gonepteryx rhamni.

== Description and life cycle ==
This species is unmistakable within its range, with bright yellow wings marked with small brown patches along the costa of the forewing and a small brown-edged white stigma, also on the forewing. The wingspan is 33–46 mm. "0. luteolata L. The only European species. The name-typical form has on the forewing red-brown costal markings at the base, at the discal mark and triangularly at the apex; faint, irregularly grey antemedian and postmedian lines, interrupted at the veins. Hindwing with dark discal dot and faint grey postmedian line. — aestiva Vorh. & Müll.-Rutz is a smaller, more deeply coloured summer brood form. It seems to be the principal or only form in Tunis. — ab. flavissima Krulik. is almost entirely yellow, only with slight remnants of the costal markings. — ab. albescens Ckll. has the ground colour pure white instead of yellow. Very pale yellow examples have been separated as intermedia Harrison. — ab. niko Chr. is according to. Staudinger an extraordinary aberration with both wings broadly fuscous margined and the basal part of the forewing brownish. Perhaps accidental, as the yellow of this species is highly susceptible to various kinds of chemical action.- provincialis Ob. is a pale, weakly marked form from Provence. — emaculata Graes. lacks the apical patch of the forewing. Prevalent in Central Asia, accidental elsewhere. — mimulina Btlr. has the cell-mark large, the lines strong, the 2 principal lines of the forewing ending in conspicuous red-brown spots on the hindmargin. N. India: Dharmsala etc."

The moth sometimes flies during the day but mainly at night, and is attracted to light.

The larva is brown or green with a "horn" on its back and feeds on a variety of trees and shrubs. Caterpillar food plants include Prunus spinosa, Crataegus monogyna, and Sorbus aucuparia.

The adult flies from April to October. In temperature climates the moth usually has three overlapping generations, in cooler climates just one, per year.

== Distribution ==
The brimstone is found throughout the Palearctic region and Western Asia.

== Early research ==
The English zoologist Edward Bagnall Poulton, author of The Colours of Animals (1890) described countershading in insects including the caterpillar larvae of the brimstone moth. The American artist Abbott Handerson Thayer, generally considered the originator of the theory of countershading, credited Poulton with its partial discovery.

== Gallery ==
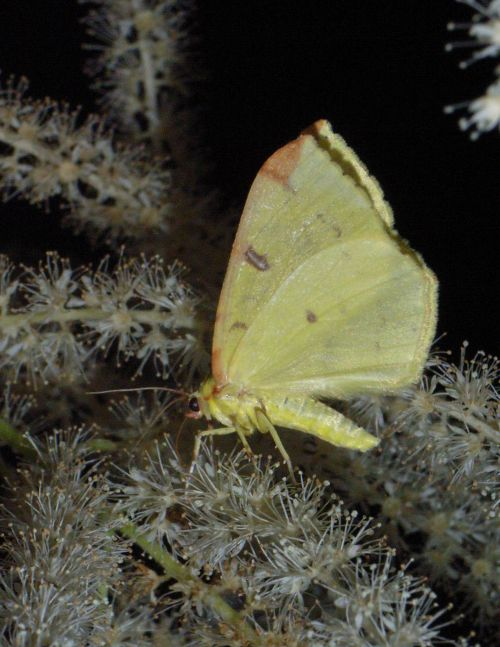
Underside

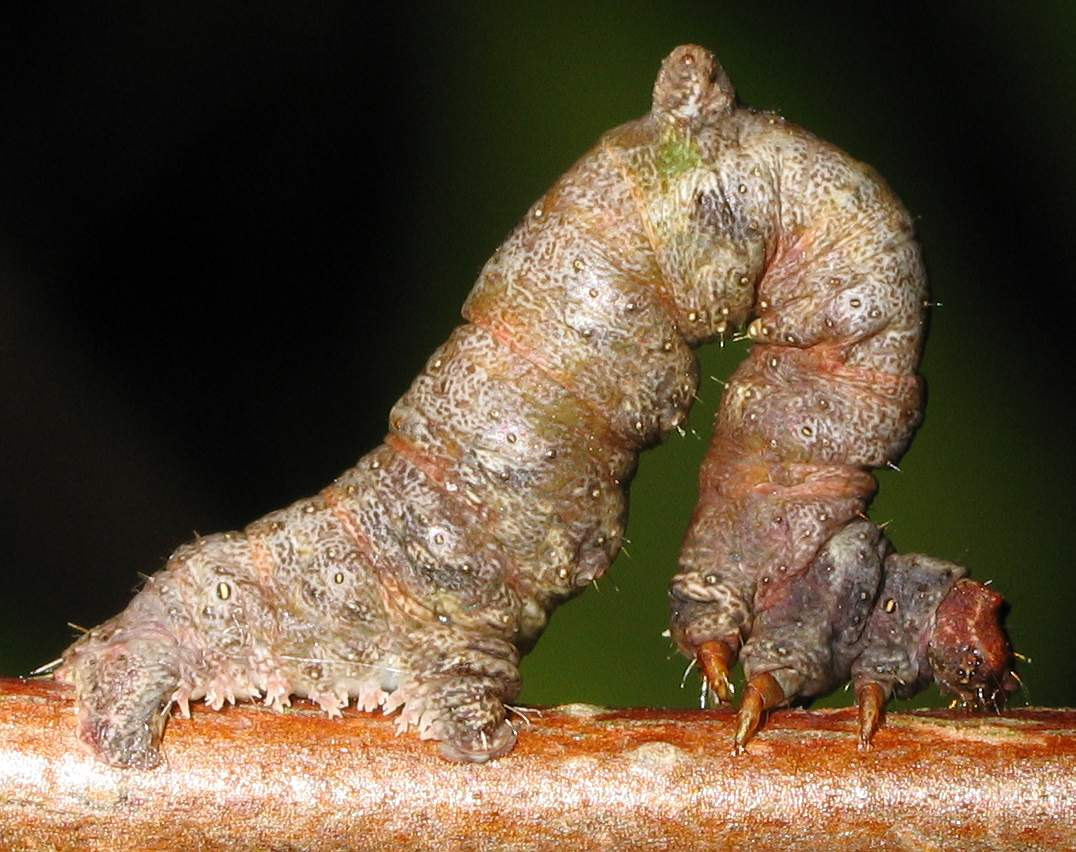
Caterpillar

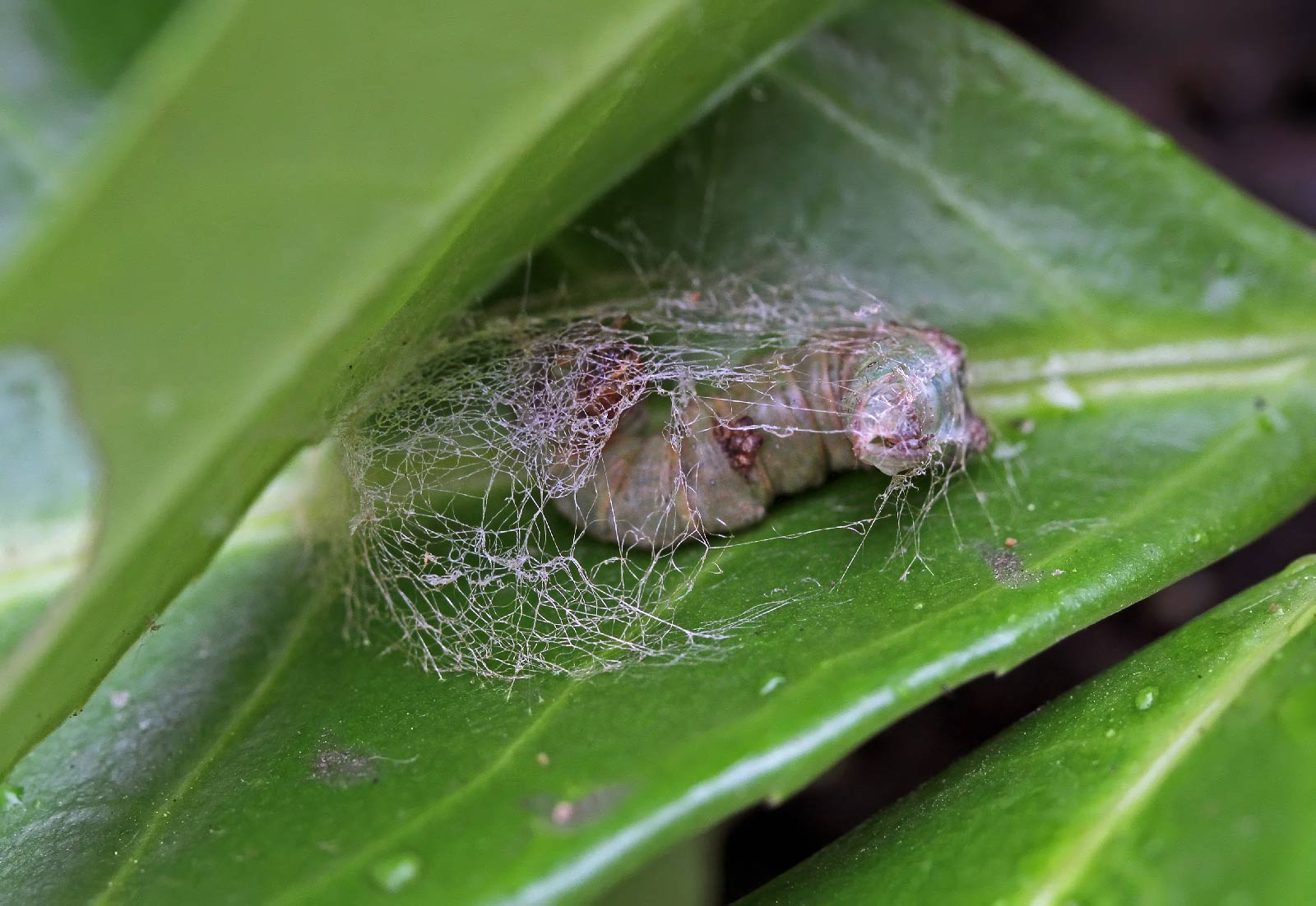
Pupating

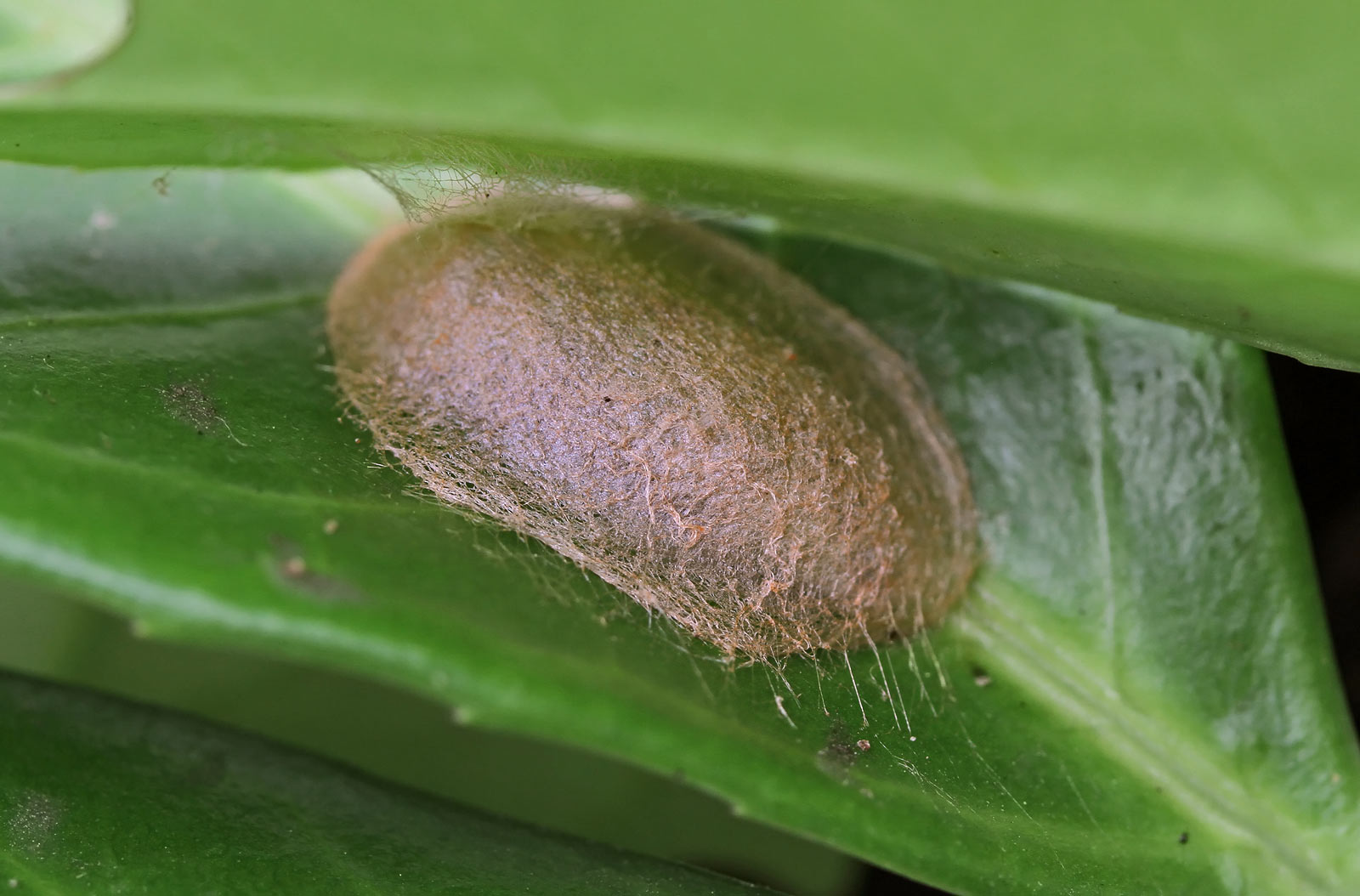
Cocoon

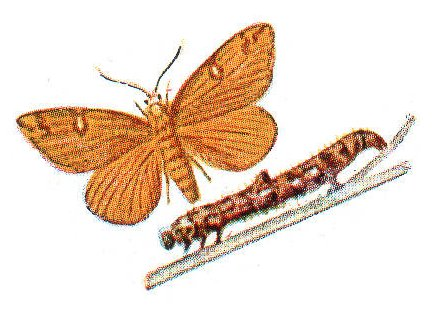
Illustration from the Meyers Blitz-Lexikon, 1932

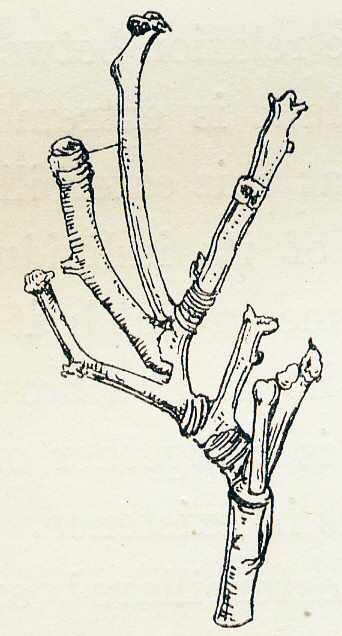
Figure of larva as twig mimic

== Bibliography ==
- Chinery, Michael Collins Guide to the Insects of Britain and Western Europe 1986 (Reprinted 1991)
- Skinner, Bernard Colour Identification Guide to Moths of the British Isles 1984
