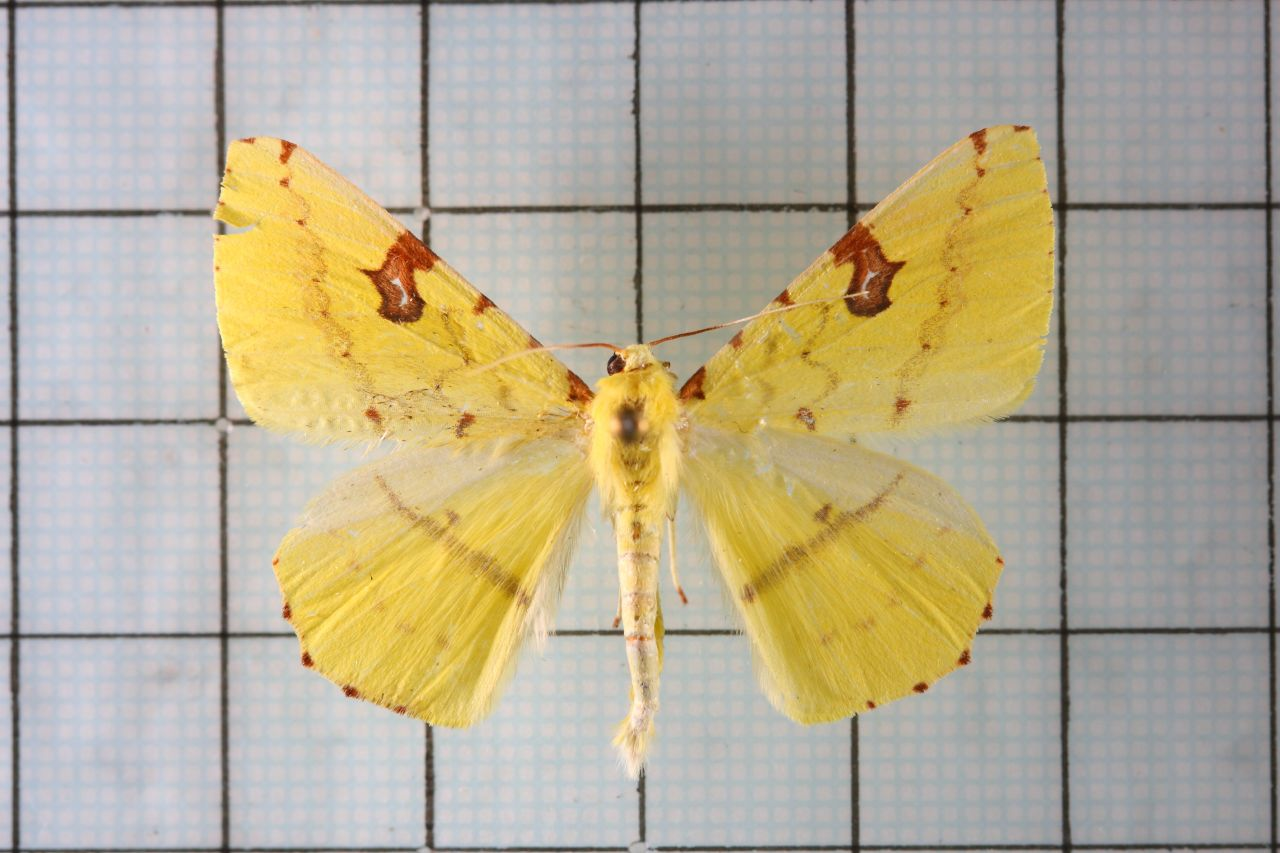

Scientific classification
- Domain: Eukaryota
- Kingdom: Animalia
- Phylum: Arthropoda
- Class: Insecta
- Order: Lepidoptera
- Family: Geometridae
- Genus: Opisthograptis
- Species: O. moelleri

Binomial name
- Opisthograptis moelleri Warren, 1893

= Opisthograptis moelleri =

Species of moth

Opisthograptis moelleri is a moth of the family Geometridae. It is found in northeast Asia.

The wingspan is 45–55 mm.
