= Gonepteryx maderensis =

Madeira brimstone

Conservation status
- Endangered (IUCN 3.1)

Scientific classification
- Kingdom: Animalia
- Phylum: Arthropoda
- Clade: Pancrustacea
- Class: Insecta
- Order: Lepidoptera
- Family: Pieridae
- Genus: Gonepteryx
- Species: G. maderensis

Binomial name
- Gonepteryx maderensis Felder, 1862

Species of butterfly

Gonepteryx maderensis, the Madeira brimstone, is a species of butterfly in the family Pieridae. It is endemic to Madeira. Its natural habitat is temperate forests. It is threatened by habitat loss.
