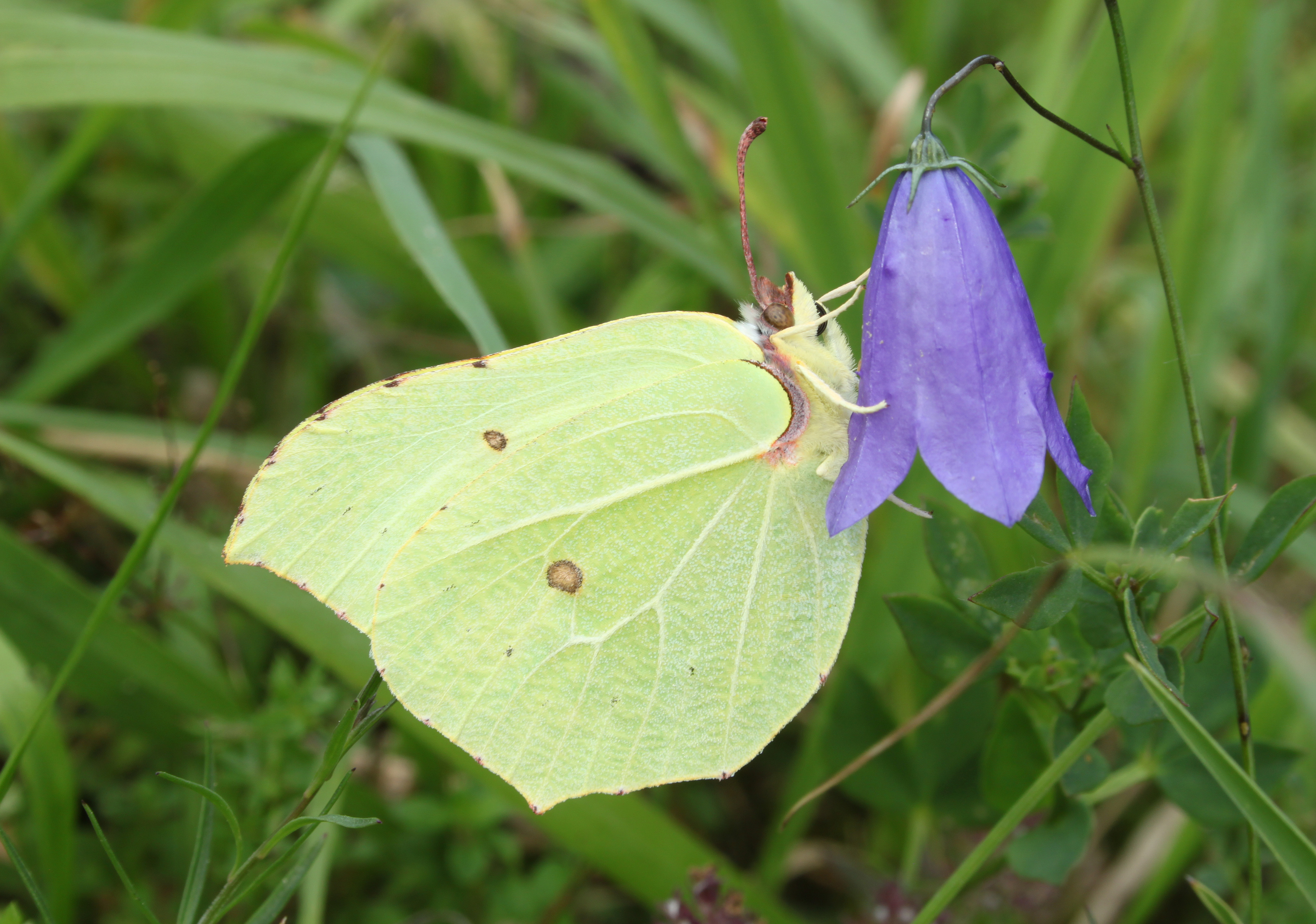
- Gonepteryx rhamni

Scientific classification
- Kingdom: Animalia
- Phylum: Arthropoda
- Clade: Pancrustacea
- Class: Insecta
- Order: Lepidoptera
- Family: Pieridae
- Tribe: Goniopterygini
- Genus: Gonepteryx; Leach, 1819

Species
- 15, see text

Synonyms
- Gonoptera Billberg, 1820; Rhodocera Boisduval & Leconte, [1830]; Goniapteryx Westwood, 1840 (preocc. Goniapteryx Perty, 1833); Goniopteryx Wallengren, 1853; Goniopteryx Burmeister, 1878; Gonopteryx Schatz, [1886]

= Gonepteryx =

Butterfly genus in family Pieridae

Gonepteryx is a genus of butterflies in the family Pieridae; there are about 15 species of Gonepteryx. They live in Europe, Asia, and Northern Africa. They are commonly known as brimstones for the bright yellow colour of the wings of most species. These share the same name as the much larger tropical genus Anteos. These inhabit much of central and South America and also North America. This species are known for being the kings of butterfly longevity. 10–13 months is the lifespan for many temperate species. Anteos, however, is much shorter lived. The adults will often mimic ivy leaves at rest. Male brimstone butterflies can withstand cooler temperatures and are able to fly after just 4 months in hibernation. Female brimstone butterflies need warmer climates to survive, and therefore are in hibernation longer. The male butterflies have a longer life span as they are more resilient to a wider range of temperatures, unlike the female.

== Species ==
It contains the following species:

- Gonepteryx acuminata (C. & R. Felder, 1862)
- Gonepteryx aspasia (Ménétriès, 1859)
- Gonepteryx amintha (Blanchard, 1871)
- Gonepteryx burmensis (Tytler 1926)
- Gonepteryx chitralensis (Moore, 1905)
- Gonepteryx cleobule (Hübner, 1824) – Canary brimstone
- Gonepteryx cleopatra (Linnaeus, 1767) – Cleopatra
- Gonepteryx eversi (Rehnelt, 1974
- Gonepteryx farinosa (Zeller, 1847) – powdered brimstone
- Gonepteryx maderensis (Felder, 1862) – Madeira brimstone
- Gonepteryx mahaguru (Gistel, 1857) – lesser brimstone
- Gonepteryx maxima (Butler, 1885)
- Gonepteryx nepalensis (Doubleday, 1847)
- Gonepteryx palmae (Stamm 1963) – La Palma brimstone
- Gonepteryx rhamni (Linnaeus, 1758) – common brimstone
- Gonepteryx taiwana (Paravicini 1913)
