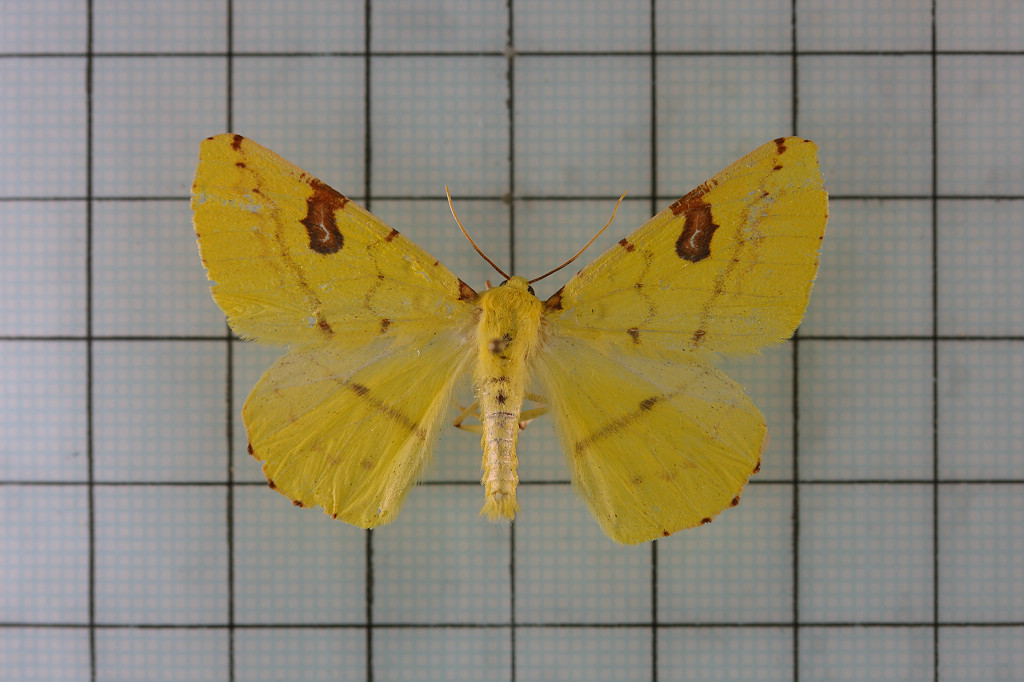

Scientific classification
- Kingdom: Animalia
- Phylum: Arthropoda
- Clade: Pancrustacea
- Class: Insecta
- Order: Lepidoptera
- Family: Geometridae
- Genus: Opisthograptis
- Species: O. punctilineata

Binomial name
- Opisthograptis punctilineata Wileman, 1910

= Opisthograptis punctilineata =

Species of moth

Opisthograptis punctilineata is a moth of the family Geometridae first described by Alfred Ernest Wileman in 1910. It is found in Taiwan.

The wingspan is 40–50 mm.
