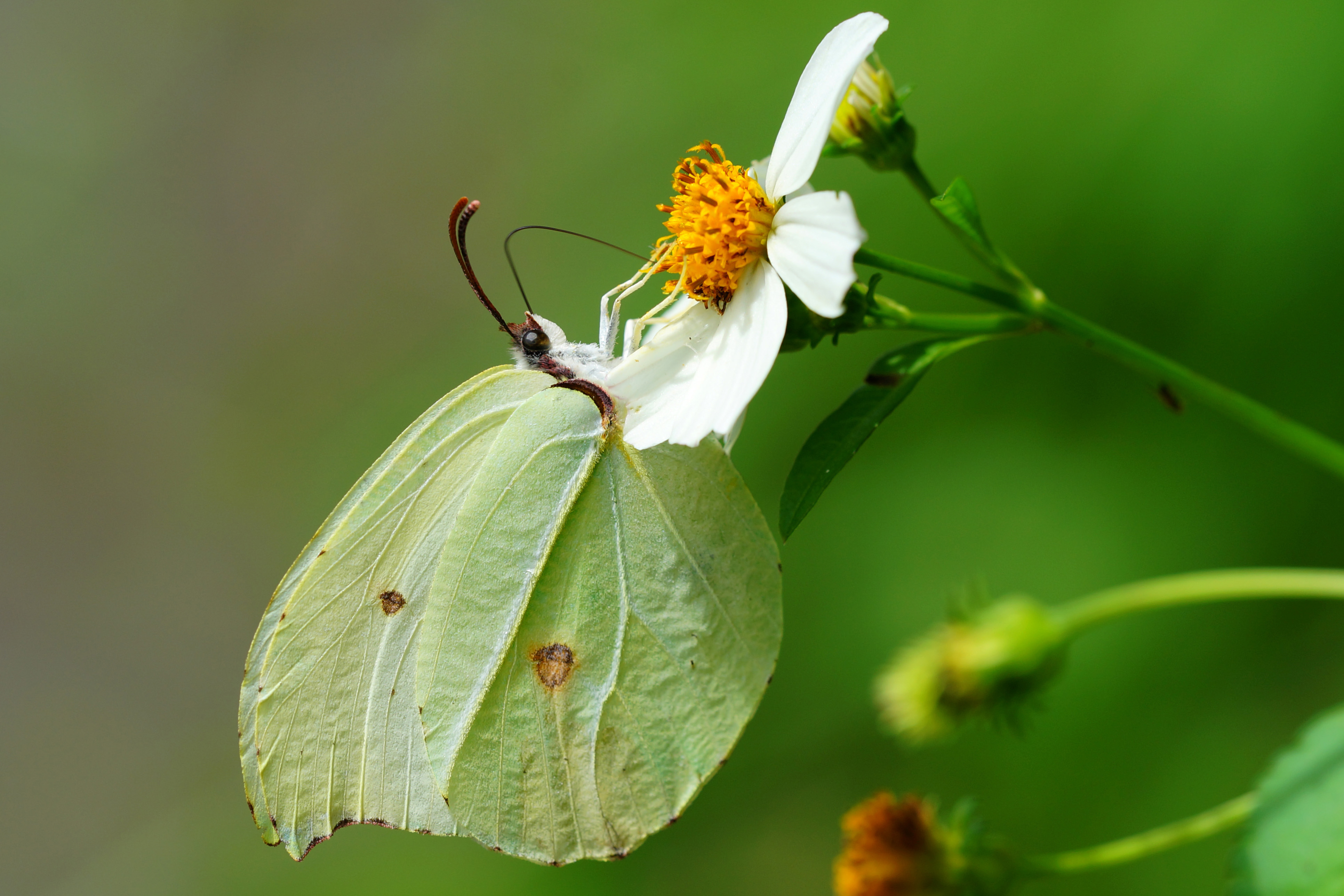

Scientific classification
- Kingdom: Animalia
- Phylum: Arthropoda
- Class: Insecta
- Order: Lepidoptera
- Family: Pieridae
- Genus: Gonepteryx
- Species: G. amintha

Binomial name
- Gonepteryx amintha (Blanchard, 1871)

Synonyms
- Rhodocera amintha Blanchard, 1871; Rhodocera formosana Fruhstorfer, 1908

= Gonepteryx amintha =

Species of butterfly

Gonepteryx amintha is a butterfly of the family Pieridae. It is found in the East Palearctic.

== Subspecies ==
- G. a. amintha
- G. a. formosana (Fruhstorfer, 1908) (Taiwan)
- G. a. limonia Mell, 1943 (South Ussuri, Yunnan)
- G. a. meiyuanus Murayama & Shimonoya, 1963 (Taiwan)
- G. a. murayamae Nekrutenko, 1973 (Yunnan, Sichuan)
- G. a. thibetana Nekrutenko, 1968 (south-eastern Tibet)
