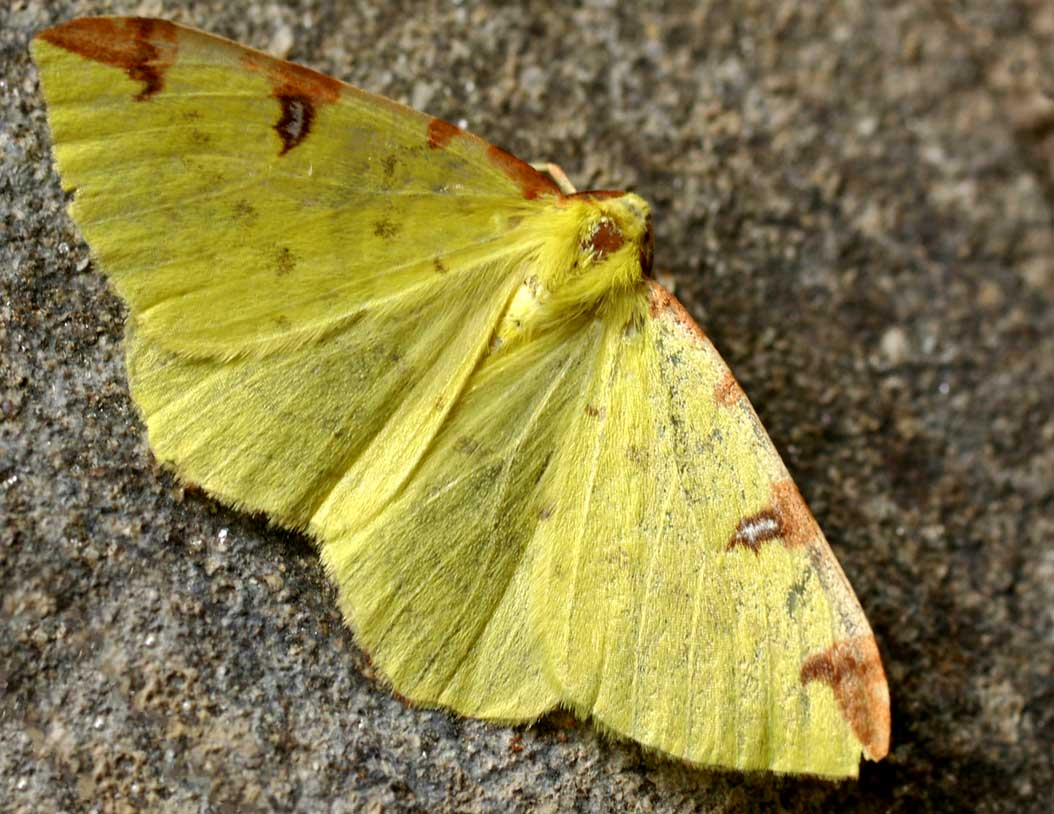

Scientific classification
- Domain: Eukaryota
- Kingdom: Animalia
- Phylum: Arthropoda
- Class: Insecta
- Order: Lepidoptera
- Family: Geometridae
- Tribe: Ourapterygini
- Genus: Opisthograptis; Hübner, 1823

Synonyms
- Rumia Duponchel, 1829

= Opisthograptis =

Genus of moths

Opisthograptis is a genus of moths in the family Geometridae erected by Jacob Hübner in 1823.

== Species ==
- Opisthograptis inornataria (Leech, 1897)
- Opisthograptis irrorata (Hampson, 1895)
- Opisthograptis luteolata (Linnaeus, 1758)
- Opisthograptis moelleri Warren, 1893
- Opisthograptis punctilineata Wileman, 1910
- Opisthograptis rumiformis (Hampson, 1902)
- Opisthograptis sulphurea (Butler, 1880)
- Opisthograptis swanni Prout, 1923
- Opisthograptis tridentifera (Moore, 1888)
- Opisthograptis trimacularia (Leech, 1897)
- Opisthograptis tsekuna Wehrli, 1940
