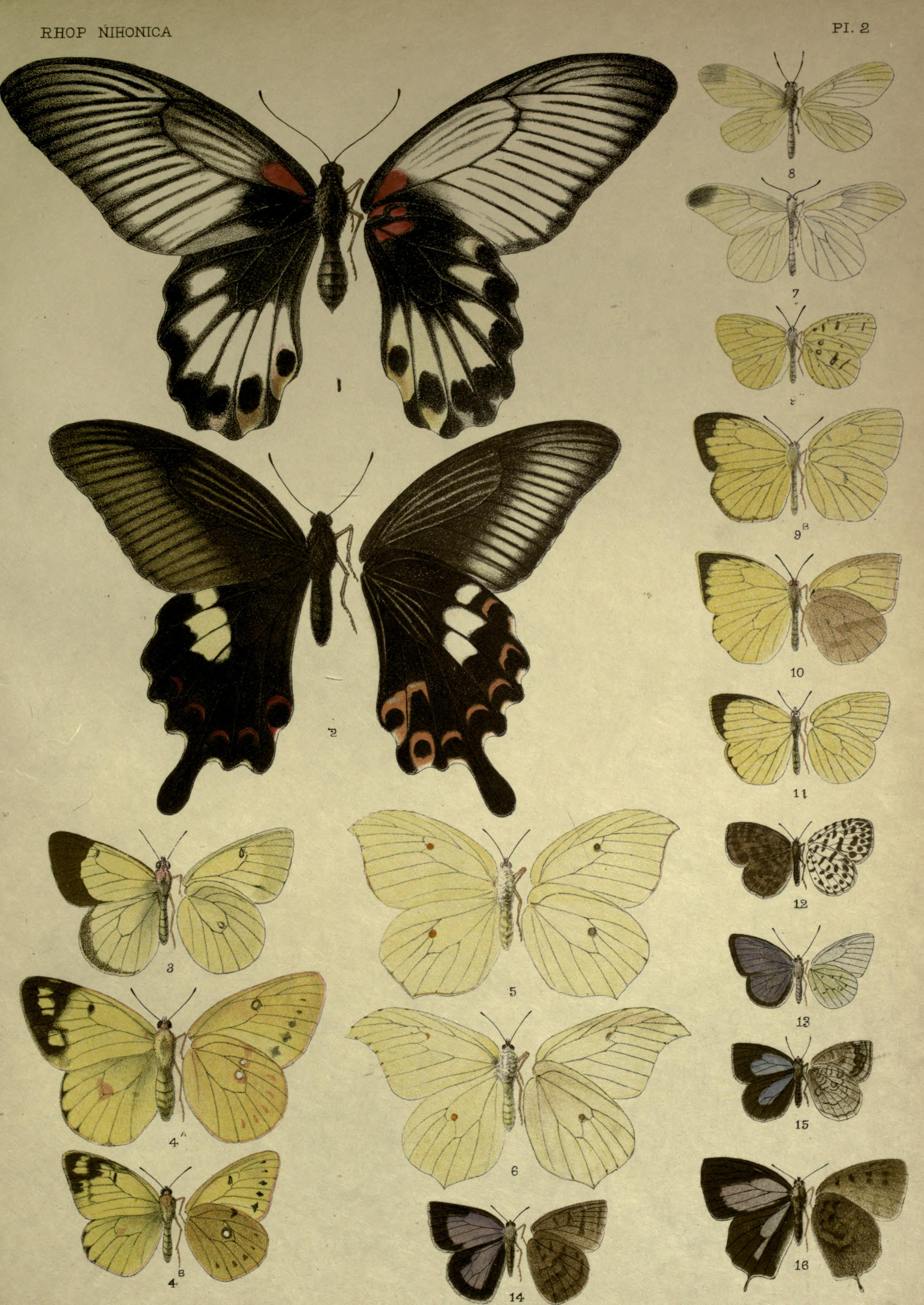
- Gonepteryx maxima in Rhopalocera nihonica

Scientific classification
- Kingdom: Animalia
- Phylum: Arthropoda
- Clade: Pancrustacea
- Class: Insecta
- Order: Lepidoptera
- Family: Pieridae
- Genus: Gonepteryx
- Species: G. maxima

Binomial name
- Gonepteryx maxima Butler, 1885

= Gonepteryx maxima =

Species of butterfly

Gonepteryx maxima is a butterfly of the family Pieridae. It was described by Arthur Gardiner Butler in 1885. It is found from north-eastern China to Korea, Japan, the Russian Far East (Amur, Ussuri) and Japan. The habitat consists of steppe and forest-steppe areas.

Adults are on wing from the end of July to September. Adults overwinter and fly again from May to June.

The larvae feed on Rhamnus ussuriensis.

== Subspecies ==
- Gonepteryx maxima maxima
- Gonepteryx maxima amurensis Graeser, 1888 (Amur, Ussuri)
