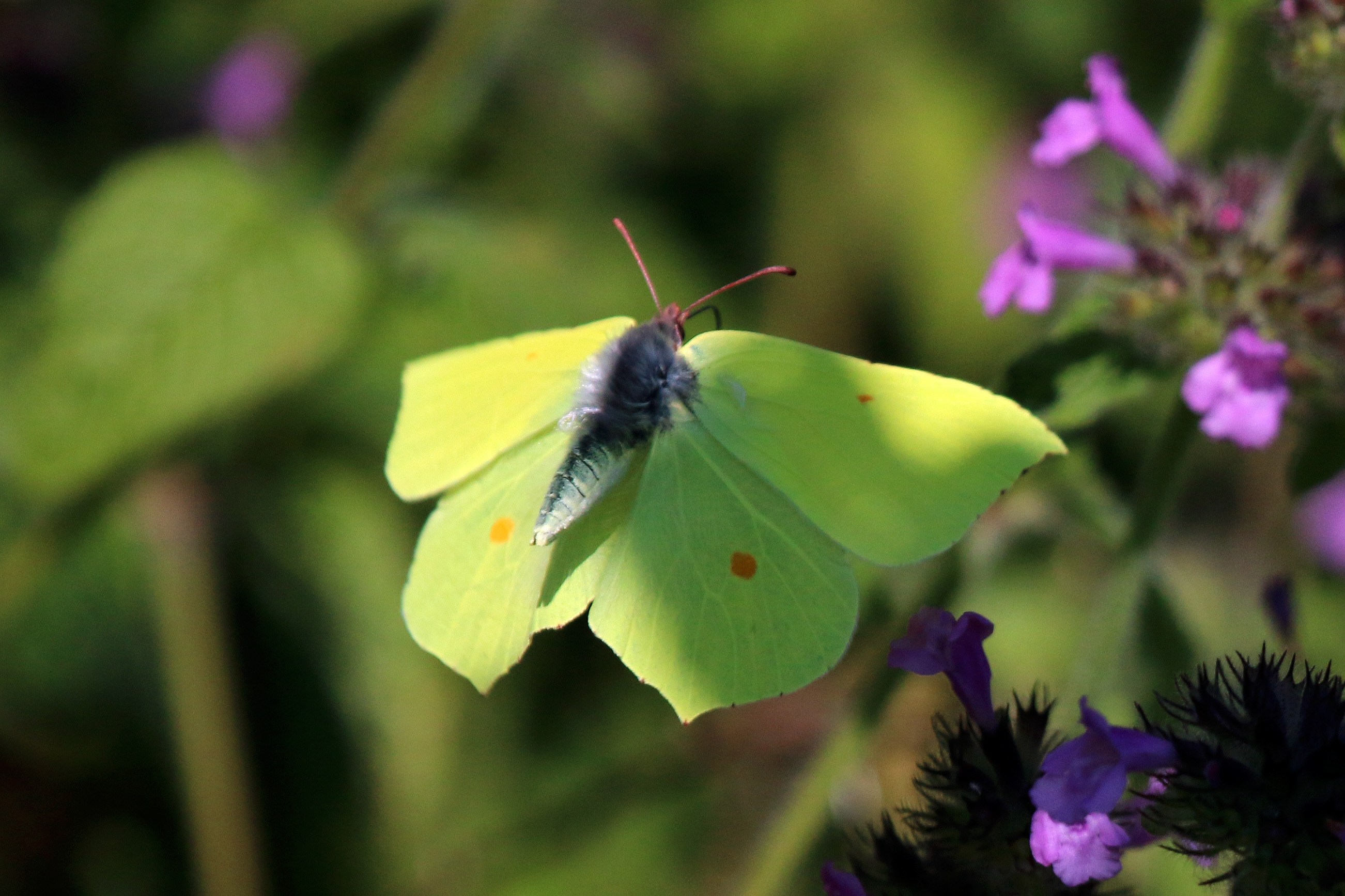
- Male in flight, Dry Sandford Pit, Oxfordshire
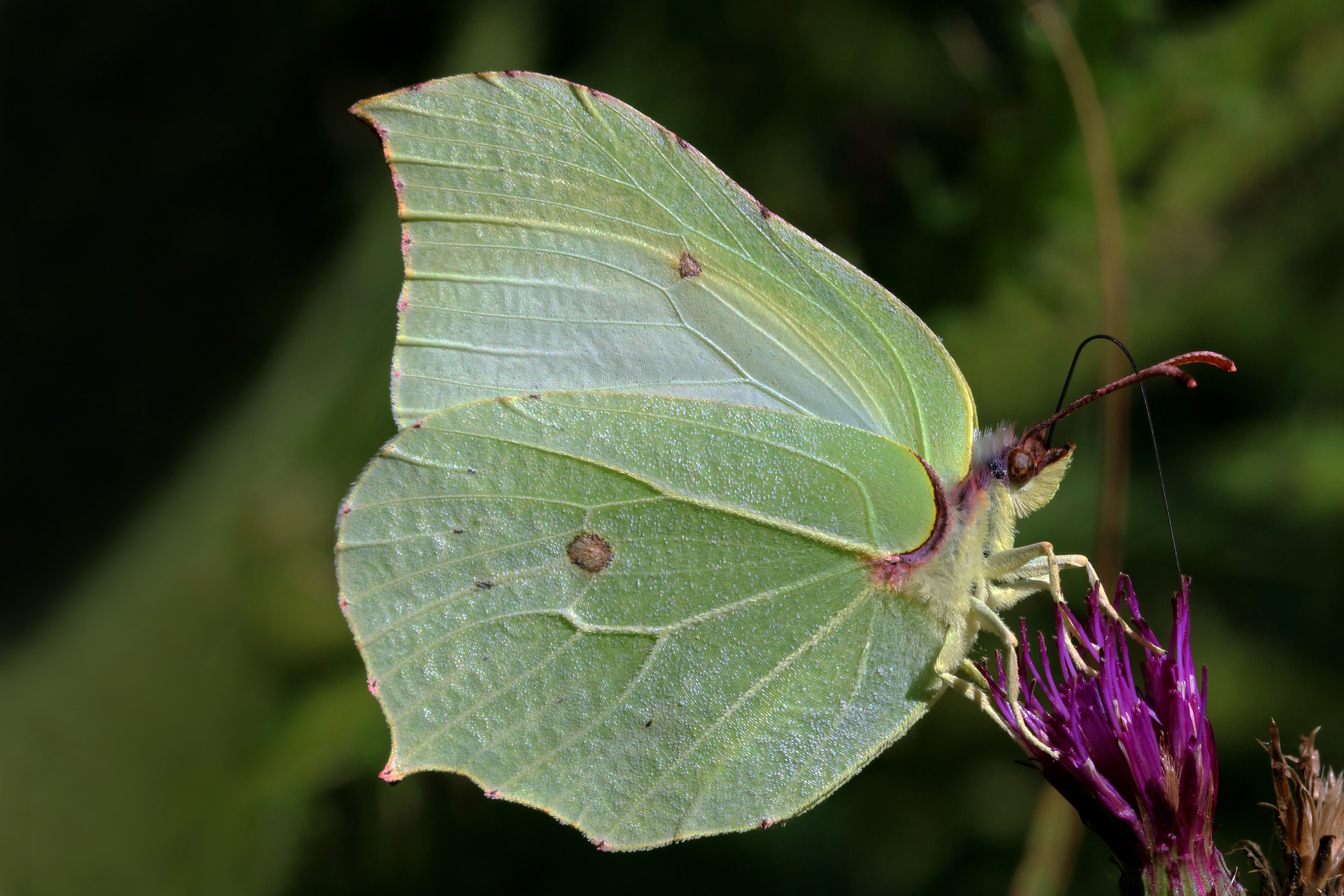
- Female at Parsonage Moor, Oxfordshire

Conservation status
- Least Concern (IUCN 3.1)

Scientific classification
- Kingdom: Animalia
- Phylum: Arthropoda
- Clade: Pancrustacea
- Class: Insecta
- Order: Lepidoptera
- Family: Pieridae
- Genus: Gonepteryx
- Species: G. rhamni

Binomial name
- Gonepteryx rhamni (Linnaeus, 1758)

Subspecies
- G. r. gravesi; G. r. kurdistana; G. r. meridionalis; G. r. miljanowskii; G. r. rhamni; G. r. tianshanica; G. r. transiens

Synonyms
- Papilio rhamni Linnaeus, 1758

= Gonepteryx rhamni =

Common brimstone

Species of butterfly

Gonepteryx rhamni, commonly named the Common Brimstone, is a butterfly of the family Pieridae. It lives throughout the Palearctic zone and is commonly found across Europe, Asia, and North Africa. Across much of its range, it is the only species of its genus, and is therefore simply known locally as the Brimstone. Its wing span size is 60–74 mm (2.4–2.9 in). It should not be confused with the Brimstone moth Opisthograptis luteolata.

The brimstone relies on two species of buckthorn plants as host plants for its larvae; this influences its geographic range and distribution, as these plants are commonly found in wetlands. The adult brimstone travels to woodland areas to spend seven months overwintering. In spring when their host plants have developed, they return to the wetlands to breed and lay eggs. Both the larval and adult forms of the common brimstone have protective coloration and behaviour that decreases their chances of being recognised and subsequently preyed upon.

The adult common brimstone has sexual dimorphism in its wing coloration: males have yellow wings and iridescence while females have greenish-white wings and are not iridescent. This iridescence is affected by environmental factors.

The name "butterfly" is believed to have originated from this species, which was called the "butter-coloured fly" by early British naturalists.

== Taxonomy ==
It was first described and published in Linnaeus's book, the 10th edition of Systema Naturae in 1758.

Brimstone is an old name for sulphur, the colour which matches the colour of the male's wings.

== Distribution and habitat ==
The Common Brimstone can be commonly found throughout the Palearctic. Individuals have been seen from western Europe to east Asia. The high mobility of this butterfly allows it to search widely for new host plant locations and expand its range. While the geographic distribution of the adult is larger than that of its host plant, its range is nevertheless limited by the presence of host plants due to the needs of its larval stage.

The Common Brimstone uses various environments for different stages of its life cycle. The butterfly inhabits wetlands during mating and breeding season, as they provide ideal areas for oviposition due to an abundance of host plants like the alder buckthorn. The Common Brimstone prefers laying eggs on younger host plants with late bud-bursts that are isolated from other plants in the area and exposed to both open space and sun. During the winter, adult brimstones travel to woodlands to hibernate, as they provide ideal overwintering sites with shelters such as evergreen foliage and holly. The Common Brimstone has an appearance that is highly similar to the leaves of these plants, so during hibernation it can remain hidden. In other seasons, habitat selection is also affected by the abundance of nectar as a food source for adult brimstones.

== Food resources ==
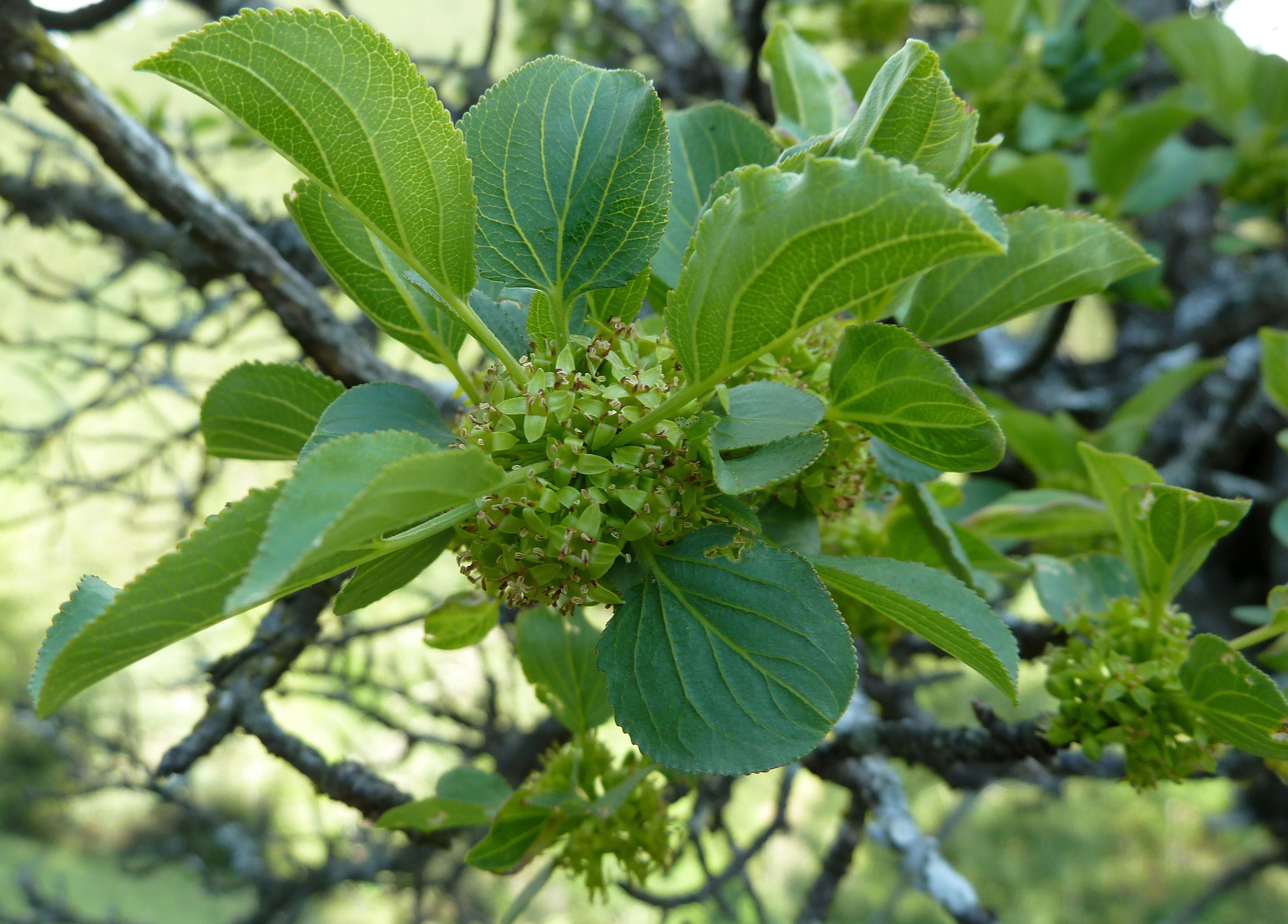
The common buckthorn, one of the larval host plants.

=== Caterpillar ===
Larval brimstones appear to feed on only two plant sources: the Alder Buckthorn (Frangula alnus) and the Common Buckthorn (Rhamnus cathartica). This influences the distribution of the adult brimstone, as the presence of these two buckthorn species is necessary for the survival of their offspring.

=== Adult ===
Unlike their larval forms, which are specialised for particular host plants, adult brimstones are not specialised nectar feeders. The common brimstone heavily feeds on the nectar of several flowering species including knapweed (Centaurea jacea) and scabious (Knautia arvensis and Succisa pratensis). However, brimstones have also been observed feeding on the nectar of coltsfoot (Tussilago farfara) in April and May and have been recorded gathering nectar from many other species of flowers. Adult food plant availability is another factor that is important for habitat selection.

== Parental care ==
=== Oviposition ===
The Common Brimstone is univoltine, meaning that it lays one generation of eggs each year. There are several ideal characteristics of the particular host plants chosen for oviposition. Adult brimstones lay eggs on the underside of the leaves of the two species of host plants, where they are less conspicuous. The high mobility of G. rhamni enables the butterflies to find even the most isolated host plants in an area, which are more ideal for their offspring. Eggs are more likely to be deposited on outlying plants, leading to reduced vulnerability as fewer predators are attracted to these plants. Another factor is damage; undamaged plants indicate the absence of other eggs, as brimstone larvae leave holes in the leaves of the plants on which they feed. Since predators and parasites are attracted to damaged plants through chemical or visual signals, less damage leads to greater offspring survival since eggs are less likely to be detected. Plants exposed to both sunlight and the open lead to reduced chances of predation and parasitism as well, and are more accessible to adult butterflies. Larvae can also benefit from decreased host plant defences; juvenile plants and plants with late bud-bursts produce fewer toxic defence chemicals, as resources are directed more towards plant growth.

== Life cycle ==
The common brimstone is one of the longest-living butterflies, with a life expectancy ranging from 10 months to a year. Due to its hibernation and life cycle, it has one generation per year. Development from the laid egg to the emergence of the imago is approximately 50 days. However, the adult brimstone spends a large portion of its life in an overwintering state. The brimstone is highly mobile, feeding and travelling to regions ideal for hibernation during the late summer and fall, and returning to regions ideal for mating and egg-laying during the spring.

=== Egg ===
Adult Common Brimstones lay eggs singly on the underside of buckthorn leaves. The eggs are around 1.3 mm tall, and are spindle-shaped in appearance. The eggs change colour over time, initially having a greenish-white colouration, then progressively darker shades of yellow, and finally brown before hatching.

=== Caterpillar ===
The larvae of the common brimstone undergo five instars, initially having a length of 1.7 mm in the first instar and reaching up to 34.9 mm in length when fully grown. The caterpillars have a green colouration with white hairs and dark tubercules across its length. When they first hatch, they move to the top side of the leaves and eat them, leaving characteristic hole patterns in their host plants. During the day, they feed and then rest in the open, lying still on the midrib of leaves, where their colouration makes them difficult to distinguish.

=== Pupa ===
Pupation occurs over approximately two weeks. The pupae are 22.2-23.8 mm in length and have the appearance of a curled leaf, with pointed ends and bulges in the middle. The pupae are secured to stems and leaves using silk; a cremastral hook attaches to a silk padding, and a length of silk secures the pupae around its middle. The pupae have a primarily green colouration, but right before adult emergence for males, the wing areas turn yellow.

=== Adult ===
Adults emerge during the summer, from June to August, and continue to feed until September. The common brimstone hibernates for the next seven months of winter, remaining inactive until April, where they then emerge and proceed to reproduce and lay eggs. Adult brimstones are highly abundant for several months after their emergence from overwintering. The common brimstone has sexual dichromism, with males having a sulphur yellow wing colouration and females having a greenish-white wing colouration. Additionally, males have iridescent dorsal wings that change in colour and appearance under ultraviolet light, while females do not. Both males and females have orange spots in the discoidal cell of each wing, pink head and antennae, and a thorax covered in white hair.

Life cycle

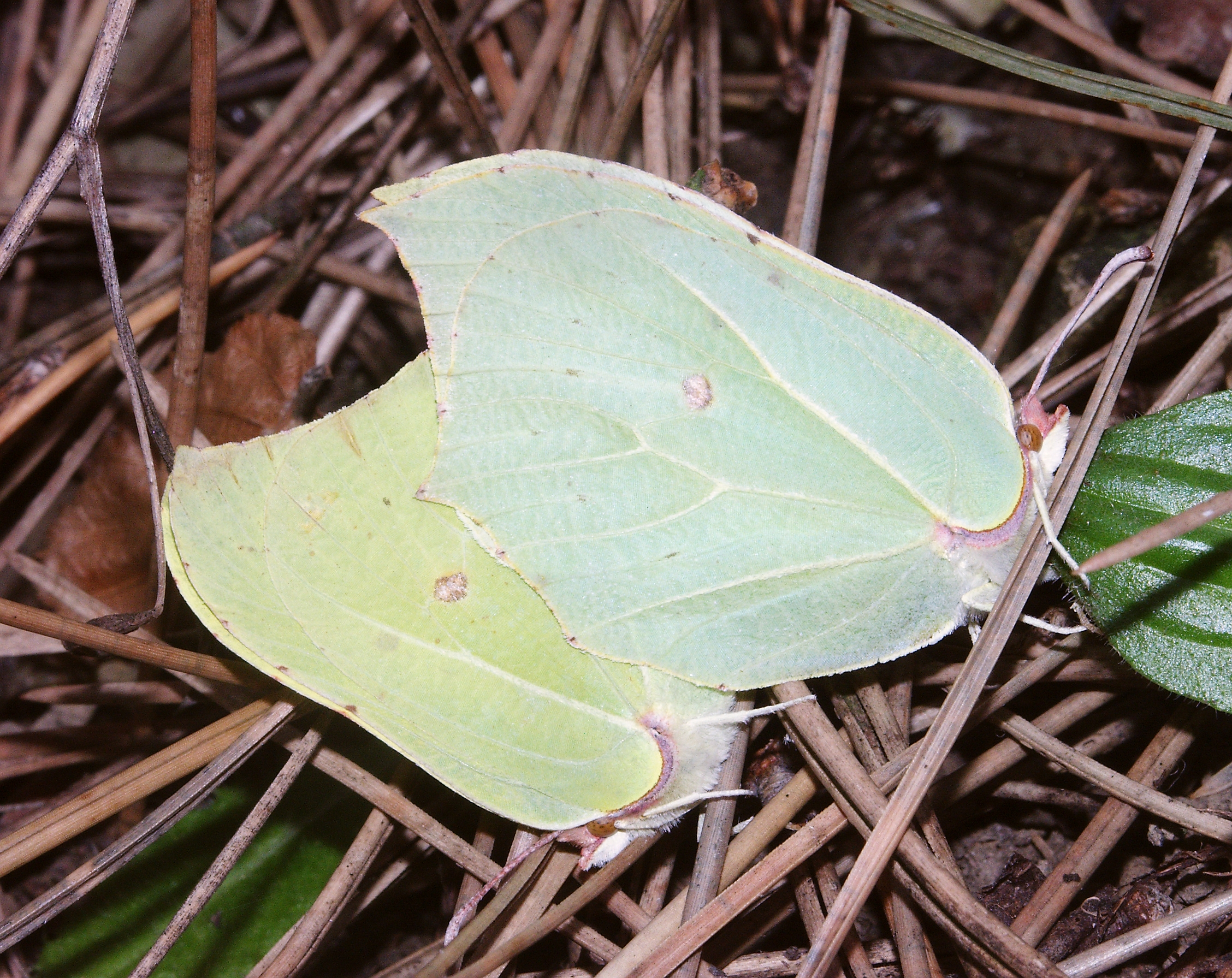
Mating pair (left: male; right: female)

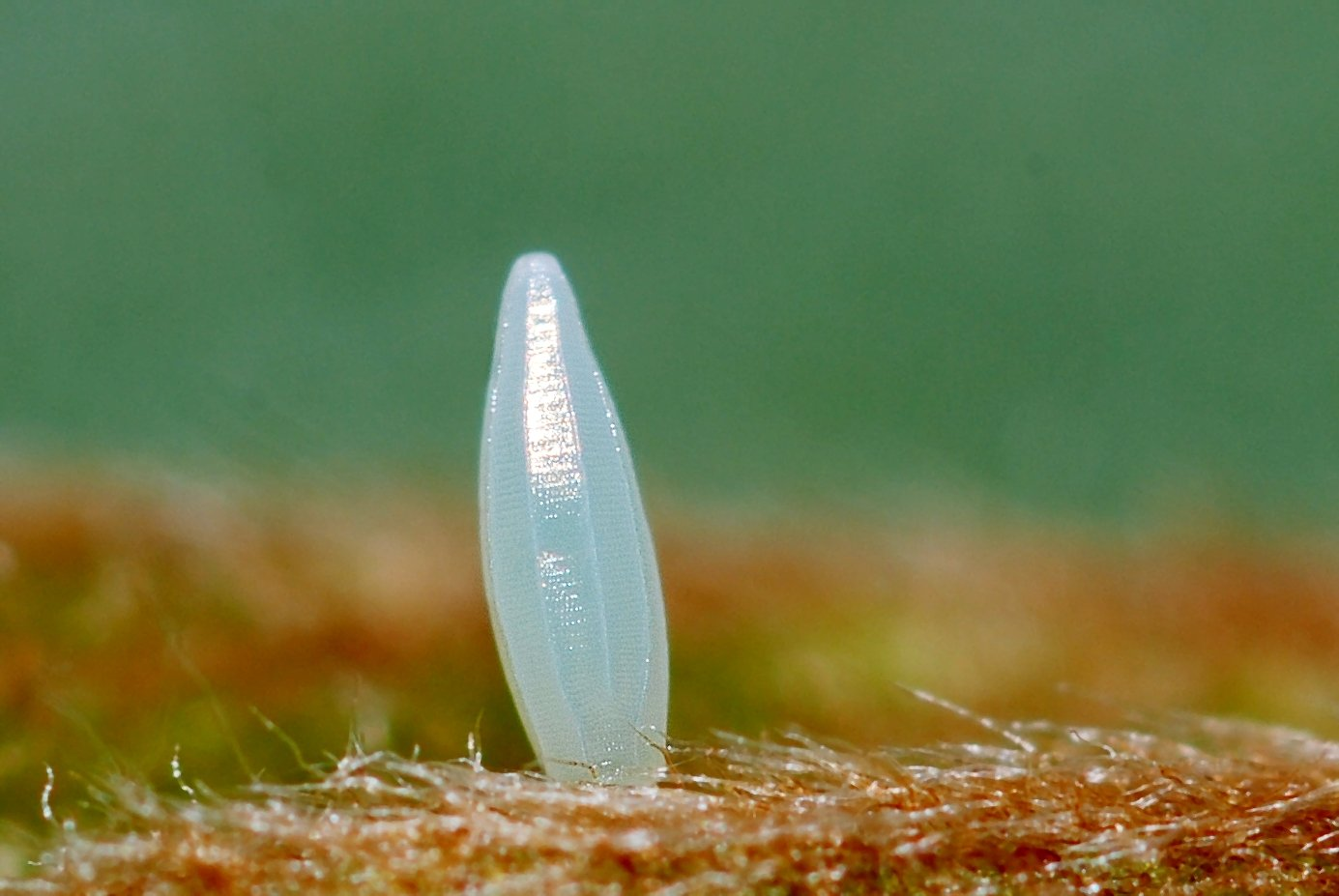
Egg

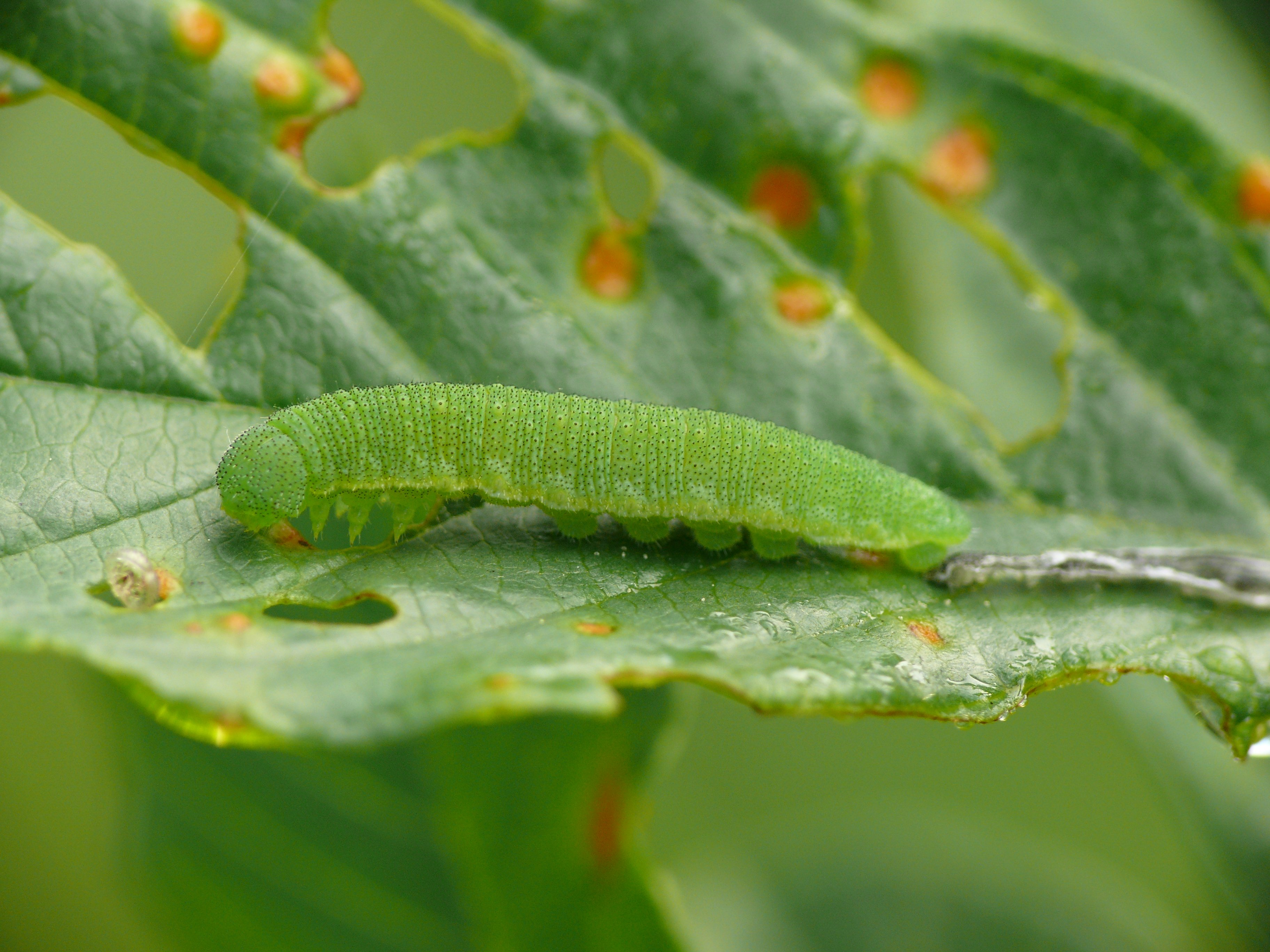
Caterpillar on alder buckthorn

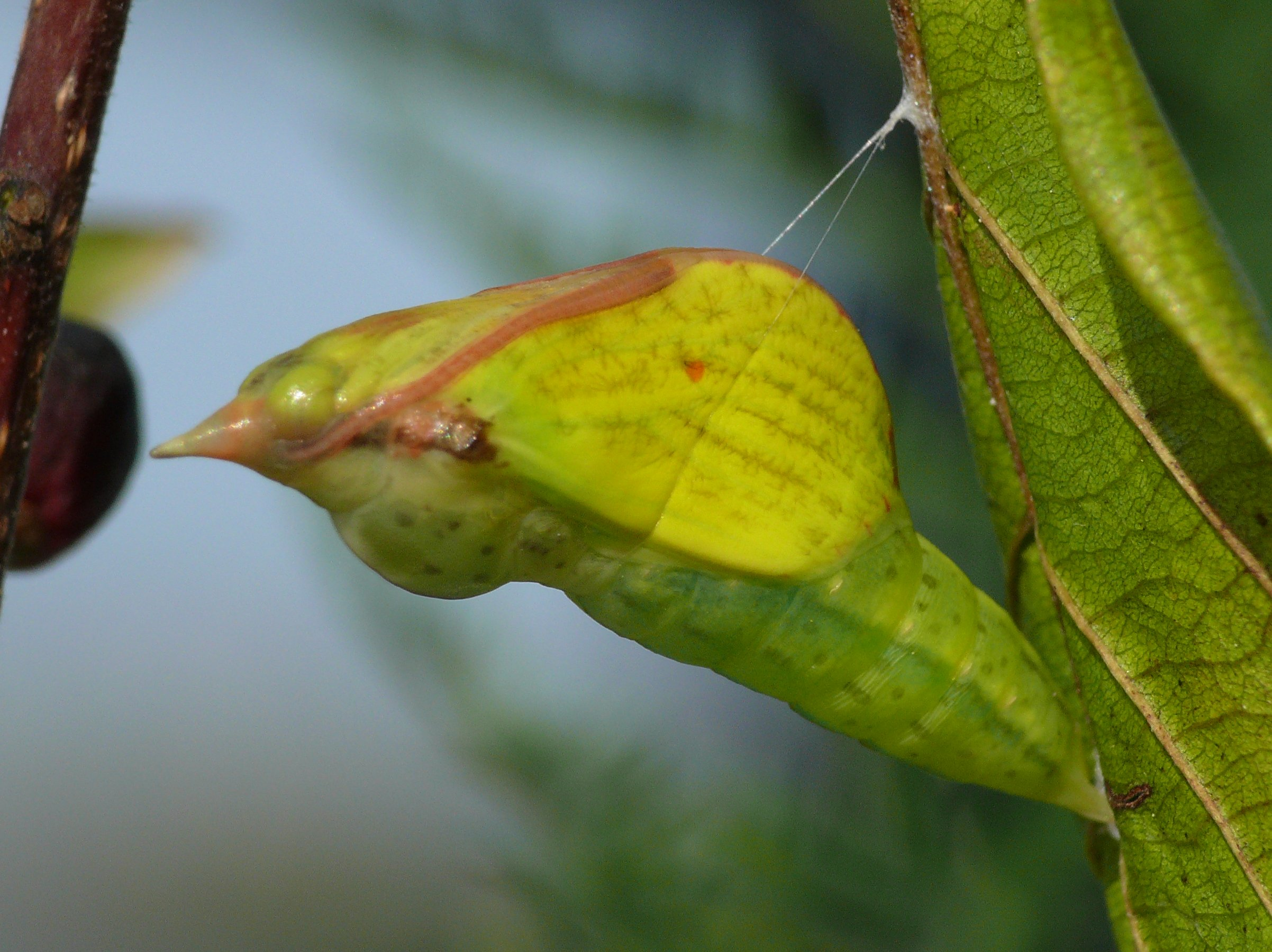
Pupa

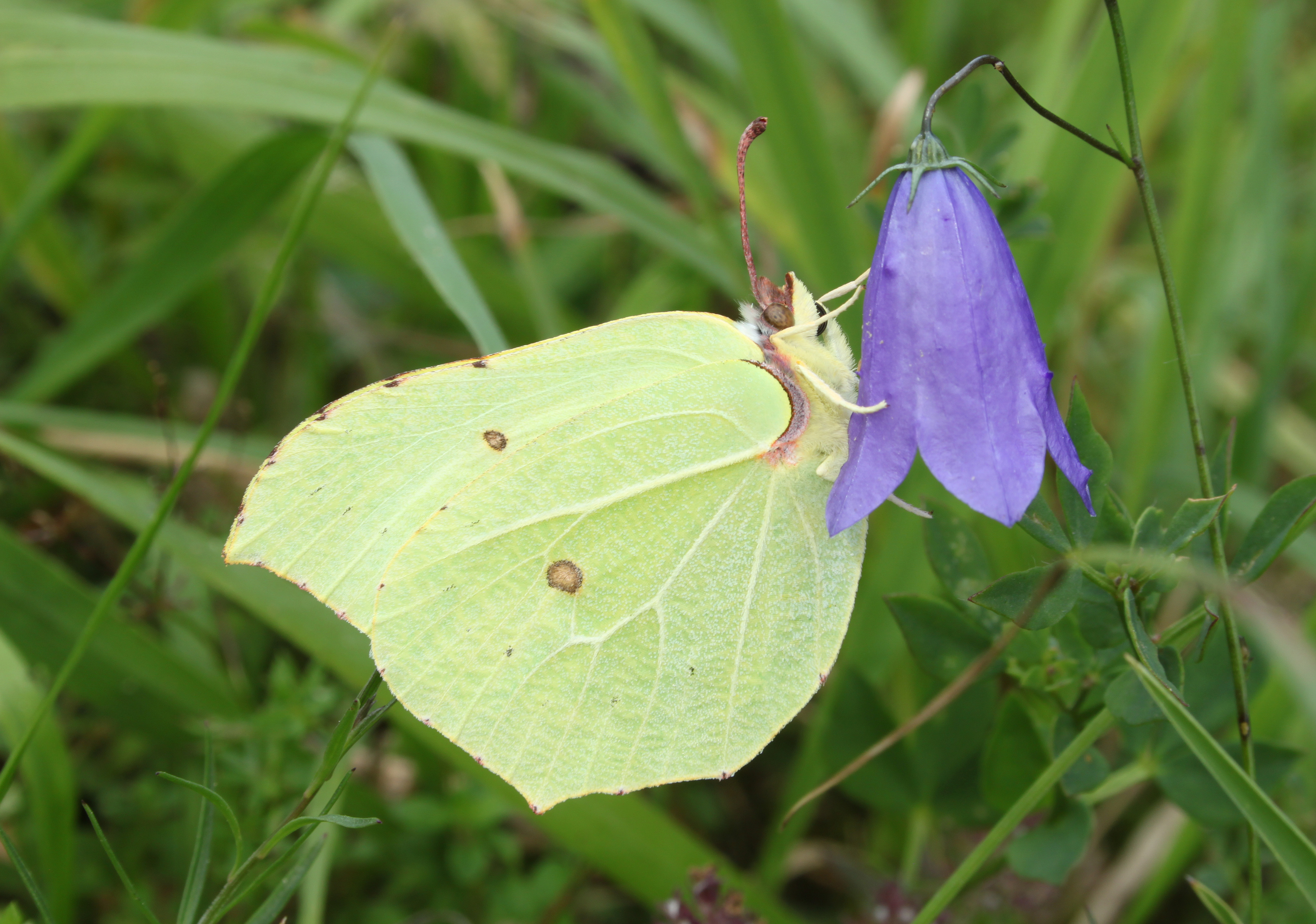
Adult male

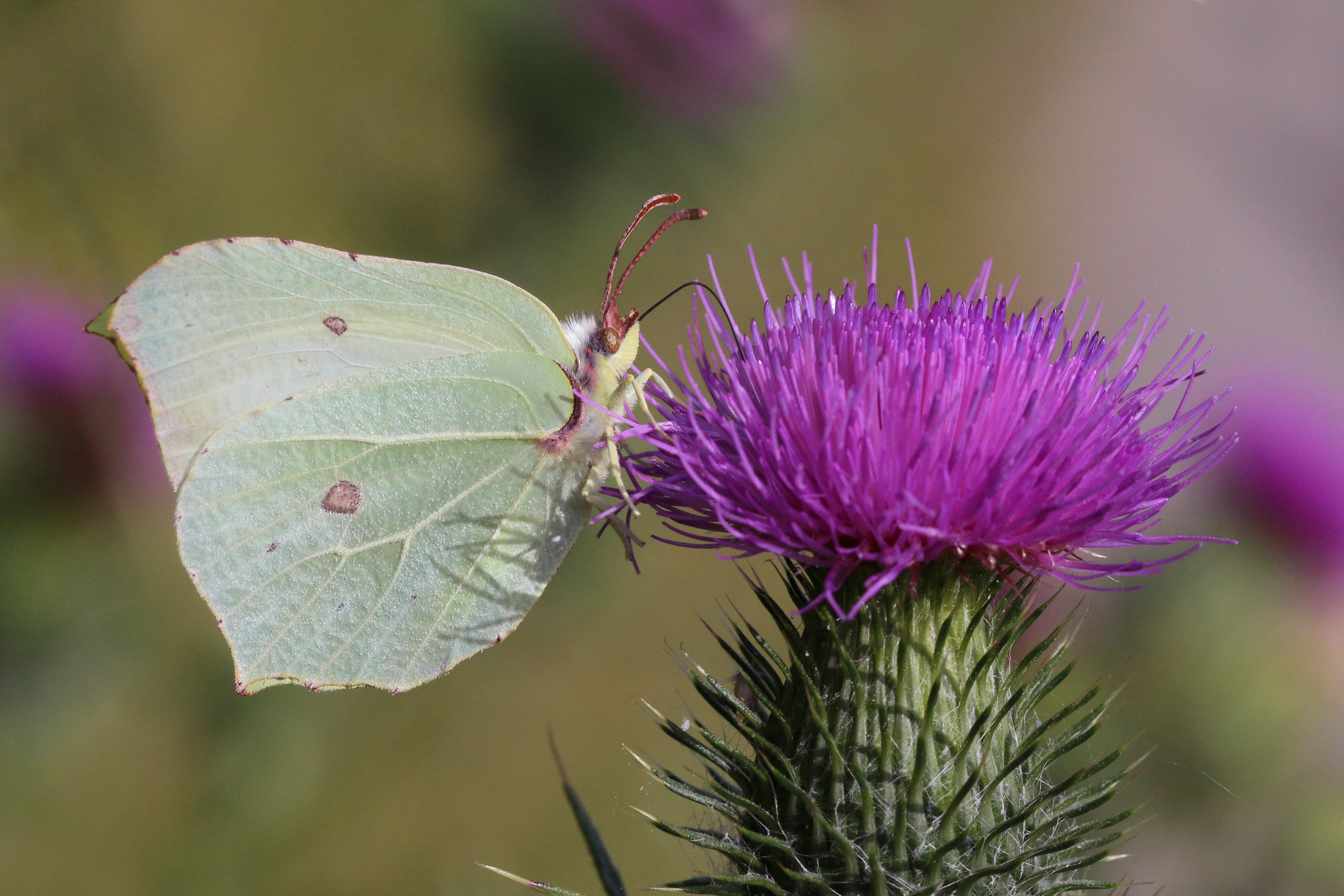
Adult female

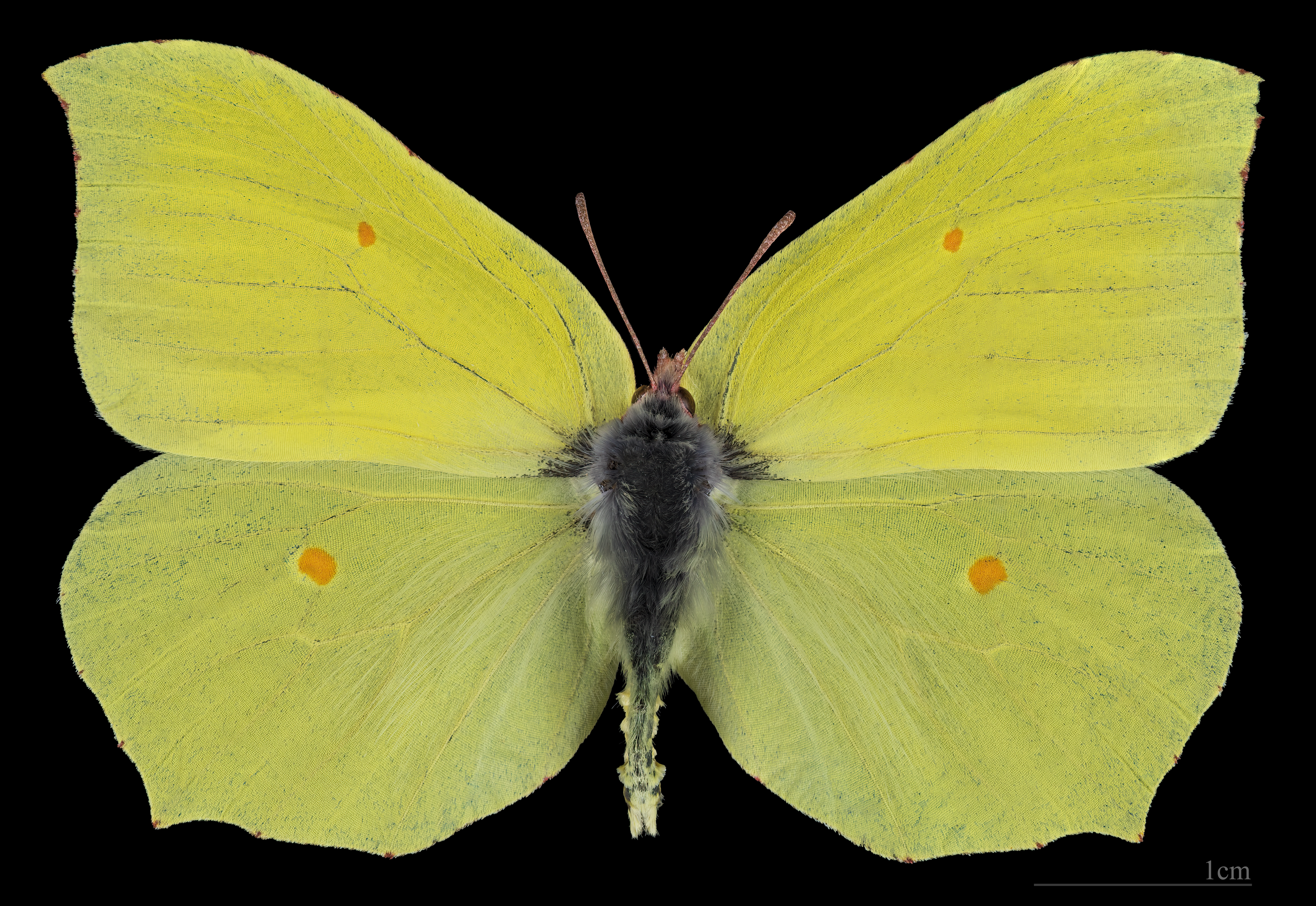
Gonepteryx rhamni ♂

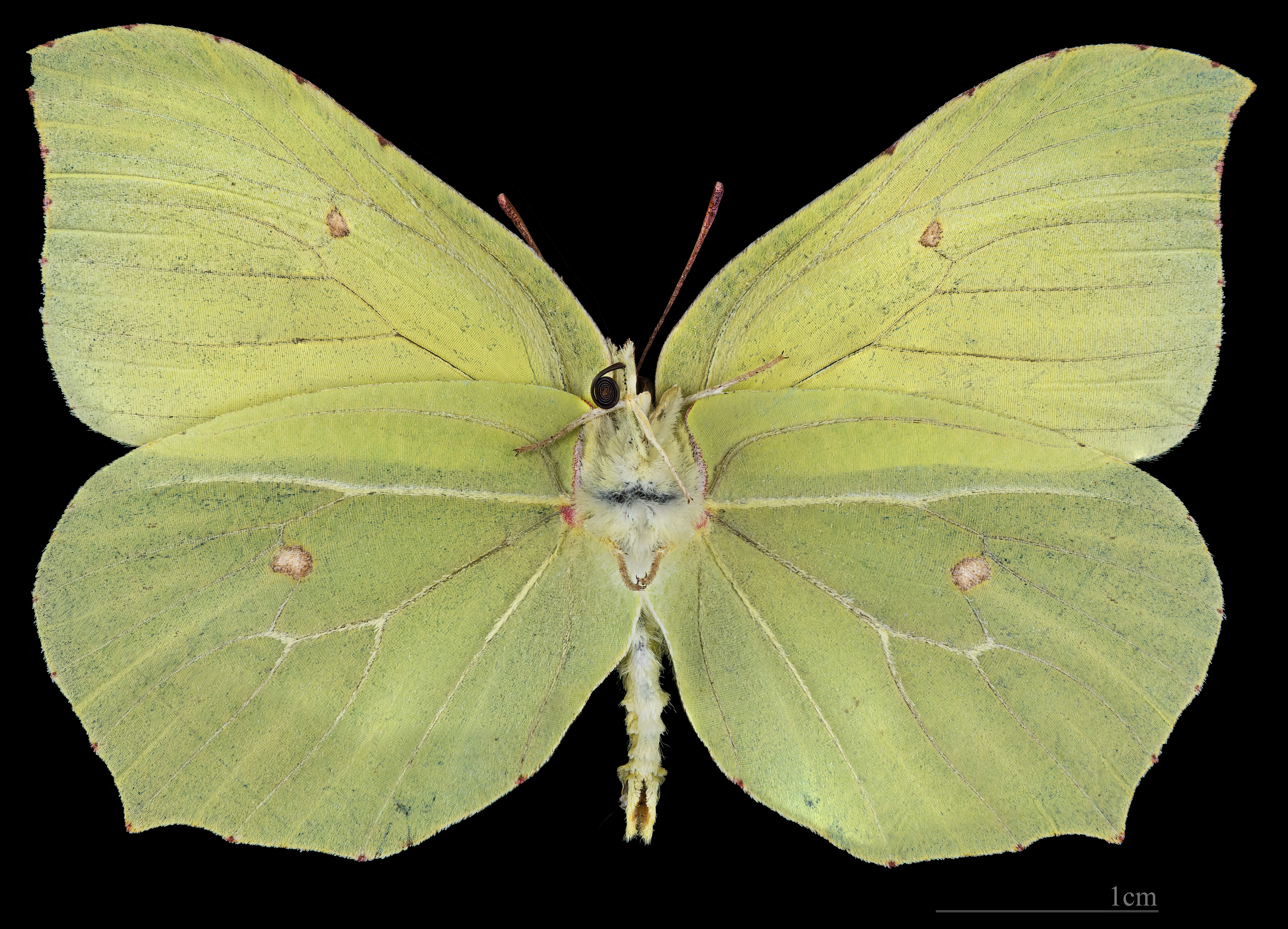
Gonepteryx rhamni ♂ △

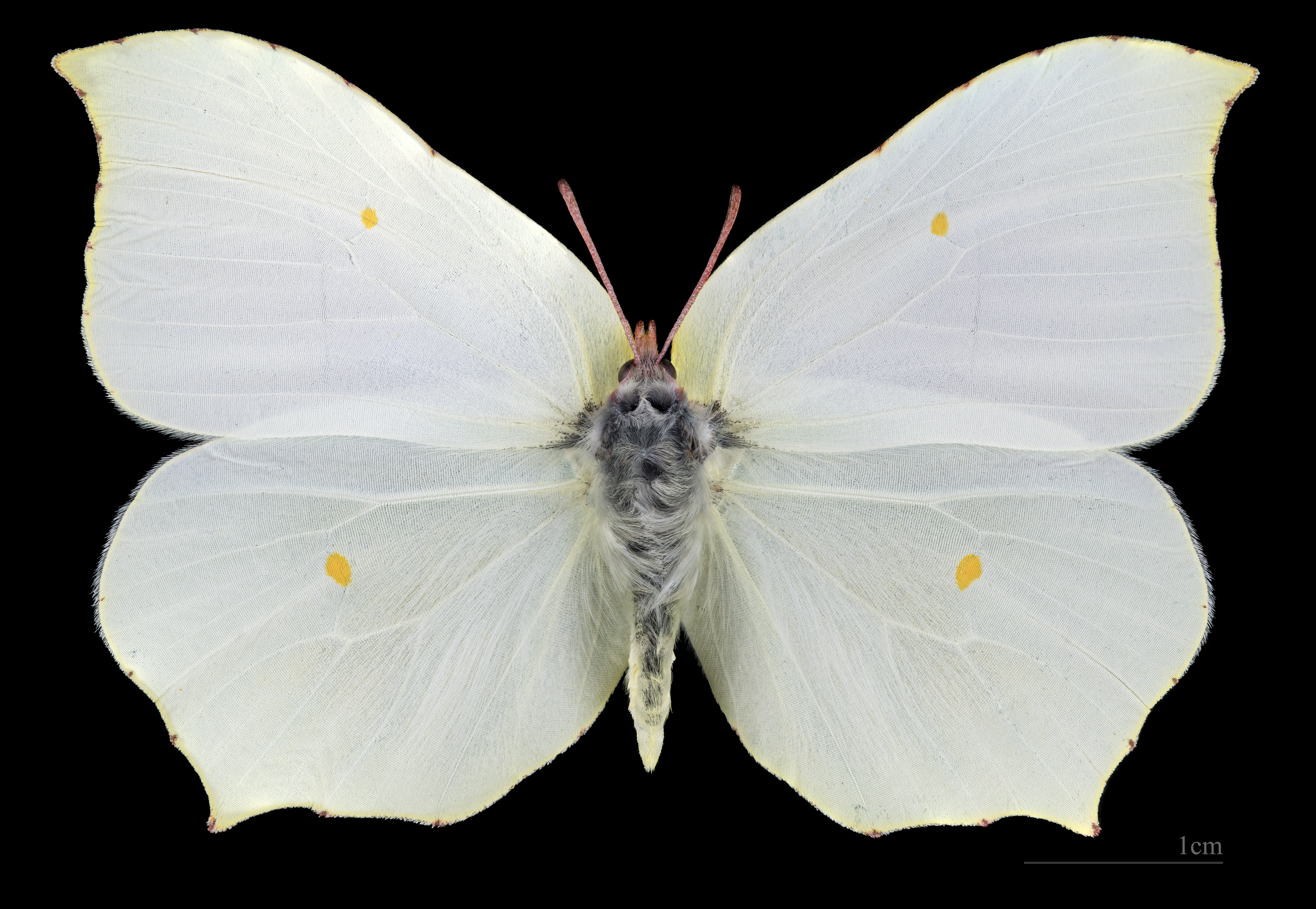
Gonepteryx rhamni ♀

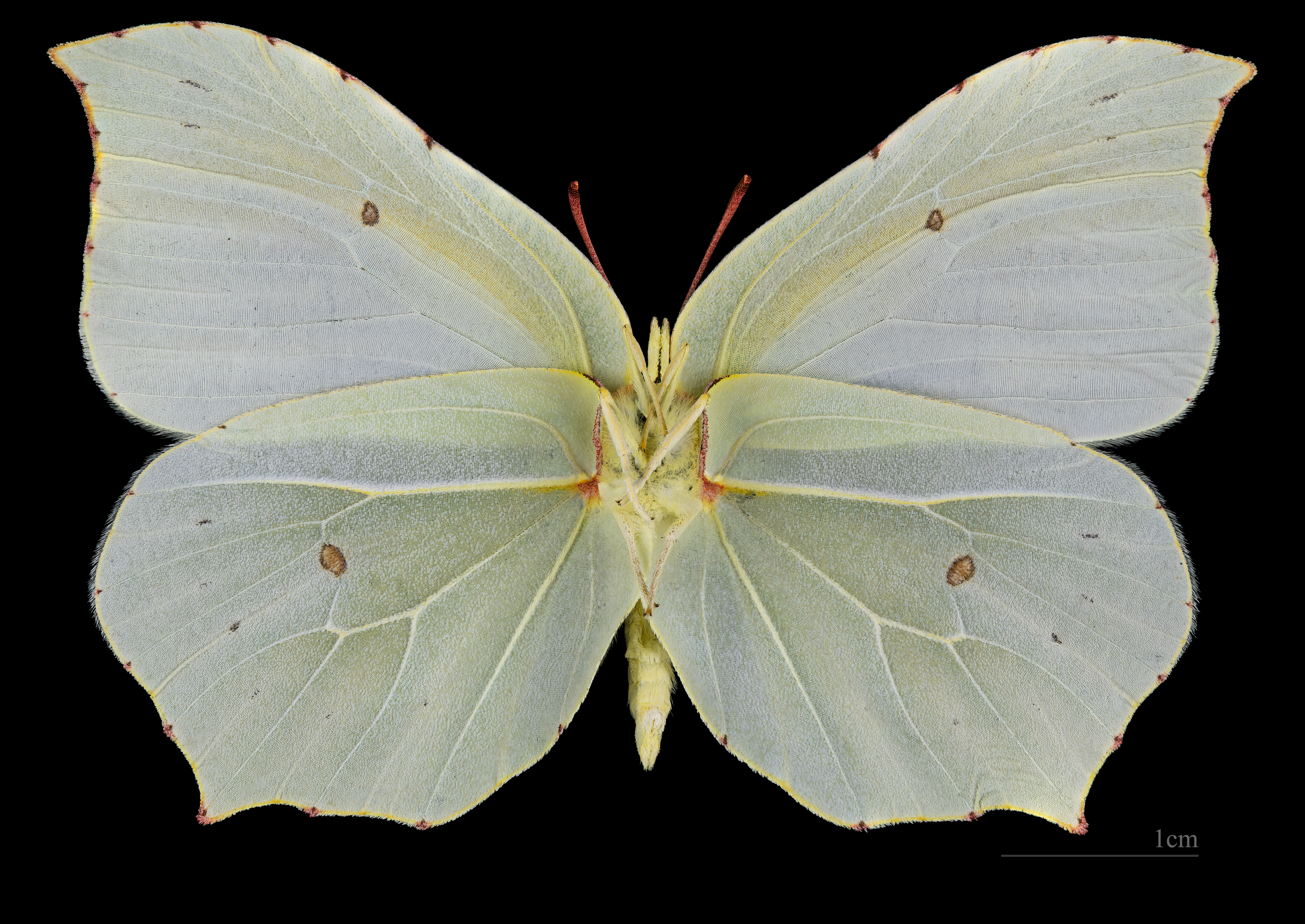
Gonepteryx rhamni ♀ △

== Migration ==
The common brimstone undergoes some regional migration between hibernation and breeding areas throughout the year, as seen in the different chemical composition of butterflies across varying seasons and regions. In general, there is movement towards wetlands to reproduce. After the eggs hatch, develop, and pupate, newly hatched adult butterflies emerge and disperse locally into both woodlands and wetlands to overwinter. Butterflies travel to the woodlands for overwintering, and no mating appears to occur within these habitats. Overwintering also occurs in the wetlands, where the host plant alder buckthorn is abundant. After emerging from overwintering, adult brimstones that were previously in the wetlands are joined by those that hibernated in woodlands, and the population breeds and lays eggs.

The environmental conditions of a particular year also affect migration, as seen in the elevational migrations of the common brimstone. Uphill migration is potentially influenced by habitat limitations, such as a lack of the forest cover that is required during overwintering. Brimstones travel to higher elevations for greater forest cover and reduced exposure to higher temperatures during their activities. Downhill migration is influenced by the need for larval resources such as host plants during breeding seasons - the butterflies travel to lower elevations in search for regions containing these plants, with adults commonly returning to the areas where they had been bred due to their long lifespan.

== Enemies ==
=== Predators ===
Like most woodland Lepidoptera, G. rhamni is preyed upon by many species of birds and wasps. Both larvae and adult brimstones fall victim to predation and use means such as protective coloration and mimicry to avoid this fate.

=== Parasites ===
The Common Brimstone has two recorded species of parasites: the braconids Cotesia gonopterygis and Cotesia risilis. These two species of parasitoid wasps are completely specialised for G. rhamni, possibly due to the wide distribution of the butterfly and the host plants in its habitats. The broad presence of its host allows the wasps to be host-specific. The wasps are primarily associated with the presence of the food plant Frangula alnus due to its association with their host.

== Protective colouration and behaviour ==
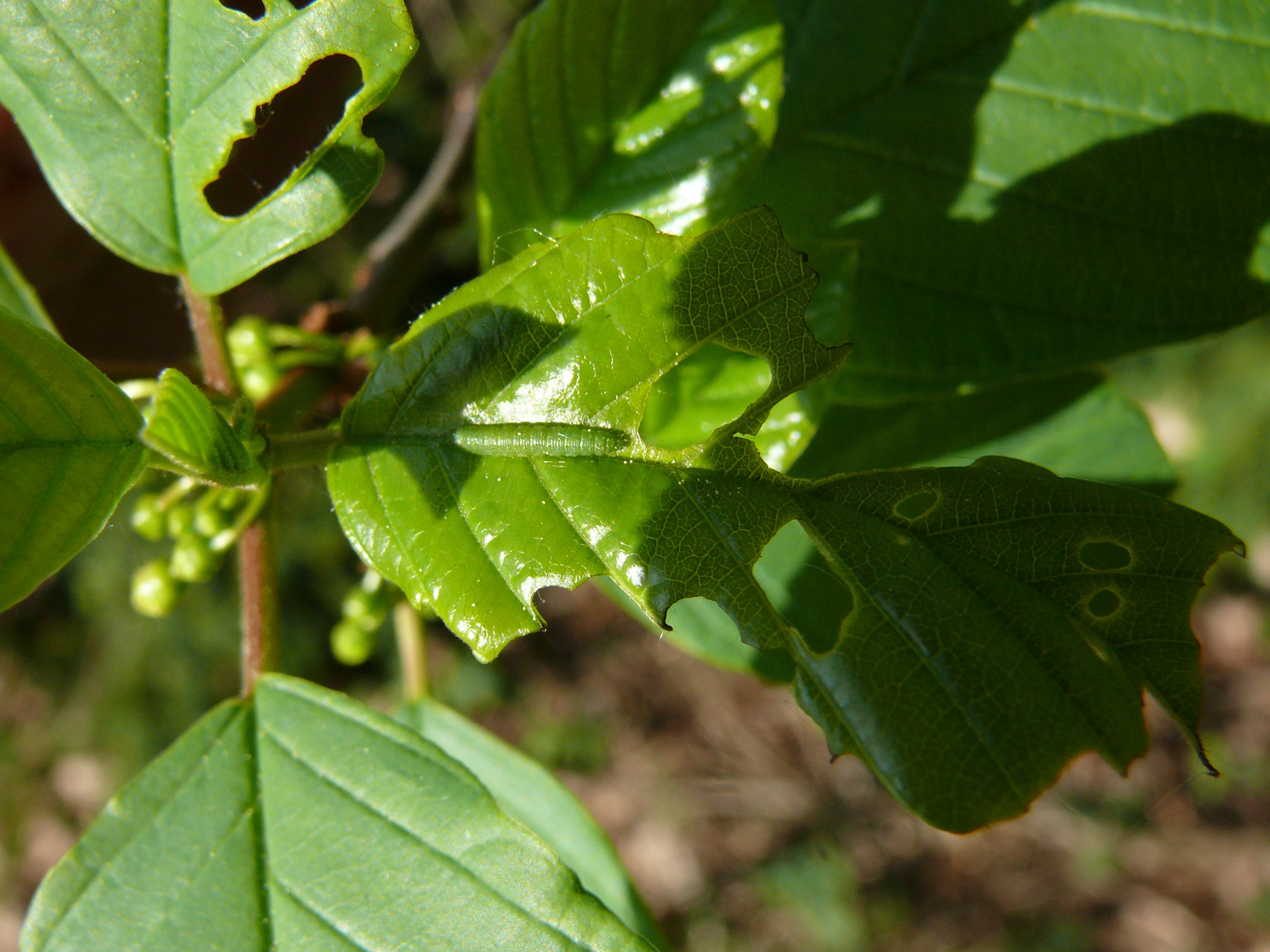
Larva lying alongside the midrib of a leaf

Both the larval and adult Common Brimstone exhibit cryptic colouration, meaning they match the colour of their habitats. Larvae are so difficult to see due to this colouration that they can remain in the open undetected. When not eating, the caterpillars remain still in a position alongside the midrib of leaves, making them even more difficult to spot. Adult brimstones are leaf-mimics, as they share similarities in shape, colour, and pattern to leaves. This allows them to blend in with their surroundings during vulnerable times like diapause (hibernation). When picked up, the butterflies become rigid and hide their legs from view in order to decrease their chances of being recognised.

== Genetics of colour patterns ==
=== Pigmentation and structural coloration ===
Variation in coloration of Lepidoptera wings is caused by different structural and pigment components. These differences cause light to scatter in different ways, leading to the different colours. In the common brimstone, wing scales scatter light incoherently due to ovoid-shaped structures called beads that contain pigments. Due to these pigments, the beads absorb short wavelength light and scatter longer wavelengths outside of the pigment absorption spectrum, such as light in the complementary wavelength range.

Through chemical extraction and analysis, two possible pigments have been identified that may contribute to the common brimstone's wing coloration. Xanthopterin is responsible for the sulphur yellow colour of the male wings since it absorbs in the violet range. Leucopterin was extracted from the white wings of females. The difference in wing pigmentation contributes to the distinct iridescence patterns of males and females. Iridescence occurs due to visualised changes in coloration from the scattering of ultraviolet light. A male-only pattern of coloration due to this iridescence is seen exclusively under ultraviolet light, since females absorb light on the ultraviolet spectra. The presence of exclusively leucopterin in female wings explains the lack of iridescence in female Common Brimstones, since leucopterin absorbs only in the ultraviolet range. Therefore, the wings do not reflect and consequently do not scatter any ultraviolet light like male wings do.

In males, iridescence is indicated in that the wing pattern appears to visually change depending on the position of the ultraviolet light shone onto the wing. At some angles, a male pattern is seen, while at other angles, a female lack of pattern is seen. This is referred to as the "gynandromorphic effect". This demonstrates that the pattern appears to be optical, rather than pigmental, as the effect is only seen at certain angles and distances of light and changes with positions. If it were pigmental, these changes would not cause differences in iridescence.

The structural coloration of the male dorsal wings is affected by environmental factors. There is an increase in ultraviolet coloration coverage with increasing temperature, increasing precipitation, and decreasing latitude. This has been possibly attributed to several factors, such as the greater abundance and quality of resources in areas with these environmental conditions. Other possibilities include a better ability to assimilate resources as an indication of male mate quality. Because ultraviolet coloration is energetically expensive to develop, it could signal high male quality.

== Mating ==
After the Common Brimstone emerges from hibernation, it travels towards habitats that contain larval host plants and mates. The brimstone is primarily monandrous, as demonstrated by the presence of usually only a single spermatophore in females throughout the mating season. Pairs are formed after the butterflies have engaged in a dalliance flight for a period of time. When a pair settles to mate, they do not take flight during copulation and remain paired for a long time of up to forty-eight hours.

== Physiology ==
=== Vision ===
The Common Brimstone appears to have an innate preference for certain colours in nectar plants – red and blue inflorescences are common in heavily used nectar sources in some regions. G. rhamni also has a stronger reliance on visual indications such as colour compared with other butterfly species, which rely more on odour.

=== Olfaction ===
The Common Brimstone has an antennal response to the floral scent compounds of nectar plants, where neural activity in antennal olfactory receptors occurs in the presence of certain compounds. Research suggests that there are antennal olfactory receptors for phenylacetaldehyde and the terpene compounds oxoisophoroneoxide, oxoisophorone, and dihydrooxoisophorone, as these compounds elicited some of the strongest electrophysiological responses whether they were presented in natural or synthetic mixes of floral compounds. Additionally, these two compounds are present in the largest quantities in the nectar plants utilised by the brimstone, indicating that scent detection could be important for detecting food sources. This would contribute to more efficient foraging in adult butterflies, as odour could act as a cue for finding and distinguishing nectar plants, allowing more energy to be utilised for other activities such as reproduction.

=== Diapause ===
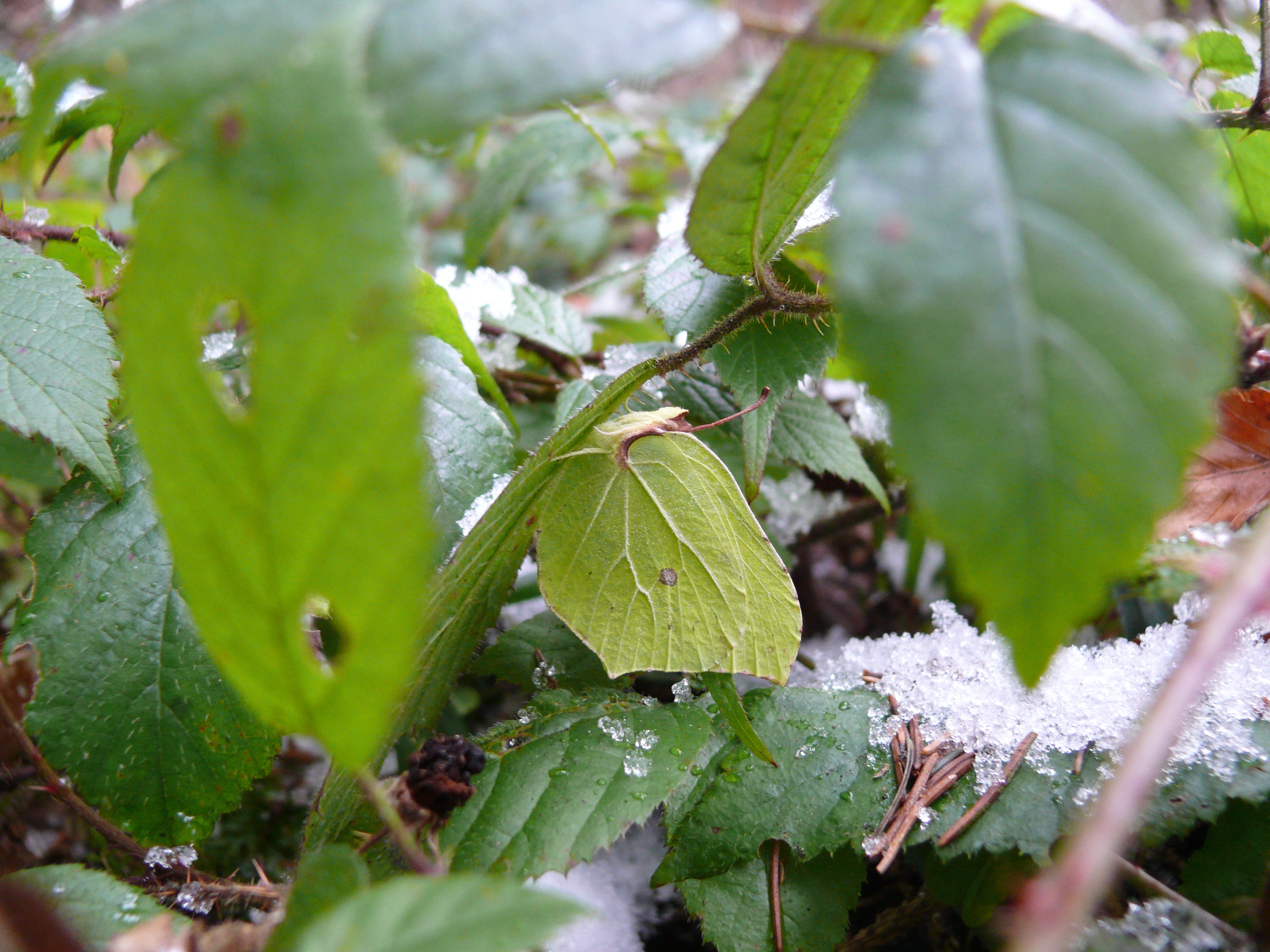
Hibernating adult male

The adult Common Brimstone overwinters for seven months, remaining hidden and motionless throughout its hibernation. While both sexes have similar egg to adult development times, they differ in the times that they reach sexual maturity. The reproductive development of males begins just after pupal emergence, and continues during hibernation, which indicates that males may not be able to reproduce until after overwintering. For females, eggs remain undeveloped as the butterflies overwinter, and no reproductive development occurs until after emergence from hibernation.

The sexes also differ in times of emergence after overwintering. Emergence is correlated with temperature and hours of sunlight; a certain amount of both is necessary for the butterfly to emerge from hibernation and therefore influences when diapause ends. Males emerge earlier than females, as they are more willing to fly in lower temperatures than females. Since the common brimstone most closely follows monandrous mating patterns, males may emerge earlier to increase the number of mating chances and therefore reproductive success, as older males have had more time to develop and therefore have a greater advantage. In contrast, females emerge late due to the late seasonal development of host plants such as the Alder Buckthorn, since these plants are necessary for egg-laying. Female emergence is correlated with host plant development.

== Conservation ==
As of 2010, G. rhamni does not appear to have a threatened conservation status according to IUCN standards. However, the butterfly has experienced significant population and distribution reduction in areas such as the Netherlands, where its numbers have declined to the point that based on IUCN criterion, it has reached endangered species status. The causes of this population decline are not fully determined, but there are several possible factors. Since the common brimstone is univoltine, it may have difficulties adapting to changing environmental conditions compared to species that have multiple generations a year. For example, there has been a decrease in suitable overwintering environments for the butterflies, with open woodland decreasing in favour of more urban areas. Nitrogen pollution, declining nectar supplies, and rapid ecological changes have also been suggested as other hypothetical factors. Concerns have been raised about the possible future increase of this population decline, but the butterfly mostly does not appear to be a conservation concern due to its widespread and common geographic presence.

== See also ==
- List of butterflies of Great Britain
- Brimstone moth
