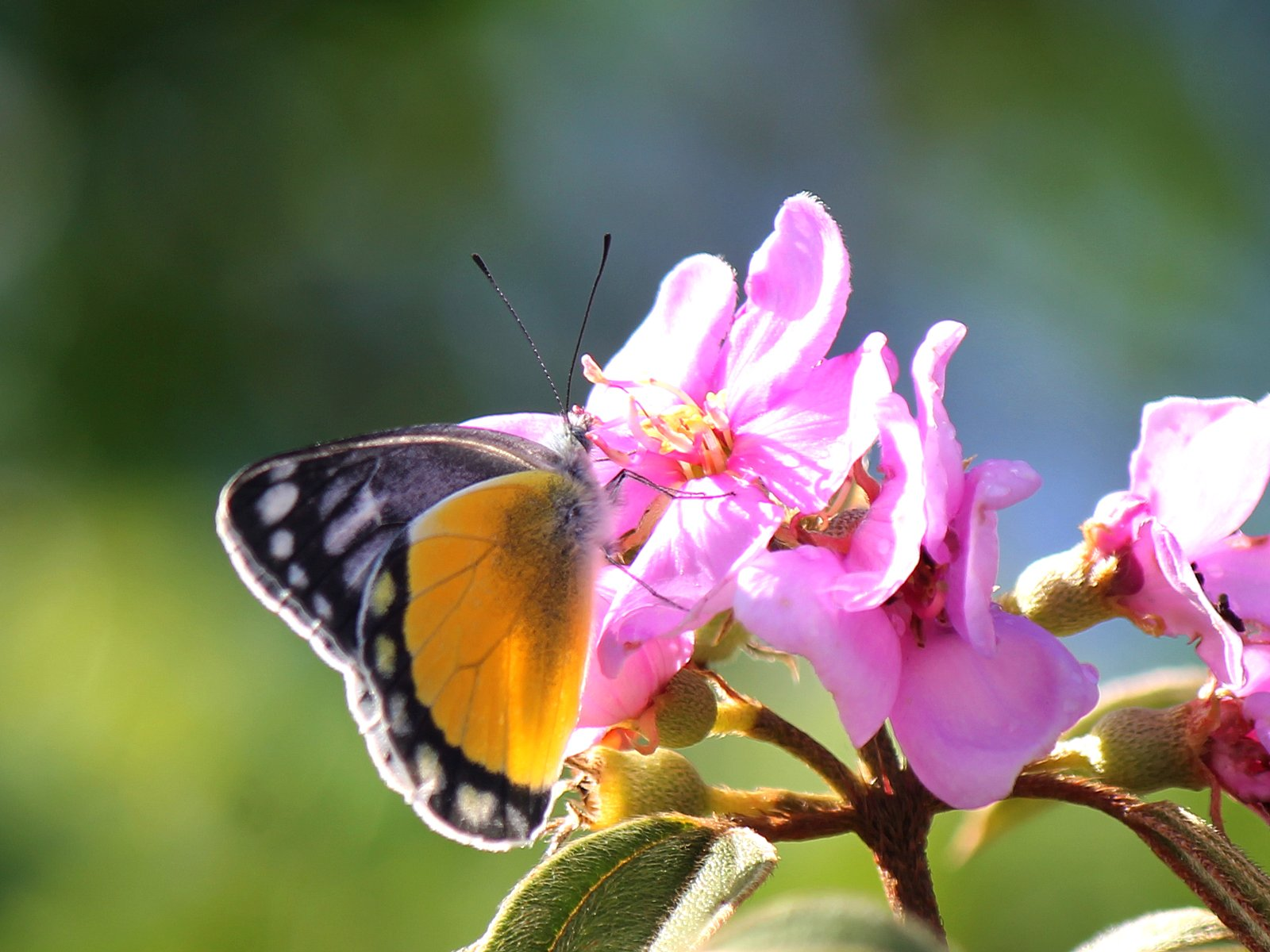

Scientific classification
- Kingdom: Animalia
- Phylum: Arthropoda
- Class: Insecta
- Order: Lepidoptera
- Family: Pieridae
- Genus: Delias
- Species: D. melusina

Binomial name
- Delias melusina Staudinger, 1890

= Delias melusina =

Species of butterfly

Delias melusina is a butterfly in the family Pieridae. It was described by Otto Staudinger in 1890. It is found in the Australasian realm, where it is endemic to Sulawesi.

The wingspan is about 78 mm. It has beneath some resemblance to echidna, but the whitish subapical spot of the forewing is absent. All the submarginal spots are strongly reduced, the base and the discal area of the forewing blue-grey. The upper surface is blue-white, with black areas on both wings.It is a mountain species.

== Taxonomy ==
melusina is a member of the dorimene species group.
