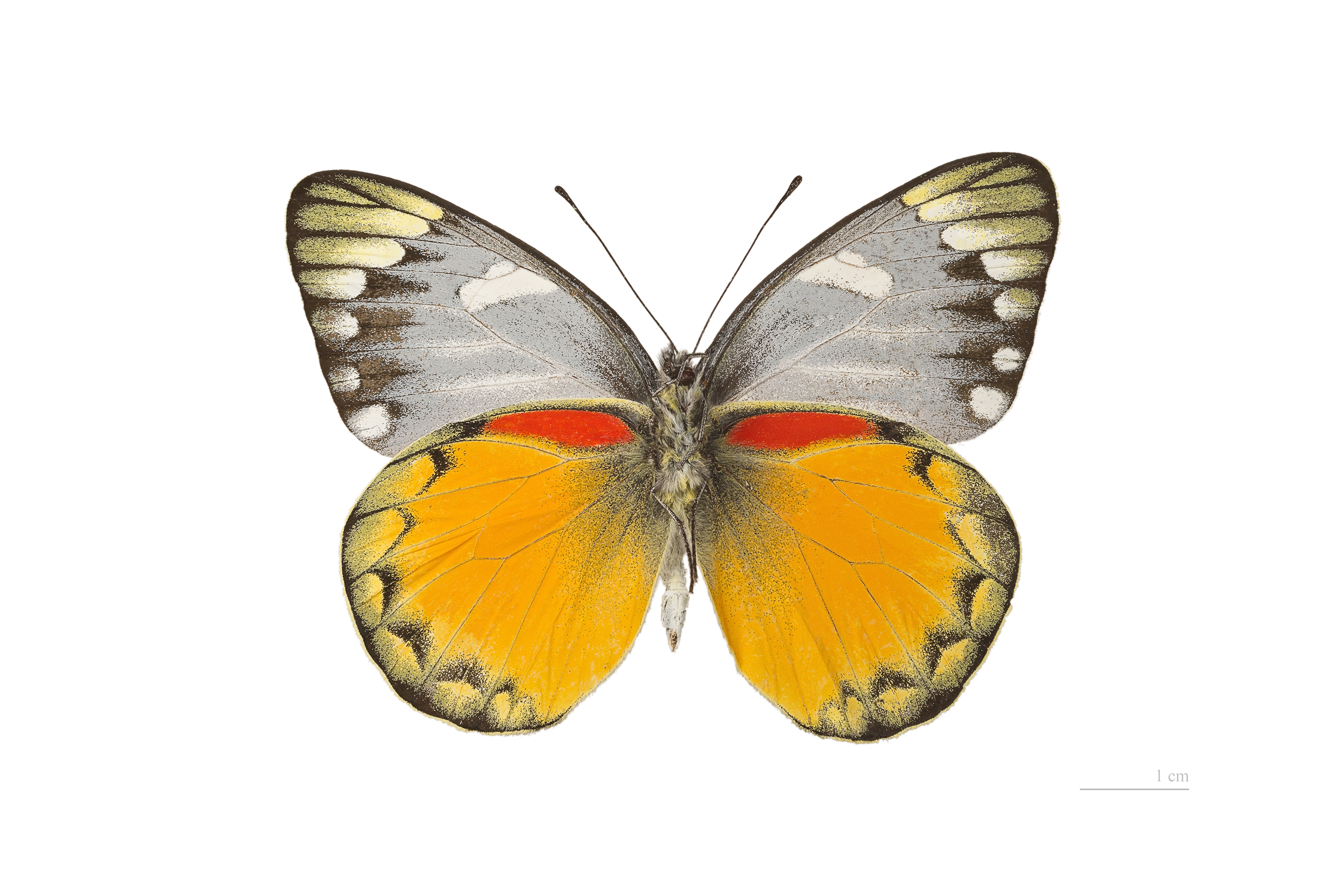
- Delias descombesi

Scientific classification
- Kingdom: Animalia
- Phylum: Arthropoda
- Clade: Pancrustacea
- Class: Insecta
- Order: Lepidoptera
- Family: Pieridae
- Tribe: Pierini
- Genus: Delias; Hübner, [1819]

Synonyms
- Cathaemia Hübner, [1819]; Symmachlas Hübner, [1821]; Harpanota Swainson, 1851; Thyca Wallengren, 1858; Piccarda Grote, 1900

= Delias =

Delias Temporal range: Miocene–Recent, inferred from molecular phylogeny

Genus of butterflies

Delias is a genus of butterflies. There are about 250 species of the genus Delias, found in South Asia and Australia.They are remarkable for the gay-coloured under surfaces of very many species which often show an altogether ideally beautiful arrangement of intensively coloured bands and spots. The Delias are a characteristic feature of the IndoAustralian fauna. They enliven the woods and their borders, as Appias and Catopsilia predominate at the river-banks, fly often round the tops of the forest-trees, are fond of resting on leaves and flowers (for instance on those of the Cinchona-tree, the Lantana) or in rarer cases speed over grassy plains in wild, irregular flight (battana in South Celebes). But most species fly slowly and quietly from flower to flower and often do not even leave the bush on which, frequently to the number of many hundreds, they emerged from the pupa (belisama on Java). Comparatively few species are distributed over large tracts of country, most remain local or insular; they are inclined to geographical variation, even on the same island (bromo, fruhstorferi in East Java and crithoe, momiea in West Java, which are so different that they were described as separate species). But they are by no means particular as to their place of flight and we meet with them at the seashore in mangrove thickets (from whence they often fly out even over the sea), on the high volcanoes of the Malayan Archipelago and in the Himalayas, where they are common up to 8,000 ft (2,400 m), but also ascend to 10,000–11,000 ft (3,000–3,400 m). The eggs are laid on the underside of leaves, often 20–30 in parallel rows. Larva cylindrical with two rows of long hairs, lives on mistletoe (Loranthus longiflorus); but one species (eucharis) was also observed on Hibiscus chinensis. Pupal stage usually lasts 10 days, pupa fastened at the end of the tail, with the head upwards, often very abundant on tree-trunks, branches and even walls.

The genus is considered to have its evolutionary origins in the Australian region.

== Species ==
- The singhapura species group
  - Delias agoranis Grose-Smith, 1887
  - Delias kuehni Honrath, 1887 (or Delias kuhni)
  - Delias singhapura (Wallace, 1867)
  - Delias themis (Hewitson, 1861)
- The nysa species group
  - Delias battana Fruhstorfer, 1896 Sulawesi
  - Delias blanca (Felder, C & R Felder, 1862) Philippines and Borneo
  - Delias dice (van Vollenhoven, 1865)
  - Delias dumasi Rothschild, 1925 Buru
  - Delias enniana Oberthür, 1880
  - Delias fruhstorferi (Honrath, 1891)
  - Delias ganymedes Okumoto, 1981
  - Delias georgina (Felder, C & R Felder, 1861)
  - Delias hempeli Dannatt, 1904 Halmaheira
  - Delias lemoulti Talbot, 1931 Timor
  - Delias manuselensis Talbot, 1920 Serang, Ambon
  - Delias maudei Joicey & Noakes, 1915 Biak
  - Delias momea (Boisduval, 1836) Sumatra, Java
  - Delias nuydaorum Schröder, H, 1975
  - Delias nysa (Fabricius, 1775)
  - Delias pulla Talbot, 1937 New Guinea
  - Delias ribbei Röber, 1886 Aru
  - Delias schoenigi Schröder, H, 1975
  - Delias schuppi Talbot, 1928 Serang
  - Delias vietnamensis Monastyrskii & Devyatkin, 2000 Vietnam, Cambodia
  - Delias waterstradti Rothschild, 1915 Halmaheira
- The chrysomelaena species group
  - Delias caliban Grose-Smith, 1897
  - Delias chrysomelaena (van Vollenhoven, 1866) Halmahera, Bachan
  - Delias ladas Grose-Smith, 1894
  - Delias talboti Joicey & Noakes, 1915 Biak
  - Delias totila Heller, 1896 New Britain
- The stresemanni species group
  - Delias lecerfi Joicey & Talbot, 1922 New Guinea
  - Delias schmassmanni Joicey & Talbot, 1923 Buru
  - Delias stresemanni Rothschild, 1915 Serang
- The geraldina species group
  - Delias abrophora Roepke, 1955 New Guinea
  - Delias anjae Schroder, 1977
  - Delias argentata Roepke, 1955 New Guinea
  - Delias aroae (Ribbe, 1900)
  - Delias cuningputi (Ribbe, 1900) New Guinea
  - Delias jordani Kenrick, 1909
  - Delias daniensis van Mastrigt, 2003 New Guinea
  - Delias destrigata van Mastrigt, 1996 New Guinea
  - Delias dortheysi van Mastrigt, 2002 New Guinea
  - Delias eudiabolus Rothschild, 1915 New Guinea
  - Delias fascelis Jordan, 1912 New Guinea
  - Delias geraldina Grose-Smith, 1894
  - Delias heroni Kenrick, 1909
  - Delias hikarui Yagishita, 1993 New Guinea
  - Delias hypomelas Rothschild & Jordan, 1907
  - Delias imitator Kenrick, 1911 New Guinea
  - Delias inopinata Lachlan, 2000 New Guinea
  - Delias itamputi Ribbe, 1900
  - Delias langda Gerrits & van Mastrigt, 1992 New Guinea
  - Delias microsticha Rothschild, 1904
  - Delias nigropunctata Joicey & Noakes, 1915 New Guinea
  - Delias oktanglap van Mastrigt, 1990 New Guinea
  - Delias pheres Jordan, 1912 New Guinea
  - Delias kenricki Talbot, 1937
  - Delias rileyi Joicey & Talbot, 1922 New Guinea
  - Delias sagessa Fruhstorfer, 1910
  - Delias sinak Mastrigt, 1990 New Guinea
  - Delias sphenodiscus Roepke, 1955 New Guinea
  - Delias subapicalis Orr & Sibatani, 1985 New Guinea
  - Delias takashii Sakuma, 1999 New Guinea
  - Delias thompsoni Joicey & Talbot, 1916 New Guinea
- The eichhorni species group
  - Delias antara Roepke, 1955 New Guinea
  - Delias carstensziana Rothschild, 1915 New Guinea
  - Delias catisa Jordan, 1912 New Guinea
  - Delias eichhorni Rothschild, 1904
  - Delias frater Jordan, 1912 New Guinea
  - Delias germana Roepke, 1955
  - Delias gilliardi Sanford & Bennett, 1955 New Guinea
  - Delias hallstromi Sanford & Bennett, 1955
  - Delias leucobalia Jordan, 1912 New Guinea
  - Delias muliensis Morinaka, van Mastrigt & Sibatani, 1991 New Guinea
  - Delias mullerensis Morinaka & Nakazawa, 1999
  - Delias toxopei Roepke, 1955 New Guinea
- The bornemanni species group
  - Delias bornemanni Ribbe, 1900 New Guinea
  - Delias caroli Kenrick, 1909
  - Delias castaneus Kenrick, 1909
  - Delias nais Jordan, 1912
  - Delias pratti Kenrick, 1909
  - Delias maaikeae Davenport, Pequin, De Vries, 2017 New Guinea
- The iltis species group
  - Delias arabuana Roepke, 1955 New Guinea
  - Delias awongkor van Mastrigt, 1989 New Guinea
  - Delias bakeri Kenrick, 1909
  - Delias callista Jordan, 1912 New Guinea
  - Delias flavistriga Roepke, 1955 New Guinea
  - Delias iltis Ribbe, 1900
  - Delias luctuosa Jordan, 1912 New Guinea
  - Delias mesoblema Jordan, 1912
  - Delias raymondi Schröder & Treadaway, 1982 New Guinea
- The weiskei species group
  - Delias callima Rothschild & Jordan, 1905 New Guinea
  - Delias campbelli Joicey & Talbot, 1922 New Guinea
  - Delias hapalina Jordan, 1912 New Guinea
  - Delias leucias Jordan, 1912 New Guinea
  - Delias marguerita Joicey & Talbot, 1922 New Guinea
  - Delias nieuwenhuisi van Mastrigt, 1990 New Guinea
  - Delias phippsi Joicey & Talbot, 1922 New Guinea
  - Delias pseudomarguerita Gerrits & van Mastrigt, 1992 New Guinea
  - Delias rosamontana Roepke, 1955 New Guinea
  - Delias tessei Joicey & Talbot, 1916 New Guinea
  - Delias virgo Gerrits & van Mastrigt, 1992 New Guinea
  - Delias weiskei Ribbe, 1900
- The kummeri species group
  - Delias alepa Jordan, 1912 New Guinea
  - Delias bothwelli Kenrick, 1909
  - Delias dixeyi Kenrick, 1909
  - Delias isocharis Rothschild & Jordan, 1907
  - Delias kummeri Ribbe, 1900
  - Delias ligata Rothschild, 1904
  - Delias strix Yagishita, 1993 New Guinea
- The nigrina species group
  - Delias buruana Rothschild, 1899 Buru, Serang
  - Delias dohertyi (Oberthür, 1894)
  - Delias duris (Hewitson, 1861)
  - Delias eximia Rothschild, 1925 New Ireland
  - Delias funerea Rothschild, 1894
  - Delias joiceyi Talbot, 1920 Serang
  - Delias nigrina (Fabricius, 1775)
  - Delias ornytion (Godman & Salvin, 1881) New Guinea, Waigeu
  - Delias prouti Joicey & Talbot, 1923 Buru
  - Delias wollastoni Rothschild, 1915 New Guinea
- The belladonna species group
  - Delias belladonna (Fabricius, 1793)
  - Delias benasu Martin, L, 1913 Sulawesi
  - Delias berinda (Moore, 1872)
  - Delias lativitta Leech, 1893
  - Delias patrua Leech, 1890 Tibet, China, Burma
  - Delias sanaca (Moore, 1857)
  - Delias subnubila Leech, 1893 China
  - Delias wilemani Jordan, 1925
- The aglaia/pasithoe species group
  - Delias acalis (Godart, 1819)
  - Delias crithoe (Guérin-Méneville & Percheron, 1835) Java, Sumatra, Sumbawa, Sumba
  - Delias pasithoe (Linnaeus, 1767)
  - Delias henningia (Eschscholtz, 1821)
  - Delias ninus (Wallace, 1867)
  - Delias woodi Talbot, 1928
- The albertisi species group
  - Delias albertisi (Oberthür, 1880)
  - Delias discus Honrath, 1886 New Guinea
  - Delias putih van Mastrigt, 1995
  - Delias telefominensis Yagishita, 1993 New Guinea
- The clathrata species group
  - Delias autumnalis Roepke, 1955 New Guinea
  - Delias bobaga van Mastrigt, 1996 New Guinea
  - Delias catocausta Jordan, 1912 New Guinea
  - Delias clathrata Rothschild, 1904
  - Delias elongatus Kenrick, 1911 New Guinea
  - Delias fioretti van Mastrigt, 1996 New Guinea
  - Delias hiemalis Roepke, 1955 New Guinea
  - Delias hemianops Gerrits & van Mastrigt, 1992 New Guinea
  - Delias inexpectata Rothschild, 1915 New Guinea
  - Delias klossi Rothschild, 1915 New Guinea
  - Delias mariae Joicey & Talbot, 1916 New Guinea
  - Delias menooensis Joicey & Talbot, 1922 New Guinea
  - Delias mira Rothschild, 1904
  - Delias nakanokeikoae Yagishita, 1993 New Guinea
  - Delias neeltje Gerrits & van Mastrigt, 1992 New Guinea
  - Delias roepkei Sanford & Bennett, 1955 New Guinea
  - Delias sawyeri van Mastrigt, 2000 New Guinea
  - Delias sigit van Mastrigt, 1990 New Guinea
  - Delias walshae Roepke, 1955 New Guinea
- The niepelti species group
  - Delias anamesa Bennett, 1956
  - Delias meeki Rothschild, 1904
  - Delias niepelti Ribbe, 1900
- The belisama species group
  - Delias aganippe (Donovan, 1805)
  - Delias apoensis Talbot, 1928
  - Delias aruna (Boisduval, 1832)
  - Delias aurantia Doherty, 1891 Java
  - Delias belisama (Cramer, 1779)
  - Delias descombesi (Boisduval, 1836)
  - Delias diaphana Semper, G, 1878
  - Delias ellipsis de Joannis, 1901 New Caledonia
  - Delias eumolpe Grose-Smith, 1889
  - Delias harpalyce (Donovan, 1805)
  - Delias levicki Rothschild, 1927
  - Delias madetes (Godman & Salvin, 1878)
  - Delias oraia Doherty, 1891
  - Delias splendida Rothschild, 1894
  - Delias zebuda (Hewitson, 1862)
- The dorimene species group
  - Delias agostina (Hewitson, 1852)
  - Delias alberti Rothschild, 1904
  - Delias apatela Joicey & Talbot, 1923 Buru
  - Delias baracasa Semper, G, 1890
  - Delias biaka Joicey & Noakes, 1915 Biak
  - Delias dorimene (Stoll, 1782)
  - Delias dorylaea (Felder, C & R Felder, 1865) Java
  - Delias echidna (Hewitson, 1861)
  - Delias eileenae Joicey & Talbot, 1927 Timor
  - Delias gabia (Boisduval, 1832)
  - Delias hippodamia (Wallace, 1867)
  - Delias mavroneria Fruhstorfer, 1914 New Guinea
  - Delias melusina Staudinger, 1890
  - Delias narses Heller, 1896 New Britain, New Ireland
  - Delias rothschildi Holland, W, 1900
  - Delias subviridis Joicey & Talbot, 1922 Serang
- The isse species group
  - Delias bosnikiana Joicey & Noakes, 1915 Biak
  - Delias candida (van Vollenhoven, 1865)
  - Delias ennia (Wallace, 1867)
  - Delias isse (Cramer, 1775)
  - Delias lytaea (Godman & Salvin, 1878) New Britain, New Ireland, New Georgia Group
  - Delias periboea (Godart, 1819)
  - Delias sacha Grose-Smith, 1895
- The hyparete species group
  - Delias argenthona (Fabricius, 1793)
  - Delias bagoe (Boisduval, 1832)
  - Delias ceneus (Linnaeus, 1758)
  - Delias edela Fruhstorfer, 1910
  - Delias eucharis (Drury, 1773)
  - Delias euphemia Grose-Smith, 1894
  - Delias fasciata Rothschild, 1894
  - Delias doylei Sanford & Bennett, 1955 New Guinea
  - Delias hyparete (Linnaeus, 1758)
  - Delias mitisi Staudinger, 1895 Sula, Banggai
  - Delias mysis (Fabricius, 1775)
  - Delias lara (Boisduval, 1836)
  - Delias periboea (Godart, 1819)
  - Delias poecilea (van Vollenhoven, 1865)
  - Delias rosenbergii (van Vollenhoven, 1865)
  - Delias salvini Butler, 1882
  - Delias sambawana Rothschild, 1894
  - Delias schoenbergi Rothschild, 1895
  - Delias timorensis (Boisduval, 1836)
- Incertae sedis
  - Delias africanus Kenrick, 1911
  - Delias akikoae Morita, 2001 Aru
  - Delias akrikensis Lachlan, 1999 New Guinea
  - Delias angabungana Talbot, 1928 New Guinea
  - Delias binniensis Lachlan, 2000 New Guinea
  - Delias brandti Müller, C, 2001 New Ireland
  - Delias chimbu Orr & Sibatani, 1986 New Guinea
  - Delias cumanau van Mastrigt, 2006 New Guinea
  - Delias durai van Mastrigt, 2006
  - Delias endela Jordan, 1930 New Guinea
  - Delias eschatia Joicey & Talbot, 1923 Buru
  - Delias felis Lachlan, 2000 New Guinea
  - Delias flavissima Orr & Sibatani, 1985 New Guinea
  - Delias fojaensis van Mastrigt, 2006 New Guinea
  - Delias hagenensis Morinaka, van Mastrigt & Sibatani, 1993
  - Delias hidecoae Nakano, 1993
  - Delias kazueae Kitahara, 1986 Sula Islands
  - Delias kikuoi Okano, 1989 Sulawesi
  - Delias konokono Orr & Sibatani, 1986 New Guinea
  - Delias kristianiae van Mastrigt, 2006
  - Delias laknekei Miller, L, Simon & Wills, 2007 New Ireland
  - Delias magsadana Yamamoto, 1995 Philippines
  - Delias mandaya Yamamoto & Takei, 1982
  - Delias mayrhoferi Bang-Haas, O, 1939 New Britain
  - Delias messalina Arora, 1983 New Ireland
  - Delias mullerensis Morinaka & Nakazawa, 1999 New Guinea
  - Delias ormoensis van Mastrigt, 2006 New Guinea
  - Delias paoaiensis Inomata & Nakano, 1987
  - Delias shirozui Yata, 1981 Sulawesi
  - Delias shunichii Morita, 1996 New Britain
  - Delias vidua Joicey & Talbot, 1922 Buru
  - Delias yagishitai Morita, 2003 Taliabu Island
