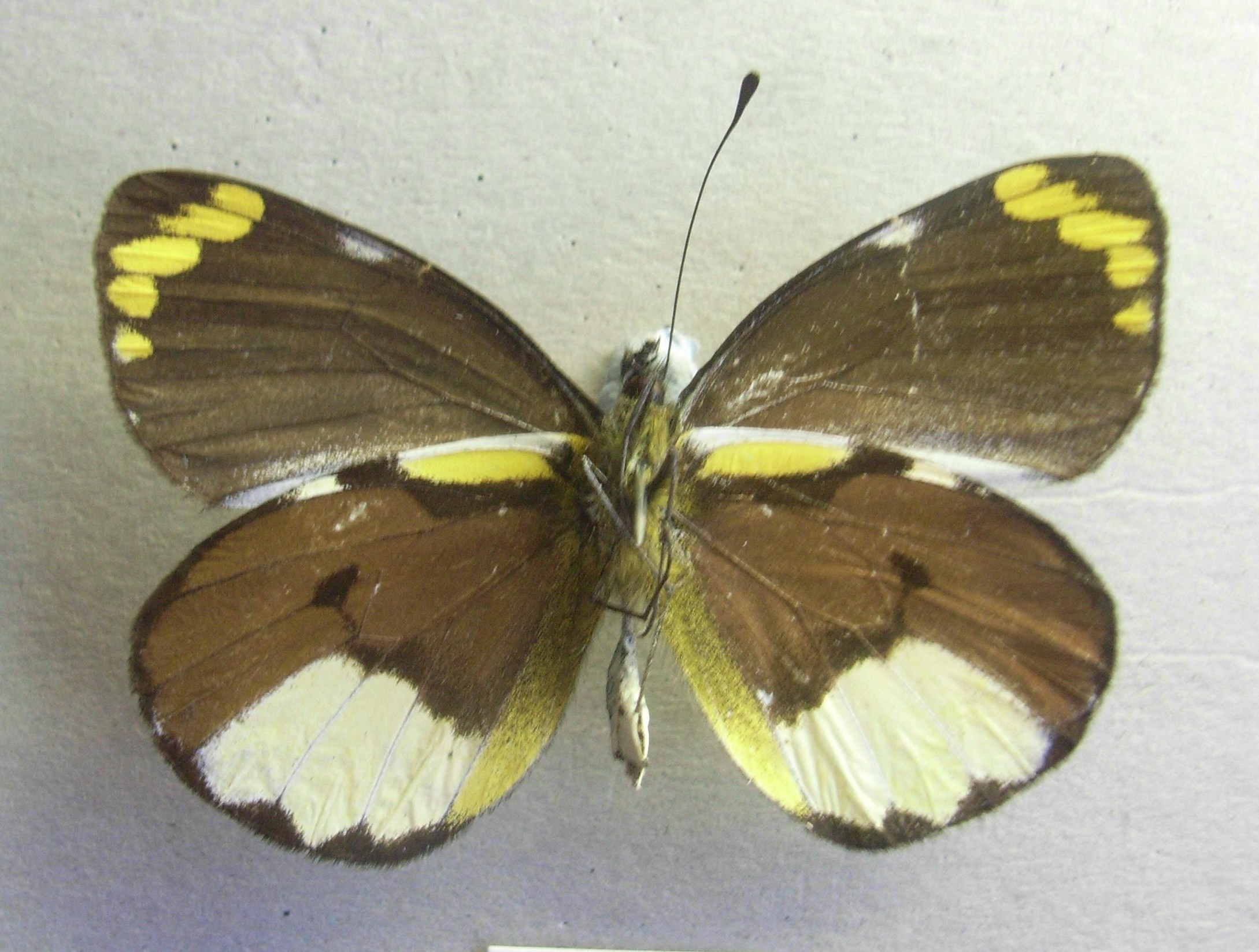
- Delias mira roepke

Scientific classification
- Domain: Eukaryota
- Kingdom: Animalia
- Phylum: Arthropoda
- Class: Insecta
- Order: Lepidoptera
- Family: Pieridae
- Genus: Delias
- Species: D. mira

Binomial name
- Delias mira Rothschild, 1904

Synonyms
- Delias mira reissingeri van Mastrigt, 1996; Delias mira mavrodii Tuzov & Churkin, 1998

= Delias mira =

Species of butterfly

Delias mira is a butterfly in the family Pieridae. It was described by Walter Rothschild in 1904. It is endemic to New Guinea.

The wingspan is about 60 mm.

== Subspecies ==
- D. m. mira (Owen Stanley Range, Papua New Guinea)
- D. m. cieko Arima, 1996 (Baliem, Pass Valley, Star Mountains)
- D. m. excelsa Jordan, 1930 (New Guinea, Herzog Mountains)
- D. m. flabella van Mastrigt, 1995 (Irian Jaya)
- D. m. reversa Rothschild, 1925 (New Guinea, Sattleburg, Rawlinson Mountains)
- D. m. roepkei Sanford & Bennett, 1955 (Central Highlands, Papua New Guinea)
