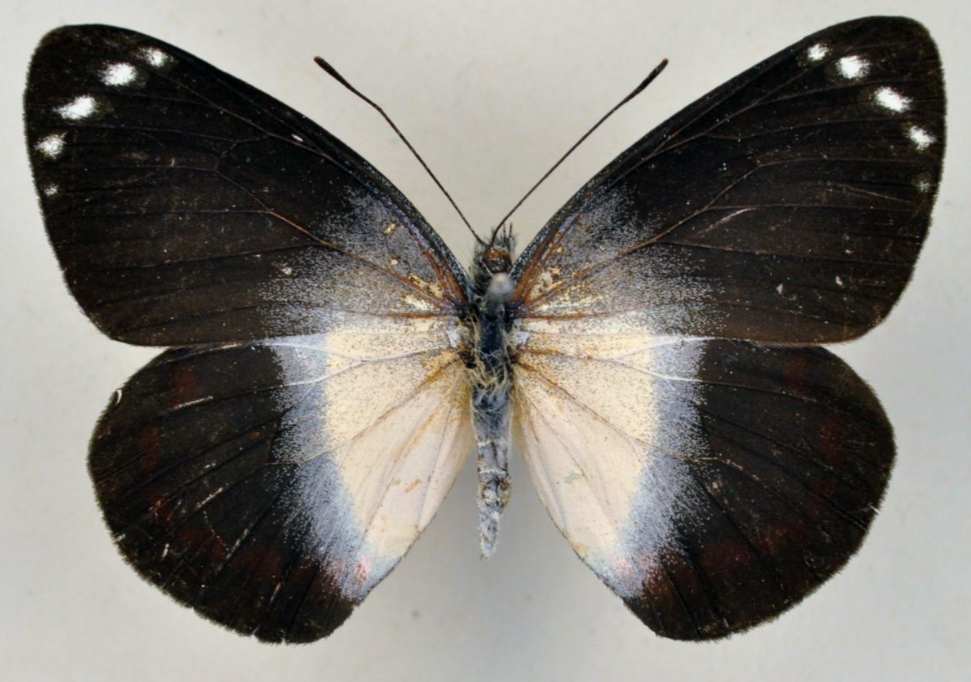

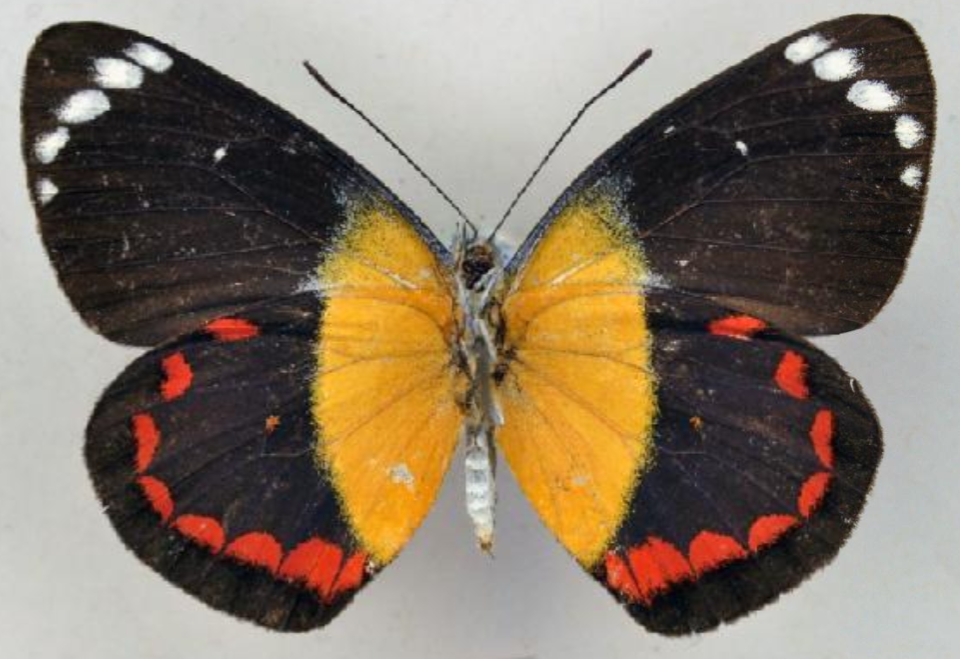
- ssp. romaensis

Scientific classification
- Kingdom: Animalia
- Phylum: Arthropoda
- Class: Insecta
- Order: Lepidoptera
- Family: Pieridae
- Genus: Delias
- Species: D. timorensis

Binomial name
- Delias timorensis (Boisduval, 1836)

Synonyms
- Pieris timorensis Boisduval, 1836; Pieris vishnu Moore, 1857; Delias timorensis moaensis f. lettinensis Röber, 1927

= Delias timorensis =

Species of butterfly

Delias timorensis is a butterfly in the family Pieridae. It was described by Jean Baptiste Boisduval in 1836. It is found in the Australasian realm (Timor).

== Description ==
D. timorensis is one of the most gaily coloured known species and is confined to the islands of the Timor Group, timorensis Bdv. (= vishnu Moore) (54 b, c), in my [Fruhstorfer] collection from Timor, Wetter, Babber and Kisser, gardineri males with whitish, females with gold-yellow colour at the base of the forewing beneath. — gardineri Fruhst. (54 c), from Timor Laut, with dark ochre-vellow colour at the base and much broader black distal margin on the under surface of both wings. The wingspan is about 60–70 mm for males and 64–71 mm for females.

== Subspecies ==
- D. t. timorensis (Timor)
- D. t. moaensis Rothschild, 1915 (Leti Island)
- D. t. babberica Talbot, 1939 (Babar Island)
- D. t. romaensis Rothschild, 1915(Romang Island)
- D. t. ardesiaca Rothschild, 1915 (Damar)
- D. t. gardineri Fruhstorfer, 1904 (Tanimbar Group)
- D. t. vishnu Moore, 1857 (Wetter Island)

== Taxonomy ==
timorensis is a member of the hyparete species group.
