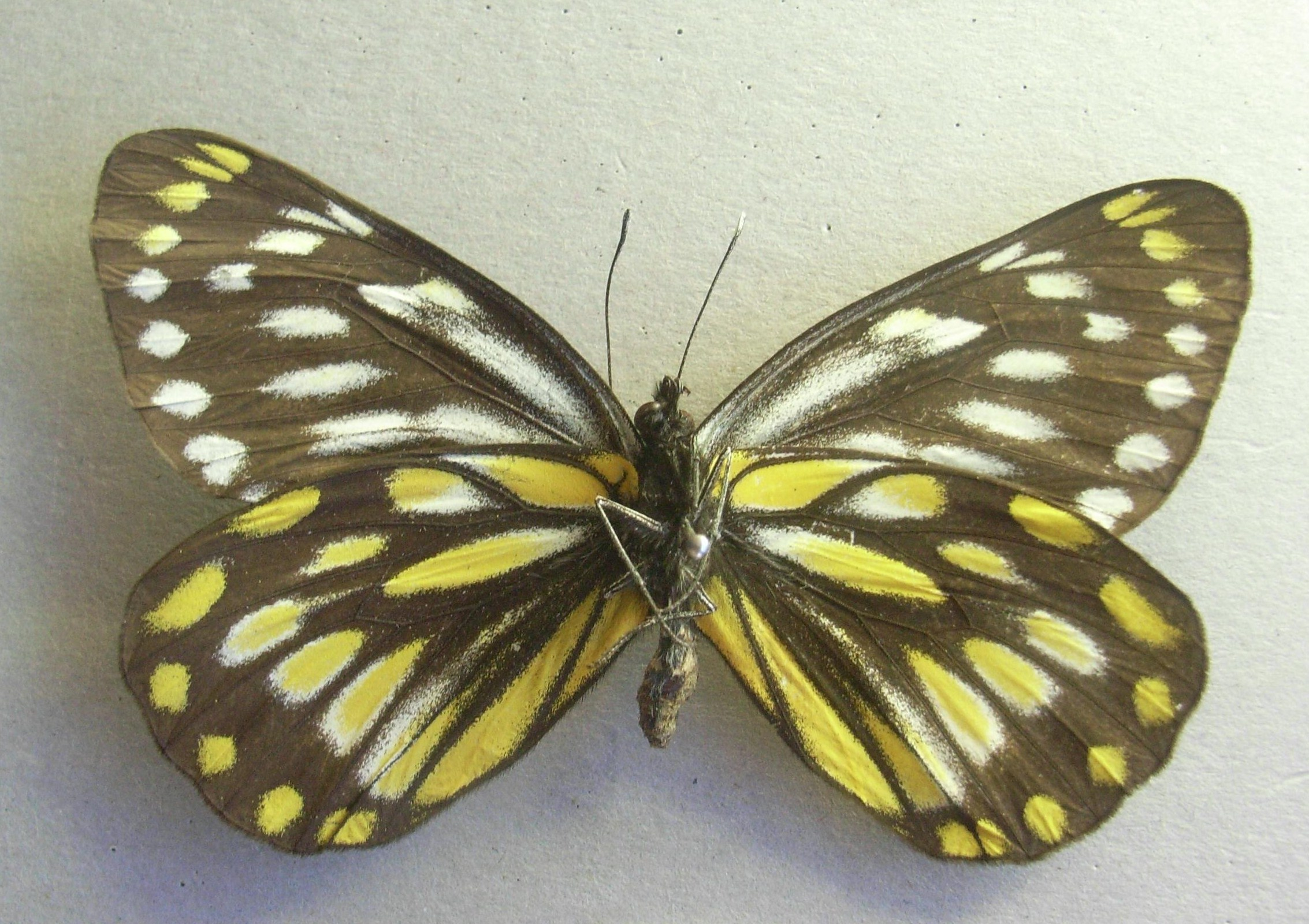
- Delias wilemani

Scientific classification
- Domain: Eukaryota
- Kingdom: Animalia
- Phylum: Arthropoda
- Class: Insecta
- Order: Lepidoptera
- Family: Pieridae
- Genus: Delias
- Species: D. wilemani

Binomial name
- Delias wilemani Jordan, 1925

= Delias wilemani =

Species of butterfly

Delias wilemani is a butterfly in the family Pieridae. It was described by Karl Jordan in 1925. It is endemic to Taiwan (Indomalayan realm).

The larvae feed on Loranthus species.
