= Delias dumasi =

Scientific classification
- Kingdom: Animalia
- Phylum: Arthropoda
- Class: Insecta
- Order: Lepidoptera
- Family: Pieridae
- Genus: Delias
- Species: D. dumasi

Binomial name
- Delias dumasi Rothschild, 1925

Species of butterfly

Delias dumasi is a butterfly in the family Pieridae. It was described by Rothschild in 1925 It is endemic to Buru. in the Moluccas.

== Description ==
Original Female "Above differs from Delias apatela and Delias rothschildi in the almost entirely brown-black fore wings, the basal 1/3 being only faintly freckled with paler scales, a little more thickly below vein 1. On the hind wing the colour is buffish-cream, not greyish white; the inner margin of the black outer two-fifths of the hind wing is deeply indented and crenulated, not straight. Below the fore wing differs in not having the first three of the five apical spots brightly yellow, not white, and in having a white quadrate spot between veins 8 and 9 at the end of the cell; the hind wing differs in the black marks in outer quarter being heavier and wider, and in being clear yellow with no orange or brownish suffusion, nervures white.

== Taxonomy ==
Delias dumasi is a member of the Delias nyse species group.
