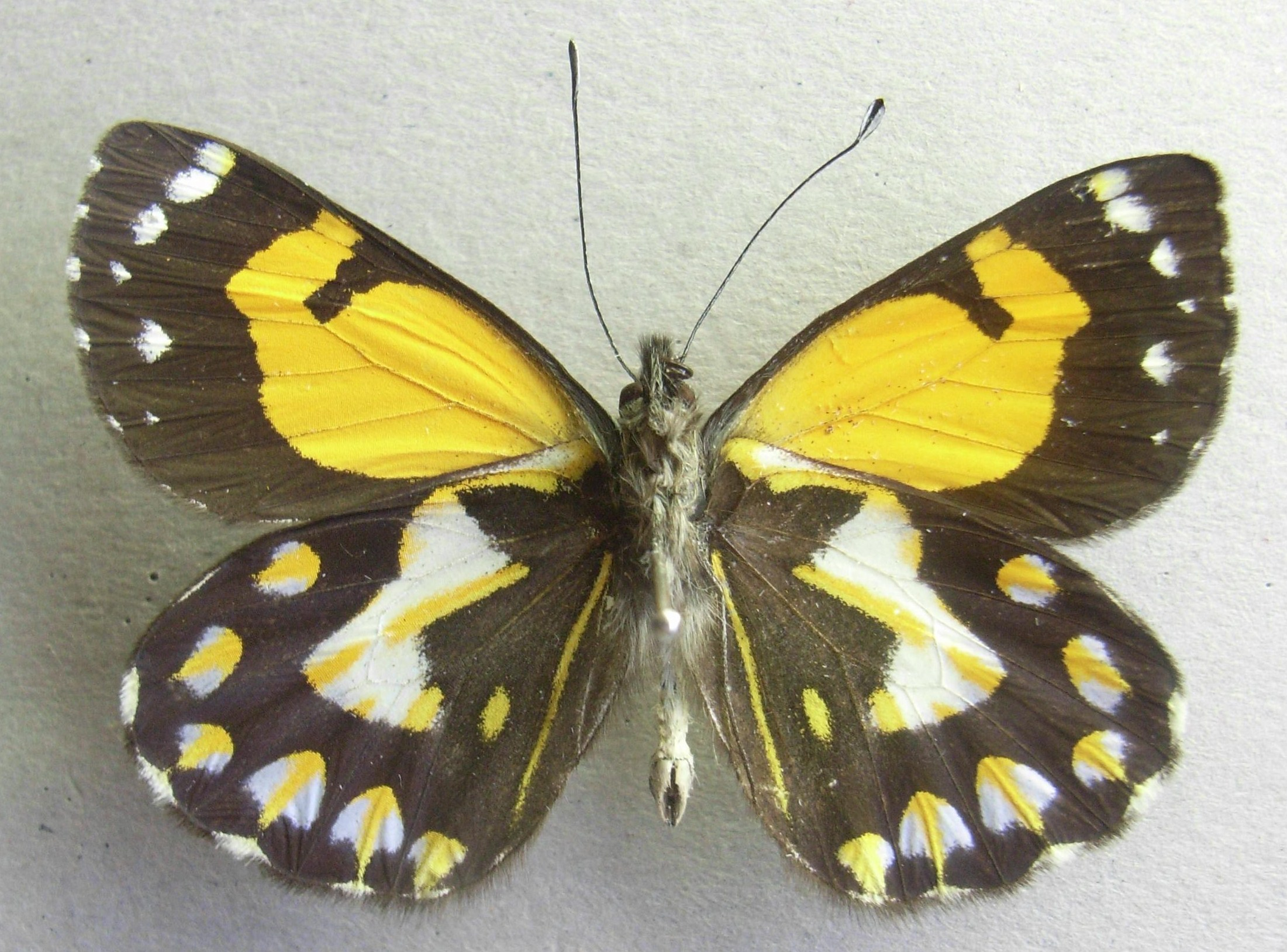

Scientific classification
- Kingdom: Animalia
- Phylum: Arthropoda
- Class: Insecta
- Order: Lepidoptera
- Family: Pieridae
- Genus: Delias
- Species: D. hallstromi

Binomial name
- Delias hallstromi Sanford & Bennett, 1955

= Delias hallstromi =

Species of butterfly

Delias hallstromi is a butterfly in the family Pieridae. It was described by Leonard J. Sanford and Neville Henry Bennett in 1955. It is endemic to Papua New Guinea, where it has been recorded from the Central Mountains, the Chimbu Province and Western Province.

== Taxonomy ==
hallstromi is a member of the Delias eichhorni species group.
