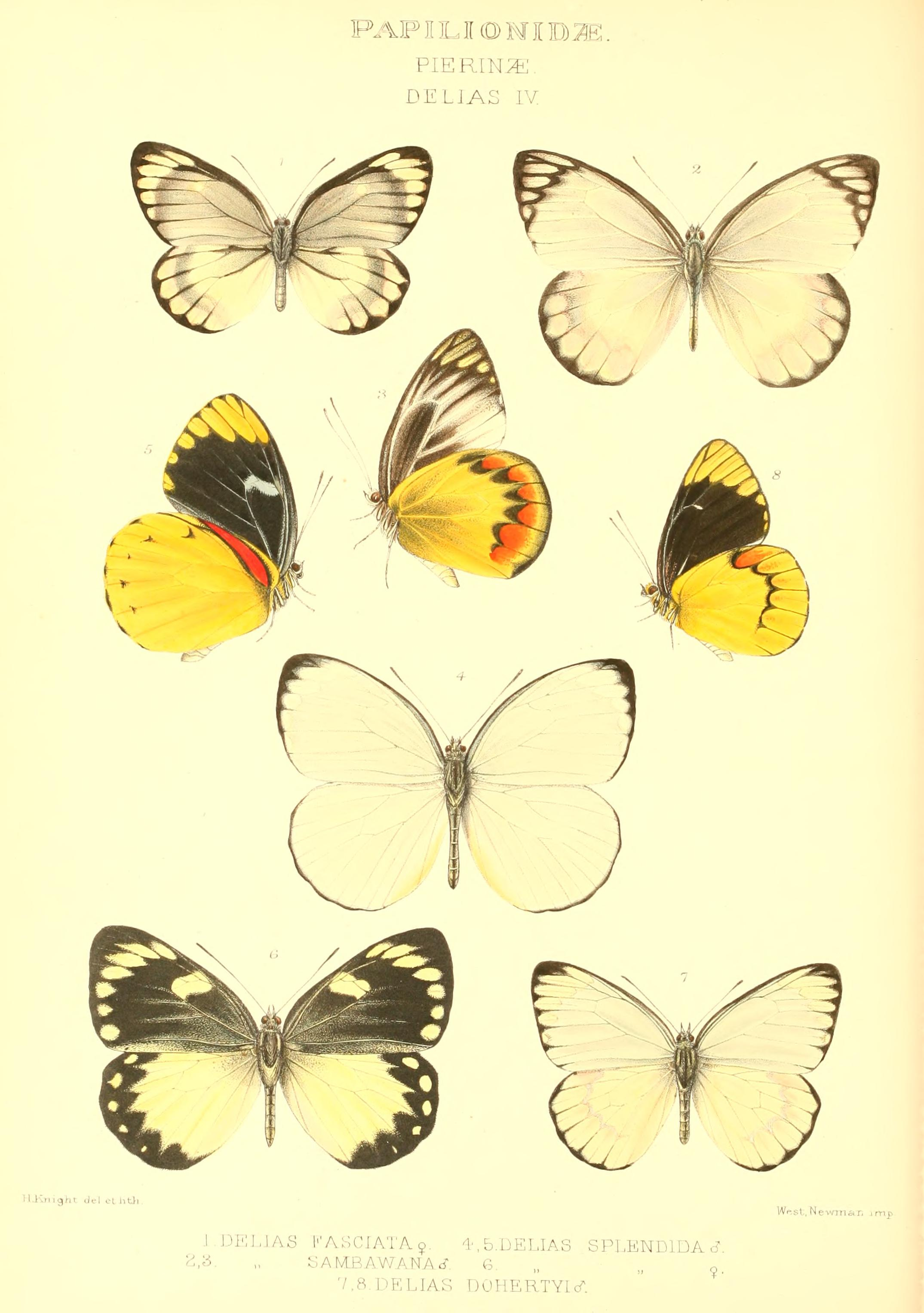

Scientific classification
- Domain: Eukaryota
- Kingdom: Animalia
- Phylum: Arthropoda
- Class: Insecta
- Order: Lepidoptera
- Family: Pieridae
- Genus: Delias
- Species: D. dohertyi

Binomial name
- Delias dohertyi Oberthür, 1894

= Delias dohertyi =

Species of butterfly

Delias dohertyi is a butterfly in the family Pieridae. It was described by Charles Oberthur in 1894. It is found in the Indomalayan realm.

The wingspan is about 55–60 mm.

== Subspecies ==
- Delias dohertyi dohertyi (Jobi)
- Delias dohertyi knowlei Joicey & Noakes, 1915 (Biak)

== Etymology ==
The name honours William Doherty.
