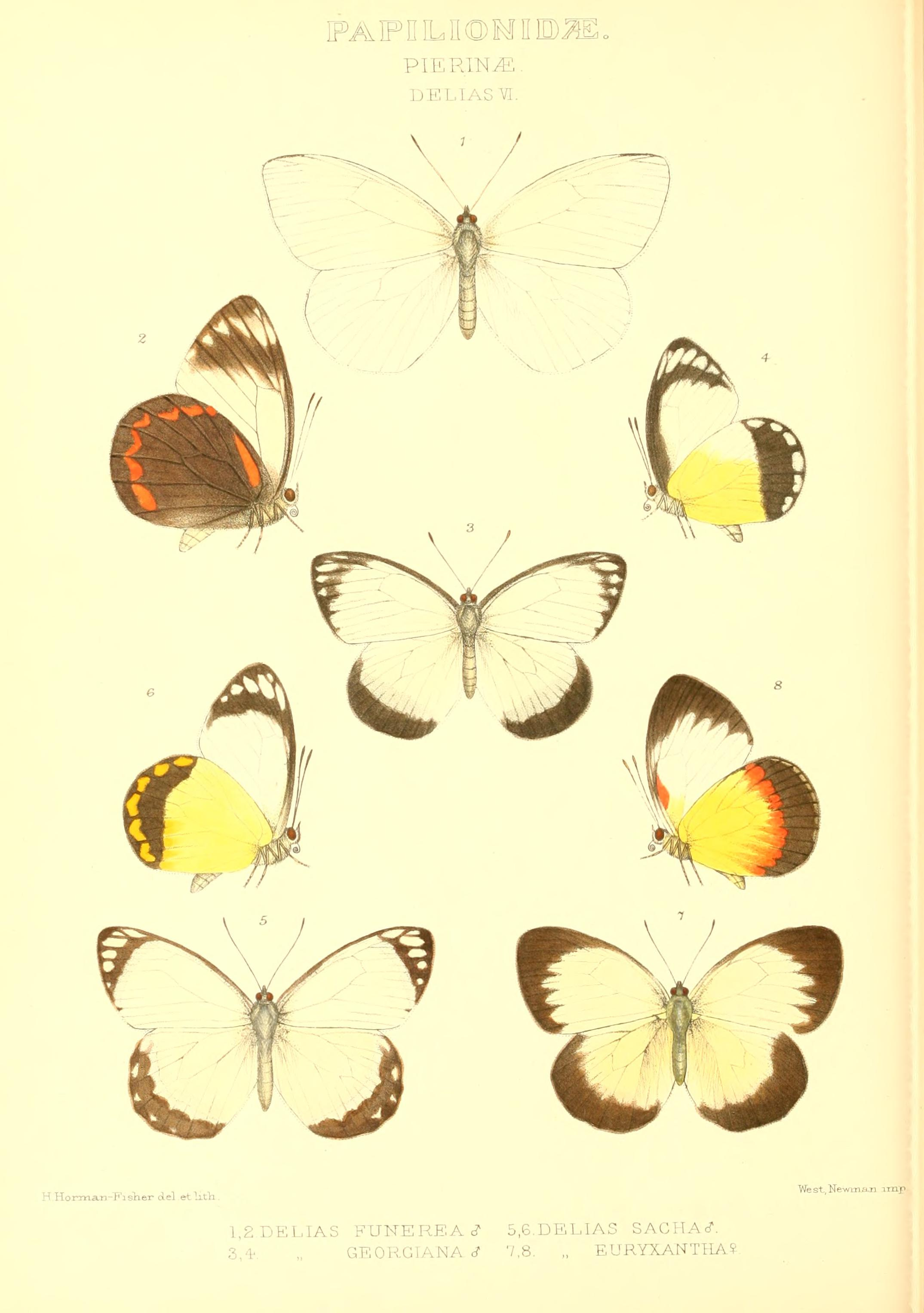
- In Henley Grose-Smith and William Forsell Kirby's Rhopalocera exotica

Scientific classification
- Domain: Eukaryota
- Kingdom: Animalia
- Phylum: Arthropoda
- Class: Insecta
- Order: Lepidoptera
- Family: Pieridae
- Genus: Delias
- Species: D. funerea

Binomial name
- Delias funerea Rothschild, 1894

Synonyms
- Delias plateni Staudinger, 1895

= Delias funerea =

Species of butterfly

Delias funerea is a butterfly in the family Pieridae. It was described by Walter Rothschild in 1894. It is found in the Australasian realm.

== Subspecies ==
- Delias funerea funerea (Halmahera)
- Delias funerea okko Nakano, 1986 (Bachan)
- Delias funerea moritai Yagishita, 1994 (Morotai)
