= Delias lemoulti =

Scientific classification
- Kingdom: Animalia
- Phylum: Arthropoda
- Class: Insecta
- Order: Lepidoptera
- Family: Pieridae
- Genus: Delias
- Species: D. lemoulti

Binomial name
- Delias lemoulti Talbot, 1931

Species of butterfly

Delias lemoulti is a butterfly in the family Pieridae. It was described by George Talbot in 1931 It is endemic to Timor. in the Australasian realm

== Taxonomy ==
Delias lemoulti is a member of the Delias nysa species group.

== Etymology ==
The name honours Eugène Le Moult
