= Delias anjae =

Scientific classification
- Domain: Eukaryota
- Kingdom: Animalia
- Phylum: Arthropoda
- Class: Insecta
- Order: Lepidoptera
- Family: Pieridae
- Genus: Delias
- Species: D. anjae

Binomial name
- Delias anjae Schroder, 1977

Synonyms
- Delias sagessa anjae Schroder, 1977

Species of butterfly

Delias anjae is a butterfly in the family Pieridae. It was described by Schroder in 1977. It is found in Arfak Mountains of Irian Jaya.

The wingspan is about 50 mm. Adults are similar to Delias sagessa.
