= Delias mullerensis =

Scientific classification
- Kingdom: Animalia
- Phylum: Arthropoda
- Class: Insecta
- Order: Lepidoptera
- Family: Pieridae
- Genus: Delias
- Species: D. mullerensis

Binomial name
- Delias mullerensis Morinaka & Nakazawa, 1999

Species of butterfly

Delias mullerensis is a butterfly in the family Pieridae. It was described by Sadaharu Morinaka and T. Nakazawa in 1999. It is found in the Muller Range in the Central Highlands of Papua New Guinea.

== Taxonomy ==
mullerensis is a member of the Delias eichhorni species group.
