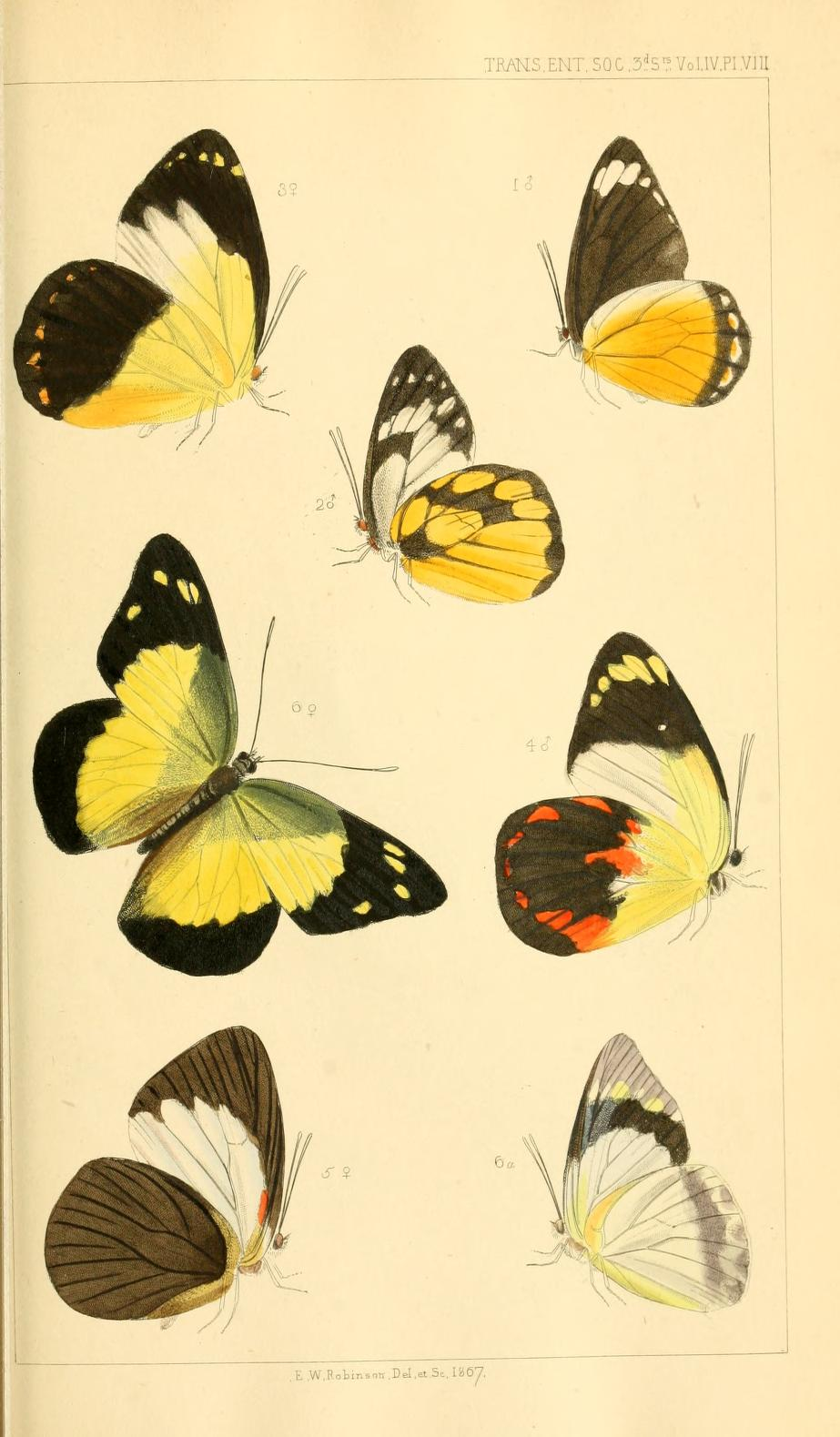
- Delias hippodamia in Wallace On the Pieridae of the Indian and Australian Regions

Scientific classification
- Kingdom: Animalia
- Phylum: Arthropoda
- Class: Insecta
- Order: Lepidoptera
- Family: Pieridae
- Genus: Delias
- Species: D. hippodamia

Binomial name
- Delias hippodamia (Wallace, 1867)

Synonyms
- Thyca hippodamia Wallace, 1867

= Delias hippodamia =

Species of butterfly

Delias hippodamia is a butterfly in the family Pieridae. It was described by Alfred Russel Wallace in 1867. It is endemic to Aru.

The wingspan is about 68 mm. Adults are very similar to Delias biaka. It has still broader black distal margins than the very similar Delias gabia.

== Taxonomy ==
hippodamia is a member of the nysa species group.
