= Delias schoenigi =

Scientific classification
- Domain: Eukaryota
- Kingdom: Animalia
- Phylum: Arthropoda
- Class: Insecta
- Order: Lepidoptera
- Family: Pieridae
- Genus: Delias
- Species: D. schoenigi

Binomial name
- Delias schoenigi Schröder, 1975

Species of butterfly

Delias schoenigi is a species of pierine butterfly endemic Mindanao in the Philippines.

The wingspan is 55–62 mm.

== Subspecies ==
- Delias schoenigi schoenigi (Mt. Apo, south-central Mindanao)
- Delias schoenigi hermeli Samusawa & Kawamura, 1988 (Mt. Kitanlad, central Mindanao)
- Delias schoenigi malindangeana Nakano & Yagishita, 1993 (Mt. Malindang, western Mindanao)
- Delias schoenigi pasiana Nakano & Yagishita, 1993 (Mt. Pasian, eastern Mindanao)
- Delias schoenigi samusawai Yagishita & Morita, 1996 (Mt. Matutum, southern Mindanao)
