= Delias schuppi =

Scientific classification
- Kingdom: Animalia
- Phylum: Arthropoda
- Class: Insecta
- Order: Lepidoptera
- Family: Pieridae
- Genus: Delias
- Species: D. schuppi

Binomial name
- Delias schuppi Talbot, 1928

Species of butterfly

Delias schuppi is a butterfly in the family Pieridae. It was described by George Talbot in 1928. It is endemic to Serang in the Indomalayan realm.

== Taxonomy ==
Delias schuppi is a member of the Delias nyse species group.
