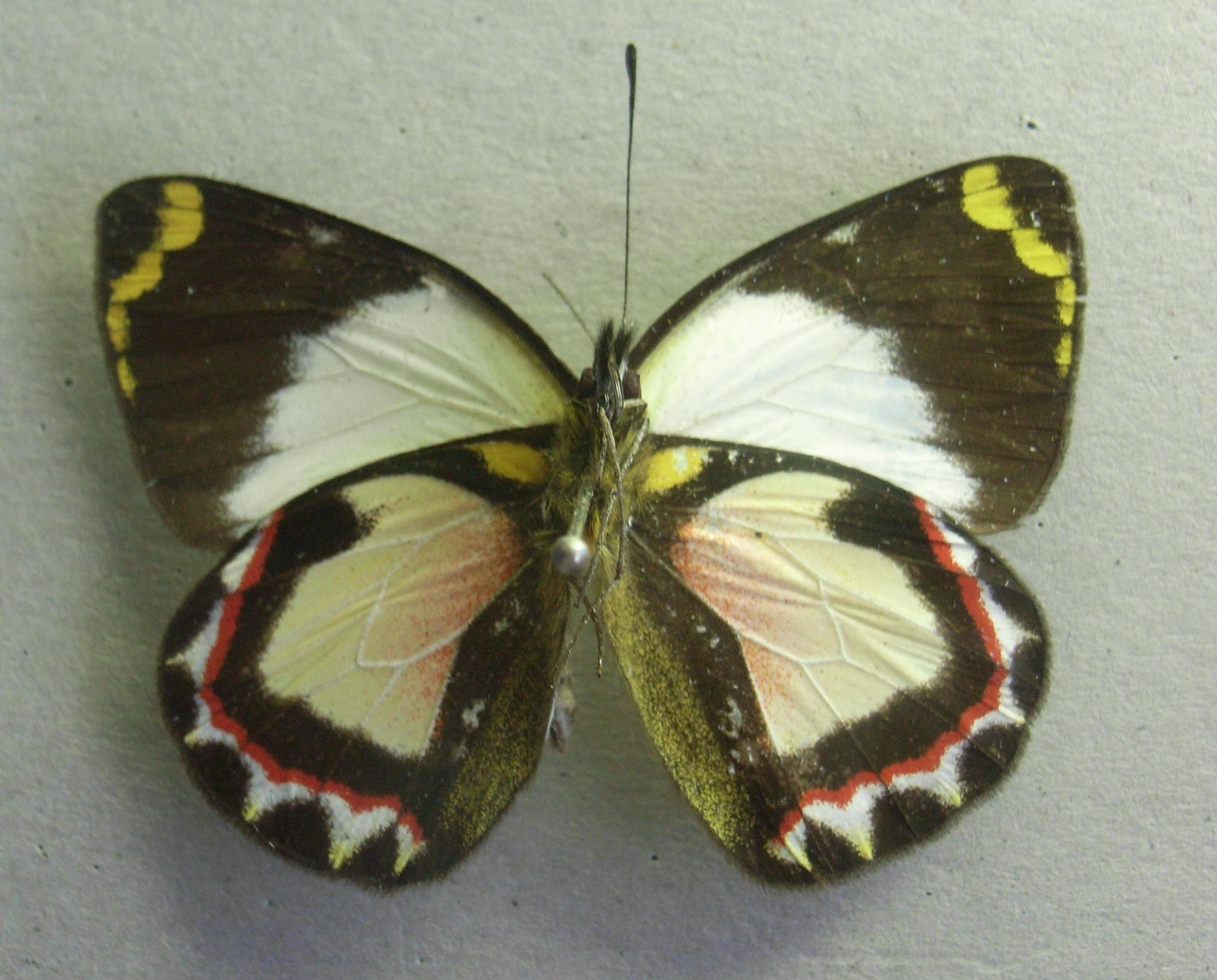

Scientific classification
- Kingdom: Animalia
- Phylum: Arthropoda
- Class: Insecta
- Order: Lepidoptera
- Family: Pieridae
- Genus: Delias
- Species: D. mesoblema

Binomial name
- Delias mesoblema Jordan, 1912

= Delias mesoblema =

Species of butterfly

Delias mesoblema is a butterfly in the family Pieridae. It was described by Karl Jordan in 1912. It is found in the Indomalayan realm, where it has only been recorded from Mount Goliath in Irian Jaya.

The wingspan is about 44–48 mm. The forewings of the males have a white area, which is usually extended well beyond the end of the cell. Its outer edge is well defined and formed as in Delias iltis, but without any angle. The costa is black to the base and there are one or two subapical dots. The hindwings are white with a black fringe. In females, the white area is reduced and sometimes tinged with yellow. The hindwings have a black marginal border of nearly even width. This border may sometimes bear a row of five white spots, the two anterior ones more distinct than the others.

== Taxonomy ==
mesoblema is a member of the iltis species group.
