= Delias ribbei =

Scientific classification
- Kingdom: Animalia
- Phylum: Arthropoda
- Class: Insecta
- Order: Lepidoptera
- Family: Pieridae
- Genus: Delias
- Species: D. ribbei

Binomial name
- Delias ribbei Röber, 1886

Species of butterfly

Delias ribbei is a butterfly in the family Pieridae. It was described by Julius Rober in 1886. It is endemic to Aru in the Indomalayan realm.

== Description ==
D. ribbei Rob., from the Aru Islands, is a very rare species, of which sacha Gr.-Sm. is perhaps a local form. The white subapical spots on the underside of the forewing in ribbei are broader than in echo, the black submarginal band of the hindwing is narrowed, whilst the submarginal spots are strongly enlarged and assume a quadrate form.

== Taxonomy ==
Delias ribbei is a member of the Delias nyse species group. The name honours Carl Ribbe.
