= Delias frater =

Scientific classification
- Kingdom: Animalia
- Phylum: Arthropoda
- Class: Insecta
- Order: Lepidoptera
- Family: Pieridae
- Genus: Delias
- Species: D. frater

Binomial name
- Delias frater Jordan, 1911

Synonyms
- Delias eichhorni frater Jordan, 1911

Species of butterfly

Delias frater is a butterfly in the family Pieridae. It was described by Karl Jordan in 1911. It is found in New Guinea.

The wingspan is about 56 mm. it is part of the Delias eichhorni species group.

== Subspecies ==
- D. f. frater (Mount Goliath, Langda, Irian Jaya; Western Province, Papua New Guinea)
- D. f. soror Toxopeus, 1944 (Korupun, Irian Jaya)
- D. f. far Schroder & Treadaway, 1982 (Paniaia, Irian Jaya)
