= Delias muliensis =

Scientific classification
- Kingdom: Animalia
- Phylum: Arthropoda
- Class: Insecta
- Order: Lepidoptera
- Family: Pieridae
- Genus: Delias
- Species: D. muliensis

Binomial name
- Delias muliensis Morinaka, Mastrigt & Sibatani, 1991

Synonyms
- Delias germana muliensis Morinaka, Mastrigt & Sibatani, 1991

Species of butterfly

Delias muliensis is a butterfly in the family Pieridae. It was described by Sadaharu Morinaka, Henricus Jacobus Gerardus van Mastrigt and Atuhiro Sibatani in 1991. It is found in the Central Mountains of Irian Jaya.

== Taxonomy ==
muliensis is a member of the Delias eichhorni species group.
