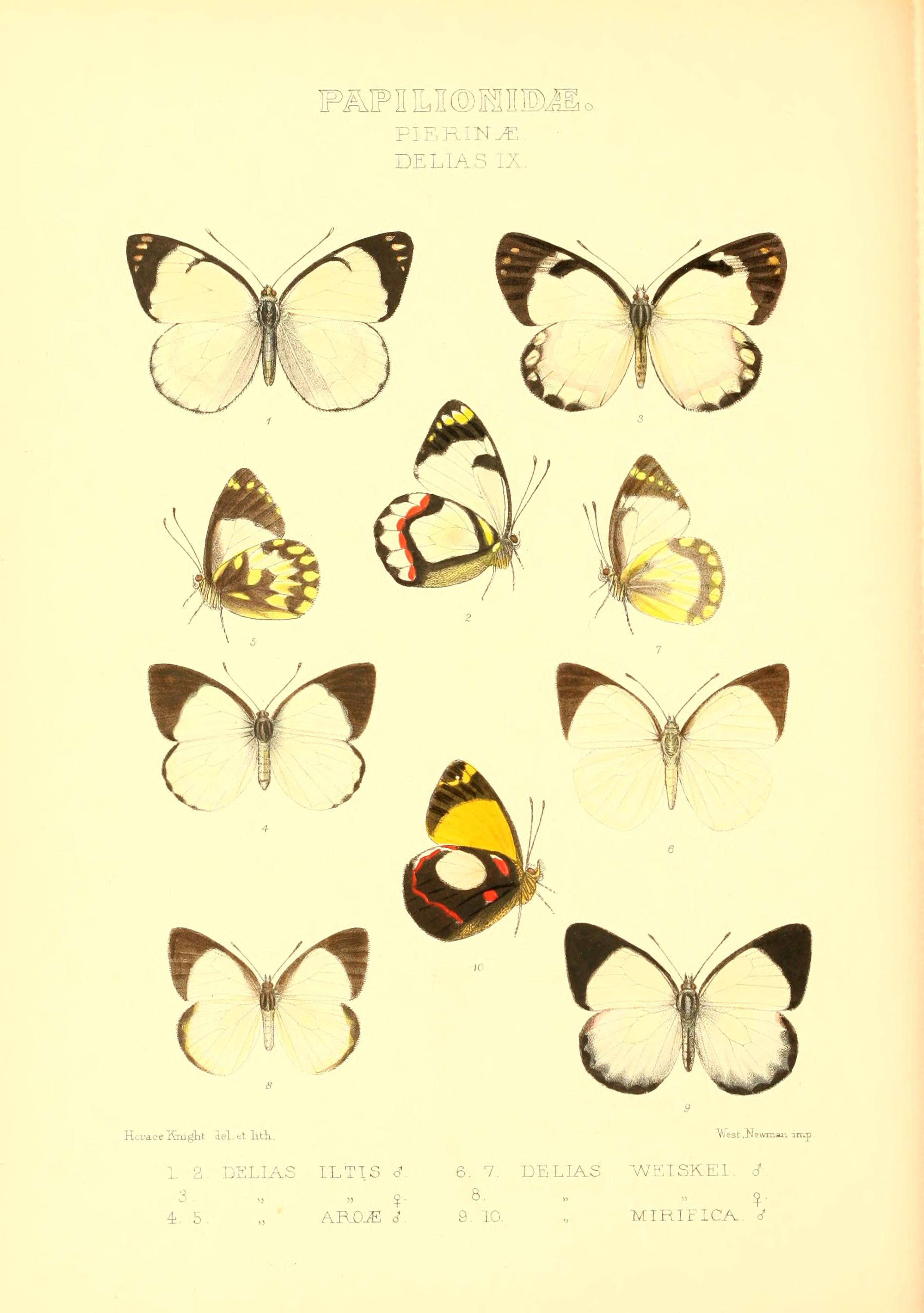
- Delias aroae in Grose-Smith and Kirby Rhopalocera Exotica

Scientific classification
- Kingdom: Animalia
- Phylum: Arthropoda
- Clade: Pancrustacea
- Class: Insecta
- Order: Lepidoptera
- Family: Pieridae
- Genus: Delias
- Species: D. aroae

Binomial name
- Delias aroae (Ribbe, 1900)

Synonyms
- Pieris aroae Ribbe, 1900; Delias aroa balimenis Roepke, 1955

= Delias aroae =

Species of butterfly

Delias aroae is a butterfly in the family Pieridae. It was described by Carl Ribbe in 1900. It is found in New Guinea (Aroa River).

== Description ==
The wingspan is about 38 mm. The male forewing above pure white with a black, oblique, very broad apical spot The distal margin of the otherwise pure white hindwing is adorned with a narrow black band, which is somewhat narrowed from the costa to the anal angle. The under surface as in geraldina Gr.-Sm. and cuningputi, but with white median and basal regions on the forewing and a strongly divided black basal part to the hindwing, on which are placed 2 larger yellow patches. The subterminal spots of the hindwing are pure yellow, isolated, much larger than in cuningputi. The under surface of the female bears 3 median and 4 submarginal patches, which are much smaller and more orange-yellow than in the male.

== Subspecies ==
- Delias aroae aroae (Central Highlands, West Papua to Papua New Guinea)
- Delias aroae yabensis Joicey & Talbot, 1922 (Weyland Mounts, Baliem Valley)
