= Delias caeneus =

Scientific classification
- Kingdom: Animalia
- Phylum: Arthropoda
- Clade: Pancrustacea
- Class: Insecta
- Order: Lepidoptera
- Family: Pieridae
- Genus: Delias
- Species: D. caeneus

Binomial name
- Delias caeneus (Linnaeus, 1758)

Synonyms
- Papilio ceneus Linnaeus, 1758; Papilio caeneus Linnaeus, 1767; Papilio discors Gmelin, 1790; Papilio plexaris Donovan, 1805; Cathaemia anthyparete Hübner, [1819]; Pieris philyra Godart, 1819; Thyca philotis Wallace, 1867

Species of butterfly

Delias caeneus is a butterfly in the family Pieridae. It was described by Carl Linnaeus in 1758. It is found in the Australasian realm.

== Description ==
caeneus is very like other species in the hyparete group. Except that the hindwing red markings are more developed. Diagnostic is the red patch at the end of the cell on the hindwing verso. There are two races. In the female caeneus the grey basal dusting of the forewing reaches the costal margin, whilst in philotis Wall. (53 d, e), from Buru, it only extends a little beyond the base of the cell and only below the median is widened in the shape of distinct white stripes. The base of philotis is beneath lighter and purer yellow, on the other hand the red spot in the cell of the hindwing is much reduced and the black submarginal region is extended.

The wingspan is about 70–76 mm.

== Subspecies ==
- D. c. ceneus (Ambon, Serang, Moluccas)
- D. c. philotis (Wallace, 1867) (Buru)

== Taxonomy ==
ceneus is a member of the hyparete species group.
