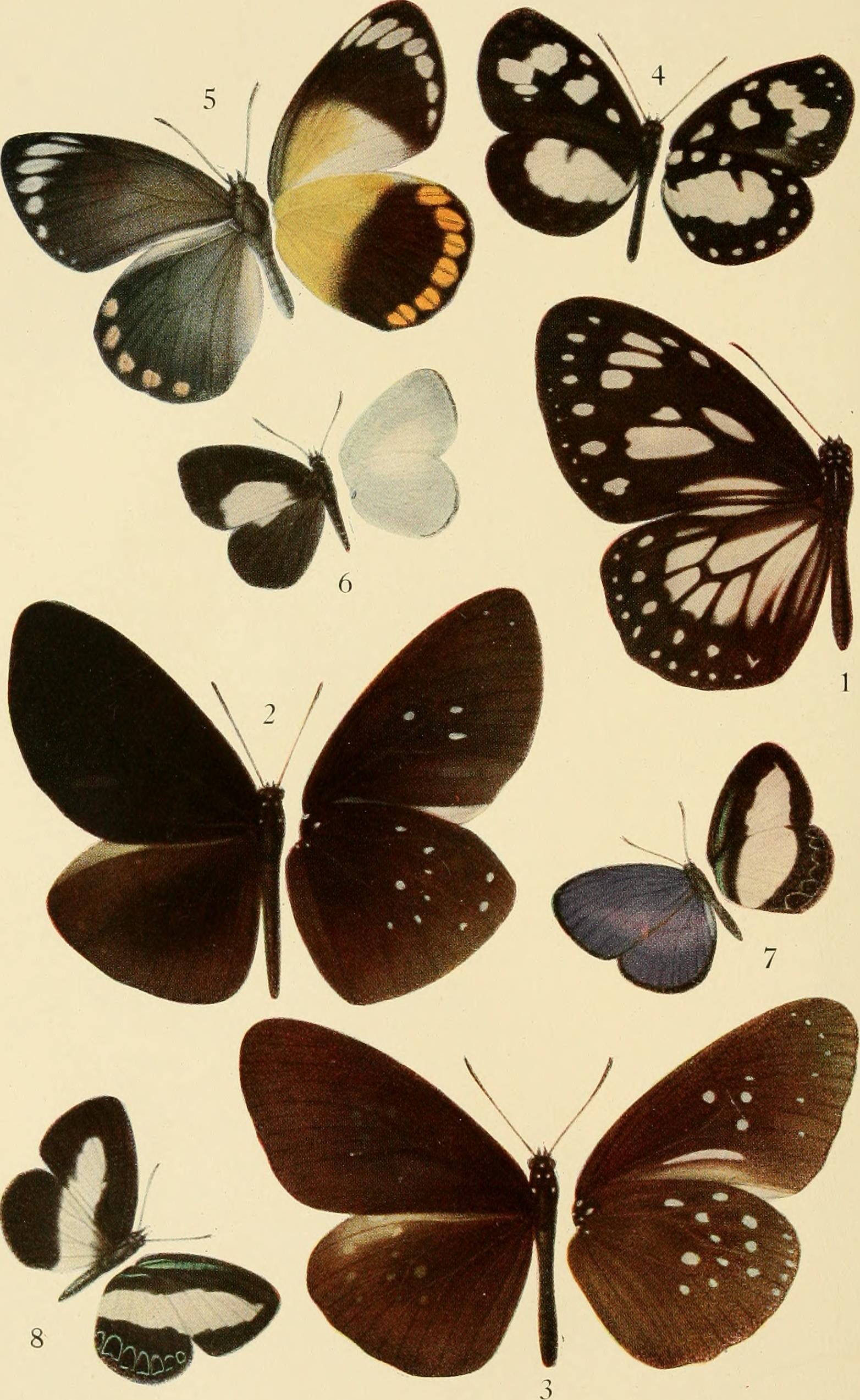
- Delias bosnikiana female (figure 5)

Scientific classification
- Kingdom: Animalia
- Phylum: Arthropoda
- Class: Insecta
- Order: Lepidoptera
- Family: Pieridae
- Genus: Delias
- Species: D. bosnikiana

Binomial name
- Delias bosnikiana Joicey & Noakes, 1915

= Delias bosnikiana =

Species of butterfly

Delias bosnikiana is a butterfly in the family Pieridae. It was described by James John Joicey and Alfred Noakes in 1915. It is endemic to Biak in the Australasian realm.

== Description ==
original

Delias bosnikiana, sp. nov. (Plate XXIV, fig. 1.) This species bears a superficial resemblance to the preceding one,[ Delias ennia multicolor Joicey & Noakes, 1915] but we think it belongs to the poecilia group.

Male. The forewing is more produced at the apex than in multicolor. It differs above in the much narrower black margin which only reaches just below vein 4, and in the consequent absence of apical spots. The hindwing bears some black scaling around the ends of veins 2,3, and 4. The underside differs from multicolor in the increased costal and apical black, and the larger apical spots all of which are white. The inner-marginal orange area is more strongly defined and extended basally. The marginal black is broader and the spots smaller, those in 5 and 6 being absent.

Female: Upperside black, basal half sparsely powdered with white. Forewing with three large white apical spots prolonged basad, a faint white subcostal streak, a rounded spot in 3, a small spot in 2, and a dot in le. Hindwing with costa white. A submarginal row of pinkish-white spots in 2-6, somewhat heart-shaped, their apices directed to the margin.

Underside of forewing with basal half white, tinged with lemonyellow in cell and outside its lower edge. Costa black to base.Apical and submarginal spots large and better defined. Hindwing with outer half black, including apex of cell; basal half greenish-yellow, its outer edge tinged with orange at abdominal margin and a patch of orange on costa. Submarginal spots as above, bright orange, larger and more rounded than on upperside, a double spot in Ic.

Length of forewing: male 30 mm., female 26.5 mm.

A small series of both sexes. A figure of the female will be given in a succeeding paper.We may here note that five of the seven Delias now known from Biak have females with dark upperside and prominent submarginal spots.

== Taxonomy ==
Bosnikianais a member of the Delias isse species group.
