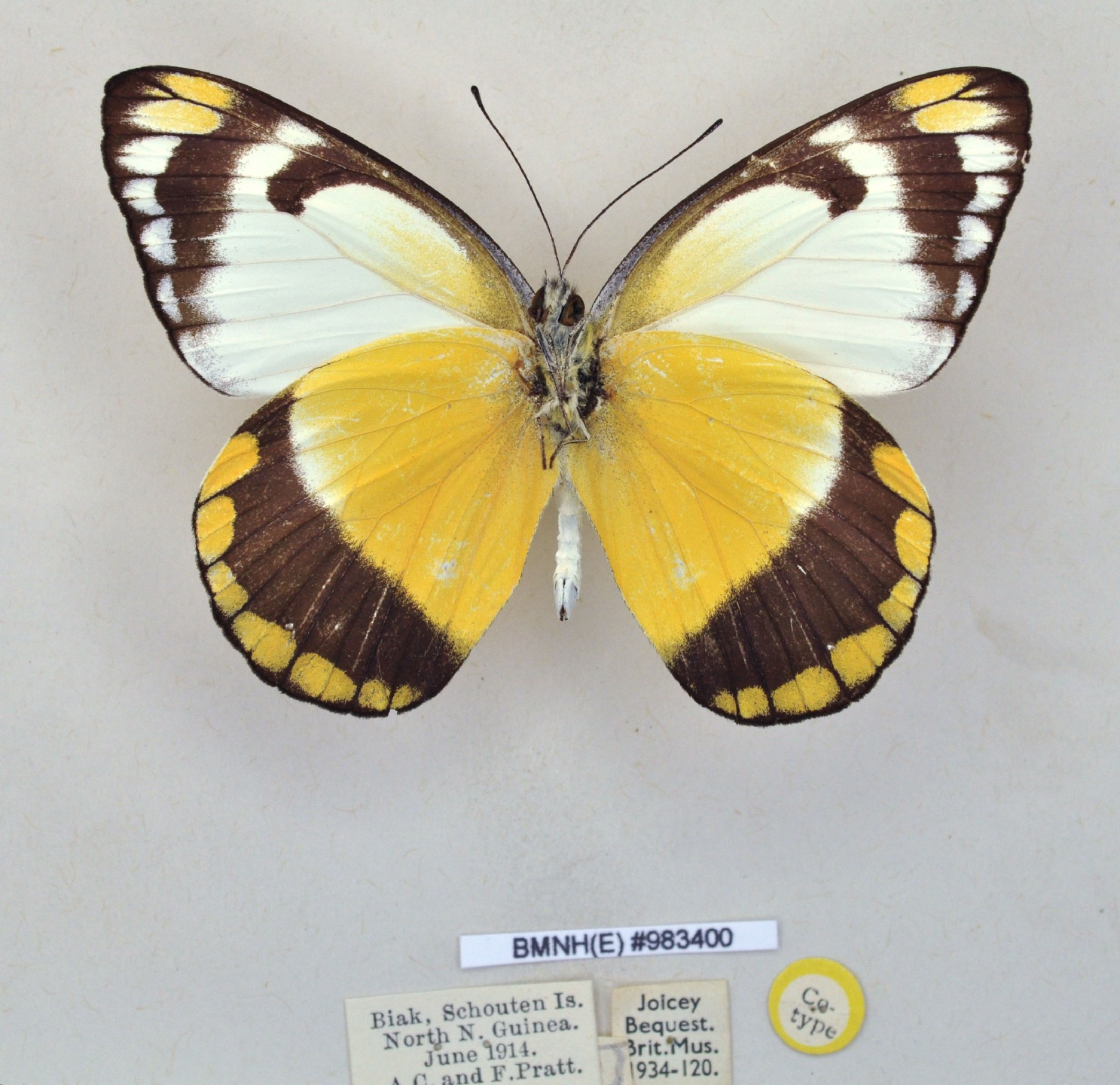
- Delias maudei J.& N. male verso

Scientific classification
- Kingdom: Animalia
- Phylum: Arthropoda
- Class: Insecta
- Order: Lepidoptera
- Family: Pieridae
- Genus: Delias
- Species: D. maudei

Binomial name
- Delias maudei Joicey & Akfred Noakes, 1915

= Delias maudei =

Species of butterfly

Delias maudei is a butterfly in the family Pieridae. It was described by James John Joicey & Alfred Noakes in 1915 . It is endemic to Biak in the Australasian realm.
