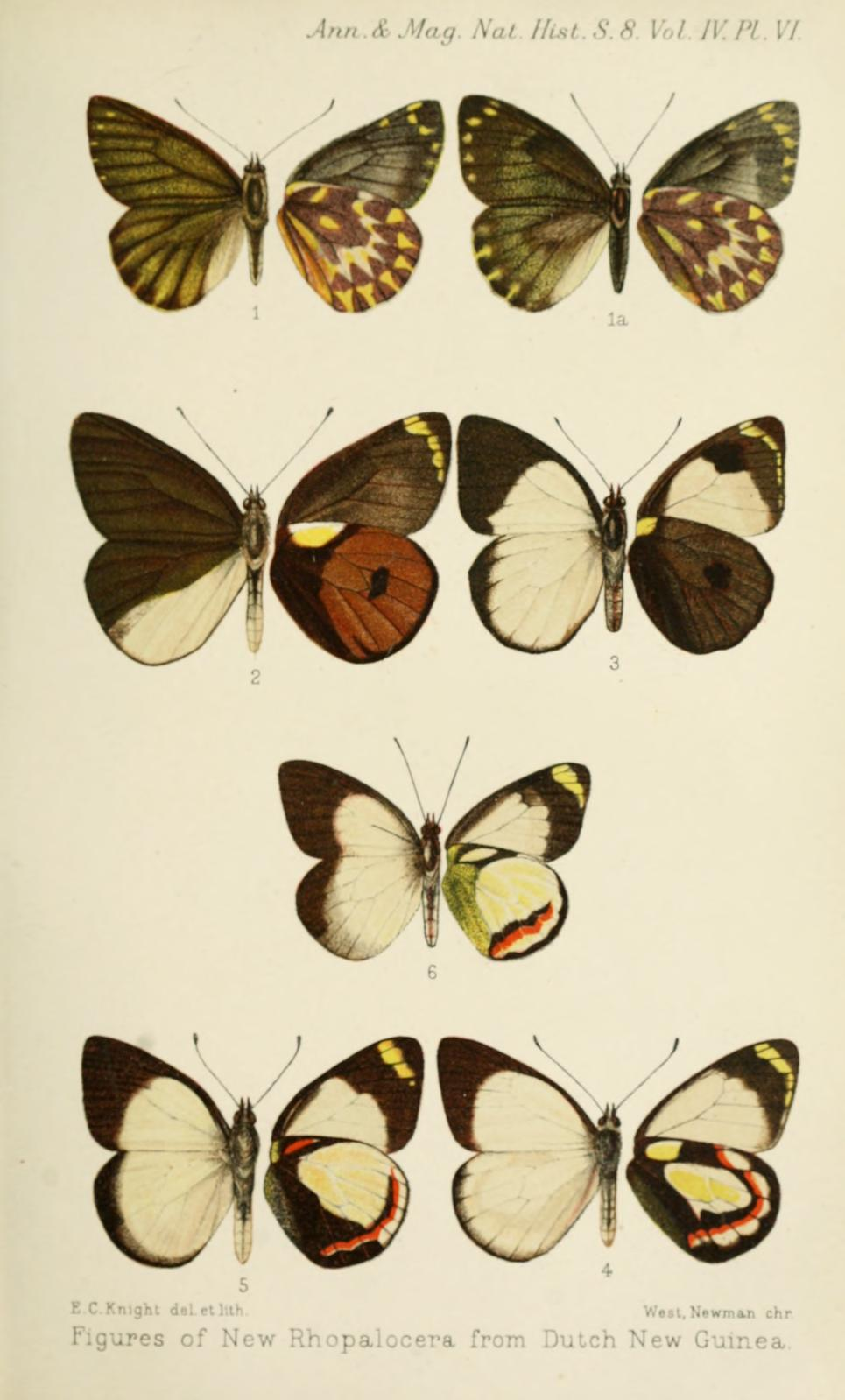
- Delias bothwelli in Kenrick, 1909 Descriptions of Delias from New Guinea

Scientific classification
- Domain: Eukaryota
- Kingdom: Animalia
- Phylum: Arthropoda
- Class: Insecta
- Order: Lepidoptera
- Family: Pieridae
- Genus: Delias
- Species: D. bothwelli

Binomial name
- Delias bothwelli Kenrick, 1909

= Delias bothwelli =

Species of butterfly

Delias bothwelli is a butterfly in the family Pieridae. It was described by George Hamilton Kenrick in 1909. It is found in the Arfak Mountains of New Guinea.
