= Delias waterstradti =

Scientific classification
- Kingdom: Animalia
- Phylum: Arthropoda
- Class: Insecta
- Order: Lepidoptera
- Family: Pieridae
- Genus: Delias
- Species: D. waterstradti

Binomial name
- Delias waterstradti Rothschild, 1915

Species of butterfly

Delias waterstradti is a butterfly in the family Pieridae. It was described by Walter Rothschild in 1915.It is endemic to Halmahera in the Indomalayan realm.

== Description ==
Delias waterstradti, sp. n. Male Above canary-yellow tinged with green; apex and costal area of fore wing and margin of hind wing brown. Below, fore wing black-brown, cell densely and rest of basal 1/2 of wing sparsely powdered with golden yellow; beyond cell and along nervures the yellow powdering is more densely present, almost appearing like a band of yellow patches ; a subapical band of large golden-yellow patches. Hind wing, basal 3/5 golden yellow, powdered in basal 1/2 with sooty black; outer 3/5 black-brown, with submarginal row of large golden-yellow patches.

== Taxonomy ==
Delias waterstradti is a member of the Delias nyse species group.
