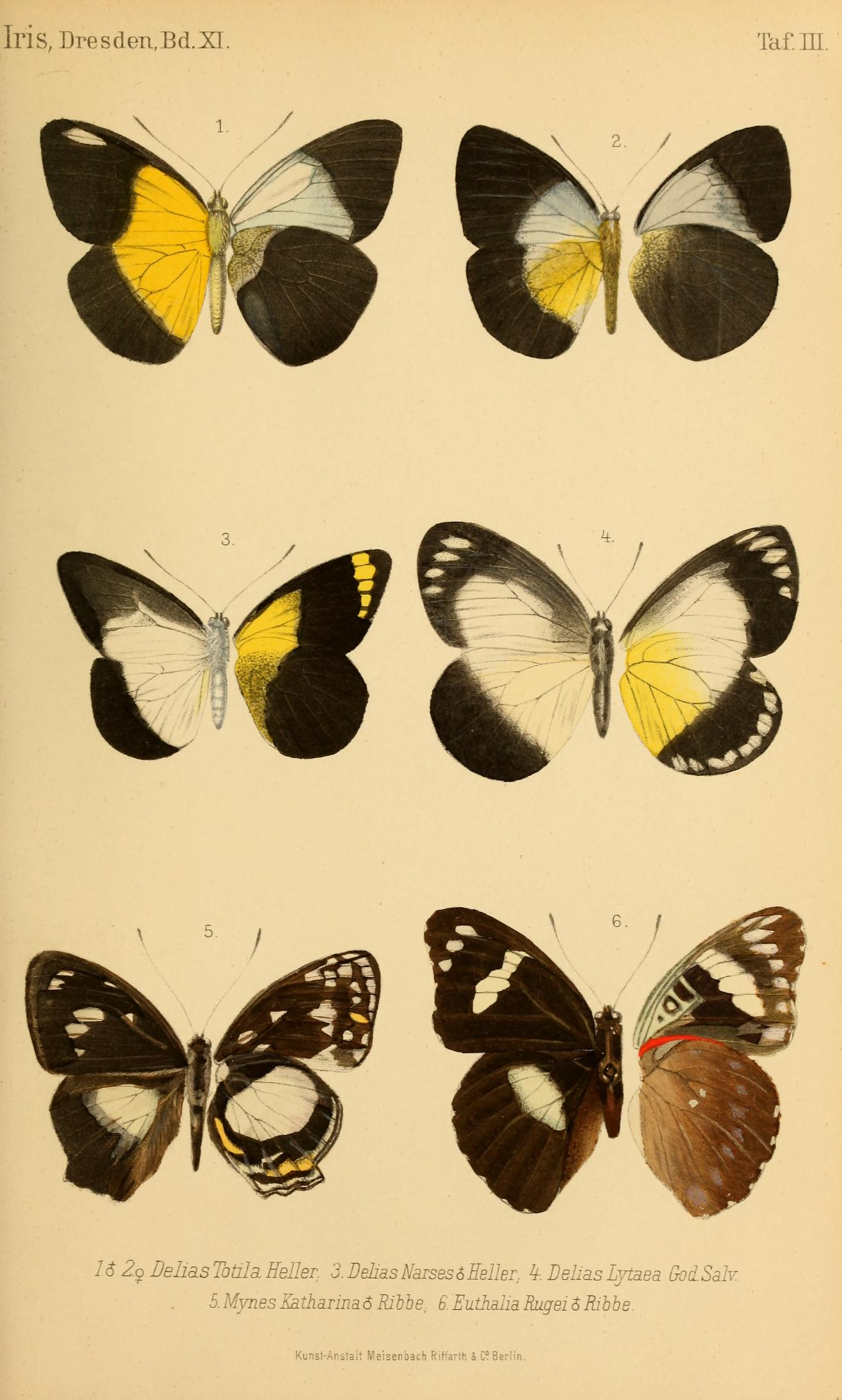
- Delias narses in Deutsche Entomologische Zeitschrift

Scientific classification
- Kingdom: Animalia
- Phylum: Arthropoda
- Class: Insecta
- Order: Lepidoptera
- Family: Pieridae
- Genus: Delias
- Species: D. narses

Binomial name
- Delias narses Heller, 1896

= Delias narses =

Species of butterfly

Delias narses is a butterfly in the family Pieridae. It was described by Karl Borromaeus Maria Josef Heller in 1896. It is endemic to New Britain and New Ireland.

== Description ==
D. narses Heller has also the base of the forewing beneath yellow and the whole distal half of the wings is sharply differentiated, deep black and with 5 almost equal yellow roundish patches. New Pomerania (= New Britain).

== Taxonomy ==
narses is a member of the dorimene species group.
