= Delias hypomelas =

- In Seitz

Scientific classification
- Kingdom: Animalia
- Phylum: Arthropoda
- Clade: Pancrustacea
- Class: Insecta
- Order: Lepidoptera
- Family: Pieridae
- Genus: Delias
- Species: D. hypomelas

Binomial name
- Delias hypomelas Rothschild & Jordan, 1907

Synonyms
- Delias itamputi hypomelas Rothschild & Jordan, 1907

Species of butterfly

Delias hypomelas is a butterfly in the family Pieridae. It was described by Walter Rothschild and Karl Jordan in 1907. It is endemic to New Guinea. It has a white form named "argentata"

The wingspan is about 60–64 mm.

== Subspecies ==
- D. h. hypomelas (Central Highlands, Papua New Guinea)
- D. h. conversa Jordan, [1912] (Mount Goliath, Irian Jaya; Western Province, Papua New Guinea)
- D. h. rubrostriata Joicey & Talbot, 1922 (Weyland Mountains, Irian Jaya)
- D. h. rawlinsoni Talbot, 1928 (Rawlinson Mountains, Papua New Guinea)
- D. h. fulgida Roepke, 1955 (south of Idenburg: central-northern Irian Jaya)
- D. h. lieftincki Roepke, 1955 (Ibele Valley, Wamena, Irian Jaya)
