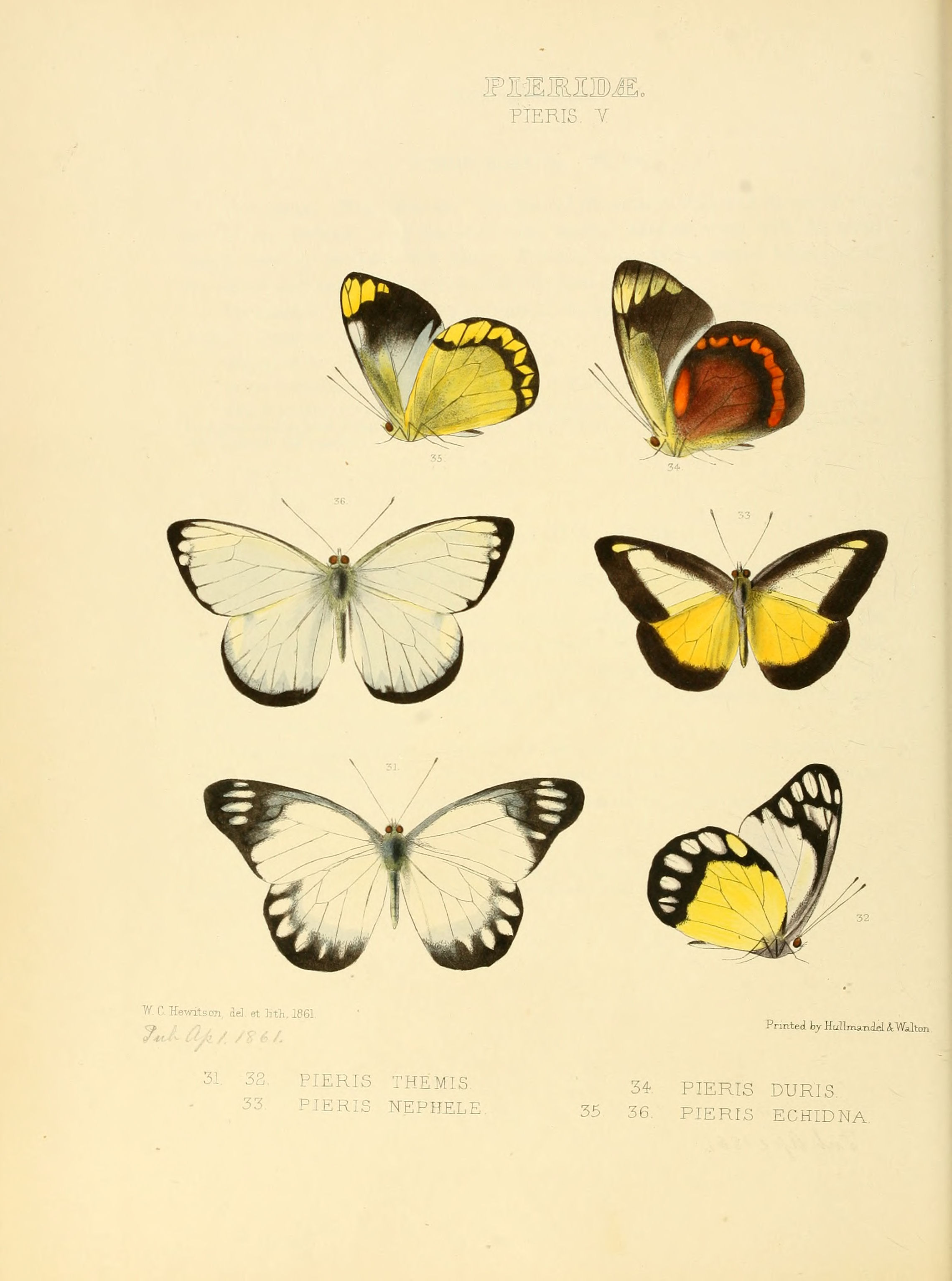
- Delias themis in Hewitson Illustrations of new species of exotic butterflies

Scientific classification
- Kingdom: Animalia
- Phylum: Arthropoda
- Class: Insecta
- Order: Lepidoptera
- Family: Pieridae
- Genus: Delias
- Species: D. themis

Binomial name
- Delias themis (Hewitson, 1861)

Synonyms
- Pieris themis Hewitson, 1861

= Delias themis =

Species of butterfly

Delias themis is a butterfly in the family Pieridae. It was described by William Chapman Hewitson in 1861. It is found in the Indomalayan realm.

D. themis Hew. has the deep black distal margin more sharply expressed but essentially narrower than in soteira subsp. nov. (55 d), from Luzon, which is also distinguishable beneath by much narrower white circumcellular spots on the forewing.

== Subspecies ==
- D. t. themis (Mindanao, Panaon, Letye, Camiguin & Bohol Islands)
- D. t. soteira Fruhstorfer, 1910 (Luzon, Marinduque & Polillo Islands)
- D. t. mihoae Nakano, 1993 (Negros)
- D. t. yuii Nakano, 1993 (Panay)
- D. t. kawamurai Nakano, 1993 (Mindoro)
