= Delias anamesa =

Scientific classification
- Kingdom: Animalia
- Phylum: Arthropoda
- Class: Insecta
- Order: Lepidoptera
- Family: Pieridae
- Genus: Delias
- Species: D. anamesa

Binomial name
- Delias anamesa Bennett, 1956

Species of butterfly

Delias anamesa is a butterfly in the family Pieridae. It was described by Neville Henry Bennett in 1956. It is endemic to the Chimbu Province of Papua New Guinea.

The wingspan is about 68–80 mm.

== Taxonomy ==
This species is often considered to be a subspecies of Delias niepelti, but was given specific status during a full review of the niepelti group.

== Gallery ==
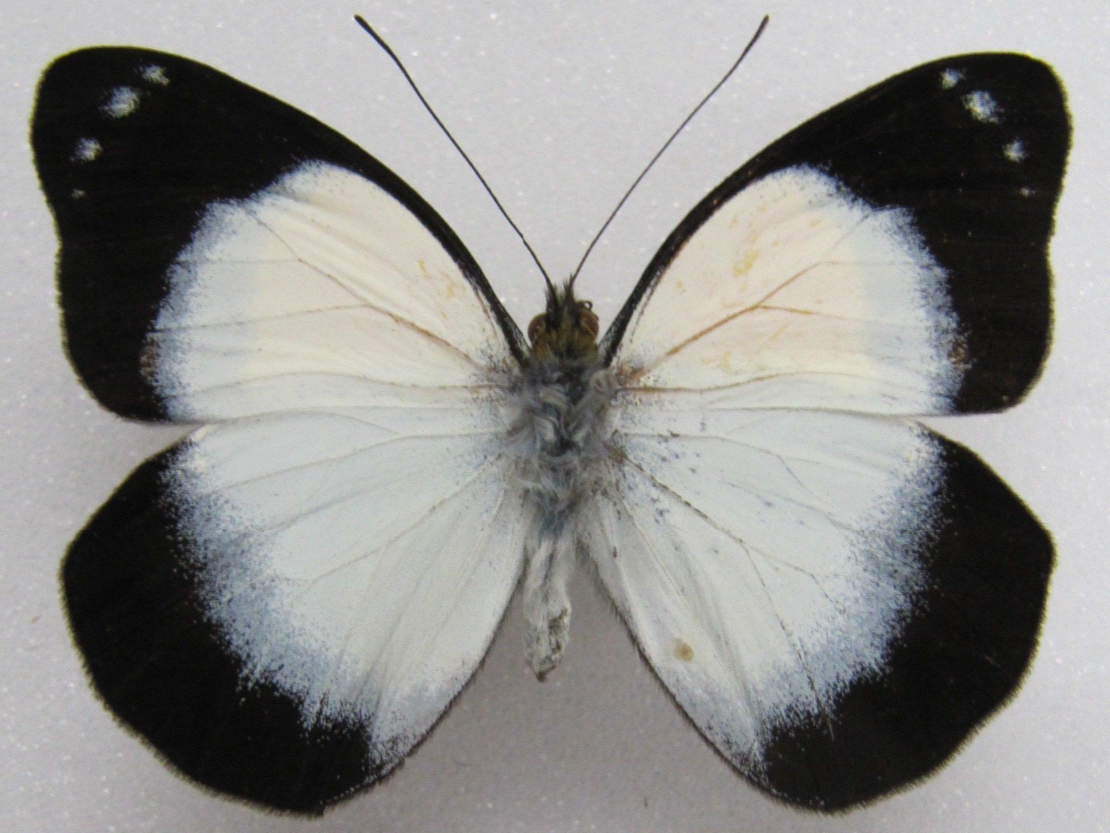
Male upperside

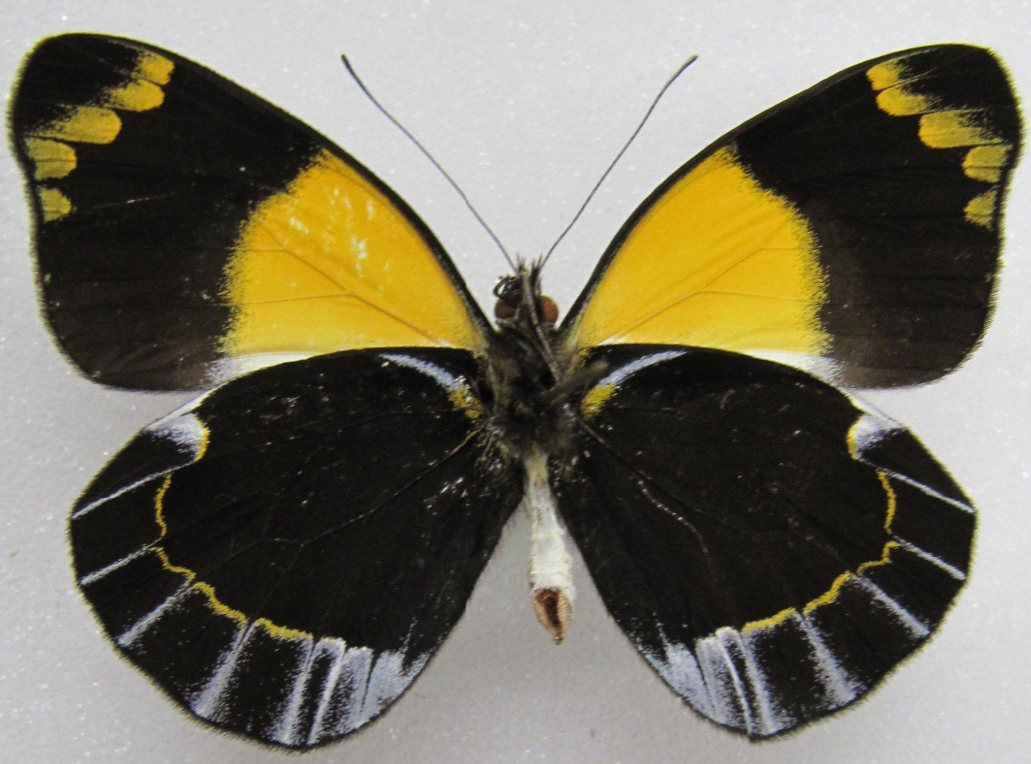
Male underside

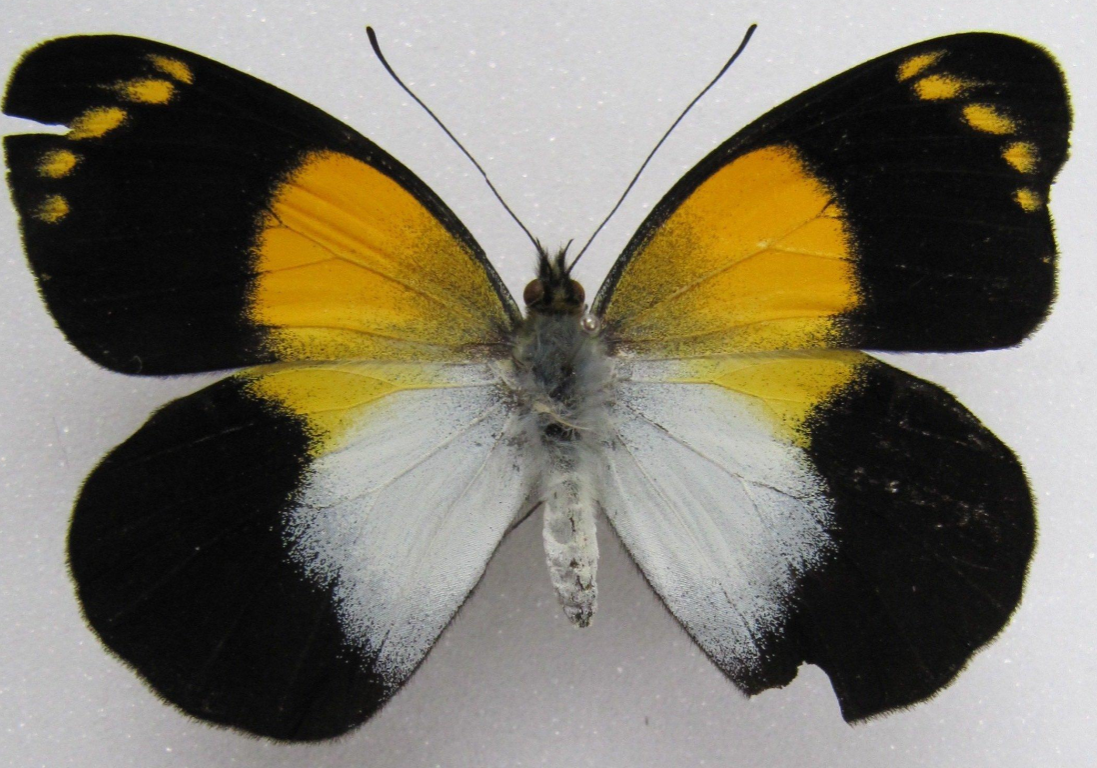
Female upperside

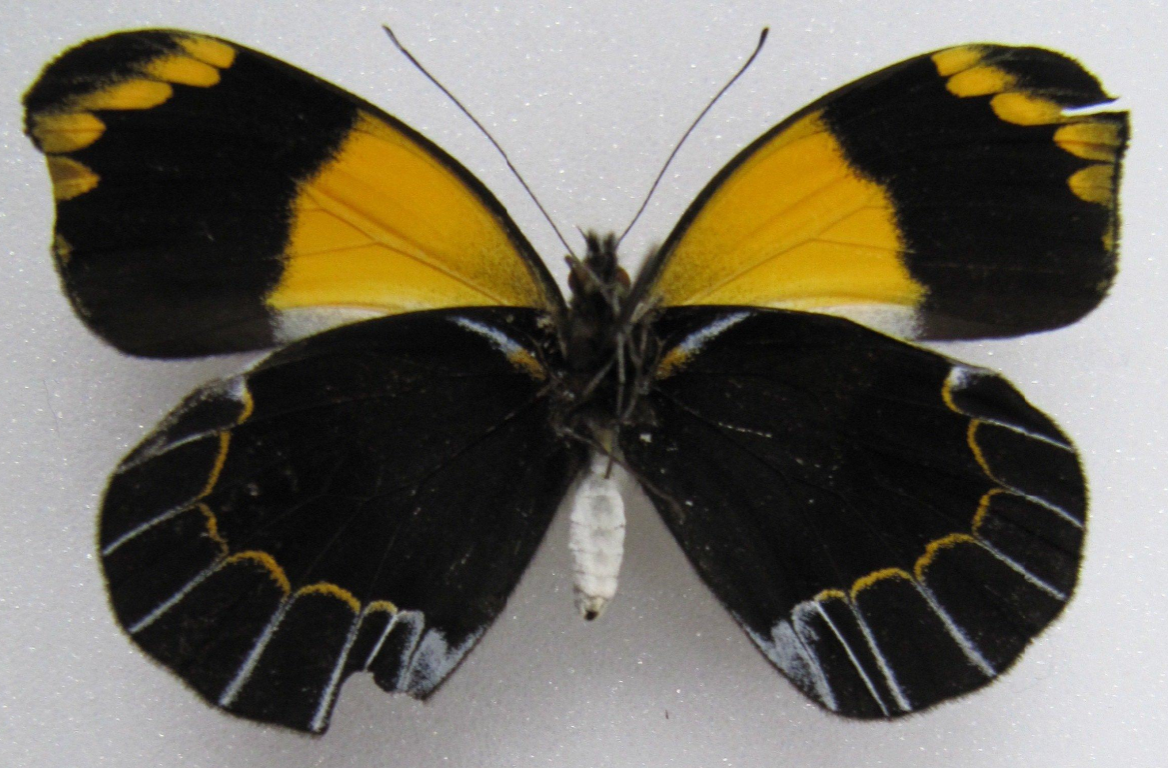
Female underside
