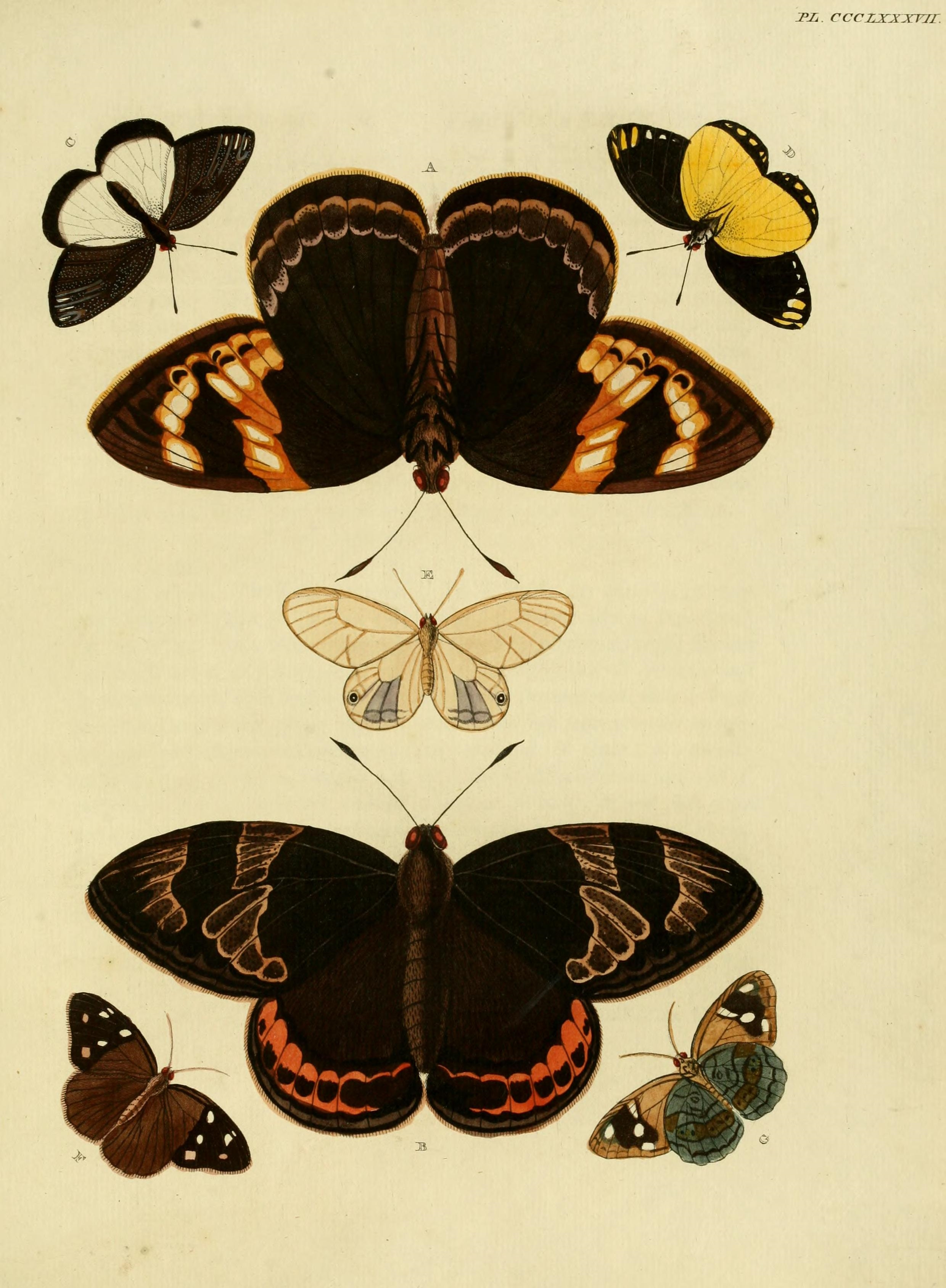
- In Cramer and Stoll's Uitlandsche Kapellen

Scientific classification
- Domain: Eukaryota
- Kingdom: Animalia
- Phylum: Arthropoda
- Class: Insecta
- Order: Lepidoptera
- Family: Pieridae
- Genus: Delias
- Species: D. dorimene

Binomial name
- Delias dorimene (Stoll, [1782])

Synonyms
- Papilio dorimene Stoll, [1782]; Papilio fuliginosus Gmelin, 1788; Pieris ageleis Godart, 1819

= Delias dorimene =

Species of butterfly

Delias dorimene is a butterfly in the family Pieridae. It was described by Caspar Stoll in 1782. It is found in the Australasian realm.

== Subspecies ==
- Delias dorimene dorimene (Ambon)
- Delias dorimene avenda Fruhstorfer, 1912 (Ceram)
