= Delias ninus =

Scientific classification
- Kingdom: Animalia
- Phylum: Arthropoda
- Clade: Pancrustacea
- Class: Insecta
- Order: Lepidoptera
- Family: Pieridae
- Genus: Delias
- Species: D. ninus

Binomial name
- Delias ninus (Wallace, 1867)

Synonyms
- Thyca ninus Wallace, 1867; Delias parthenia Staudinger, 1892

Species of butterfly

Delias ninus, the Malayan Jezebel, is a butterfly in the family Pieridae. It was described by Alfred Russel Wallace in 1867. It is found in the Indomalayan realm.

The wingspan is about 70–85 mm.

== Subspecies ==
- Delias ninus alluviorum Fruhstorfer, 1905 (western Sumatra)
- Delias ninus babai Yagishita, 1997 (Myanmar)
- Delias ninus ninus (Peninsular Malaysia)
- Delias ninus parthenia Staudinger, 1892 (northern Borneo)
- Delias ninus saranensis Yagishita, 1993 (Mt. Saran, western Kalimantan)
- Delias ninus shoujii Yagishita, 1993 (Mt. Bawang, western Kalimantan)
