= Delias itamputi =

- In Seitz

Scientific classification
- Kingdom: Animalia
- Phylum: Arthropoda
- Clade: Pancrustacea
- Class: Insecta
- Order: Lepidoptera
- Family: Pieridae
- Genus: Delias
- Species: D. itamputi

Binomial name
- Delias itamputi Ribbe, 1900

Species of butterfly

Delias itamputi is a butterfly in the family Pieridae. It was described by Carl Ribbe in 1900. It is endemic to Papua New Guinea. Sexes dimorphic, male above pure white with black, oblique, very broad apical spot. Female above as beneath, only with yellowish white base to both wings and in the distal margin of the hindwing without the subterminal row of white patches. Flies in May. Aroa River, British New Guinea. The name from the Malayan - black-white.
