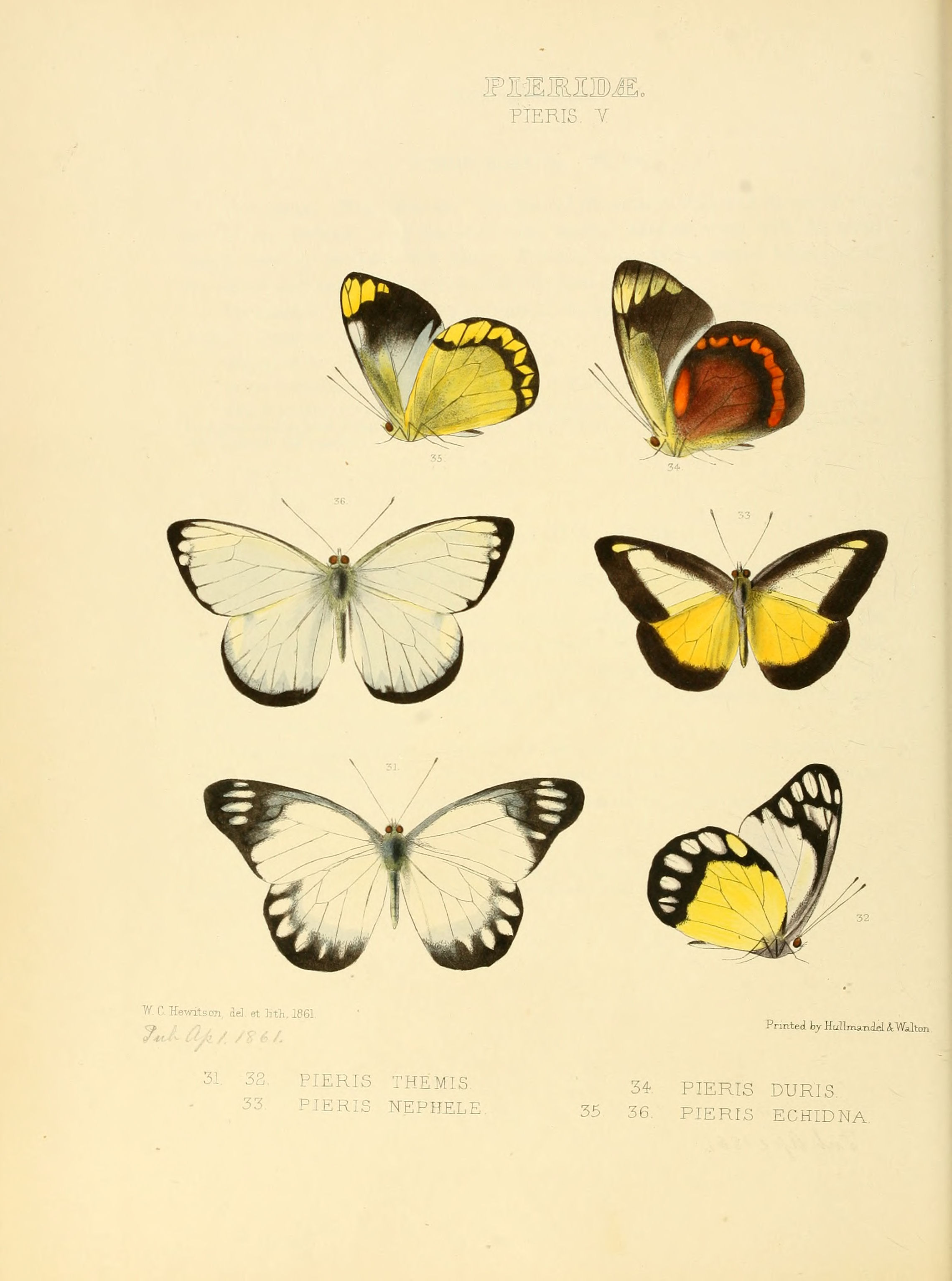
- In Hewitson's Illustrations of New Species of Exotic Butterflies

Scientific classification
- Kingdom: Animalia
- Phylum: Arthropoda
- Class: Insecta
- Order: Lepidoptera
- Family: Pieridae
- Genus: Delias
- Species: D. duris

Binomial name
- Delias duris (Hewitson, 1861)

Synonyms
- Pieris duris Hewitson, 1861

= Delias duris =

Species of butterfly

Delias duris is a butterfly in the family Pieridae. It was described by William Chapman Hewitson in 1861. It is found in the Australasian realm, where it is only known from Ceram Island, Indonesia.

== Description ==
Original Upperside. Male white, anterior wing with the costal and outer margins narrowly bordered with black except at the apex, where it is wider. Posterior wing with the outer margin slightly black. Underside black. Anterior wing with the base and a band near the apex (divided into five by the nervures) yellow irrorated with black. Posterior wing with the centre red-brown, an oval spot of scarlet near the base, and a zig-zag band of brick-red parallel to the outer margin. Expan. 3in. Hab. Ceram. In the Collections of W. W. Saunders and W. C. Hewitson

Seitz notes males and females with moderately narrow red submarginal band on the hindwing and broadly developed black margins and specimens with very broad and light red bands, without or with only a little proximal black bordering and very large dark instead of light yellow subapical and cell-spots on the underside of the forewing (= aleria form. nov.).
