= Delias hidecoae =

Scientific classification
- Domain: Eukaryota
- Kingdom: Animalia
- Phylum: Arthropoda
- Class: Insecta
- Order: Lepidoptera
- Family: Pieridae
- Genus: Delias
- Species: D. hidecoae

Binomial name
- Delias hidecoae Nakano 1993

Species of butterfly

Delias hidecoae is a species of pierine butterfly endemic to Mindoro in the Philippines. The type locality is Mount Halcon, Mindoro.

The wingspan is 70–80 mm.
