= Delias gilliardi =

Scientific classification
- Kingdom: Animalia
- Phylum: Arthropoda
- Class: Insecta
- Order: Lepidoptera
- Family: Pieridae
- Genus: Delias
- Species: D. gilliardi

Binomial name
- Delias gilliardi Sanford & Bennett, 1955

Species of butterfly

Delias gilliardi is a butterfly in the family Pieridae. It was described by Leonard J. Sanford and Neville Henry Bennett in 1955. It is found in Chimbu Province of Papua New Guinea.

The wingspan is about 65–70 mm.

== Taxonomy ==
gilliardi is a member of the Delias eichhorni species group.
