= Delias antara =

Scientific classification
- Kingdom: Animalia
- Phylum: Arthropoda
- Clade: Pancrustacea
- Class: Insecta
- Order: Lepidoptera
- Family: Pieridae
- Genus: Delias
- Species: D. antara

Binomial name
- Delias antara Roepke, 1955

Species of butterfly

Delias antara is a butterfly in the family Pieridae. It was described by Roepke in 1955. It is found in New Guinea.

The wingspan is about 56 mm. Adults are similar to Delias eichhorni.

== Subspecies ==
- D. a. antara (Central Mountains, Irian Jaya)
- D. a. solana Morinaka & Nakazawa, 1997 (Pass Valley, Irian Jaya)

== Taxonomy ==
antara is a member of the Delias eichhorni species group.
