= Delias sinak =

Scientific classification
- Kingdom: Animalia
- Phylum: Arthropoda
- Class: Insecta
- Order: Lepidoptera
- Family: Pieridae
- Genus: Delias
- Species: D. sinak

Binomial name
- Delias sinak Mastrigt, 1990

Synonyms
- Delias sagessa sinak Mastrigt, 1990

Species of butterfly

Delias sinak is a butterfly in the family Pieridae. It was described by Henricus Jacobus Gerardus van Mastrigt in 1990. It is found in Sinak-Mulia in Irian Jaya.

== Description ==
The wingspan is about 50 mm. Adults are similar to Delias sagessa.
