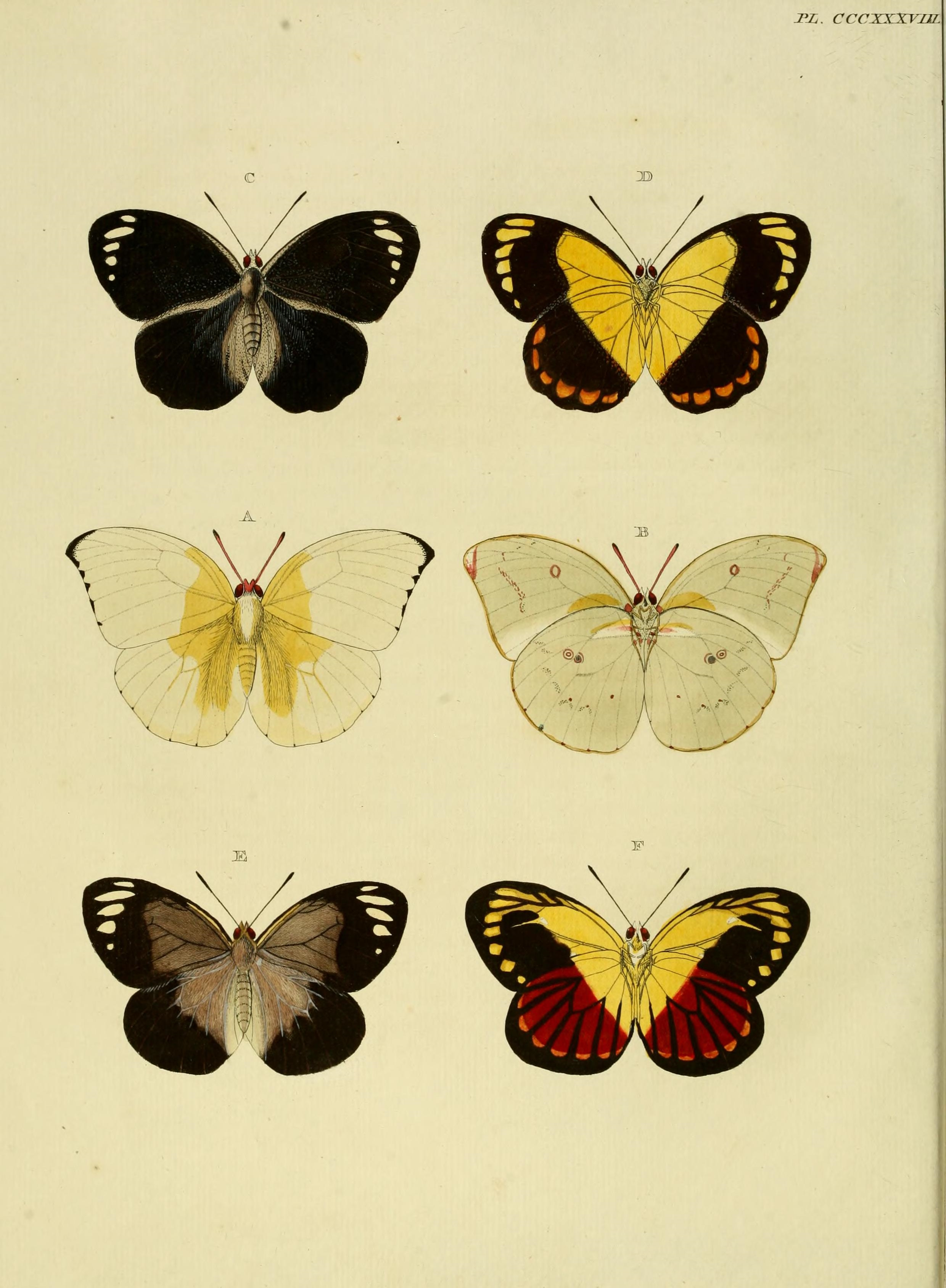
- In Pieter Cramer and Caspar Stoll's Uitlandsche Kapellen
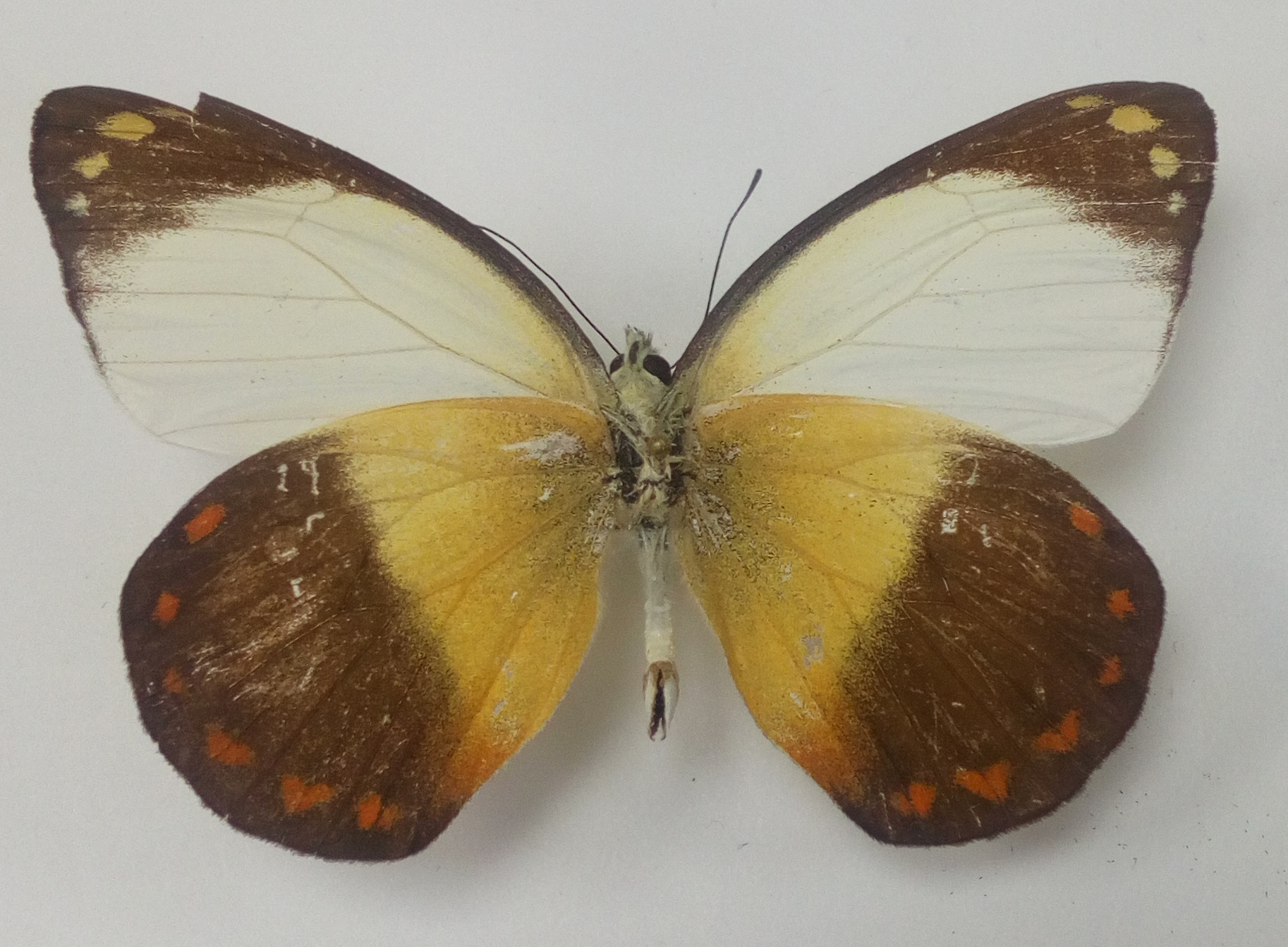

Scientific classification
- Kingdom: Animalia
- Phylum: Arthropoda
- Class: Insecta
- Order: Lepidoptera
- Family: Pieridae
- Genus: Delias
- Species: D. isse

Binomial name
- Delias isse (Cramer, 1775)

Synonyms
- Papilio isse Cramer, [1775]; Papilio isse f. bicolor Gmelin 1790; Thyca echo Wallace, 1867

= Delias isse =

Species of butterfly

Delias isse is a butterfly in the family Pieridae. It was described by Pieter Cramer in 1775. It is found in the Australasian realm.(Moluccas)

D. isse Cr. (55 a), common on the South Moluccas.The underside hindwing has a varyingly broad blackish-brown band from termen inwards equipped with paler subapical spots. The disc and basal areas are yellow . The under surface of isse is similar to that of echo Wall. [now ssp.] (53 e), from Buru, but the hindwing has a yellowish area of almost double the width, extending beyond the cell, and the submarginal spots are twice as broad and ochre-yellow. The wingspan is about 62–78 mm.

== Subspecies ==
- D. i. isse (Ambon, Serang, Gisser, Banda Islands)
- D. i. echo (Wallace, 1867) (Buru) underside forewing has a larger white area; small subapical spots.

== Taxonomy ==
isse is the nominotypical member of the Delias isse species group.
