= Delias putih =

Scientific classification
- Domain: Eukaryota
- Kingdom: Animalia
- Phylum: Arthropoda
- Class: Insecta
- Order: Lepidoptera
- Family: Pieridae
- Genus: Delias
- Species: D. putih

Binomial name
- Delias putih van Mastrigt, 1996

Synonyms
- Delias albertisi putih van Mastrigt, 1995

Species of butterfly

Delias putih is a butterfly in the family Pieridae. It was described by Henricus Jacobus Gerardus van Mastrigt in 1996. It is found in the Indomalayan realm.

== Description ==
Delias putih is a rare and distinctive member of the Delias genus of butterflies, standing out not only due to its scarcity but also its unique physical features. This butterfly is notably smaller in size compared to its close relative, Delias albertisi. The more compact frame of this species sets it apart within the Delias genus, which is known for its wide range of sizes and wing patterns.

One of the defining characteristics of Delias putih is its wing pattern. The butterfly's upperside is predominantly grey-black, giving it a more subdued appearance compared to the often bright and colorful species in the genus. The darker upper wings make this species blend more easily into shaded or forested environments. However, the underside of the wings offers a striking contrast where distinct rectangular apical dots is seen, which are characteristic of this species. These dots are arranged in a pattern that helps differentiate Delias putih from other species within the genus. The apical region of the forewings is where these rectangular markings are most prominent, adding to the butterfly's unique appearance.

== Habitat ==
Delias putih are located from the Weyland Mounts and the Paniai Mounts in West Papua, Indonesia (island of New Guinea), where it is typically found in forest or mountainous areas.

== Subspecies ==
- Delias albertisi putih (Papua)
- Delias albertisi tamamitsui Morita, 1996 (Papua)
