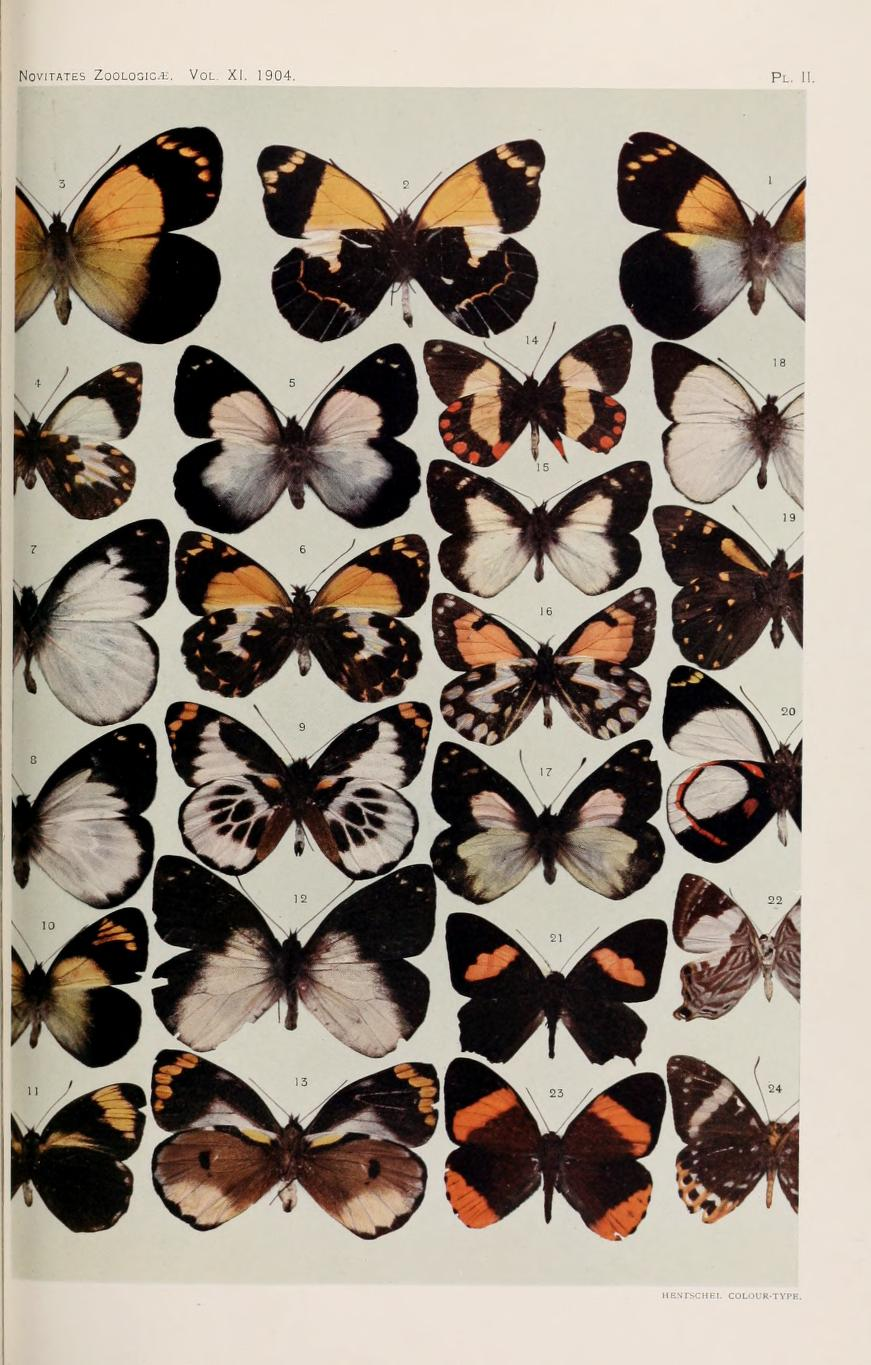
- Delias eichhorni in Novitates Zoologicae (7, 8, 9)

Scientific classification
- Domain: Eukaryota
- Kingdom: Animalia
- Phylum: Arthropoda
- Class: Insecta
- Order: Lepidoptera
- Family: Pieridae
- Genus: Delias
- Species: D. clathrata

Binomial name
- Delias clathrata Rothschild, 1904

= Delias clathrata =

Species of butterfly

Delias clathrata is a butterfly in the family Pieridae. It was described by Walter Rothschild in 1904. It is found in New Guinea.

The wingspan is about 60–66 mm. Adults are mostly white. The hindwings have a black discal area over which the white veins show out very strongly.

== Subspecies ==
- D. c. clathrata (Papua New Guinea: Aroa River)
- D. c. limata Jordan, 1930 (New Guinea: Herzog Mountains)
