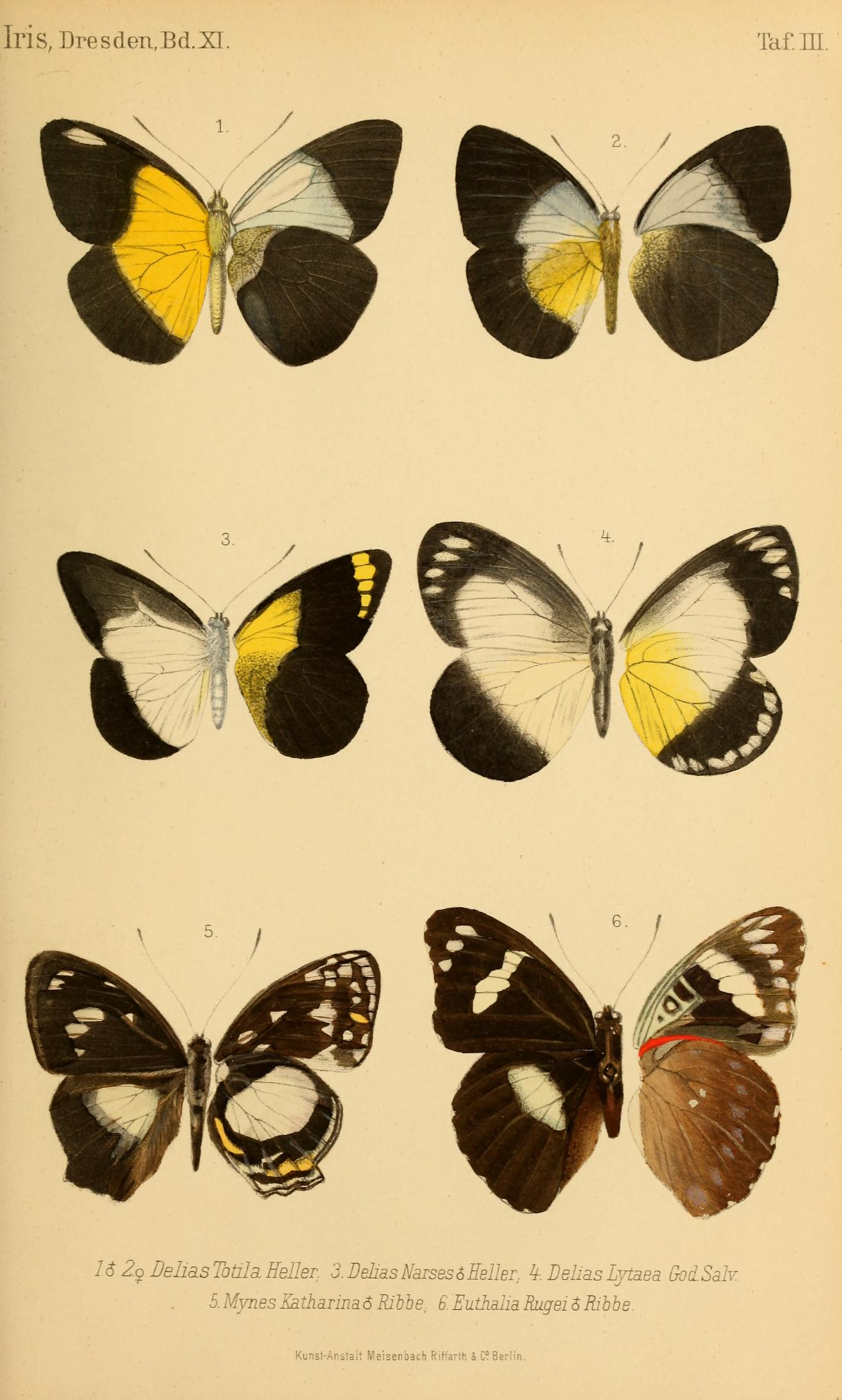
- Delias totila in Deutsche Entomologische Zeitschrift

Scientific classification
- Kingdom: Animalia
- Phylum: Arthropoda
- Class: Insecta
- Order: Lepidoptera
- Family: Pieridae
- Genus: Delias
- Species: D. totila

Binomial name
- Delias totila Heller, 1896

= Delias totila =

Species of butterfly

Delias totila is a butterfly in the family Pieridae. It was described by Karl Borromaeus Maria Josef Heller in 1896. It is endemic to New Britain. It is one of the darkest coloured species of Delias unusual in that the upperside is more colourful than the underside.The wings are half yellow, half black, with a blue-grey proximal area and a large elliptical white spot on the upper surface of the forewing. The base of the forewing beneath is white, but the upper surface of the hindwing is deep black almost all over, except for a slightly lighter, yellow-powdered and very restricted basal area.
