= Delias nieuwenhuisi =

Scientific classification
- Domain: Eukaryota
- Kingdom: Animalia
- Phylum: Arthropoda
- Class: Insecta
- Order: Lepidoptera
- Family: Pieridae
- Genus: Delias
- Species: D. nieuwenhuisi

Binomial name
- Delias nieuwenhuisi van Mastrigt, 1990

Synonyms
- Delias leucias roepkei Nieuwenhuis & Howarth, 1969 (preocc. Benneth, 1956)

Species of butterfly

Delias nieuwenhuisi is a butterfly in the family Pieridae. It was described by Henricus Jacobus Gerardus van Mastrigt in 1990. It is endemic to New Guinea.

The wingspan is about 38 mm.

== Subspecies ==
- Delias nieuwenhuisi nieuwenhuisi (Telefomin, Papua New Guinea)
- Delias nieuwenhuisi nose van Mastrigt, 2003 (Enga Province, Papua New Guinea)
- Delias nieuwenhuisi poponga van Mastrigt, 1990 (Star Mountains, West Irian)
