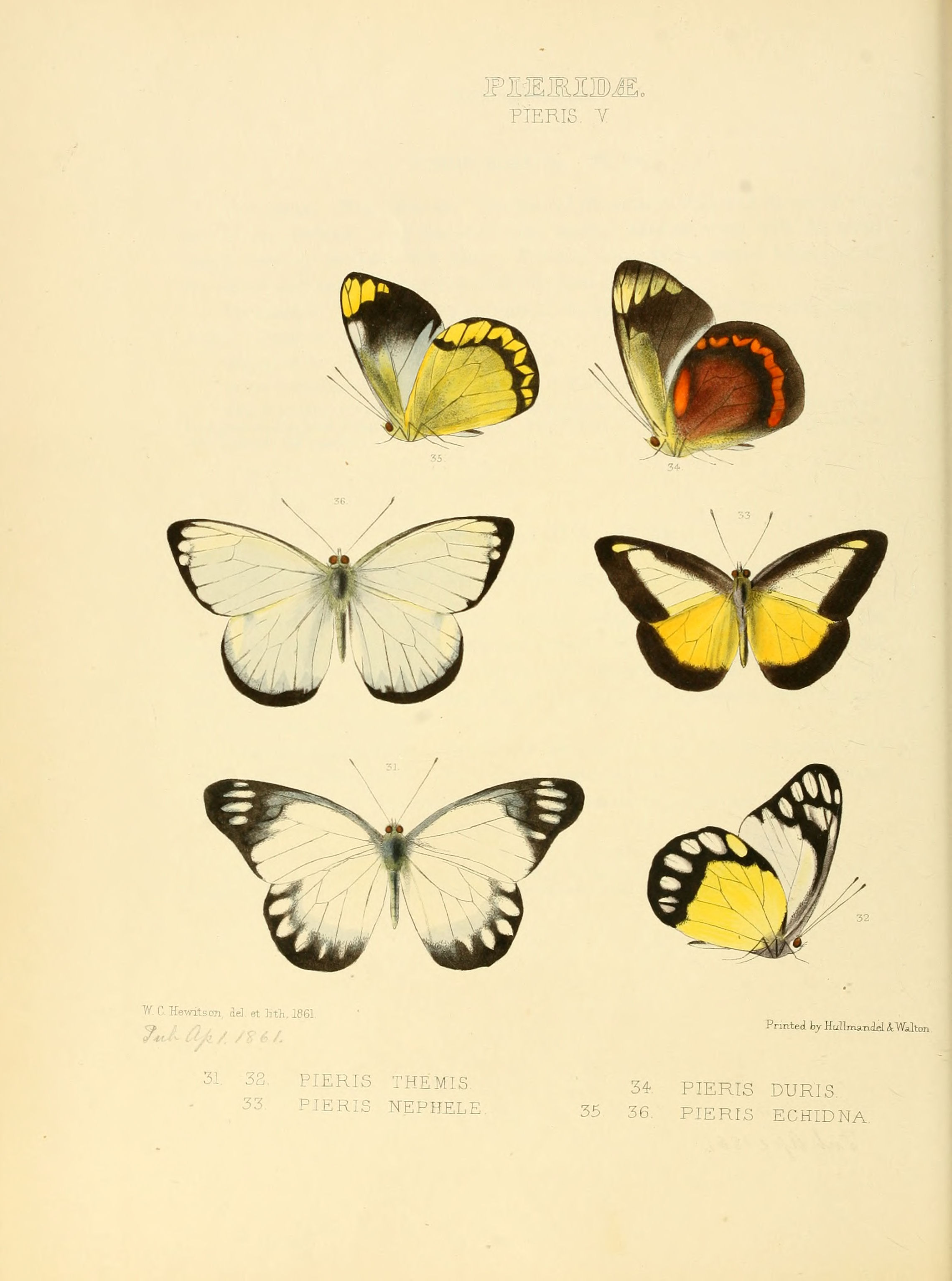
- In Hewitson's Illustrations of New Species of Exotic Butterflies

Scientific classification
- Kingdom: Animalia
- Phylum: Arthropoda
- Class: Insecta
- Order: Lepidoptera
- Family: Pieridae
- Genus: Delias
- Species: D. echidna

Binomial name
- Delias echidna (Hewitson, 1861)

Synonyms
- Pieris echidna Hewitson, 1861

= Delias echidna =

Species of butterfly

Delias echidna is a butterfly in the family Pieridae. It was described by William Chapman Hewitson in 1861. It is found in the Indomalayan realm (Serang) and the Australasian realm (Ambon); that is it is found on both sides of the Wallace line.

The wingspan is about 64–70 mm. The upper surface according to Hewitson is white, with black costal margin and finely dentate distal margin to the forewing. Hindwing likewise with black distal margin, which proximally is finely dusted with grey. The greater part of the underside hind wing is yellow.

Hewitson- Upperside. Male white. Anterior wing with the costal margin black, the outer margin black dentated inwardly at the apex. Posterior wing with the outer margin black bordered inwardly with grey. Underside. Anterior wing with the basal half grey, the cell tinted with yellow. The outer half black with a spot of white near the costal margin beyond the middle, and a band of bright yellow near the apex divided into five by the nervures which are black. Posterior wing green-yellow, the outer margin broadly black traversed by a zig-zag band of bright yellow divided into seven by the nervures. Hab. Ceram. Tn the Collection of A. R. Wallace.

== Subspecies ==
- D. e. echidna (Ceram)
- D. e. ambonensis Talbot, 1928 (Ambon)
