= List of butterflies of Papua New Guinea =

Location of Papua New Guinea

This is a list of butterflies of Papua New Guinea. This list includes species recorded from mainland Papua New Guinea, but also all islands that are part of the country, such as the Trobriand Islands, the D'Entrecasteaux Islands, the Louisiade Archipelago and the Bismarck Archipelago.

== Hesperiidae ==
=== Pyrginae ===
- Chaetocneme antipodes
  - Chaetocneme antipodes antipodes (Guérin-Méneville, 1831)
  - Chaetocneme antipodes biaka (Joicey & Talbot, 1916)
- Chaetocneme caristus Hewitson, 1867
- Chaetocneme critomedia (Guérin-Méneville, 1831)
- Chaetocneme editus (Plötz, 1885)
- Chaetocneme helirius (Cramer, 1775)
- Chaetocneme lunula (Mabille, 1888)
- Chaetocneme morea Evans, 1934
- Chaetocneme naevifera dissimilis (Swinhoe, 1905)
- Chaetocneme sombra (Evans, 1934)
- Chaetocneme tenuis
  - Chaetocneme tenuis hibernia (Evans, 1934)
  - Chaetocneme tenuis tenuis (Eecke, 1924)
- Chaetocneme trifenestrata (Fruhstorfer, 1910)
- Chaetocneme triton (Boisduval, 1832)
- Netrocoryne thaddeus (Hewitson, 1876)
- Tagiades japetus
  - Tagiades japetus hovia (Swinhoe, 1904)
  - Tagiades japetus inconspicua (Rothschild, 1915)
  - Tagiades japetus janetta (Butler, 1870)
  - Tagiades japetus mathias Evans, 1934
- Tagiades nestus
  - Tagiades nestus brunta Evans, 1949
  - Tagiades nestus korela (Mabille, 1891)
  - Tagiades nestus presbyter (Butler, 1882)
  - Tagiades nestus suffusus (Rothschild, 1915)
- Tagiades trebellius
  - Tagiades trebellius canonicus Fruhstorfer, 1910
  - Tagiades trebellius lola Evans, 1949
  - Tagiades trebellius vella (Evans, 1934)

=== Coeliadinae ===
- Allora doleschallii albertisi (Oberthür, 1880)
- Allora major
  - Allora major lectra Evans, 1949
  - Allora major major (Rothschild, 1916)
  - Allora major talesia Evans, 1949
- Badamia exclamationis (Fabricius, 1775)
- Choaspes hemixanthus hemixanthus Rothschild, 1903
- Choaspes illuensis ornatus Rothschild, 1903
- Hasora buina Evans, 1928
- Hasora celaenus (Stoll, 1782)
- Hasora chromus
  - Hasora chromus bilunata (Butler, 1883)
  - Hasora chromus chromus (Cramer, 1782)
- Hasora discolor
  - Hasora discolor eira Evans, 1949
  - Hasora discolor mastusia Fruhstorfer, 1911
- Hasora hurama
  - Hasora hurama hurama (Butler, 1870)
  - Hasora hurama kieta (Strand, 1921)
- Hasora khoda
  - Hasora khoda dampierensis Rothschild, 1915
  - Hasora khoda linda Evans, 1934
- Hasora lavella Evans, 1928
- Hasora proxissima takwa Evans, 1949
- Hasora subcaelestis Rothschild, 1916
- Hasora taminatus dipama Fruhstorfer, 1911
- Hasora thridas
  - Hasora thridas chalybeata Joicey & Talbot, 1917
  - Hasora thridas thridas (Boisduval, 1832)
- Hasora vitta simillima Rothschild, 1916

=== Trapezitinae ===
- Felicena dirpha
  - Felicena dirpha albicilla (Joicey & Talbot, 1917)
  - Felicena dirpha dirpha (Boisduval, 1832)
  - Felicena dirpha nota Evans, 1949
- Felicena dora Evans, 1949
- Hewitsoniella migonitis (Hewitson, 1876)
- Rachelia extrusa (C. & R. Felder, 1867)
- Rachelia icosia (Fruhstorfer, 1911)
- Toxidia arfakensis (Joicey & Talbot, 1917)
- Toxidia inornata sekara (Plötz, 1885)

=== Hesperiinae ===
- Arrhenes dschilus
  - Arrhenes dschilus decor (Evans, 1934)
  - Arrhenes dschilus dschilus (Plötz, 1885)
- Arrhenes elena Evans, 1934
- Arrhenes germana (Rothschild, 1916)
- Arrhenes marnas (C Felder, 1860)
- Arrhenes martha Evans, 1934
- Arrhenes tranquilla (Rothschild, 1916)
- Borbo cinnara (Wallace & Moore, 1866)
- Borbo impar tetragraphus (Mabille, 1891)
- Caltoris boisduvalii hilda (Evans, 1937)
- Caltoris philippina subfenestrata (Röber, 1891)
- Cephrenes augiades
  - Cephrenes augiades bruno Evans, 1935
  - Cephrenes augiades meeki Evans, 1935
  - Cephrenes augiades websteri Evans, 1935
- Cephrenes augusta Evans, 1934
- Cephrenes moseleyi (Butler, 1884)
- Cephrenes shortlandica (Swinhoe, 1915)
- Cephrenes trichopepla trichopepla (Lower, 1908)
- Erionota thrax (Linnaeus, 1767)
- Kobrona eva Evans, 1935
- Kobrona idea Evans, 1949
- Kobrona infralutea (Rothschild, 1916)
- Kobrona kobros kobros (Plötz, 1885)
- Kobrona pansa pansa Evans, 1934
- Kobrona rasta Evans, 1935
- Kobrona wama rudha (Fruhstorfer, 1911)
- Mimene albiclavata (Butler, 1882)
- Mimene atropatene (Fruhstorfer, 1911)
- Mimene basalis basalis (Rothschild, 1916)
- Mimene biakensis biakensis Joicey & Talbot, 1917
- Mimene caesar Evans, 1935
- Mimene celia Evans, 1935
- Mimene celiaba Parsons, 1986
- Mimene cyanea (Evans, 1928)
- Mimene kolbei
  - Mimene kolbei kolbei (Ribbe, 1899)
  - Mimene kolbei tenebricosa (Mabille, 1904)
- Mimene lysima (Swinhoe, 1905)
- Mimene melie (de Nicéville, 1895)
- Mimene milnea Evans, 1935
- Mimene miltias (Kirsch, 1877)
- Mimene orida (Boisduval, 1832)
- Mimene waigeuensis Joicey & Talbot, 1917
- Mimene wandammenensis Joicey & Talbot, 1917
- Notocrypta aluensis Swinhoe, 1907
- Notocrypta caerulea Evans, 1928
- Notocrypta flavipes (Janson, 1886)
- Notocrypta maria Evans, 1949
- Notocrypta renardi (Oberthür, 1880)
- Notocrypta waigensis waigensis (Plötz, 1882)
- Ocybadistes ardea Bethune-Baker, 1906
- Ocybadistes flavovittatus
  - Ocybadistes flavovittatus flavovittatus (Latreille, 1824)
  - Ocybadistes flavovittatus kokoda Evans, 1949
- Ocybadistes walkeri walkeri Heron, 1894
- Pastria albimedia (Joicey & Talbot, 1917)
- Pelopidas agna
  - Pelopidas agna agnata Evans, 1937
  - Pelopidas agna dingo Evans, 1949
- Pelopidas lyelli lyelli (Rothschild, 1915)
- Pelopidas mathias repetita (Butler, 1882)
- Potanthus taxilus ahrendti (Plötz, 1883)
- Potanthus fettingi ahrendti (Plötz, 1883)
- Sabera aruana aruana (Plötz, 1886)
- Sabera biaga Evans, 1949
- Sabera caesina
  - Sabera caesina barina Fruhstorfer, 1910
  - Sabera caesina louisa Evans, 1935
  - Sabera caesina sudesta Evans, 1935
- Sabera dobboe
  - Sabera dobboe dobboe (Plötz, 1885)
  - Sabera dobboe hanova Evans, 1949
- Sabera dorena Evans, 1935
- Sabera expansa Evans, 1935
- Sabera fuliginosa chota Evans, 1949
- Sabera fusca Joicey & Talbot, 1917
- Sabera kumpia kumpia Evans, 1949
- Sabera misola Evans, 1949
- Sabera tabla (Swinhoe, 1905)
- Suniana sunias
  - Suniana sunias isabella Evans, 1934
  - Suniana sunias nihana (Fruhstorfer, 1910)
  - Suniana sunias tanus (Plötz, 1885)
- Taractrocera dolon (Plötz, 1884)
- Telicota angiana Evans, 1934
- Telicota argeus
  - Telicota argeus argeus (Plötz, 1883)
  - Telicota argeus zara (Evans, 1949)
- Telicota brachydesma Lower, 1908
- Telicota colon vega Evans, 1949
- Telicota elsa Evans, 1934
- Telicota eurotas eurotas (Felder, 1860)
- Telicota gervasa Evans, 1949
- Telicota ixion (Evans, 1949)
- Telicota kaimana Evans, 1934
- Telicota kezia
  - Telicota kezia kezia Evans, 1949
  - Telicota kezia lenna Evans, 1949
- Telicota melanion melanion (Mabille, 1878)
- Telicota paceka
  - Telicota paceka affinis Rothschild, 1916
  - Telicota paceka cadmus (Evans, 1934)
  - Telicota paceka paceka Fruhstorfer, 1911
- Telicota sadra Evans, 1949
- Telicota sadrella Parsons, 1986
- Telicota solva (Evans, 1949)
- Telicota subha (Fruhstorfer, 1911)
- Telicota ternatensis moorei Rothschild, 1916
- Telicota vinta Evans, 1949

== Papilionidae ==
=== Papilioninae ===
- Chilasa moerneri
  - Chilasa moerneri mayrhoferi (Bang-Haas, 1939)
  - Chilasa moerneri moerneri (Aurivillius, 1919)
- Chilasa toboroi toboroi (Ribbe, 1907)
- Cressida cressida troilus (Butler, 1876)
- Graphium agamemnon
  - Graphium agamemnon admiralis (Rothschild, 1915)
  - Graphium agamemnon ligatus Rothschild, 1895
  - Graphium agamemnon neopommerania (Honrath, 1887)
  - Graphium agamemnon salomonis Rothschild, 1895
- Graphium aristeus
  - Graphium aristeus parmatus (Gray, 1852)
  - Graphium aristeus paron (Godman & Salvin, 1879)
- Graphium browni (Godman & Salvin, 1879)
- Graphium codrus
  - Graphium codrus auratus (Rothschild, 1898)
  - Graphium codrus gabriellae Racheli, 1979
  - Graphium codrus medon (C & R Felder, 1864)
  - Graphium codrus schoutensis Talbot & Joicey, 1916
  - Graphium codrus segonax (Godman & Salvin, 1878)
- Graphium eurypylus
  - Graphium eurypylus extensus (Rothschild, 1895)
  - Graphium eurypylus lycaonides (Rothschild, 1895)
- Graphium felixi (Joicey & Noakes, 1915)
- Graphium hicetaon (Mathew, 1886)
- Graphium kosii Muller & Tennent, 1999
- Graphium macfarlanei
  - Graphium macfarlanei admiralia (Rothschild, 1915)
  - Graphium macfarlanei macfarlanei (Butler, 1877)
  - Graphium macfarlanei seminigra (Butler, 1882)
- Graphium meeki inexpectatum Miller & Miller, 1981
- Graphium sarpedon
  - Graphium sarpedon choredon (C & R Felder, 1864)
  - Graphium sarpedon imparilis (Rothschild, 1895)
  - Graphium sarpedon isander (Godman & Salvin, 1888)
  - Graphium sarpedon messogis (Fruhstorfer, 1907)
- Graphium thule (Wallace, 1865)
- Graphium wallacei wallacei (Hewitson, 1858)
- Graphium weiskei
  - Graphium weiskei goodenovii (Rothschild, 1915)
  - Graphium weiskei weiskei (Ribbe, 1900)
- Ornithoptera chimaera
  - Ornithoptera chimaera charybdis van Eecke, 1915
  - Ornithoptera chimaera chimaera (Rothschild, 1902)
  - Ornithoptera chimaera draco Rousseau-Decelle, 1935
- Ornithoptera goliath
  - Ornithoptera goliath atlas Rothschild, 1908
  - Ornithoptera goliath goliath (Oberthür, 1888)
  - Ornithoptera goliath samson Niepelt, 1913
  - Ornithoptera goliath supremus Röber, 1896
- Ornithoptera meridionalis tarunggarensis Joicey & Talbot, 1927
- Ornithoptera paradisea
  - Ornithoptera paradisea arfakensis Joicey & Talbot, 1915
  - Ornithoptera paradisea chrysanthemum Kobayashi et al.,1986
  - Ornithoptera paradisea demeter So & Sato, 1998
  - Ornithoptera paradisea flavescens Rothschild, 1897
  - Ornithoptera paradisea paradisea (Staudinger, 1893)
- Ornithoptera priamus
  - Ornithoptera priamus admiralitatis (Rothschild, 1915)
  - Ornithoptera priamus aureus Parrot, 1988
  - Ornithoptera priamus boisduvalii (Montrouzier, 1856)
  - Ornithoptera priamus bornemanni (Pagenstecher, 1894)
  - Ornithoptera priamus caelestis (Rothschild, 1898)
  - Ornithoptera priamus miokensis (Ribbe, 1898)
  - Ornithoptera priamus poseidon (Doubleday, 1847)
  - Ornithoptera priamus sterrensis Parrot, 1990
  - Ornithoptera priamus teucrus Joicey & Talbot, 1916
  - Ornithoptera priamus urvillianus (Guérin-Méneville, 1838)
  - Ornithoptera priamus wituensis D'Abrera, 2003
- Ornithoptera rothschildi (Kenrick, 1911)
- Ornithoptera tithonus
  - Ornithoptera tithonus cytherea Kobayashi et al.,1986
  - Ornithoptera tithonus dominici Schäffler, 1999
  - Ornithoptera tithonus tithonus (De Haan, 1841)
  - Ornithoptera tithonus waigeuensis Rothschild, 1897
- Ornithoptera victoriae regis (Rothschild, 1895)
- Pachliopta polydorus
  - Pachliopta polydorus aignanus (Rothschild, 1898)
  - Pachliopta polydorus aphnitis (Fruhstorfer, 1913)
  - Pachliopta polydorus asinius (Fruhstorfer, 1904)
  - Pachliopta polydorus auster (van Eecke,1915)
  - Pachliopta polydorus ceramites (Fruhstorfer, 1915)
  - Pachliopta polydorus godartianus (Lucas, 1852)
  - Pachliopta polydorus humboldti (Rothschild, 1908)
  - Pachliopta polydorus leodamas (Wallace, 1865)
  - Pachliopta polydorus mamberanus (Toxopeus, 1950)
  - Pachliopta polydorus manus (Talbot, 1932)
  - Pachliopta polydorus meforanus (Rothschild, 1908)
  - Pachliopta polydorus naissus (Fruhstorfer, 1908)
  - Pachliopta polydorus novobritannicus (Rothschild, 1895)
  - Pachliopta polydorus polypemon (Mathew, 1887)
  - Pachliopta polydorus schoutensis (Joicey & Talbot, 1924)
  - Pachliopta polydorus wangaarensis (Joicey & Talbot, 1924)
- Papilio aegeus
  - Papilio aegeus aegatinus Rothschild, 1908
  - Papilio aegeus oritas (Godman & Salvin, 1879)
  - Papilio aegeus ormenus (Guérin-Méneville, 1831)
  - Papilio aegeus othello Grose-Smith, 1894
  - Papilio aegeus websteri (Grose-Smith, 1894)
- Papilio albinus albinus Wallace, 1865
- Papilio ambrax
  - Papilio ambrax ambrax Boisduval, 1832
  - Papilio ambrax artanus Rothschild, 1908
  - Papilio ambrax dunali (Montrouzier, 1856)
- Papilio bridgei bridgei Mathew, 1886
- Papilio cartereti (Oberthür, 1914)
- Papilio deiphobus
  - Papilio deiphobus aristartus Fruhstorfer, 1916
  - Papilio deiphobus deipylus C.& R.Felder, 1864
  - Papilio deiphobus efbensis Talbot, 1932
- Papilio demoleus
  - Papilio demoleus demoleus Linnaeus, 1758
  - Papilio demoleus novoguineensis Rothschild, 1908
- Papilio euchenor
  - Papilio euchenor comma Joicey & Noakes, 1915
  - Papilio euchenor depilis Rothschild, 1895
  - Papilio euchenor euchenor Guérin-Méneville, 1830
  - Papilio euchenor eutropius Janson, 1886
  - Papilio euchenor godartii (Montrouzier, 1856)
  - Papilio euchenor misimanus Rothschild, 1898
  - Papilio euchenor misolensis Rothschild, 1908
  - Papilio euchenor neohannoveranus Rothschild, 1898
  - Papilio euchenor novohibernicus Rothschild, 1896
  - Papilio euchenor rosselanus Rothschild, 1908
  - Papilio euchenor sudestensis Rothschild, 1908
- Papilio fuscus
  - Papilio fuscus beccarii Oberthür, 1880
  - Papilio fuscus cilix (Godman & Salvin, 1879)
  - Papilio fuscus hasterti (Ribbe, 1907)
  - Papilio fuscus indicatus (Butler, 1876)
  - Papilio fuscus lamponius (Fruhstorfer, 1904)
  - Papilio fuscus offakus Fruhstorfer, 1904
- Papilio laglaizei laglaizei Depuiset, 1877
- Papilio lorquinianus
  - Papilio lorquinianus albertisi Oberthür, 1880
  - Papilio lorquinianus apollodorus Fruhstorfer, 1909
  - Papilio lorquinianus dewaro Joicey & Talbot, 1922
  - Papilio lorquinianus ochoco Shimogori,1997
- Papilio phestus
  - Papilio phestus minusculus (Ribbe, 1898)
  - Papilio phestus parkinsoni (Honrath, 1886)
  - Papilio phestus phestus Guérin-Méneville, 1831
  - Papilio phestus reductus Rothschild, 1915
- Papilio ulysses
  - Papilio ulysses ambiguus Rothschild, 1895
  - Papilio ulysses autolycus C.& R.Felder, 1865
  - Papilio ulysses dirce Jordan, 1909
  - Papilio ulysses denticulatus Joicey & Talbot, 1916
  - Papilio ulysses gabrielis Rothschild, 1898
  - Papilio ulysses orsippus (Godman & Salvin, 1888)
  - Papilio ulysses telemachus (Montrouzier, 1856)
- Papilio woodfordi woodfordi Godman & Salvin, 1888
- Troides oblongomaculatus
  - Troides oblongomaculatus oblongomaculatus (Goeze, 1779)
  - Troides oblongomaculatus papuensis (Wallace, 1865)

== Pieridae ==
=== Coliadinae ===
- Catopsilia pomona (Fabricius, 1775)
- Catopsilia scylla etesia (Hewitson, 1867)
- Catopsilia pyranthe (Linnaeus, 1758)
- Eurema alitha novaguineensis Shirozu & Yata, 1982
- Eurema blanda saraha (Fruhstorfer, 1912)
- Eurema brigitta sincera Shirôzu & Yata, 1982
- Eurema candida
  - Eurema candida salomonis (Butler, 1898)
  - Eurema candida xanthomelaena (Godman & Salvin, 1879)
- Eurema hecabe
  - Eurema hecabe kerawara Ribbe, 1898
  - Eurema hecabe nivaria (Fruhstorfer, 1910)
  - Eurema hecabe oeta (Fruhstorfer, 1910)
- Eurema puella
  - Eurema puella brandti Tennent, 2004
  - Eurema puella diotima (Fruhstorfer, 1910)
  - Eurema puella misima Tennent, 2004
- Gandaca butyrosa aiguina Fruhstorfer, 1910

=== Pierinae ===
- Appias ada
  - Appias ada florentia Grose-Smith, 1896
  - Appias ada thasia (Fruhstorfer, 1901)
- Appias albina albina (Boisduval, 1836)
- Appias celestina
  - Appias celestina celestina (Boisduval, 1832)
  - Appias celestina eumilis (Boisduval, 1832)
  - Appias celestina orientalis (Rothschild, 1915)
- Appias leis saina Grose-Smith, 1894
- Appias paulina albina (Boisduval, 1836)
- Belenois java
  - Belenois java peristhene (Boisduval, 1859)
  - Belenois java picata (Butler, 1882)
  - Belenois java teutonia (Fabricius, 1775)
- Cepora abnormis (Wallace, 1867)
- Cepora aspasia (Stoll, 1790)
- Cepora perimale
  - Cepora perimale agnata (Grose-Smith, 1889)
  - Cepora perimale dohertyana (Grose-Smith, 1894)
  - Cepora perimale latilimbata (Butler, 1876)
  - Cepora perimale leucophora (Grose-Smith, 1897)
  - Cepora perimale quadricolor (Salvin & Godman, 1877)
  - Cepora perimale wallaceana (C. & R. Felder, 1865)
- Delias abrophora
  - Delias abrophora abrophora Roepke, 1955
  - Delias abrophora bugebu Van Mastrigt, 1996
  - Delias abrophora okbibab Van Mastrigt, 1996
- Delias alberti guava Arora, 1983
- Delias albertisi
  - Delias albertisi albertisi (Oberthür, 1880)
  - Delias albertisi albiplaga Joicey & Talbot, 1922
  - Delias albertisi putih Van Mastrigt, 1996
  - Delias albertisi tamamitsui Morita, 1996
- Delias alepa
  - Delias alepa alepa Jordan, [1912]
  - Delias alepa kunupiensis Joicey & Talbot, 1922
  - Delias alepa orthobasis Roepke, 1955
- Delias angiensis Talbot, 1928
- Delias antara
  - Delias antara antara Roepke, 1955
  - Delias antara solana Morinaka & Nakazawa, 1997
- Delias arabuana
  - Delias arabuana arabuana Roepke, 1955
  - Delias arabuana asawaorum Morita, 1996
  - Delias arabuana modioensis Van Mastrigt, [1988]
- Delias arfakensis Joicey & Talbot, 1922
- Delias argentata
  - Delias argentata argentata Roepke, 1955
  - Delias argentata clutus Yagishita, 1993
- Delias argenthona balli Hulstaert, 1923
- Delias aroae
  - Delias aroae aroae Ribbe, 1901
  - Delias aroae yabensis Joicey & Talbot, 1922
- Delias aruna
  - Delias aruna aruna (Boisduval, 1832)
  - Delias aruna inferna Butler, 1871
  - Delias aruna rona Rothschild, 1898
- Delias autumnalis
  - Delias autumnalis autumnalis Roepke, 1955
  - Delias autumnalis hiberna Van Mastrigt, 2000
  - Delias autumnalis michiae Nakano, 1994
- Delias awongkor awongkor Van Mastrigt, [1988]
- Delias bagoe
  - Delias bagoe bagoe (Boisduval, 1832)
  - Delias bagoe restricta Rothschild, 1915
- Delias bakeri Kenrick, 1909
- Delias biaka Joicey & Noakes, 1915
- Delias bobaga
  - Delias bobaga bobaga Van Mastrigt, 1990
  - Delias bobaga homeyo Van Mastrigt, 1996
- Delias bosnikiana Joicey & Noakes, 1915
- Delias bothwelli Kenrick, 1909
- Delias brandti Muller, 2001
- Delias caliban
  - Delias caliban caliban Grose-Smith, 1897
  - Delias caliban satisbona Rothschild, 1915
- Delias callista
  - Delias callista callipareia Roepke, 1955
  - Delias callista callista Jordan, [1912]
  - Delias callista callipulchra Gerrits & Van Mastrigt, [1993]
  - Delias callista miyashitai Yagishita, 1993
- Delias campbelli
  - Delias campbelli campbelli Joicey & Talbot, 1922
  - Delias campbelli microleuca Roepke, 1955
- Delias caroli
  - Delias caroli caroli Kenrick, 1909
  - Delias caroli wandammenensae Joicey & Talbot, 1916
- Delias carstensziana
  - Delias carstensziana carstensziana Rothschild, 1915
  - Delias carstensziana starensis Lachlan, 2000
- Delias castaneus Kenrick, 1909
- Delias catisa
  - Delias catisa aurostriga Roepke, 1955
  - Delias catisa catisa Jordan, [1912]
  - Delias catisa morinakai Yagishita, 1993
  - Delias catisa sumbole Van Mastrigt, 2001
  - Delias catisa wisseliana Roepke, 1955
- Delias catocausta
  - Delias catocausta catocausta Jordan, [1912]
  - Delias catocausta eefi Van Mastrigt, 1990
- Delias cumanau Van Mastrigt, 2006
- Delias cyclosticha Roepke, 1955
- Delias daniensis Van Mastrigt, 2003
- Delias destrigata Van Mastrigt, 1996
- Delias dice
  - Delias dice dice (Vollenhoven, 1865)
  - Delias dice fulvoflava Rothschild, 1915
  - Delias dice latimarginata Joicey & Talbot, 1922
  - Delias dice latoclavata Van Eecke, 1924
  - Delias dice mitisana Strand, 1916
  - Delias dice rectifascia Talbot, 1928
  - Delias dice samarai Joicey & Talbot, 1916
- Delias discus
  - Delias discus apodiscus Roepke, 1955
  - Delias discus discoides Talbot, 1937
  - Delias discus discus Honrath, 1886
  - Delias discus larseni Lück& Gehlen, 1911
- Delias dixeyi Kenrick, 1909
- Delias dohertyi
  - Delias dohertyi dohertyi Oberthür, 1894
  - Delias dohertyi knowlei Joicey & Noakes, 1915
- Delias dortheysi Van Mastrigt, 2002
- Delias durai Van Mastrigt, 2006
- Delias eichhorni
  - Delias eichhorni eichhorni Rothschild, 1904
  - Delias eichhorni kerowagi Morinaka, Mastrigt & Sibatani, 1993
  - Delias eichhorni hagenensis Morinaka, Mastrigt & Sibatani, 1993
- Delias elongatus Kenrick, 1911
- Delias ennia
  - Delias ennia ennia Wallace, 1867
  - Delias ennia iere Grose-Smith, 1900
  - Delias ennia jobiana (Oberthür, 1894)
  - Delias ennia limbata Rothschild, 1915
  - Delias ennia multicolor Joicey & Noakes, 1915
  - Delias ennia mysolensis Rothschild, 1915
  - Delias ennia oetakwensis Rothschild, 1915
  - Delias ennia saturata Rothschild, 1915
- Delias enniana
  - Delias enniana contracta Talbot, 1928
  - Delias enniana enniana (Oberthür, 1880)
  - Delias enniana hidehitoi Morita, 2003
  - Delias enniana kapaura Rothschild, 1915
  - Delias enniana majoripuncta Joicey & Talbot, 1922
  - Delias enniana obsoleta Rothschild, 1915
  - Delias enniana reducta Rothschild, 1915
- Delias euphemia Grose-Smith, 1894
- Delias eximia Rothschild, 1915
- Delias fascelis
  - Delias fascelis amungme Van Mastrigt, 1996
  - Delias fascelis citrona Joicey & Talbot, 1922
  - Delias fascelis fascelis Jordan, [1912]
  - Delias fascelis ibelana Roepke, 1955
  - Delias fascelis korupun Van Mastrigt, 1996
  - Delias fascelis paniaia Schmitt, 1992
- Delias fioretti Van Mastrigt, 1996
- Delias flavistriga
  - Delias flavistriga flavistriga Roepke, 1955
  - Delias flavistriga ilagaensis Van Mastrigt, [1988]
- Delias fojaensis Van Mastrigt, 2006
- Delias frater
  - Delias frater far Schröder& Treadaway, 1982
  - Delias frater frater Jordan, [1912]
  - Delias frater soror Toxopeus, 1944
- Delias gabia
  - Delias gabia aurantimacula Joicey & Talbot, 1922
  - Delias gabia callistrate (Grose-Smith, 1897)
  - Delias gabia felsina Fruhstorfer, 1910
  - Delias gabia gabia (Boisduval, 1832)
  - Delias gabia marinda Hulstaert, 1924
  - Delias gabia zarate Grose-Smith, 1900
- Delias geraldina
  - Delias geraldina masakoae Nakano, 1998
  - Delias geraldina onin Yagishita, 2003
  - Delias geraldina siderea Roepke, 1955
  - Delias geraldina vaneechoudi Roepke, 1955
  - Delias geraldina vogelcopensis Yagishita, 1993
- Delias germana Roepke, 1955
- Delias hapalina adnexa Roepke, 1955
- Delias hapalina amoena Roepke, 1955
- Delias hapalina hapalina Jordan, [1912]
- Delias hapalina kaloni Gotts & Ginn, 2004
- Delias heliophora Roepke, 1955
- Delias hemianops Gerrits & Van Mastrigt, [1993]
- Delias heroni Kenrick, 1909
- Delias hiemalis flabella Van Mastrigt, 1996
- Delias hiemalis hiemalis Roepke, 1955
- Delias hiemalis labbei Van Mastrigt, 2000
- Delias hiemalis nemangkawi Van Mastrigt, 2000
- Delias hikarui Yagishita, 1993
- Delias hypomelas conversa Jordan, [1912]
- Delias hypomelas fulgida Roepke, 1955
- Delias hypomelas lieftincki Roepke, 1955
- Delias hypomelas rubrostriata Joicey& Talbot, 1922
- Delias hypoxantha Roepke, 1955
- Delias iltis sibil Van Mastrigt, 1996
- Delias imitator Kenrick, 1911
- Delias inexpectata Rothschild, 1915
- Delias inopinata orri Van Mastrigt, 2003
- Delias isocharis latiapicalis Joicey & Talbot, 1922
- Delias jordani Kenrick, 1909
- Delias kenricki Talbot, 1937
- Delias klossi chrysanthemum Roepke, 1955
- Delias klossi gome Van Mastrigt, 2000
- Delias klossi klossi Rothschild, 1915
- Delias kristianiae Van Mastrigt, 2006
- Delias kummeri athena Yagishita, 2003
- Delias kummeri chiekoae Nakano, 1995
- Delias kummeri fumosa Roepke, 1955
- Delias kummeri highlandensis Yagishita, 1993
- Delias kummeri rouffaer Yagishita, 1993
- Delias kummeri similis Talbot, 1928
- Delias ladas fakfakensis Yagishita, 2003
- Delias ladas ladas Smith, 1894
- Delias ladas levis Joicey & Talbot, 1922
- Delias ladas waigeuensis Joicey & Talbot, 1917
- Delias ladas wamenaensis Morita, 1993
- Delias ladas yapenensis Yagishita, 1998
- Delias langda langda Gerrits & Van Mastrigt, [1993]
- Delias langda watlangku Gerrits & Van Mastrigt, [1993]
- Delias lara lara (Boisduval, 1836)
- Delias lecerfi Joicey & Talbot, 1922
- Delias leucias leucias Jordan, [1912]
- Delias leucias torini Gotts & Ginn, 2004
- Delias leucobalia distincta Rothschild, 1915
- Delias leucobalia ericetorum Roepke, 1955
- Delias ligata dealbata Talbot, 1928
- Delias ligata interpolata Roepke, 1955
- Delias ligata weylandensis Joicey & Talbot, 1922
- Delias luctuosa archboldi Roepke, 1955
- Delias luctuosa gottsi Gerrits & Van Mastrigt, [1993]
- Delias luctuosa magoda Gerrits & Yagishita, 2000
- Delias lytaea lytaea (Godman & Salvin, 1878)
- Delias madetes honrathi (von Mitis, 1893)
- Delias madetes madetes (Godman & Salvin, 1878)
- Delias madetes neohannoverana Rothschild, 1915
- Delias marguerita Joicey & Talbot, 1922
- Delias mariae Joicey & Talbot, 1916
- Delias maudei Joicey & Noakes, 1915
- Delias mavroneria flavidior Rothschild, 1915
- Delias mavroneria mavroneria Fruhstorfer, 1914
- Delias menooensis boschmai Roepke, 1955
- Delias menooensis menooensis Joicey & Talbot, 1922
- Delias mesoblema Jordan, [1912]
- Delias messalina lizzae Muller, 1999
- Delias messalina messalina Arora, 1983
- Delias messalina vigasa Parsons, 1989
- Delias microsticha flavopicta Jordan, [1912]
- Delias microsticha microsticha Rothschild, 1904
- Delias microsticha serratula Toxopeus, 1955
- Delias microsticha weja Van Mastrigt, 2006
- Delias muliensis Morinaka, Van Mastrigt & Sinabati, 1991
- Delias mysis goodenovii Rothschild, 1915
- Delias mysis maga (Grose-Smith, 1897)
- Delias mysis nemea Fruhstorfer, 1910
- Delias mysis rosseliana Rothschild, 1915
- Delias nais denigrata Joicey & Talbot, 1927
- Delias nais holophaea Roepke, 1955
- Delias nais maruyamai Yagishita, 1993
- Delias nais nais Jordan, [1912]
- Delias nais odilae Gotts & Ginn, 2004
- Delias nais rubrina Van Eecke, 1915
- Delias nakanokeikoae jali Van Mastrigt, 1996
- Delias nakanokeikoae nakanokeikoae Yagashita, 1993
- Delias narses Heller, 1896
- Delias neagra albimarginata Talbot, 1929
- Delias neagra hypochrysis Roepke, 1955
- Delias neagra neagra Jordan, [1912]
- Delias neeltje Gerrits & Van Mastrigt, [1993]
- Delias niepelti Ribbe, 1900
- Delias nieuwenhuisi poponga Van Mastrigt, 1990
- Delias nigropunctata Jordan & Noakes, 1915
- Delias oktanglap nishiyamai Yagishita, 1993
- Delias oktanglap oktanglap Van Mastrigt, 1990
- Delias ormoensis Van Mastrigt, 2006
- Delias ornytion ornytion (Godman & Salvin, 1881)
- Delias ornytion persephone Staudinger, 1895
- Delias parennia Roepke, 1955
- Delias pheres approximata Joicey & Talbot, 1922
- Delias pheres pheres Jordan, [1912]
- Delias phippsi mulia Gerrits & Van Mastrigt, [1993]
- Delias phippsi phippsi Joicey & Talbot, 1922
- Delias phippsi wisseli Roepke, 1955
- Delias pratti Kenrick, 1909
- Delias pseudomarguerita Gerrits & Van Mastrigt, [1993]
- Delias pulla nimivinye Van Mastrigt, 2001
- Delias pulla pulla Talbot, 1937
- Delias raymondi ogawai Morita, 1996
- Delias raymondi raymondi Schröder & Treadaway, 1982
- Delias raymondi shirahatai Morita, 1996
- Delias rileyi nishizawai Van Mastrigt & Sibatani, 1991
- Delias rileyi rileyi Joicey & Talbot, 1922
- Delias rileyi yofona Schröder & Treadaway, 1982
- Delias roepkei cieko Arima, 1996
- Delias rosamontana osadai Yagishita, 1993
- Delias rosamontana rosamontana Roepke, 1955
- Delias rosamontana tanakaorum Morita, 1996
- Delias rosamontana timur Van Mastrigt, 2003
- Delias sagessa anjae Schröder, 1977
- Delias salvini Butler, 1882
- Delias schoenbergi schoenbergi Rothschild, 1895
- Delias shunichii Morita, 1996
- Delias sigit Van Mastrigt, 1990
- Delias sinak Van Mastrigt, 1990
- Delias sphenodiscus Roepke, 1955
- Delias strix Yagishita, 1993
- Delias subapicalis sibatanii Van Mastrigt, 2003
- Delias takashii Sakuma, 1999
- Delias talboti Joicey & Noakes, 1915
- Delias telefominensis ayamiae Sakuma, 1996
- Delias telefominensis telefominensis Yagishita, 1993
- Delias tessei conspectirubra Joicey & Talbot, 1922
- Delias tessei tessei Joicey & Talbot, 1916
- Delias thompsoni Joicey & Talbot, 1916
- Delias totila Heller, 1896
- Delias toxopei morosa Roepke, 1955
- Delias toxopei nipsan Van Mastrigt, 1996
- Delias toxopei toxopei Roepke, 1955
- Delias toxopei uranoi Yagishita, 1993
- Delias virgo Gerrits & Van Mastrigt, [1993]
- Delias walshae ilu Van Mastrigt, 2000
- Delias walshae sanaeae Sakuma, 1999
- Delias walshae walshae Roepke, 1955
- Delias wollastoni abmisibilensis Van Mastrigt, 1990
- Delias wollastoni bryophila Roepke, 1955
- Delias wollastoni wollastoni Rothschild, 1915
- Delias zebra takanamii Yagishita, 1993
- Delias zebra zebra Roepke, 1955
- Elodina andropis hydatis Fruhstorfer, 1910
- Elodina andropis namatia Fruhstorfer, 1910
- Elodina argypheus Grose-Smith, 1890
- Elodina biaka Joicey & Noakes, 1915
- Elodina definita Joicey & Talbot, 1916
- Elodina hypatia hypatia C & R Felder, 1865
- Elodina primularis citrinaris (Butler, 1882)
- Elodina primularis primularis Butler, 1882
- Elodina umbratica Grose-Smith, 1889
- Leuciacria acuta Rothschild & Jordan 1905
- Leuciacria olivei Muller, 1999
- Pareronia jobaea (Boisduval, 1832)
- Pareronia chinki Joicey & Noakes, 1915
- Saletara cycinna corinna (Wallace, 1867)
- Saletara liberia (Cramer, 1779)

== Riodinidae ==
- Dicallaneura albosignata Joicey & Talbot, 1916
- Dicallaneura amabilis Rothschild, 1904
- Dicallaneura decorata (Hewitson, 1862)
- Dicallaneura dilectissima Toxopeus, 1944
- Dicallaneura ekeikei Bethune-Baker, 1904
- Dicallaneura exiguus Joicey, Noakes & Talbot, 1916
- Dicallaneura fulvofasciata Joicey, Noakes & Talbot, 1916
- Dicallaneura hyacinthus Toxopeus, 1944
- Dicallaneura kirschi Röber, 1886
- Dicallaneura leucomelas Rothschild & Jordan, 1905
- Dicallaneura pelidna Jordan, 1937
- Dicallaneura princessa Grose-Smith, 1894
- Dicallaneura pulchra (Guérin-Meneville, 1831)
- Dicallaneura ribbei Röber, 1886
- Dicallaneura virgo Joicey & Talbot, 1916
- Praetaxila albiplaga (Röber, 1886)
- Praetaxila heterisa (Jordan, 1912)
- Praetaxila huntei (Sharpe, 1903)
- Praetaxila poultoni Joicey & Talbot, 1922
- Praetaxila satraps (Grose-Smith, 1894)
- Praetaxila segecia (Hewitson, 1860)
- Praetaxila statira (Hewitson, 1862)
- Praetaxila tessei Joicey, Noakes & Talbot, 1916
- Praetaxila tyrannus (Grose-Smith & Kirby, 1897)
- Praetaxila wallacei (Hewitson, 1862)
- Praetaxila weiskei (Rothschild, 1901)

== Lycaenidae ==
=== Curetinae ===
- Curetis barsine fergussoni (Chapman, 1915)
- Curetis barsine menestratus Fruhstorfer, 1908
- Curetis barsine solita (Butler, 1882)

=== Miletinae ===
- Liphyra brassolis bougainvilleanus Samson & Smart, 1980
- Liphyra brassolis lugens Niepelt, 1921
- Liphyra brassolis robusta Felder & Felder, 1865
- Liphyra grandis Weymer, 1902
- Logania hampsoni Fruhstorfer, 1914
- Logania nehalemia Fruhstorfer, 1914
- Miletus boisduvali boisduvali Moore, 1857
- Miletus leos aronicus Fruhstorfer, 1914
- Spalgis asmus Parsons, 1986
- Spalgis epius (Westwood, 1851)

=== Theclinae ===
- Acupicta meeki Eliot, 1974
- Amblypodia annetta faisina (Ribbe, 1899)]
- Arhopala adherbal Grose-Smith, 1902
- Arhopala admete eucolpis (Kirsch, 1877)
- Arhopala admete sudesta Evans, 1957
- Arhopala aexone (Hewitson, 1863)
- Arhopala alkisthenes Fruhstorfer, 1914
- Arhopala ander Evans, 1957
- Arhopala antharita Grose-Smith, 1894
- Arhopala arta Evans, 1957
- Arhopala aruana Evans, 1957
- Arhopala asma Evans, 1957
- Arhopala auxesia (Hewitson, 1863)
- Arhopala axina Evans, 1957
- Arhopala axiothea (Hewitson, 1863)
- Arhopala azenia (Hewitson, 1863)
- Arhopala chamaeleona Bethune-Baker, 1903
- Arhopala cleander (C. Felder, 1860)
- Arhopala critala (C. Felder, 1860)
- Arhopala doreena Parsons, 1986
- Arhopala eupolis (Miskin, 1890)
- Arhopala eurisus eurisus Druce, 1891
- Arhopala florinda florinda (Grose-Smith, 1896)
- Arhopala florinda pagenstecheri (Ribbe, 1899)
- Arhopala fulla (Hewitson, 1862)
- Arhopala helianthes Grose-Smith, 1902
- Arhopala herculina Staudinger, 1888
- Arhopala hylander Grose-Smith, 1894
- Arhopala irma Fruhstorfer, 1914
- Arhopala kiriwinii Bethune-Baker, 1903
- Arhopala leander (Evans, 1957)
- Arhopala leo Druce, 1894
- Arhopala madytus (Fruhstorfer, 1914)
- Arhopala meander Boisduval, 1832
- Arhopala micale cidona (Fruhstorfer, 1914)
- Arhopala micale micale Blanchard, 1848
- Arhopala micale riuna Evans, 1957
- Arhopala nobilis C Felder, 1860
- Arhopala pagenstecheri (Ribbe, 1899)
- Arhopala philander eichhorni Evans, 1957
- Arhopala philander gander Evans, 1957
- Arhopala philander gazella (Fruhstorfer, 1914)
- Arhopala philander meeki Evans, 1957
- Arhopala sophilus Fruhstorfer, 1914
- Arhopala sophrosyne (Grose-Smith, 1889)
- Arhopala styx Fruhstorfer, 1914
- Arhopala thamyras minnetta (Butler, 1882)
- Arhopala thamyras phryxus (Boisduval, 1832)
- Arhopala tindali (Ribbe, 1899)
- Arhopala tyrannus C. & R. Felder, 1865
- Arhopala wanda Evans, 1957
- Arhopala wildei |Arhopala wildei soda Evans, 1957
- Artipe grandis (Rothschild & Jordan, 1905)
- Artipe dohertyi (Oberthür, 1894)
- Bindahara meeki kolmaui Muller & Sands, 1999
- Bindahara phocides isabella (C Felder, 1860)
- Deudorix affinis (Rothschild, 1915)
- Deudorix confusa Tennent, 2000
- Deudorix democles (Miskin, 1884)
- Deudorix diovis Hewitson, 1863
- Deudorix emira Tennent, 2000
- Deudorix epijarbas concolor (Joicey & Talbot, 1917)
- Deudorix epirus kallias Fruhstorfer, 1908
- Deudorix littoralis Joicey & Talbot, 1916
- Deudorix maudei Joicey & Talbot, 1916
- Deudorix mulleri Tennent, 2000
- Deudorix niepelti (Joicey & Talbot, 1922)
- Deudorix toxopeusi Tennent, Müller & Rawlins, 2010
- Deudorix woodfordi neopommerana Ribbe, 1899
- Deudorix woodfordi woodfordi Druce, 1891
- Horaga syrinx (C. Felder, 1860)
- Hypochlorosis ancharia (Hewitson, 1869)
- Hypochlorosis antipha metilia (Fruhstorfer, 1908)
- Hypochrysops alyattes alyattes Druce, 1891
- Hypochrysops alyattes aristocles (Grose-Smith, 1898)
- Hypochrysops antiphon Grose-Smith, 1897
- Hypochrysops apelles praeclarus (Fruhstorfer, 1908)
- Hypochrysops apollo wendisi (Bethune-Baker, 1909)
- Hypochrysops architas architas Druce, 1891
- Hypochrysops argyriorufa van Eecke, 1924
- Hypochrysops aristobul (Fruhstorfer, 1908)
- Hypochrysops arronica honora (Grose-Smith, 1898)
- Hypochrysops bakeri (Joicey & Talbot, 1916)
- Hypochrysops calliphon Grose-Smith, 1894
- Hypochrysops castaneus Sands, 1986
- Hypochrysops chrysargyrus Grose-Smith & Kirby, 1895
- Hypochrysops cleon Grose-Smith, 1900
- Hypochrysops cleonides Grose-Smith, 1900
- Hypochrysops coruscans (Grose-Smith, 1897)
- Hypochrysops dicomas Hewitson, 1874
- Hypochrysops digglesi (Hewitson, 1874)
- Hypochrysops dinawa (Bethune-Baker, 1908)
- Hypochrysops dohertyi Oberthür, 1894
- Hypochrysops elgneri (Waterhouse & Lyell, 1909)
- Hypochrysops felderi Oberthür, 1894
- Hypochrysops ferruguineus Sands, 1986
- Hypochrysops geminatus Sands, 1986
- Hypochrysops hermogenes Grose-Smith, 1894
- Hypochrysops heros Grose-Smith, 1894
- Hypochrysops hippuris Hewitson, 1874
- Hypochrysops ignitus (Leach, 1814)
- Hypochrysops luteus Sands, 1986
- Hypochrysops meeki Rothschild & Jordan, 1905
- Hypochrysops mioswara Bethune-Baker, 1913
- Hypochrysops miskini (Waterhouse, 1903)
- Hypochrysops narcissus (Fabricius, 1775)
- Hypochrysops plotinus Grose-Smith, 1894
- Hypochrysops polycletus brunnea (Druce, 1902)
- Hypochrysops polycletus kaystrus (Fruhstorfer, 1908)
- Hypochrysops protogenes C. & R. Felder, 1865
- Hypochrysops pythias aurifer (Grose-Smith, 1898)
- Hypochrysops ribbei (Röber, 1886)
- Hypochrysops rufimargo (Rothschild, 1915)
- Hypochrysops scintillans carolina D'Abrera, 1971
- Hypochrysops scintillans carveri D'Abrera, 1971
- Hypochrysops scintillans mirabilis (Pagenstecher, 1894)
- Hypochrysops scintillans scintillans (Butler, 1882)
- Hypochrysops scintillans squalliensis D'Abrera, 1971
- Hypochrysops siren Grose-Smith, 1894
- Hypochrysops theon C. & R. Felder, 1865
- Hypochrysops thesaurus Grose-Smith, 1894
- Hypolycaena alcestis (Grose-Smith, 1889)
- Hypolycaena danis derpiha (Hewitson, 1878)
- Hypolycaena danis milo (Grose-Smith, 1896)
- Hypolycaena dictaea C & R Felder, 1865
- Hypolycaena erylus (Godart, 1824)
- Hypolycaena periphorbas Butler, 1882
- Hypolycaena phorbas silo Fruhstorfer, 1912
- Hypolycaena sipylus (C. Felder, 1860)
- Melanolycaena altimontana Sibatani, 1974
- Melanolycaena thecloides Sibatani, 1974
- Ogyris meeki Rothschild, 1900
- Ogyris zosine Hewitson, 1853
- Philiris agatha (Grose-Smith, 1899)
- Philiris albicostalis Tite, 1963
- Philiris albihumerata Tite, 1963
- Philiris albiplaga (Joicey & Talbot, 1916)
- Philiris amethysta Sands, 1981
- Philiris angabunga (Bethune-Baker, 1908)
- Philiris apicalis apicalis Tite, 1963
- Philiris apicalis ginni Muller, 2002
- Philiris aquamarina Sands, 1981
- Philiris argentea (Rothschild, 1916)
- Philiris azula Wind & Clench, 1947
- Philiris baiteta Müller, 2014
- Philiris bicolor (Bethune-Baker, 1904)
- Philiris biplaga Sands, 1981
- Philiris bubalisatina Müller, 2014
- Philiris cadmica Sands, 1981
- Philiris caelestis Sands, 1979
- Philiris diana Waterhouse & Lyell, 1914
- Philiris dinawa (Bethune-Baker, 1908)
- Philiris doreia Tite, 1963
- Philiris elegans Tite, 1963
- Philiris fulgens (Grose-Smith & Kirby, 1897)
- Philiris gloriosa (Bethune-Baker, 1908)
- Philiris harteri (Grose-Smith, 1894)
- Philiris helena helena (Snellen, 1887)
- Philiris helena speirion (Druce, 1897)
- Philiris hemileuca (Jordan, 1930)
- Philiris hindenburgensis Müller, 2014
- Philiris hypoxantha (Röber, 1926)
- Philiris ianthina Tite, 1963
- Philiris ignobilis (Joicey & Talbot, 1916)
- Philiris innotata (Miskin, 1874)
- Philiris intensa birou Wind & Clench, 1947
- Philiris intensa regina (Butler, 1882)
- Philiris kapaura Tite, 1963
- Philiris kumusiensis Tite, 1963
- Philiris lavendula Tite, 1963
- Philiris lucescens lak Muller, 2002
- Philiris lucescens lucescens Tite, 1963
- Philiris maculata Sands, 1981
- Philiris marginata (Grose-Smith, 1894)
- Philiris mayri Wind & Clench, 1947
- Philiris melanacra Tite, 1963
- Philiris misimensis Wind & Clench, 1947
- Philiris moira moira (Grose-Smith, 1899)
- Philiris moira riuensis (Tite, 1963)
- Philiris montigena Tite, 1963
- Philiris nitens (Grose-Smith, 1898)
- Philiris oreas Tite, 1963
- Philiris pagwi Sands, 1981
- Philiris parsonsi Müller, 2014
- Philiris petriei Müller, 2014
- Philiris phengotes Tite, 1963
- Philiris philotoides Tite, 1963
- Philiris praeclara Tite, 1963
- Philiris putih Wind & Clench, 1947
- Philiris radicala Müller, 2014
- Philiris refusa (Grose-Smith, 1894)
- Philiris remissa Tite, 1963
- Philiris satis Tite, 1963
- Philiris scintillata Sands, 1981
- Philiris siassi krima Muller, 2002
- Philiris siassi siassi Sands, 1979
- Philiris sibatanii Sands, 1979
- Philiris subovata (Grose-Smith, 1894)
- Philiris tapini Sands, 1979
- Philiris tombara Tite, 1963
- Philiris unipunctata (Betune-Baker, 1908)
- Philiris vicina (Grose-Smith, 1898)
- Philiris violetta (Röber, 1926)
- Philiris zadne (Grose-Smith, 1898)
- Philiris ziska (Grose-Smith, 1898)
- Pseudodipsas eone iovis Fruhstorfer, 1923
- Pseudodipsas mulleri Tennent, 2004
- Pseudodipsas una (D'Abrera, 1971)
- Rapala varuna simsoni (Miskin, 1874)
- Titea caerulea (Tite, 1963)
- Titea sublutea (Bethune-Baker, 1906)
- Virachola democles (Miskin, 1884)

=== Polyommatinae ===
- Anthene licatus Hewitson, 1874
- Anthene lycaenoides orientalis Tennent, 2001
- Anthene lycaenoides sutrana (Fruhstorfer, 1916)
- Anthene paraffinis emoloides Tite, 1966
- Anthene paraffinis matthias Tite, 1966
- Anthene paraffinis nissani Tite, 1966
- Anthene paraffinis paraffinis (Fruhstorfer, 1916)
- Anthene seltuttus seltuttus (Röber, 1886)
- Anthene seltuttus violacea (Butler, 1899)
- Caleta mindarus vocetius Fruhstorfer, 1918
- Callictita albiplaga Joicey & Talbot, 1916
- Callictita arfakiana Wind & Clench, 1947
- Callictita cyara Bethune-Baker, 1908
- Callictita felgara Parsons, 1986
- Callictita jola Parsons, 1986
- Callictita lara Parsons, 1986
- Callictita mala Parsons, 1986
- Callictita tifala Parsons, 1986
- Callictita upola Parsons & Hirowatari, 1986
- Candalides afretta Parsons, 1986
- Candalides ardosiacea (Tite, 1963)
- Candalides coeruleus (Röber, 1886)
- Candalides cupreus (Röber, 1886)
- Candalides erinus sudesta Tite, 1963
- Candalides grandissima Bethune-Baker, 1906
- Candalides helenita (Semper, 1879)
- Candalides lamia (Grose-Smith, 1897)
- Candalides limbata (Tite, 1963)
- Candalides margarita (Semper, 1879)
- Candalides meforensis (Tite, 1963)
- Candalides neurapacuna Bethune-Baker, 1908
- Candalides parsonsi Tennent, 2005
- Candalides pruina Druce, 1904
- Candalides riuensis (Tite, 1963)
- Candalides silicea (Grose-Smith, 1894)
- Candalides tringa (Grose-Smith, 1894)
- Candalides viriditincta (Tite, 1963)
- Catochrysops amasea amasea Waterhouse & Lyell, 1914
- Catochrysops nubila Tite, 1959
- Catochrysops panormus pura Tite, 1959
- Catochrysops strabo celebensis Tite, 1959
- Catopyrops ancyra amaura (Druce, 1891)
- Catopyrops ancyra complicata (Butler, 1882)
- Catopyrops ancyra distincta Tite, 1963
- Catopyrops ancyra mysia (Waterhouse & Lyell, 1914)
- Catopyrops ancyra procella Tite, 1963
- Catopyrops holtra Parsons, 1986
- Catopyrops keiria keiria (Druce, 1891)
- Catopyrops kokopona (Ribbe, 1899)
- Catopyrops zyx Parsons, 1986
- Celastrina acesina (Bethune-Baker, 1906)
- Celastrina lavendularis (Moore, 1877)
- Celastrina philippina nedda (Grose-Smith, 1894)
- Danis concolor (Rothschild, 1916)
- Danis danis dispar (Grose-Smith & Kirby, 1895)
- Danis danis lampros (Druce, 1897)
- Danis danis latifascia (Rothschild, 1915)
- Danis danis regina (Kirby, 1889)
- Danis danis suleima (Grose-Smith, 1898)
- Danis danis zuleika (Grose-Smith, 1898)
- Danis drucei (Grose-Smith & Kirby, 1895)
- Danis glaucopis (Grose-Smith, 1894)
- Danis hengis (Grose-Smith, 1897)
- Danis melimnos (Druce & Bethune-Baker, 1893)
- Danis metrophanes (Fruhstorfer, 1915)
- Danis phroso (Grose-Smith, 1897)
- Danis regalis Grose-Smith & Kirby, 1895
- Danis wallacei (C. & R. Felder, 1865)
- Discolampa albula (Grose-Smith, 1897)
- Epimastidia arienis arienis Druce, 1891
- Epimastidia arienis bornemanni (Pagenstecher, 1894)
- Epimastidia inops pilumna (Druce, 1894)
- Epimastidia yiwikana Schröder, 2010
- Erysichton albiplaga Tite, 1963
- Erysichton lineata insularis Tite, 1963
- Erysichton lineata meiranganus (Röber, 1886)
- Erysichton lineata uluensis (Ribbe, 1899)
- Erysichton lineata vincula (Druce, 1891)
- Erysichton palmyra clara Tite, 1963
- Erysichton palmyra coelia (Grose-Smith, 1894)
- Erysichton palmyra lateplaga Tite, 1963
- Euchrysops cnejus cnidus Waterhouse and Lyell, 1914
- Everes lacturnus palliensis (Ribbe, 1899)
- Everes lacturnus pulchra (Rothschild, 1915)
- Famegana alsulus Herrich-Schäffer, 1869
- Freyeria trochylus (Freyer, 1844)
- Ionolyce brunnescens brunnescens Tite, 1963
- Ionolyce helicon caracalla (Waterhouse & Lyell, 1914)
- Ionolyce selkon Parsons, 1986
- Jamides aetherialis caerulina (Mathew, 1887)
- Jamides aleuas (C. & R. Felder, 1865)
- Jamides allectus sarmice (Fruhstorfer, 1915)
- Jamides amarauge amarauge Druce, 1891
- Jamides aruensis (Pagenstecher, 1884)
- Jamides bochus (Stoll, 1782)
- Jamides celeno sundara (Fruhstorfer, 1915)
- Jamides cephion Druce, 1891
- Jamides coritus pseudeuchylas (Strand, 1911)
- Jamides cyta amphissina (Grose-Smith, 1894)
- Jamides nemophila albipatulus Tite, 1960
- Jamides nemophila nemophila (Butler, 1876)
- Jamides nemophila paralectus (Grose-Smith & Kirby, 1897)
- Jamides nitens (Joicey & Talbot, 1916)
- Jamides philatus Snellen, 1878
- Jamides pseudosias coeligena (Joicey & Talbot, 1916)
- Jamides reverdini (Fruhstorfer, 1915)
- Jamides soemias purpurata (Grose-Smith, 1894)
- Jamides soemias soemias Druce, 1891
- Lampides boeticus (Linnaeus, 1767)
- Leptotes plinius pseudocassius (Murray, 1873)
- Luthrodes cleotas cleotas (Guérin-Méneville, 1831)
- Luthrodes cleotas gades (Fruhstorfer, 1915)
- Lycaenopsis haraldus (Fabricius, 1787)
- Megisba strongyle caudata (Eliot & Kawazoé, 1983)
- Megisba strongyle clerica (Fruhstorfer, 1918)
- Megisba strongyle monacha (Grose-Smith, 1894)
- Monodontides argioloides (Rothschild, 1916)
- Nacaduba berenice apira Fruhstorfer, 1916
- Nacaduba berenice korene (Druce, 1891)
- Nacaduba cajetani Tite, 1963
- Nacaduba calauria (C. & R. Felder, 1860)
- Nacaduba cyanea chromia (Druce, 1891)
- Nacaduba cyanea epicoritus (Boisduval, 1832)
- Nacaduba cyanea hamilcar (Grose-Smith, 1894)
- Nacaduba cyanea rosselana (Bethune-Baker, 1908)
- Nacaduba hermus (C. Felder, 1860)
- Nacaduba kurava cyaneira (Fruhstorfer, 1916)
- Nacaduba kurava ariitea (Fruhstorfer, 1916)
- Nacaduba kurava lydia (Fruhstorfer, 1916)
- Nacaduba kurava pacifica Toxopeus, 1927
- Nacaduba kurava rothschildi Toxopeus, 1927
- Nacaduba lucana Tite, 1963
- Nacaduba major (Rothschild, 1915)
- Nacaduba mallicollo markira Tite, 1963
- Nacaduba mioswara Tite, 1963
- Nacaduba nerine (Grose-Smith & Kirby, 1899)
- Nacaduba novaehebridensis vulcana Tite, 1963
- Nacaduba pactolus antalcidas Fruhstorfer, 1915
- Nacaduba pactolus bilikii Tennent, 2000
- Nacaduba pactolus raluana Ribbe, 1899
- Nacaduba ruficirca Tite, 1963
- Nacaduba schneideri (Ribbe, 1899)
- Nacaduba subperusia martha Eliot, 1955
- Nacaduba subperusia uniformis (Rothschild, 1915)
- Nacaduba tristis Rothschild, 1915
- Nacaduba vulcana Tite, 1963
- Nacaduba zaron Muller, 2002
- Neopithecops lucifer heria (Fruhstorfer, 1919)
- Nothodanis schaeffera caesius (Grose-Smith, 1894)
- Nothodanis schaeffera cepheis (Druce, 1891)
- Nothodanis schaeffera esme (Grose-Smith, 1894)
- Paraduba metriodes (Bethune-Baker, 1911)
- Paraduba owgarra Bethune-Baker, 1906
- Parelodina aroa Bethune-Baker, 1904
- Perpheres perpheres (Druce & Bethune-Baker, 1893)
- Petrelaea tombugensis (Röber, 1886)
- Pistoria nigropunctata (Bethune-Baker, 1908)
- Pithecops dionisius dionisius (Boisduval, 1832)
- Pithecops dionisius staphylus Fruhstorfer, 1919
- Prosotas atra Tite, 1963
- Prosotas dubiosa dubiosa (Semper, 1879)
- Prosotas dubiosa eborata Tite, 1963
- Prosotas gracilis saturatior (Rothschild, 1915)
- Prosotas nora caliginosa (Druce, 1891)
- Prosotas nora nora (C Felder, 1860)
- Prosotas papuana Tite, 1963
- Prosotas russelli Tennent, 2003
- Prosotas talesea Tite, 1963
- Psychonotis brownii (Druce & Bethune-Baker, 1893)
- Psychonotis caelius hanno (Grose-Smith, 1894)
- Psychonotis caelius manusi (Rothschild, 1915)
- Psychonotis caelius mayae (D'Abrera, 1971)
- Psychonotis caelius plotinus (Grose-Smith & Kirby, 1896)
- Psychonotis hebes (Druce, 1904)
- Psychonotis kruera (Druce, 1891)
- Psychonotis melanae (Joicey & Talbot, 1916)
- Psychonotis parsonsi Muller, 2003
- Sahulana scintillata (Lucas, 1889)
- Tartesa astarte albescens (Tite, 1960)
- Tartesa astarte astarte (Butler, 1882)
- Tartesa astarte nissani (Tite, 1960)
- Thaumaina uranothauma Bethune-Baker, 1908
- Theclinesthes miskini arnoldi (Fruhstorfer, 1916)
- Theclinesthes miskini brandti Sibatani & Grund, 1978
- Udara antonia Eliot & Kawazoe, 1983
- Udara cardia cardia (C Felder, 1860)
- Udara cybele Eliot & Kawazoe, 1983
- Udara davenporti Parsons, 1986
- Udara dilecta (Moore, 1879)
- Udara drucei tennenti Muller, 2002
- Udara kodama Eliot & Kawazoe, 1983
- Udara laetitia Eliot & Kawazoe, 1983
- Udara manokwariensis (Joicey, Noakes & Talbot, 1916)
- Udara meeki (Bethune-Baker, 1906)
- Udara owgarra (Bethune-Baker, 1906)
- Udara pullus (Joicey & Talbot, 1916)
- Udara rona rona (Grose-Smith, 1894)
- Udara sibatanii Eliot & Kawazoe, 1983
- Upolampes evena (Hewitson, 1876)
- Zizeeria karsandra (Moore, 1865)
- Zizina labradus aruensis (Swinhoe, 1916)
- Zizina labradus lampra (Tite, 1969)
- Zizula hylax dampierensis (Rothschild, 1915)

== Nymphalidae ==
=== Libytheinae ===
- Libythea geoffroy maenia Fruhstorfer, 1909
- Libythea geoffroy orientalis (Godman & Salvin, 1888)
- Libythea geoffroy pulchra (Butler, 1882)
- Libythea narina hatami Kenrick, 1911

=== Danainae ===
- Danaus affinis affinis (Fabricius, 1775)
- Danaus affinis bipuncta (Talbot, 1943)
- Danaus affinis biseriata (Butler, 1882)
- Danaus affinis bonguensis Fruhstorfer, 1899
- Danaus affinis decipiens (Butler, 1882)
- Danaus affinis decipientis (Strand, 1914)
- Danaus affinis fergussonia (Fruhstorfer, 1907)
- Danaus affinis galacterion Fruhstorfer, 1906
- Danaus affinis jobiensis (Grose-Smith, 1894)
- Danaus affinis kiriwina (Fruhstorfer, 1907)
- Danaus affinis kobakma Van Mastrigt, 2009
- Danaus affinis mytilene (C. & R. Felder, 1860)
- Danaus affinis obscura (Capronnier, 1886)
- Danaus affinis pleistarchus (Fruhstorfer, 1912)
- Danaus affinis sabrona Talbot, 1943
- Danaus affinis strephon Fruhstorfer, 1906
- Danaus affinis subnigra (Joicey & Talbot, 1922)
- Danaus affinis woodlarkiana (Fruhstorfer, 1907)
- Danaus petilia (Stoll, 1790)
- Danaus plexippus plexippus (Linnaeus, 1758)
- Euploea albicosta Joicey & Noakes, 1915
- Euploea alcathoe macgregori (Kirby, 1889)
- Euploea alcathoe melinda Grose-Smith, 1894
- Euploea alcathoe occulta (Butler, 1877)
- Euploea alcathoe pierretii C. & R. Felder, 1865
- Euploea algea cissia Fruhstorfer, 1910
- Euploea algea irene (Fruhstorfer, 1910)
- Euploea algea lachrymosa Grose-Smith, 1894
- Euploea algea tenebrosa Grose-Smith, 1894
- Euploea algea violetta (Butler, 1876)
- Euploea asyllus asyllus Godman & Salvin, 1888
- Euploea batesii auritincta Carpenter, 1953
- Euploea batesii honesta (Butler, 1882)
- Euploea batesii mimica Fruhstorfer, 1910
- Euploea batesii pinaria Fruhstorfer, 1910
- Euploea batesii publilia Fruhstorfer, 1910
- Euploea batesii resarta (Butler, 1876)
- Euploea batesii rotunda van Eecke, 1915
- Euploea batesii trobriandensis Carpenter, 1953
- Euploea boisduvalii fraudulenta (Butler, 1882)
- Euploea charox illudens (Butler, 1882)
- Euploea charox mathiasana (Carpenter, 1942)
- Euploea charox subnobilis (Strand, 1914)
- Euploea climena nobilis (Strand, 1914)
- Euploea core charox Kirsch, 1877
- Euploea doretta (Pagenstecher, 1894)
- Euploea eboraci (Grose-Smith, 1894)
- Euploea eurianassa (Hewitson, 1858)
- Euploea lacon (Grose-Smith, 1894)
- Euploea leucostictos affinita (Strand, 1914)
- Euploea leucostictos eustachius (Kirby, 1889)
- Euploea leucostictos herbstii Boisduval, 1832
- Euploea leucostictos messia (Fruhstorfer, 1910)
- Euploea leucostictos oeneon (Fruhstorfer, 1912)
- Euploea leucostictos oppia Fruhstorfer, 1910
- Euploea leucostictos perdita (Butler, 1882)
- Euploea leucostictos polymela (Godman & Salvin, 1888)
- Euploea leucostictos pulchella (Carpenter, 1942)
- Euploea leucostictos staintonii C. & R. Felder, 1865
- Euploea leucostictos swierstrae Snellen, 1891
- Euploea modesta cerberus (Butler, 1882)
- Euploea modesta griseitincta (Carpenter, 1942)
- Euploea modesta incerta Joicey & Noakes, 1915
- Euploea modesta insulicola (Strand, 1914)
- Euploea modesta jennessi (Carpenter, 1941)
- Euploea modesta lugens Butler, 1876
- Euploea morosa lugubris (Grose-Smith, 1894)
- Euploea nechos nechos Mathew, 1887
- Euploea netscheri netscheri Snellen, 1889
- Euploea netscheri numantia Fruhstorfer, 1910
- Euploea phaenareta admiralia (Strand, 1914)
- Euploea phaenareta arova (Fruhstorfer, 1913)
- Euploea phaenareta callithoe (Boisduval, 1832)
- Euploea phaenareta eurykleia (Fruhstorfer, 1910)
- Euploea phaenareta heurippa (Godman & Salvin, 1888)
- Euploea phaenareta mesocala Vollenhoven, 1873
- Euploea phaenareta morna (Fruhstorfer, 1912)
- Euploea phaenareta sacerdotalis Fruhstorfer, 1910
- Euploea phaenareta unibrunnea (Salvin & Godman, 1877)
- Euploea stephensii bismarckiana (Fruhstorfer, 1900)
- Euploea stephensii flaminia Fruhstorfer, 1904
- Euploea stephensii garcila Fruhstorfer, 1910
- Euploea stephensii jamesi (Butler, 1876)
- Euploea stephensii kirschii Moore, 1883
- Euploea stephensii nivani Carpenter, 1953
- Euploea stephensii pumila Butler, 1866
- Euploea stephensii salabanda Kirsch, 1877
- Euploea stephensii sisamis Kirsch, 1877
- Euploea stephensii stephensii C. & R. Felder, [1865]
- Euploea sylvester doleschalii (C & R Felder, 1859)
- Euploea treitschkei aebutia Fruhstorfer, 1910
- Euploea treitschkei aenea (Butler, 1882)
- Euploea treitschkei coerulescens (Pagenstecher, 1894)
- Euploea treitschkei mattyensis Fruhstorfer, 1912
- Euploea treitschkei suffusca (Carpenter, 1953)
- Euploea treitschkei treitschkei Boisduval, 1832
- Euploea treitschkei ursula (Butler, 1883)
- Euploea treitschkei viridis (Butler, 1882)
- Euploea tripunctata Joicey & Noakes, 1915
- Euploea tulliolus doryca Butler, 1878
- Euploea tulliolus dudgeonis (Grose-Smith, 1894)
- Euploea tulliolus goodenoughi (Carpenter, 1942)
- Euploea tulliolus mangolinella (Strand, 1914)
- Euploea tulliolus nocturna Fruhstorfer, 1904
- Euploea tulliolus offaka Fruhstorfer, 1904
- Euploea usipetes rezia (Kirby, 1894)
- Euploea wallacei confusa Butler, 1866
- Euploea wallacei melia (Fruhstorfer, 1904)
- Idea durvillei durvillei Boisduval, 1832
- Idea durvillei hemera (Fruhstorfer, 1903)
- Idea durvillei metris (Fruhstorfer, 1903)
- Idea durvillei nike (Fruhstorfer, 1903)
- Ideopsis fojana Peggie, Vane-Wright & Van Mastrigt, 2009
- Ideopsis hewitsonii Kirsch, 1877
- Ideopsis juventa bosnika (Talbot, 1943)
- Ideopsis juventa catella (Fruhstorfer, 1912)
- Ideopsis juventa eugenia (Fruhstorfer, 1907)
- Ideopsis juventa hollandia (Talbot, 1943)
- Ideopsis juventa kolleri (Hulstaert, 1923)
- Ideopsis juventa purpurata (Butler, 1866)
- Ideopsis juventa sobrina (Boisduval, 1832)
- Ideopsis juventa sobrinoides (Butler, 1882)
- Ideopsis juventa tanais (Fruhstorfer, 1904)
- Ideopsis vitrea arfakensis Fruhstorfer, 1898
- Ideopsis vitrea inuncta (Butler, 1865)
- Ideopsis vitrea onina Talbot, 1940
- Ideopsis vitrea serena Joicey & Talbot, 1916
- Miriamica weiskei (Rothschild, 1901)
- Miriamica thalassina (Joicey & Noakes, 1916)
- Parantica clinias (Grose-Smith, 1890)
- Parantica fuscela berak Muller, 2002
- Parantica fuscela fuscela Parsons, 1989
- Parantica garamantis dilatata (Joicey & Talbot, 1925)
- Parantica kirbyi (Grose-Smith, 1894)
- Parantica melusine meeki (Grose-Smith, 1897)
- Parantica rotundata rookensis (Joicey & Talbot, 1925)
- Parantica rotundata rotundata (Grose-Smith, 1890)
- Parantica schenkii periphas (Fruhstorfer, 1910)
- Parantica schenkii schenkii (Koch, 1865)
- Protoploea apatela (Joicey & Talbot, 1925)
- Tellervo assarica macrofallax Strand, 1911
- Tellervo assarica jobinus Fruhstorfer, 1911
- Tellervo assarica limetanus Fruhstorfer, 1911
- Tellervo assarica mioswara Ackery, 1987
- Tellervo assarica mysolensis Joicey & Talbot, 1922
- Tellervo assarica salawatica Ackery, 1987
- Tellervo assarica strandi Ackery, 1987
- Tellervo assarica talboti Ackery, 1987
- Tellervo hiero hiero (Godman & Salvin, 1888)
- Tellervo jurriaansei Joicey & Talbot, 1922
- Tellervo nedusia biakensis Joicey& Noakes, 1916
- Tellervo nedusia coalescens Rothschild, 1915
- Tellervo nedusia fallax (Staudinger, 1885)
- Tellervo nedusia jobia Ackery, 1987
- Tellervo nedusia meforicus Fruhstorfer, 1910
- Tellervo nedusia mysoriensis (Staudinger, 1885)
- Tellervo nedusia nedusia (Geyer, 1832)
- Tellervo nedusia papuensis Ackery, 1987
- Tellervo nedusia talesea Ackery, 1987
- Tellervo nedusia wangaarica Ackery, 1987
- Tellervo nedusia wollastoni Rothschild, 1916
- Tellervo parvipuncta parvipuncta Joicey & Talbot, 1922
- Tellervo parvipuncta separata Ackery, 1987
- Tellervo zoilus aequicinctus (Salvin & Godman, 1877)
- Tellervo zoilus antipatrus Fruhstorfer, 1911
- Tellervo zoilus distincta Rothschild, 1915
- Tellervo zoilus digulica Hulstaert, 1924
- Tellervo zoilus duba Ackery, 1987
- Tellervo zoilus lavonga Ackery, 1987
- Tellervo zoilus misima Ackery, 1987
- Tellervo zoilus mujua Ackery, 1987
- Tellervo zoilus sarcapus Fruhstorfer, 1911
- Tellervo zoilus tagula Ackery, 1987
- Tirumala hamata coarctata (Joicey & Talbot, 1922)
- Tirumala hamata leucoptera (Butler, 1874)
- Tirumala hamata obscurata (Butler, 1874)
- Tirumala hamata pallidula (Talbot, 1943)
- Tirumala hamata subnubila (Talbot, 1943)

=== Morphinae ===
- Hyantis hodeva fuliginosa Grose-Smith, 1898
- Hyantis hodeva helvola Stichel, 1905
- Hyantis hodeva hodeva Hewitson, 1862
- Hyantis hodeva xanthophthalma Röber, 1903
- Morphopsis albertisi aigion Fruhstorfer, 1911
- Morphopsis albertisi albertisi Oberthür, 1880
- Morphopsis phippsi Joicey & Talbot, 1922
- Morphopsis biakensis Joicey & Talbot, 1916
- Morphopsis ula brunnifascia Joicey, Noakes & Talbot, 1916
- Taenaris artemis affinis (Kirby, 1889)
- Taenaris artemis artemis (Snellen, 1860)
- Taenaris artemis blandina Fruhstorfer, 1904
- Taenaris artemis celsa Fruhstorfer, 1904
- Taenaris artemis electra Fruhstorfer, 1904
- Taenaris artemis gisela Fruhstorfer, 1904
- Taenaris artemis humboldti Fruhstorfer, 1904
- Taenaris artemis madu Brooks, 1944
- Taenaris artemis melanops (Grose-Smith, 1897)
- Taenaris artemis tineutus Fruhstorfer, 1905
- Taenaris artemis zenada Fruhstorfer, 1904
- Taenaris artemis ziada Fruhstorfer, 1904
- Taenaris bioculatus albius Brooks, 1950
- Taenaris bioculatus avarea Fruhstorfer, 1916
- Taenaris bioculatus bioculatus (Guérin-Méneville, 1831)
- Taenaris bioculatus charon Staudinger, 1887
- Taenaris bioculatus grisescens Rothschild, 1915
- Taenaris catops adriana Fruhstorfer, 1904
- Taenaris catops fimbriata (Kirby, 1889)
- Taenaris catops fulvida Butler, 1870
- Taenaris catops galaecia Fruhstorfer, 1910
- Taenaris catops jathrippa Fruhstorfer, 1916
- Taenaris catops jobina Fruhstorfer, 1904
- Taenaris catops kajuna Fruhstorfer, 1904
- Taenaris catops laretta Fruhstorfer, 1904
- Taenaris catops mylaecha (Westwood, 1851)
- Taenaris catops pamphaga Kirsch, 1877
- Taenaris catops rosseliana Rothschild, 1916
- Taenaris catops selenides Staudinger, 1887
- Taenaris cyclops acontius Brooks, 1944
- Taenaris cyclops cyclops Staudinger, 1893
- Taenaris cyclops interfaunis Rothschild, 1916
- Taenaris cyclops misolensis Rothschild, 1916
- Taenaris cyclops occidentalis Rothschild, 1916
- Taenaris dimona anna Fruhstorfer, 1915
- Taenaris dimona didorus Brooks, 1944
- Taenaris dimona dimonata Stichel, 1906
- Taenaris dimona kapaura Fruhstorfer, 1904
- Taenaris dimona microps Grose-Smith, 1894
- Taenaris dimona offaka Fruhstorfer, 1905
- Taenaris dimona sorronga Fruhstorfer, 1905
- Taenaris dimona zaitha Fruhstorfer, 1915
- Taenaris dina insularis Rothschild, 1916
- Taenaris dina sordidior Rothschild, 1916
- Taenaris dioptrica amitaba Fruhstorfer, 1904
- Taenaris dioptrica dioptrica (Snellen, 1860)
- Taenaris dioptrica rileyi Hulstaert, 1925
- Taenaris gorgo danalis Fruhstorfer, 1904
- Taenaris gorgo gorgo (Kirsch, 1877)
- Taenaris gorgo gorgophone Fruhstorfer,1904
- Taenaris gorgo lucina Brooks, 1944
- Taenaris gorgo mera Fruhstorfer, 1905
- Taenaris honrathi honrathi Staudinger, 1886
- Taenaris honrathi ladas Brooks, 1950
- Taenaris honrathi ritsemae Fruhstorfer, 1904
- Taenaris honrathi sekarensis Staudinger, 1887
- Taenaris hyperbolus hyaeus Brooks, 1950
- Taenaris hyperbolus hyginus Brooks, 1950
- Taenaris hyperbolus hyperbolus (Kirsch, 1877)
- Taenaris hyperbolus versteegi Van Eecke, 1915
- Taenaris mailua convergens (Rothschild, 1916)
- Taenaris mailua rosseli Fruhstorfer, 1905
- Taenaris myops ansuna Fruhstorfer, 1904
- Taenaris myops fergussonia Westwood, 1851
- Taenaris myops kirschi (Staudinger, 1887)
- Taenaris myops merana Fruhstorfer, 1904
- Taenaris myops parallelus Rothschild, 1916
- Taenaris myops phrixus Brooks, 1950
- Taenaris myops praxedes Fruhstorfer, 1904
- Taenaris myops rothschildi Grose-Smith, 1894
- Taenaris myops vanhaasterti Hulstaert, 1925
- Taenaris onolaus onolaus (Kirsch, 1877)
- Taenaris onolaus shapur Brooks, 1944
- Taenaris phorcas admiralitatis Rothschild, 1916
- Taenaris phorcas phorcas (Westwood, 1856)
- Taenaris schoenbergi schoenbergi (Fruhstorfer, 1893)
- Taenaris schoenbergi vanheurni Bakker, 1942
- Taenaris scylla Staudinger, 1887

=== Satyrinae ===
- Altiapa colorata (Nishizawa & Sibatani, 1984)
- Altiapa decolor (Rothschild & Jordan, 1905)
- Altiapa klossi (Rothschild, 1916)
- Altiapa pandora goliathina (Jordan, 1924)
- Altiapa pandora pandora (Joicey & Talbot, 1916)
- Argyronympha pulchra Mathew, 1886
- Argyronympha rubianensis rubianensis Grose-Smith, 1889
- Elymnias agondas agondas (Boisduval, 1832)
- Elymnias agondas aruana Fruhstorfer, 1900
- Elymnias agondas bioculatus Hewitson, 1851
- Elymnias agondas melanippe (Grose-Smith, 1894)
- Elymnias agondas melantho Wallace, 1869
- Elymnias cybele holofernes (Butler, 1882)
- Elymnias cybele thryallis Kirsch, 1877
- Elymnias hypermnestra (Linnaeus, 1763)
- Elymnias papua bivitata van Eecke, 1915
- Elymnias papua cinereomargo Joicey & Noakes, 1915
- Elymnias papua kakarona Hagen, 1897
- Elymnias papua papua Wallace, 1869
- Elymnias papua viridescens Grose-Smith, 1894
- Elymnias paradoxa Staudinger, 1894
- Erycinidia maudei Joicey & Talbot, 1916
- Erycinidia virgo (Rothschild & Jordan, 1905)
- Harsiesis hecaerge (Hewitson, 1863)
- Harsiesis hygea hygea (Hewitson, 1863)
- Harsiesis hygea jobina Fruhstorfer, 1911
- Harsiesis yolanthe Fruhstorfer, 1913
- Hypocysta aroa calypso Grose-Smith, 1897
- Hypocysta haemonia fenestrella Fruhstorfer, 1911
- Hypocysta haemonia haemonia Hewitson, 1863
- Hypocysta haemonia pelusiota Fruhstorfer, 1911
- Hypocysta isis lepida Jordan, 1924
- Hypocysta isis pelagia Fruhstorfer, 1911
- Hypocysta osyris waigeuensis Joicey & Talbot, 1917
- Hypocysta serapis Grose-Smith, 1894
- Lamprolenis nitida Godman & Salvin, 1880
- Melanitis amabilis amabilis (Boisduval, 1832)
- Melanitis amabilis valentina Fruhstorfer, 1908
- Melanitis constantia constantia (Cramer, 1777)
- Melanitis constantia despoliata Fruhstorfer, 1908
- Melanitis leda bouruana Holland, 1900
- Melanitis leda salomonis Fruhstorfer, 1908
- Mycalesis aethiops Butler, 1868
- Mycalesis asophis Hewitson, 1862
- Mycalesis barbara fulvooculatus Joicey, Noakes & Talbot, 1916
- Mycalesis barbara pallida Joicey & Talbot, 1916
- Mycalesis bazochii (Guérin-Méneville, 1831)
- Mycalesis biformis Rothschild, 1916
- Mycalesis bilineata Fruhstorfer, 1906
- Mycalesis cacodaemon bizonata Grose-Smith, 1902
- Mycalesis cacodaemon cacodaemon Kirsch, 1877
- Mycalesis comes Grose-Smith, 1894
- Mycalesis discobolus Fruhstorfer, 1906
- Mycalesis drusillodes (Oberthür, 1894)
- Mycalesis duponchelii duponchelii (Guérin-Méneville, 1831)
- Mycalesis duponchelii eminens Staudinger, 1893
- Mycalesis duponchelii eudoxia Fruhstorfer, 1906
- Mycalesis duponchelii kapaura Fruhstorfer, 1906
- Mycalesis duponchelii maforica Fruhstorfer, 1906
- Mycalesis duponchelii roonia Fruhstorfer, 1906
- Mycalesis duponchelii umbonia Fruhstorfer, 1906
- Mycalesis durga durga Grose-Smith & Kirby, 1894
- Mycalesis durga jobina Fruhstorfer, 1906
- Mycalesis eliasis Grose-Smith, 1894
- Mycalesis fulvianetta fulvianetta Rothschild, 1916
- Mycalesis fulvianetta semicastanea Joicey & Talbot, 1916
- Mycalesis giamana Parsons, 1986
- Mycalesis mehadeva fulviana Grose-Smith, 1894
- Mycalesis mehadeva mehadeva (Boisduval, 1832)
- Mycalesis mucia etha Fruhstorfer, 1908
- Mycalesis mucia febronia Fruhstorfer, 1911
- Mycalesis mucia mucia Hewitson, 1862
- Mycalesis mulleri Tennent, 2000
- Mycalesis perseus lalassis (Hewitson, 1864)
- Mycalesis perseus perseus (Fabricius, 1775)
- Mycalesis phidon phidon Hewitson, 1862
- Mycalesis phidon phidonides Fruhstorfer, 1908
- Mycalesis phidon xanthias (Grose-Smith, 1896)
- Mycalesis shiva maura (Grose-Smith, 1894)
- Mycalesis shiva shiva (Boisduval, 1832)
- Mycalesis sirius sirius (Fabricius, 1775)
- Mycalesis splendens versicolor Tennent, 2002
- Mycalesis terminus atropates Fruhstorfer, 1908
- Mycalesis terminus flagrans (Butler, 1876)
- Mycalesis terminus matho (Grose-Smith, 1894)
- Mycalesis terminus terminulus Fruhstorfer, 1908
- Mycalesis valeria helena D'Abrera, 1971
- Orsotriaena medus licium Fruhstorfer, 1908
- Platypthima dispar dispar Joicey & Talbot, 1922
- Platypthima homochroa satisbona Jordan, 1924
- Platypthima placiva Jordan, 1924
- Ypthima arctoa subarctua Tryon, 1890

=== Charaxinae ===
- Charaxes latona cimonides Grose-Smith, 1894
- Charaxes latona diana Rothschild, 1898
- Charaxes latona discipicta Strand, 1914
- Charaxes latona layardi (Butler, 1896)
- Charaxes latona leto Rothschild, 1898
- Charaxes latona papuensis Butler, 1869
- Polyura epigenes monochromus (Niepelt, 1914)
- Polyura jupiter admiralitatis (Rothschild, 1915)
- Polyura jupiter attila (Grose-Smith, 1889)
- Polyura jupiter jupiter (Butler, 1869)
- Prothoe australis australis (Guérin-Méneville, 1831)
- Prothoe australis hewitsoni (Wallace, 1869)
- Prothoe australis satgeii Joicey & Noakes, 1915
- Prothoe australis schulzi (Ribbe, 1898)
- Prothoe australis westwoodi Wallace, 1869
- Prothoe layardi (Godman & Salvin, 1882)
- Prothoe ribbei Rothschild, 1895

=== Apaturinae ===
- Apaturina erminea neopommerania Hagen, 1897
- Apaturina erminea octavia Fruhstorfer, 1904
- Apaturina erminea papuana Ribbe, 1886
- Apaturina erminea sorimachii Morita & Kawamura, 1998
- Apaturina erminea xanthocera Rothschild, 1904
- Cyrestis achates achates Butler, 1865
- Cyrestis achates nedymnus C. & R. Felder, 1865
- Cyrestis acilia acilia (Godart, 1819)
- Cyrestis acilia dola Fruhstorfer, 1904
- Cyrestis acilia fratercula (Salvin & Godman, 1877)
- Cyrestis acilia nitida (Mathew, 1887)
- Cyrestis paulinus waigeuensis Fruhstorfer, 1900
- Cyrestis telamon adaemon (Godman & Salvin, 1879)
- Cyrestis telamon bougainvillei (Ribbe, 1898)
- Dichorragia ninus distinctus Röber, 1894
- Helcyra chionippe marginata Rothschild & Jordan, 1899

=== Limenitidinae ===
- Euthalia aeropa angustifascia Joicey & Noakes, 1915
- Euthalia aeropa choirilus Fruhstorfer, 1913
- Euthalia aeropa eutychius Fruhstorfer, 1913
- Euthalia aeropa nodrica Boisduval, 1832
- Euthalia aetion donata (Fruhstorfer, 1907)
- Euthalia aetion philomena (Fruhstorfer, 1905)
- Neptis brebissonii brebissonii (Boisduval, 1832)
- Neptis brebissonii dulcinea Grose-Smith, 1898
- Neptis brebissonii metioche Fruhstorfer, 1908
- Neptis nausica lyria Fruhstorfer, 1908
- Neptis nausica nausica de Nicéville, 1897
- Neptis nausica nivalis Talbot, 1932
- Neptis nausica symbiosa Fruhstorfer, 1908
- Neptis nausica syxosa Fruhstorfer, 1908
- Neptis praslini dorcas Grose-Smith, 1894
- Neptis praslini maionia Fruhstorfer, 1908
- Neptis praslini meforensis Eliot, 1969
- Neptis praslini messogis Fruhstorfer, 1908
- Neptis praslini praslini (Boisduval, 1832)
- Neptis praslini ronensis Grose-Smith, 1899
- Neptis praslini woodlarkiana (Montrouzier, 1856)
- Neptis satina Grose-Smith, 1894
- Pantoporia consimilis biaka Eliot, 1969
- Pantoporia consimilis consimilis (Boisduval, 1832)
- Pantoporia consimilis continua (Staudinger, 1888)
- Pantoporia consimilis eurygrapha (Fruhstorfer, 1908)
- Pantoporia consimilis mioswara (Talbot, 1932)
- Pantoporia consimilis novahibernica Eliot, 1969
- Pantoporia consimilis stenopa (Fruhstorfer, 1908)
- Pantoporia consimilis vulcanica Eliot, 1969
- Pantoporia venilia albopunctata (Joicey & Noakes, 1915)
- Pantoporia venilia anceps Grose-Smith, 1894
- Pantoporia venilia glyceria (Fruhstorfer, 1908)
- Pantoporia venilia louisa Eliot, 1969
- Pantoporia venilia novohannoverana (Pagenstecher, 1900)
- Pantoporia venilia pseudovenilia Fruhstorfer, 1908
- Pantoporia venilia tadema (Fruhstorfer, 1908)
- Parthenos sylvia admiralia Rothschild, 1915
- Parthenos sylvia couppei Ribbe, 1898
- Parthenos sylvia guineensis Fruhstorfer, 1898
- Parthenos sylvia thesaurus (Mathew, 1887)
- Parthenos tigrina tigrina Snellen van Vollenhoven, 1866
- Phaedyma ampliata (Butler, 1882)
- Phaedyma fissizonata pisias (Godman & Salvin, 1888)
- Phaedyma shepherdi damia Fruhstorfer, 1905
- Phaedyma shepherdi gregalis (Joicey & Noakes, 1915)
- Phaedyma shepherdi maculosa (Joicey & Talbot, 1922)
- Tanaecia palguna Moore, 1857

=== Nymphalinae ===
- Doleschallia bisaltide nasica Fruhstorfer, 1907
- Doleschallia bisaltide nigromarginata Joicey & Noakes, 1915
- Doleschallia browni browni Salvin & Godman, 1877
- Doleschallia browni sciron (Godman & Salvin, 1888)
- Doleschallia dascon Godman & Salvin, 1880
- Doleschallia hexophthalmos areus Fruhstorfer, 1907
- Doleschallia hexophthalmos donus Fruhstorfer, 1915
- Doleschallia hexophthalmos kapaurensis Fruhstorfer, 1899
- Doleschallia hexophthalmos varus Fruhstorfer, 1912
- Doleschallia nacar comrii (Godman & Salvin, 1878)
- Doleschallia nacar nacar (Boisduval, 1832)
- Doleschallia nacar trachelus Fruhstorfer, 1907
- Doleschallia noorna fulva Joicey & Noakes, 1915
- Doleschallia noorna noorna Grose-Smith & Kirby, 1893
- Doleschallia rickardi Grose-Smith, 1890
- Doleschallia tongana gurelca (Grose-Smith & Kirby, 1893)
- Doleschallia tongana menexema (Fruhstorfer, 1912)
- Euthaliopsis aetion rugei (Ribbe, 1898)
- Euthaliopsis aetion sosisthenes Fruhstorfer, 1913
- Euthaliopsis aetion thieli (Ribbe, 1898)
- Hypolimnas alimena afra Fruhstorfer, 1903
- Hypolimnas alimena bateia Fruhstorfer, 1915
- Hypolimnas alimena curicta Fruhstorfer, 1912
- Hypolimnas alimena diphridas Fruhstorfer, 1912
- Hypolimnas alimena eremita Butler, 1883
- Hypolimnas alimena eremitana Strand, 1914
- Hypolimnas alimena inexpectata (Salvin & Godman, 1877)
- Hypolimnas alimena kuramata (Ribbe, 1898)
- Hypolimnas alimena obsolescens Fruhstorfer, 1903
- Hypolimnas alimena saturnia Fruhstorfer, 1903
- Hypolimnas antilope mela Fruhstorfer, 1903
- Hypolimnas antilope shortlandica (Ribbe, 1898)
- Hypolimnas antilope wagneri Clark, 1946
- Hypolimnas bolina nerina (Fabricius, 1775)
- Hypolimnas deois albosignata Talbot, 1932
- Hypolimnas deois deois (Hewitson, 1858)
- Hypolimnas deois divina Fruhstorfer, 1903
- Hypolimnas deois paleutes (Grose-Smith, 1897)
- Hypolimnas deois palladius (Grose-Smith, 1897)
- Hypolimnas deois panopion Grose-Smith, 1894
- Hypolimnas deois woodlarkiana Talbot, 1932
- Hypolimnas euploeoides Rothschild, 1915
- Hypolimnas misippus (Linnaeus, 1764)
- Hypolimnas pithoeka fumosus Joicey & Noakes, 1915
- Hypolimnas pithoeka gretheri Clark, 1946
- Hypolimnas pithoeka pithoeka Kirsch, 1877
- Hypolimnas pithoeka unicolor (Salvin & Godman, 1877)
- Junonia erigone iona Grose-Smith, 1894
- Junonia erigone leucophora Fruhstorfer, 1903
- Junonia hedonia admiralitatis (Rothschild, 1915)
- Junonia hedonia zelima (Fabricius, 1775)
- Junonia orithya neopommerana Ribbe, 1898
- Junonia orithya novaeguineae (Hagen, 1897)
- Junonia villida villida (Fabricius, 1787)
- Lexias aeropa hegias Fruhstorfer, 1913
- Mynes anemone Vane-Wright, 1976
- Mynes aroensis Ribbe, 1900
- Mynes eucosmetos cottonis (Grose-Smith, 1894)
- Mynes eucosmetos eucosmetos Godman & Salvin, 1879
- Mynes geoffroyi aureodiscus Joicey & Noakes, 1915
- Mynes geoffroyi geoffroyi (Guérin-Méneville, 1831)
- Mynes geoffroyi turturilla Fruhstorfer, 1909
- Mynes katharina Ribbe, 1898
- Mynes websteri Grose-Smith, 1894
- Mynes woodfordi woodfordi Godman & Salvin, 1888
- Symbrenthia hippoclus armis Fruhstorfer, 1912
- Symbrenthia hippoclus atta Fruhstorfer, 1904
- Symbrenthia hippoclus hippoclus (Cramer, 1779)
- Symbrenthia hylaeus hylaeus (Wallace, 1869)
- Symbrenthia hylaeus nigroapicalis Joicey & Noakes, 1915
- Yoma algina algina (Boisduval, 1832)
- Yoma algina helisson Fruhstorfer, 1912
- Yoma algina kokopona (Hagen, 1897)
- Yoma algina manusi Rothschild, 1915
- Yoma algina odilia Fruhstorfer, 1912
- Yoma algina pavonia (Mathew, 1887)
- Yoma algina vestina Fruhstorfer, 1912

=== Heliconiinae ===
- Acraea andromacha oenone (Kirby, 1889)
- Acraea meyeri Kirsch, 1877
- Acraea moluccana fumigata (Honrath, 1886)
- Acraea moluccana pella (Fruhstorfer, 1907)
- Algia felderi (Kirsch, 1877)
- Algiachroa woodfordi woodfordi (Godman & Salvin, 1888)
- Argynnis hyperbius niugini (Samson, 1976)
- Cethosia cydippe alkmene Fruhstorfer, 1902
- Cethosia cydippe cenchrites Fruhstorfer, 1909
- Cethosia cydippe cleanthis Fruhstorfer, 1902
- Cethosia cydippe cyrene Wallace, 1869
- Cethosia cydippe damasippe C. & R. Felder, 1867
- Cethosia cydippe lucina Fruhstorfer, 1905
- Cethosia cydippe schoutensis Joicey & Noakes, 1915
- Cethosia cydippe woodlarkiana Fruhstorfer, 1902
- Cethosia obscura antippe (Grose-Smith, 1889)
- Cethosia obscura gabrielis (Rothschild, 1898)
- Cethosia obscura hormisda Fruhstorfer, 1915
- Cethosia obscura obscura Guérin-Méneville, 1831
- Cethosia vasalia Muller, 1999
- Cirrochroa imperatrix Grose-Smith, 1894
- Cirrochroa regina ducalis Wallengren, 1869
- Cirrochroa regina myra Fruhstorfer, 1907
- Cirrochroa regina regina C. & R. Felder, 1865
- Cupha crameri leonida Fruhstorfer, 1912
- Cupha melichrysos tredecia (Mathew, 1887)
- Cupha prosope alexis (Grose-Smith, 1898)
- Cupha prosope charmides Grose-Smith, 1898
- Cupha prosope cyclotas (Grose-Smith, 1894)
- Cupha prosope fumosa (Grose-Smith, 1897)
- Cupha prosope turneri (Butler, 1876)
- Cupha prosope wallacei (Felder, 1867)
- Phalanta alcippe arruanae (Felder, 1860)
- Phalanta alcippe cervina (Butler, 1876)
- Phalanta alcippe cervinides (Fruhstorfer, 1904)
- Phalanta alcippe denosa (Fruhstorfer, 1912)
- Phalanta alcippe ephyra (Godman & Salvin, 1888)
- Terinos alurgis Godman & Salvin, 1880
- Terinos maddelena Grose-Smith & Kirby, 1889
- Terinos taxiles helleri Fruhstorfer, 1906
- Terinos tethys tethys Hewitson, 1862
- Terinos tethys udaios Fruhstorfer, 1906
- Vagrans egista admiralia (Rothschild, 1915)
- Vagrans egista bismarckensis (Talbot, 1932)
- Vagrans egista pallida (Talbot, 1932)
- Vagrans egista propinqua (Miskin, 1884)
- Vagrans egista shortlandica (Fruhstorfer, 1912)
- Vindula arsinoe ada (M.R. Butler, 1874)
- Vindula arsinoe adina (Fruhstorfer, 1906)
- Vindula arsinoe archeri Samson, 1982
- Vindula arsinoe bosnikensis (Joicey & Noakes, 1915)
- Vindula arsinoe insularis (Salvin & Godman, 1877)
- Vindula arsinoe lemina (Ribbe, 1898)
- Vindula arsinoe meforica (Fruhstorfer, 1906)
- Vindula arsinoe meridionalis (Talbot, 1932)
- Vindula arsinoe rookiana (Strand, 1914)
- Vindula arsinoe sapor (Godman & Salvin, 1888)

== See also ==
- List of endemic butterflies of Indonesia
