= Delias durai =

Scientific classification
- Kingdom: Animalia
- Phylum: Arthropoda
- Class: Insecta
- Order: Lepidoptera
- Family: Pieridae
- Genus: Delias
- Species: D. durai

Binomial name
- Delias durai Mastrigt, 2006

Species of butterfly

Delias durai is a species of butterfly in the family Pieridae. It is found in Papua New Guinea. The type location is the Foja Mountains.

== See also ==
- List of butterflies of Papua New Guinea
