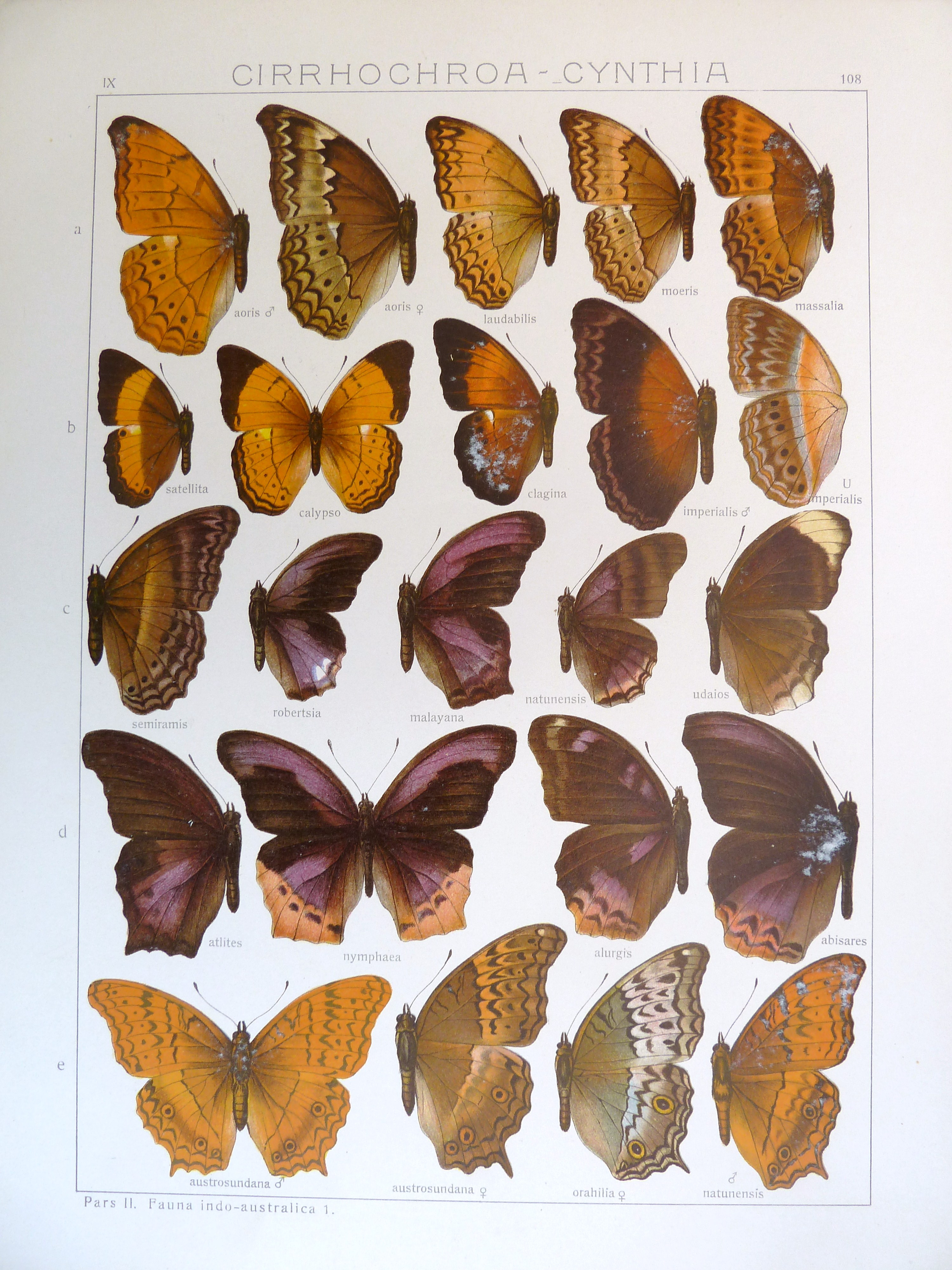
- Terinos tethys udaios in Adalbert Seitz's Die Großschmetterlinge der Erde

Scientific classification
- Domain: Eukaryota
- Kingdom: Animalia
- Phylum: Arthropoda
- Class: Insecta
- Order: Lepidoptera
- Family: Nymphalidae
- Genus: Terinos
- Species: T. tethys

Binomial name
- Terinos tethys (Hewitson, 1862)

Synonyms
- Terinos wahnesi Heller, 1902

= Terinos tethys =

Species of butterfly

Terinos tethys is a butterfly in the family Nymphalidae. It was described by William Chapman Hewitson in 1862. It is endemic to New Guinea in the Australasian realm.

== Subspecies ==
- T. t. tethys (Misool, New Guinea)
- T. t. udaios Fruhstorfer, 1906 (New Guinea: Humboldt Bay)
- T. t. wahnesi Heller, 1902 (New Guinea: Huon Peninsula)
