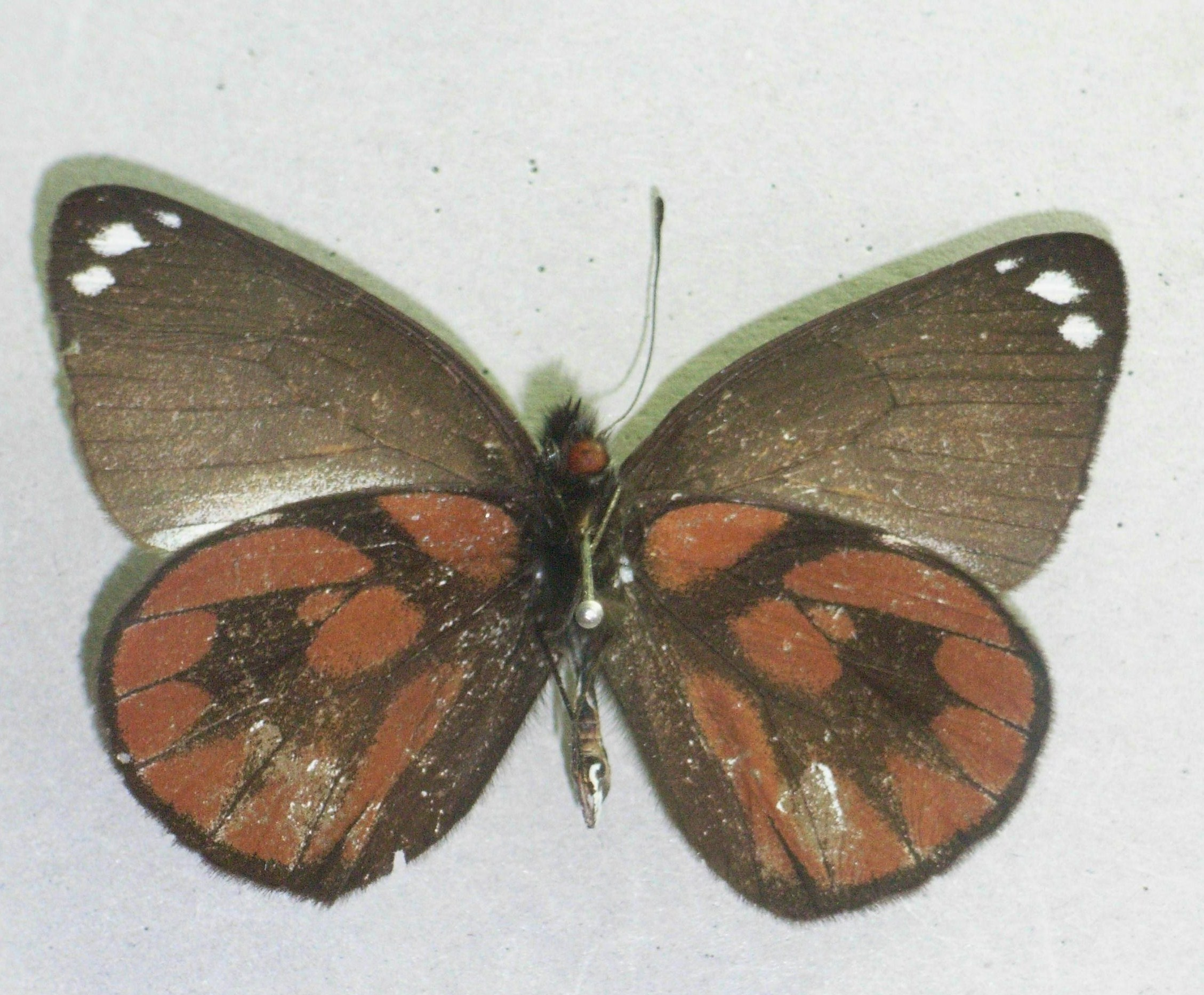

Scientific classification
- Kingdom: Animalia
- Phylum: Arthropoda
- Clade: Pancrustacea
- Class: Insecta
- Order: Lepidoptera
- Family: Pieridae
- Genus: Delias
- Species: D. nais

Binomial name
- Delias nais Jordan, 1912

Synonyms
- Delias bornemanni nais Jordan, 1912; Delias bornemanni rubrina van Eecke, 1915; Delias nais denigrata Joicey & Talbot, 1922; Delias nais holophaea Roepke, 1955; Delias zebra Roepke, 1955; Delias zebra var. reducta Roepke, 1955; Delias zebra takanamii Yagishita, 1993; Delias denigrata maruyamai Yagishita, 1993; Delias nais entima Talbot, 1937; Delias nais maprikensis Yagishita, 1993

= Delias nais =

Species of butterfly

Delias nais is a butterfly in the family Pieridae. It was described by Karl Jordan in 1912. It is endemic to New Guinea.

== Subspecies ==
- D. n. nais (Mount Goliath, Central Mountains, Irian Jaya: Western & Southern Highland Provinces, Papua New Guinea)
- D. n. aegle Joicey & Talbot, 1922 (Central Highlands, Papua New Guinea)
- D. n. beehleri van Mastrigt 2011 (Foja Mounts, West Papua)
- D. n. keysseri Rothschild, 1925 Rawlinson Mtns, Papua New Guinea
- D. n. odilae Gotts & Ginn, 2004 (Prince Alexander Mountains, Papua New Guinea)
