= Arhopala asma =

Scientific classification
- Kingdom: Animalia
- Phylum: Arthropoda
- Class: Insecta
- Order: Lepidoptera
- Family: Lycaenidae
- Genus: Arhopala
- Species: A. asma

Binomial name
- Arhopala asma Evans, 1957

Synonyms
- Narathura asma

Species of butterfly

Arhopala asma is a butterfly in the family Lycaenidae. It was discovered by William Harry Evans in 1957. It is found on Woodlark Island. This species is monotypic.

== Description ==
The male is dull pale blue above with a border of 2.5 millimeters. The female is light blue with a thicker black border. The underside is light grey for both sexes, with the marking edged with white.
