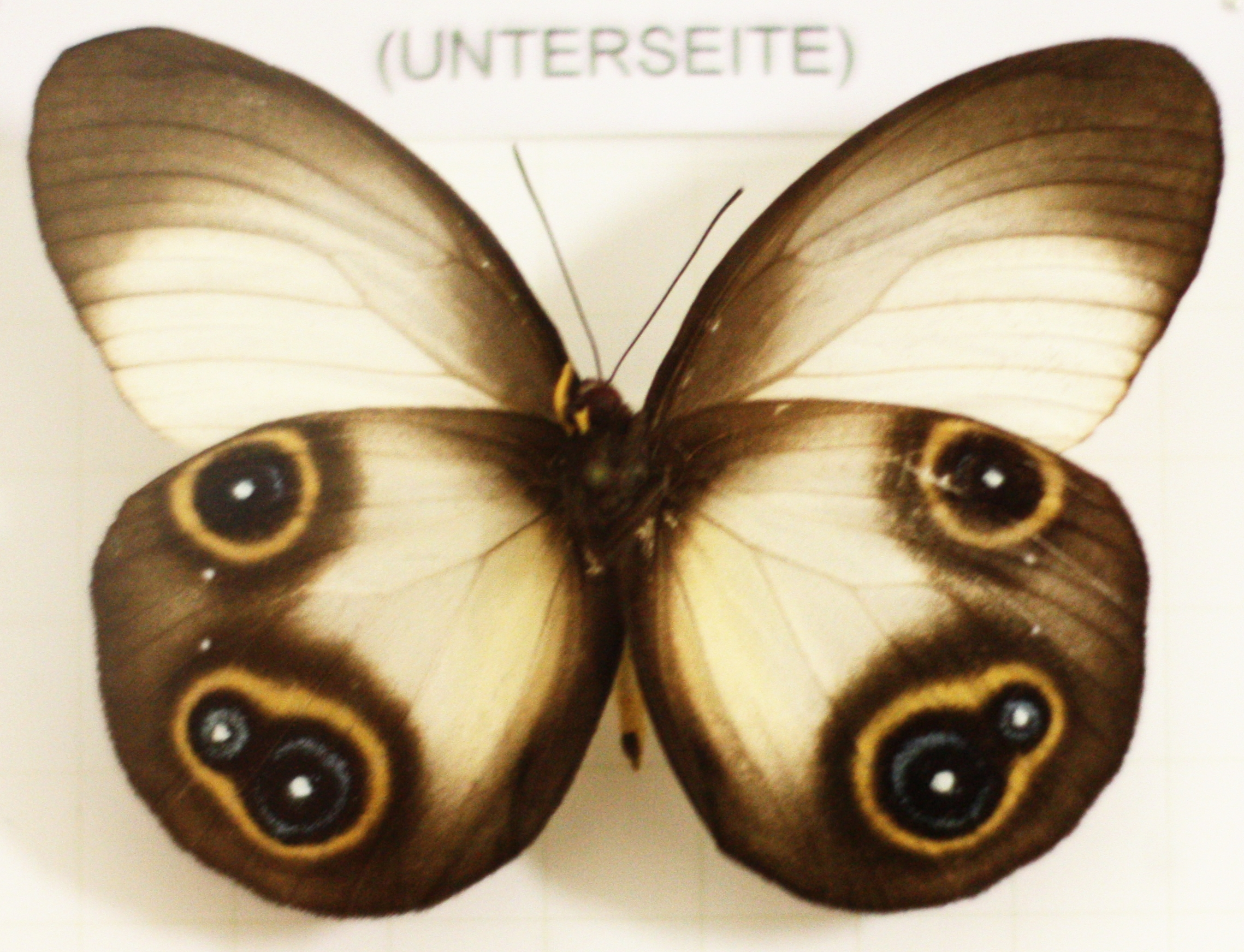

Scientific classification
- Domain: Eukaryota
- Kingdom: Animalia
- Phylum: Arthropoda
- Class: Insecta
- Order: Lepidoptera
- Family: Nymphalidae
- Genus: Taenaris
- Species: T. dimona

Binomial name
- Taenaris dimona (Hewitson, 1862)

Synonyms
- Drusilla dimona Hewitson, 1862; Tenaris dimona desdemona Staudinger, 1888; Tenaris dinora Grose-Smith & Kirby, 1896; Tenaris microps Grose-Smith, 1894

= Taenaris dimona =

Species of butterfly

Taenaris dimona is a butterfly in the family Nymphalidae. It was first described by William Chapman Hewitson in 1862. It is found in the Australasian realm.

== Subspecies ==
- T. d. dimona (Serang, Ambon)
- T. d. dinora Grose-Smith & Kirby, 1896 (New Guinea)
- T. d. sorronga Fruhstorfer, 1905 (New Guinea: Sorong)
- T. d. offaka Fruhstorfer, 1905 (Waigeu)
- T. d. dimonata Stichel, 1906 (Salawati)
- T. d. didorus Brooks, 1944 (Misool)
- T. d. aruensis Brooks, 1944 (Aru)
- T. d. anna Fruhstorfer, 1915 (New Guinea: Arfak)
- T. d. kapaura Fruhstorfer, 1904 (New Guinea: Onin Peninsula to Geelvink Bay)
- T. d. zaitha Fruhstorfer, 1914 (New Guinea: Snow Mountains)
- T. d. microps Grose-Smith, 1894 (New Guinea: Humboldt Bay)
- T. d. areia Fruhstorfer, 1904 (New Guinea: Astrolabe Bay to Finschhaffen)
- T. d. thaema Fruhstorfer, 1915 (Huon Peninsula)
- T. d. sophaineta Fruhstorfer, 1914 (Yule Island)
