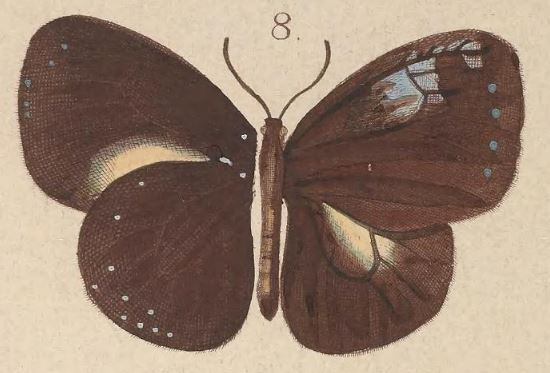
- Euploea stephensii sisamis from Theodor Franz Wilhelm Kirsch's Lepidopteren-Fauna von Neu-Guinea

Scientific classification
- Domain: Eukaryota
- Kingdom: Animalia
- Phylum: Arthropoda
- Class: Insecta
- Order: Lepidoptera
- Family: Nymphalidae
- Genus: Euploea
- Species: E. stephensii

Binomial name
- Euploea stephensii Felder C. & Felder R., 1865

Synonyms
- Euploea trimenii C. & R. Felder, [1865]; Euploea salabanda Kirsch, 1877; Euploea sisamis Kirsch, 1877; Calliploea engramelli Moore, 1883; parvior Tryon, 1890; Calliploea adyte cledonia Fruhstorfer, 1904; Calliploea trimeni duilia Fruhstorfer, 1904; Calliploea adyte obiana Fruhstorfer, 1904; Calliploea adyte parallelis Fruhstorfer, 1904; anaitis Fruhstorfer, 1910; parvipunctata Fruhstorfer, 1910; amantia Fruhstorfer, 1910; Euploea vulcanica Rothschild, 1915; simplificata Hulstaert, 1924; Euploea pumila Butler, 1866; Calliploea lucinda Grose-Smith, 1894; Calliploea jamesi Butler, [1877]; Calliploea infantilis Butler, [1877]; Calliploea kirschi Moore, 1883; Calliploea salpinxoides Fruhstorfer, 1899; Calliploea lucinda sublucinda Fruhstorfer, 1899; Calliploea salpingoides melitta Fruhstorfer, 1904; amida Fruhstorfer, 1910; Calliploea engrammeli bismarckiana Fruhstorfer, 1900; Calliploea jamesi flaminia Fruhstorfer, 1904; Calliploea phokion Fruhstorfer, 1904

= Euploea stephensii =

Species of butterfly

Euploea stephensii is a butterfly in the family Nymphalidae. It was described by Cajetan Felder and Rudolf Felder in 1865. It is found in the Australasian realm.

== Subspecies ==
- E. s. stephensii (New Guinea)
- E. s. pumila Butler, 1866 (New Guinea)
- E. s. jamesi (Butler, [1877]) (Southeast New Guinea - Papua, Samarai, Tagula Island, Goodenough, Normanby, Fergusson Island)
- E. s. kirschi (Moore, 1883) (Waigeu)
- E. s. salpinxoides (Fruhstorfer, 1899) (West Irian, New Guinea, Manam Island)
- E. s. bismarckiana (Fruhstorfer, 1900) (Umboi Island, New Britain, Duke of York Island, New Ireland, Queen Charlotte Island)
- E. s. flaminia (Fruhstorfer, 1904) (Salawati)
- E. s. phokion (Fruhstorfer, 1904) (East New Guinea, Huon Gulf, Karkar Island)
- E. s. garcila Fruhstorfer, 1910 (West New Guinea: Sorong)
- E. s. manusi Carpenter, 1942 (Admiralty Islands)
- E. s. nivana Carpenter, 1953 (Nivani Islands)
