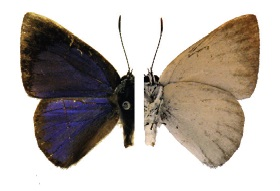
- P. a. apicalis
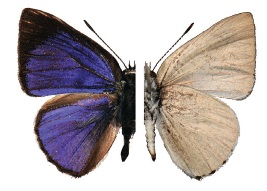
- P. a. ginni

Scientific classification
- Domain: Eukaryota
- Kingdom: Animalia
- Phylum: Arthropoda
- Class: Insecta
- Order: Lepidoptera
- Family: Lycaenidae
- Genus: Philiris
- Species: P. apicalis

Binomial name
- Philiris apicalis Tite, 1963

= Philiris apicalis =

Species of butterfly

Philiris apicalis is a species of butterfly of the family Lycaenidae. It is found in New Guinea (New Britain and New Ireland).

== Subspecies ==
- Philiris apicalis apicalis (New Britain)
- Philiris apicalis ginni Müller, 2002 (New Ireland)
