= Hewitsoniella migonitis =

Scientific classification
- Kingdom: Animalia
- Phylum: Arthropoda
- Class: Insecta
- Order: Lepidoptera
- Family: Hesperiidae
- Genus: Hewitsoniella
- Species: H. migonitis

Binomial name
- Hewitsoniella migonitis (Hewitson, 1876)

Synonyms
- Eudamus migonitis Hewitson, 1876; Eudamus aenesius Hewitson, 1876

Species of butterfly

Hewitsoniella migonitis is a species of butterfly in the family Hesperiidae. It is found in New Guinea.
