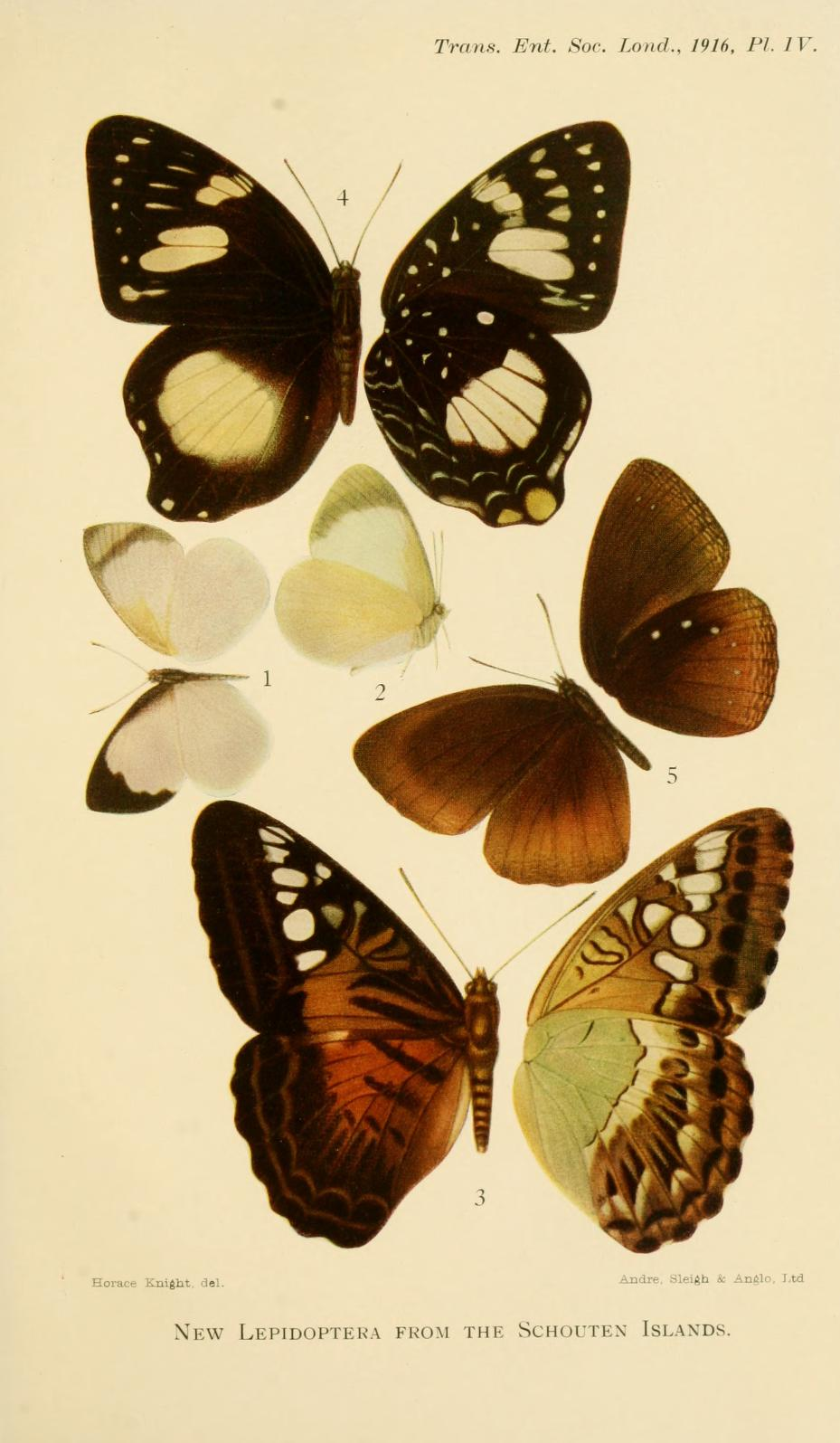
- Prothoe australis satgeii in Transactions of the Entomological Society of London (figure 4)
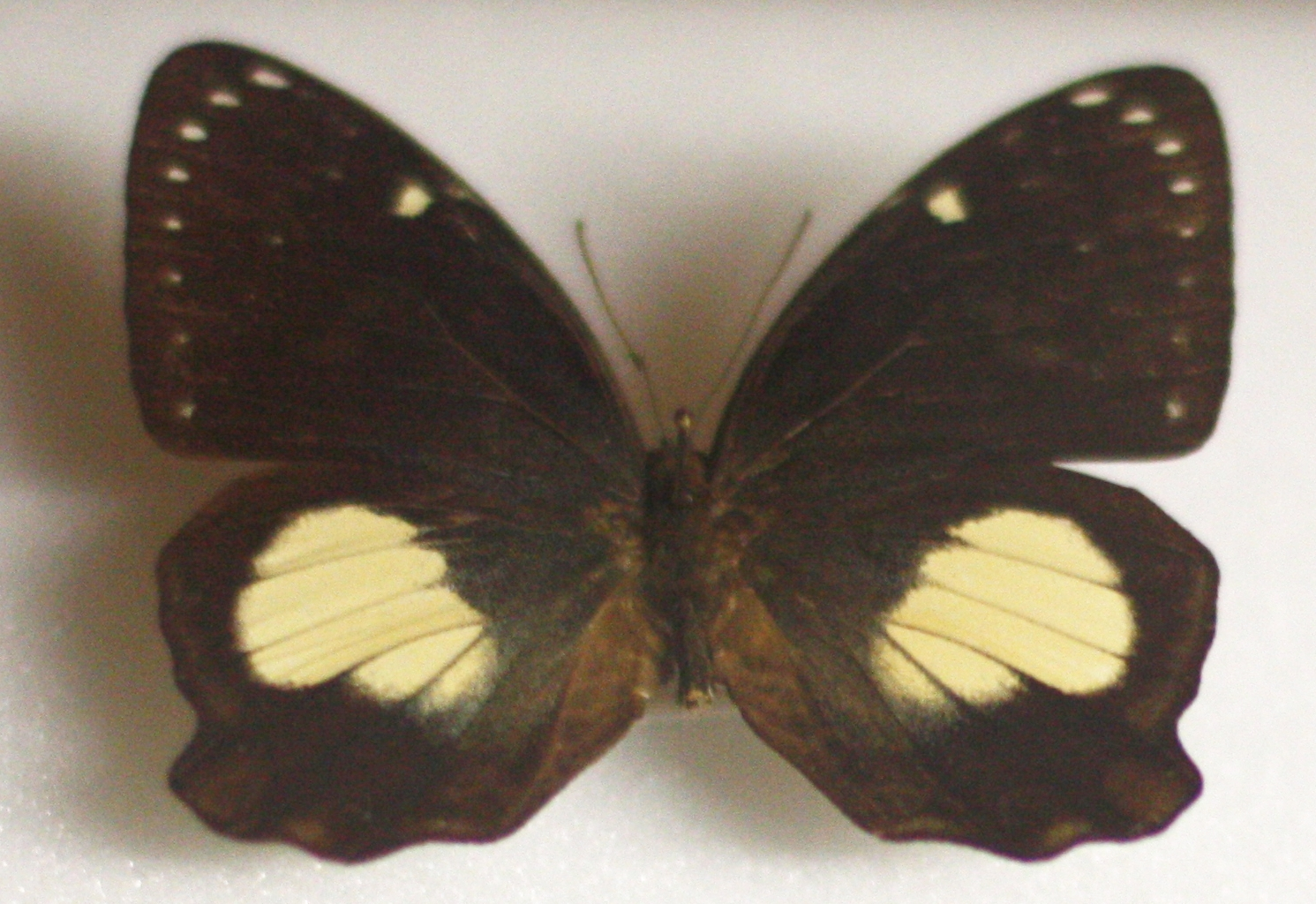

Scientific classification
- Domain: Eukaryota
- Kingdom: Animalia
- Phylum: Arthropoda
- Class: Insecta
- Order: Lepidoptera
- Family: Nymphalidae
- Genus: Prothoe
- Species: P. australis

Binomial name
- Prothoe australis (Guérin-Méneville, [1831])

Synonyms
- Nymphalis australis Guérin-Méneville, [1831]; Mynes leucis Boisduval, 1832; Mynes mulderi Vollenhoven, 1863; Prothoe westwoodii Wallace, 1869; Prothoe hewitsoni Wallace, 1869; Prothoe schoenbergi Honrath, 1888; Prothoe dohertyi Grose-Smith, 1894; guilelmi Fruhstorfer, 1913; Prothoe layardi Godman & Salvin, 1882; Prothoe schulzi Ribbe, 1898; Prothoe australis mafalda f. medodora Fruhstorfer, 1906; Prothoe australis satgeii f. bifasciata Joicey & Talbot, 1916

= Prothoe australis =

Species of butterfly

Prothoe australis is a butterfly in the family Nymphalidae. It was described by Félix Édouard Guérin-Méneville in 1831. It is found in the Australasian realm.Seitz provides a description.

== Subspecies ==
- P. a. australis (Waigeu, Misool)
- P. a. mulderi (Vollenhoven, 1863) (Batchian, Halmahera)
- P. a. westwoodi Wallace, 1869 (Aru)
- P. a. hewitsoni Wallace, 1869 (Irian Jaya)
- P. a. layardi Godman & Salvin, 1882 (New Ireland)
- P. a. schulzi Ribbe, 1898 (New Britain)
- P. a. mafalda Fruhstorfer, 1906 (Papua)
- P. a. menodora Fruhstorfer, 1906 (British New Guinea)
- P. a. decolorata Fruhstorfer, 1906 (Misool)
- P. a. satgeii Joicey & Noakes, 1915 (Biak)
