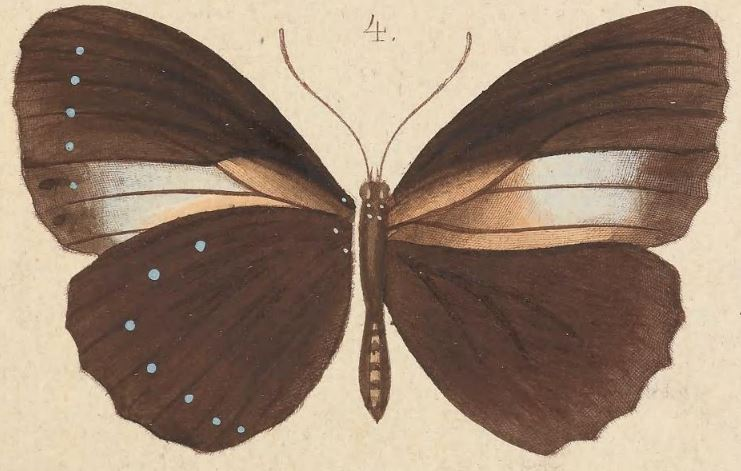
- Elymnias cybele thryallis

Scientific classification
- Kingdom: Animalia
- Phylum: Arthropoda
- Clade: Pancrustacea
- Class: Insecta
- Order: Lepidoptera
- Family: Nymphalidae
- Genus: Elymnias
- Species: E. cybele

Binomial name
- Elymnias cybele C. & R. Felder, 1860

Synonyms
- Melanitis cybele C. & R. Felder, 1860; Elymnias glauconia var. chloera Staudinger, 1894; Dyctis astrifera Butler, 1874; Elymnias cybele adumbrata Fruhstorfer, 1907; Elymnias cybele opaca Fruhstorfer, 1907; Elymnias cybele ternatana Fruhstorfer, 1907; Elymnias glauconia Staudinger, 1894; brunnescens Fruhstorfer, 1911; pseudoalpinx Fruhstorfer, 1911; terentilina Fruhstorfer, 1911; violacea Fruhstorfer; Elymnias cybele umbratilis Joicey & Noakes, 1915

= Elymnias cybele =

Species of butterfly

Elymnias cybele is a butterfly in the family Nymphalidae. It was described by Cajetan Felder and Rudolf Felder in 1860. It is found in the Australasian realm.

== Subspecies ==
- E. c. cybele (Bachan, Ternate, Halmahera)
- E. c. obiana Fruhstorfer, 1904 (Obi)
- E. c. thryallis Kirsch, 1877 (Waigeu, Mioswar Island, North New Guinea)
