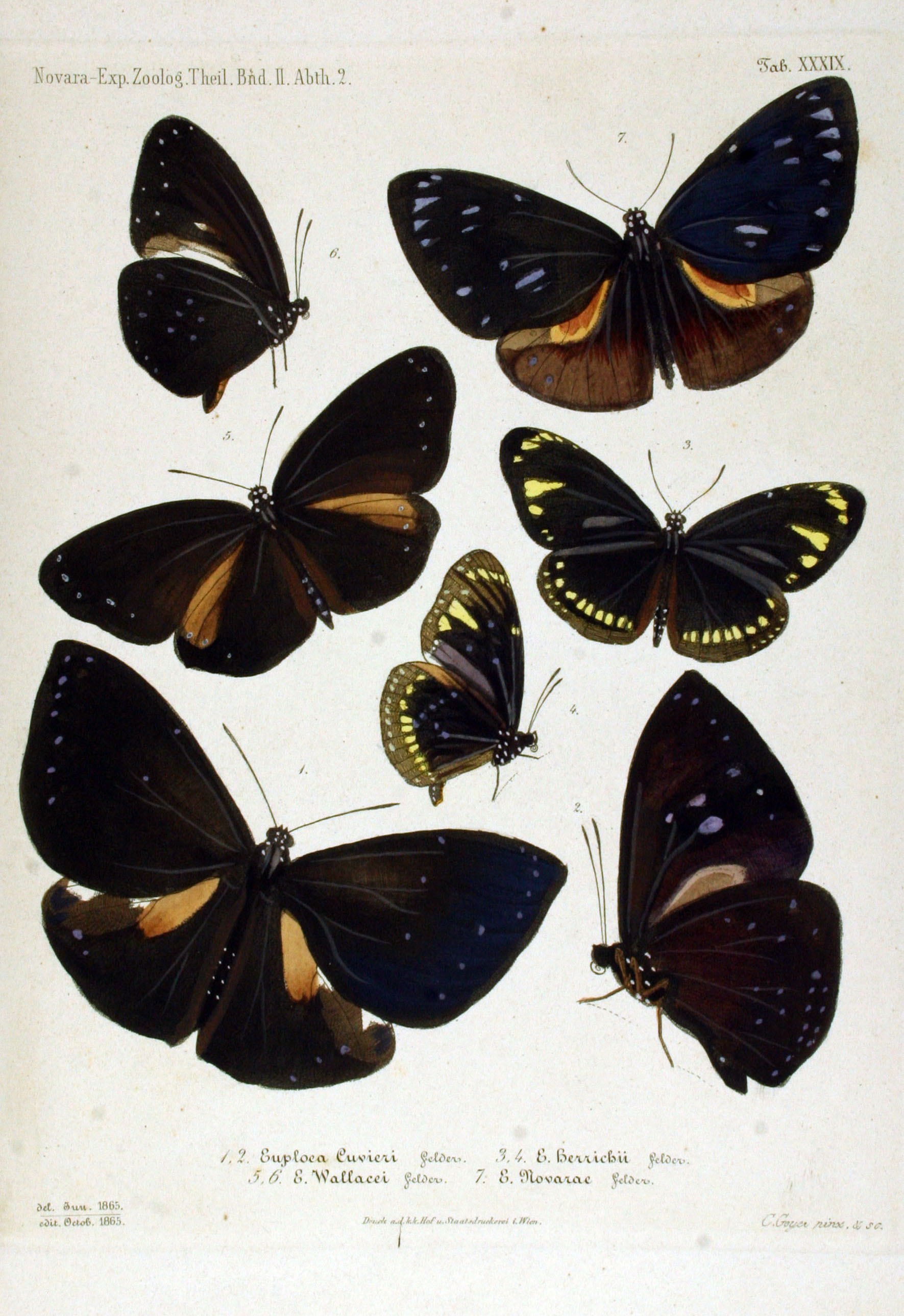
- Euploea wallacei in Felder and Felder Reise Fregatte Novara

Scientific classification
- Kingdom: Animalia
- Phylum: Arthropoda
- Clade: Pancrustacea
- Class: Insecta
- Order: Lepidoptera
- Family: Nymphalidae
- Genus: Euploea
- Species: E. wallacei

Binomial name
- Euploea wallacei C.& R. Felder, 1860

Synonyms
- felderi Moore, 1883; waigeusensis Staudinger, 1885; faunia Fruhstorfer, 1910; japudia Fruhstorfer, 1910; Euploea confusa biaka Joicey & Talbot, 1916; Euploea confusa f. mimetica Talbot, 1921; Euploea confusa marinda Hulstaert, 1923; Euploea grayi C. & R. Felder, [1865]; Euploea confusa Butler, 1866; Euploea wallacei ares Fruhstorfer, 1904; Euploea confusa melia Fruhstorfer, 1904; Euploea confusa catana Fruhstorfer, 1904

= Euploea wallacei =

Species of butterfly

Euploea wallacei is a butterfly in the family Nymphalidae. It was described by Cajetan Felder and Rudolf Felder in 1860. It is found in the Australasian realm The name honours Alfred Russel Wallace.

== Subspecies ==
- E. w. wallacei (Morotai, Ternate, Halmahera, Bachan)
- E. w. grayi C. & R. Felder, [1865] (Aru)
- E. w. confusa Butler, 1866 (Waigeu)
- E. w. gilda Fruhstorfer, 1904 (Obi, Buru)
- E. w. melia Fruhstorfer, 1904 (New Guinea to Goodenough Island, Fergusson Island)

== Biology ==
The larva feeds on Ficus and Parsonsia species.
