= Delias pulla =

Scientific classification
- Kingdom: Animalia
- Phylum: Arthropoda
- Class: Insecta
- Order: Lepidoptera
- Family: Pieridae
- Genus: Delias
- Species: D. pulla

Binomial name
- Delias pulla Talbot, 1937

Species of butterfly

Delias pulla is a butterfly in the family Pieridae. It was described by George Talbot in 1937. It is endemic to New Guinea. in the Australasian realm.

== Description ==
On the upperside of the forewing the ground colour is black, the median area white, and the basal area is grey. On the underside, the basal half of the wing is bright yellow, though it is heavily irrorated with black along the veins.

On the upperside of the hindwing the ground colour is black and the basal half grey. The cell is dusted yellow. The underside is a suffused purplish with red spots or streaks.

== Taxonomy ==
Delias pulla is a member of the nysa species group.
