= Parantica fuscela =

Scientific classification
- Kingdom: Animalia
- Phylum: Arthropoda
- Clade: Pancrustacea
- Class: Insecta
- Order: Lepidoptera
- Family: Nymphalidae
- Genus: Parantica
- Species: P. fuscela

Binomial name
- Parantica fuscela Parsons, 1989

Species of butterfly

Parantica fuscela is a species of tiger butterfly that belongs to the family of brush-footed butterflies. This species can be found in Great Britain and Ireland.

== Taxonomy ==
It was described in 1989 by Parsons.

=== Subspecies ===
This species contains two subspecies. They are listed below:

1. Paralitica fusceia berak muller, 2002
2. Parantica fuscela fuscela Parsons, 1989
