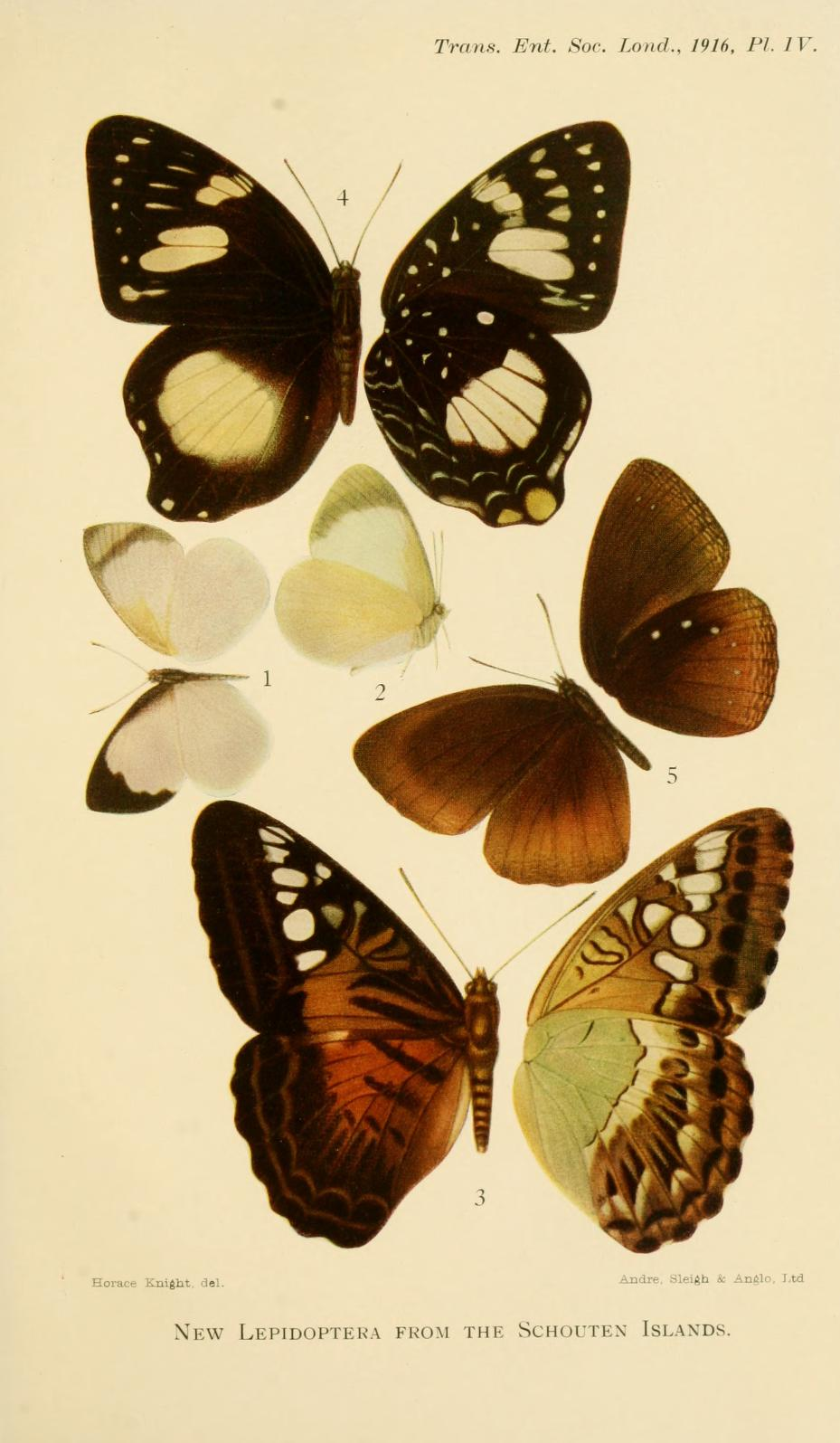
- Elymnias papua cinereomargo in Transactions of the Entomological Society of London (figure 5)

Scientific classification
- Kingdom: Animalia
- Phylum: Arthropoda
- Clade: Pancrustacea
- Class: Insecta
- Order: Lepidoptera
- Family: Nymphalidae
- Genus: Elymnias
- Species: E. papua

Binomial name
- Elymnias papua Wallace, 1869

Synonyms
- Elymnias viridescens Grose-Smith, 1894; Dyctis viridescens var. kakarona Hagen, 1897; Elymnias viridescens cinereomargo Joicey & Noakes, 1915

= Elymnias papua =

Species of butterfly

Elymnias papua is a butterfly in the family Nymphalidae. It was described by Alfred Russel Wallace in 1869. It is endemic to New Guinea in the Australasian realm.

== Subspecies ==
- E. p. papua (West Irian - Southeast New Guinea)
- E. p. lactentia Fruhstorfer, 1907 (Waigiou)
- E. p. cinereomargo Joicey & Noakes, 1915 (Biak)
- E. p. bivittata van Eecke, 1915 (New Guinea)
