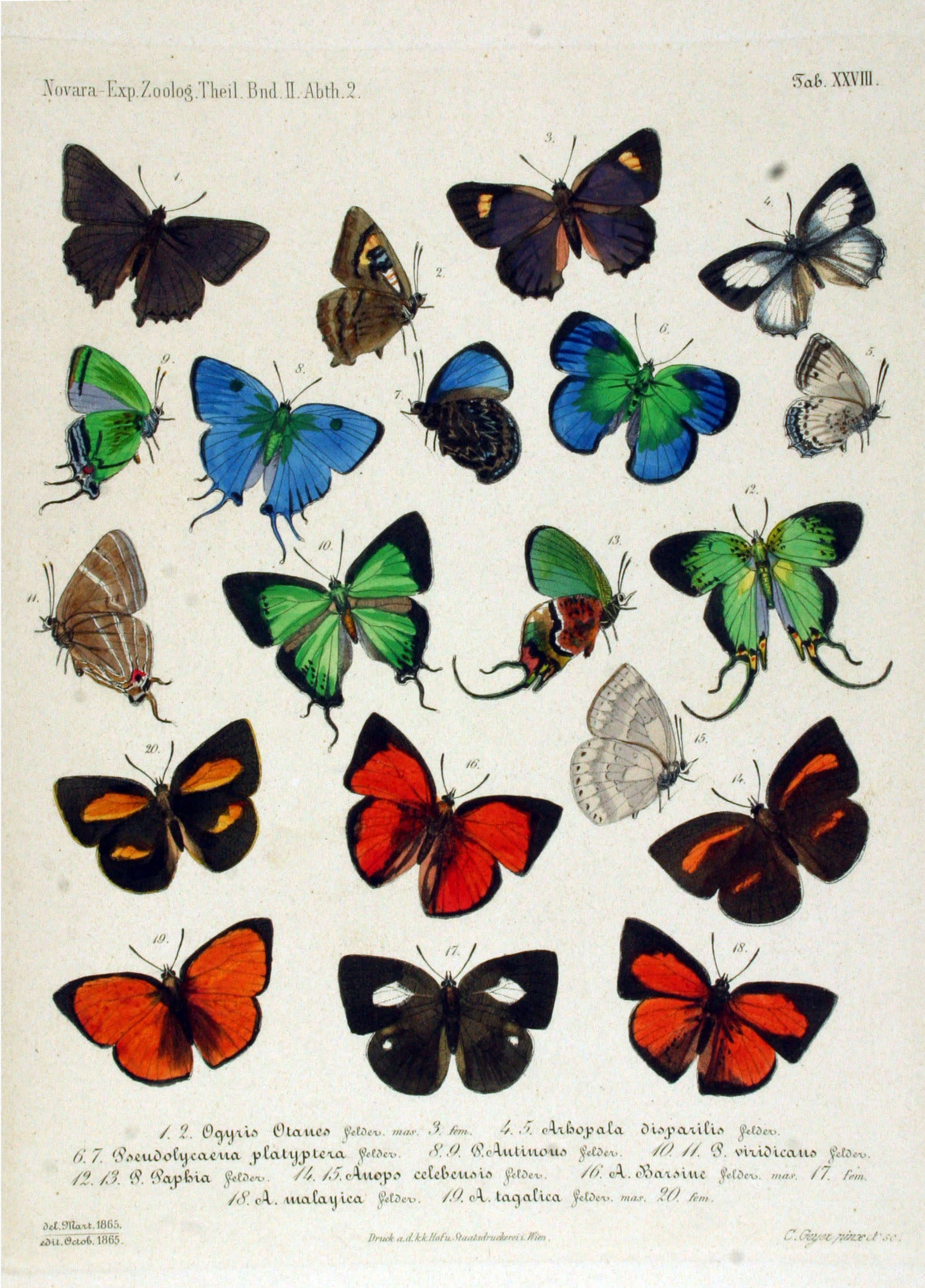
- In Reise der Österreichischen Fregatte Novara

Scientific classification
- Kingdom: Animalia
- Phylum: Arthropoda
- Clade: Pancrustacea
- Class: Insecta
- Order: Lepidoptera
- Family: Lycaenidae
- Genus: Curetis
- Species: C. barsine

Binomial name
- Curetis barsine Felder, 1860

Synonyms
- Anops egena C. & R. Felder, [1865]; Curetis solita Butler, 1882; Curetis barsine var. schortlandica Ribbe, 1899; Curetis barsine ab. georgiana Ribbe, 1899; Curetis thetis var. bougainvillei Chapman, 1915; Curetis ribbei Röber, 1886; Curetis thetis menestratus Fruhstorfer, 1908; Curetis limbatus Rothschild, 1916; Curetis thetis galinthias Fruhstorfer, 1908; Curetis thetis eberalda Fruhstorfer, 1908; Curetis thetis var. fergussoni Chapman, 1915

= Curetis barsine =

Species of butterfly

Curetis barsine is a species of butterfly belonging to the lycaenid family. It is found in the Australasian realm.

== Subspecies ==
- C. b. barsine (Ambon, Sergang)
- C. b. egena (C. & R. Felder, [1865]) (Bachan, Halmahera)
- C. b. solita Butler, 1882 (Bismarck Archipelago, Solomons)
- C. b. ribbei Röber, 1886 (Aru)
- C. b. menestratus Fruhstorfer, 1908 (New Guinea)
- C. b. galinthias Fruhstorfer, 1908 (Waigeu)
- C. b. eberalda Fruhstorfer, 1908 (Aru, Kai Island)
- C. b. fergussoni Chapman, 1915 (Fergusson Island)
