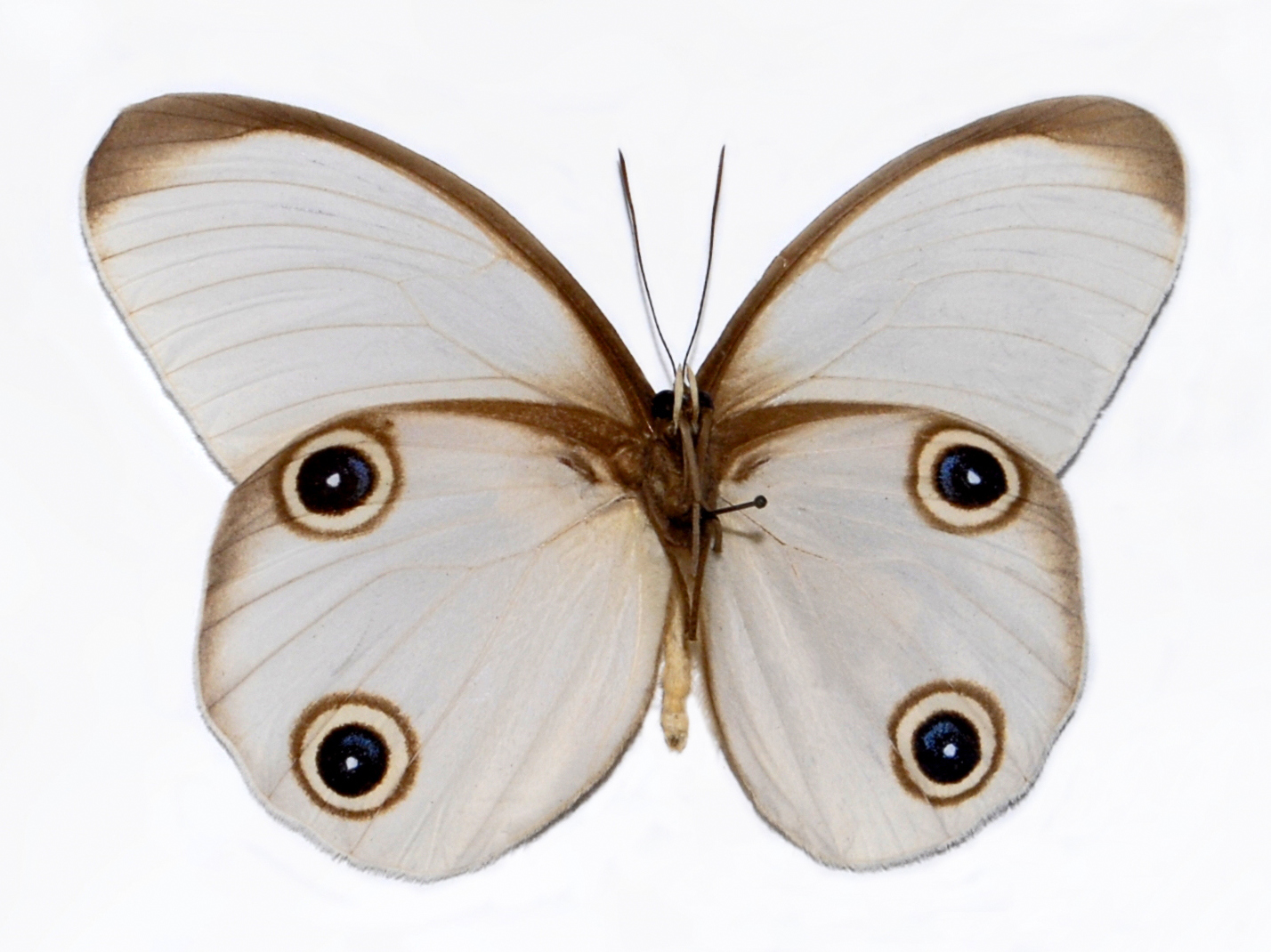
- T. m. wahnesi - mounted specimen, underside

Scientific classification
- Kingdom: Animalia
- Phylum: Arthropoda
- Clade: Pancrustacea
- Class: Insecta
- Order: Lepidoptera
- Family: Nymphalidae
- Genus: Taenaris
- Species: T. myops

Binomial name
- Taenaris myops (C. & R. Felder, 1860)

Synonyms
- Drusilla myops C. & R. Felder, 1860; Tenaris myops; Drusilla kirschi Staudinger, 1887; Taenaris rothschildi parallellus Rothschild, 1916; Taenaris rothschildi maneta Hulstaert, 1923; Tenaris rothschildi Grose-Smith, 1894; Taenaris wahnesi subquadriocellata Strand, 1911

= Taenaris myops =

Species of butterfly

Taenaris myops is a butterfly of the family Nymphalidae.

== Subspecies ==
- Taenaris myops myops - Aru
- Taenaris myops kirschii (Staudinger, 1887) - SE.New Guinea, E.Papua, SE.Papua, Yule I.
- Taenaris myops praxedes Fruhstorfer, 1904 - Salawati
- Taenaris myops parallelus Rothschild, 1916 - Misool, Waigeu
- Taenaris myops merana Fruhstorfer, 1904 - NW.West Irian
- Taenaris myops maneta Hulstaert, 1923 - S.West Irian (Merauke)
- Taenaris myops vanhaasterti Hulstaert, 1925 - SE.West Irian
- Taenaris myops ansuna Fruhstorfer, 1904 - Jobi I.
- Taenaris myops phrixus Brooks, 1950 - West Irian (Dore Bay)
- Taenaris myops rothschildi Grose-Smith, 1894 - Humboldt Bay
- Taenaris myops wahnesi Heller, 1894 - N.New Guinea (coast)
- Taenaris myops miscus Fruhstorfer, 1905 - Normanby, Goodenough I.
- Taenaris myops fergussonia Fruhstorfer, 1904 - Fergusson, Trobriand, Woodlark I.

== Description ==
Taenaris myops has a wingspan of about 80–90 millimetres (3.1–3.5 in). Wings are fuliginous grey. Upperside of each hindwing has one ocellated spot, while undersides of each hinding show two large bright eyespots, of which the centre is blackish with a small white central eye, surrounded with a pale fulvous ring.

== Distribution ==
This species can be found in New Guinea.
