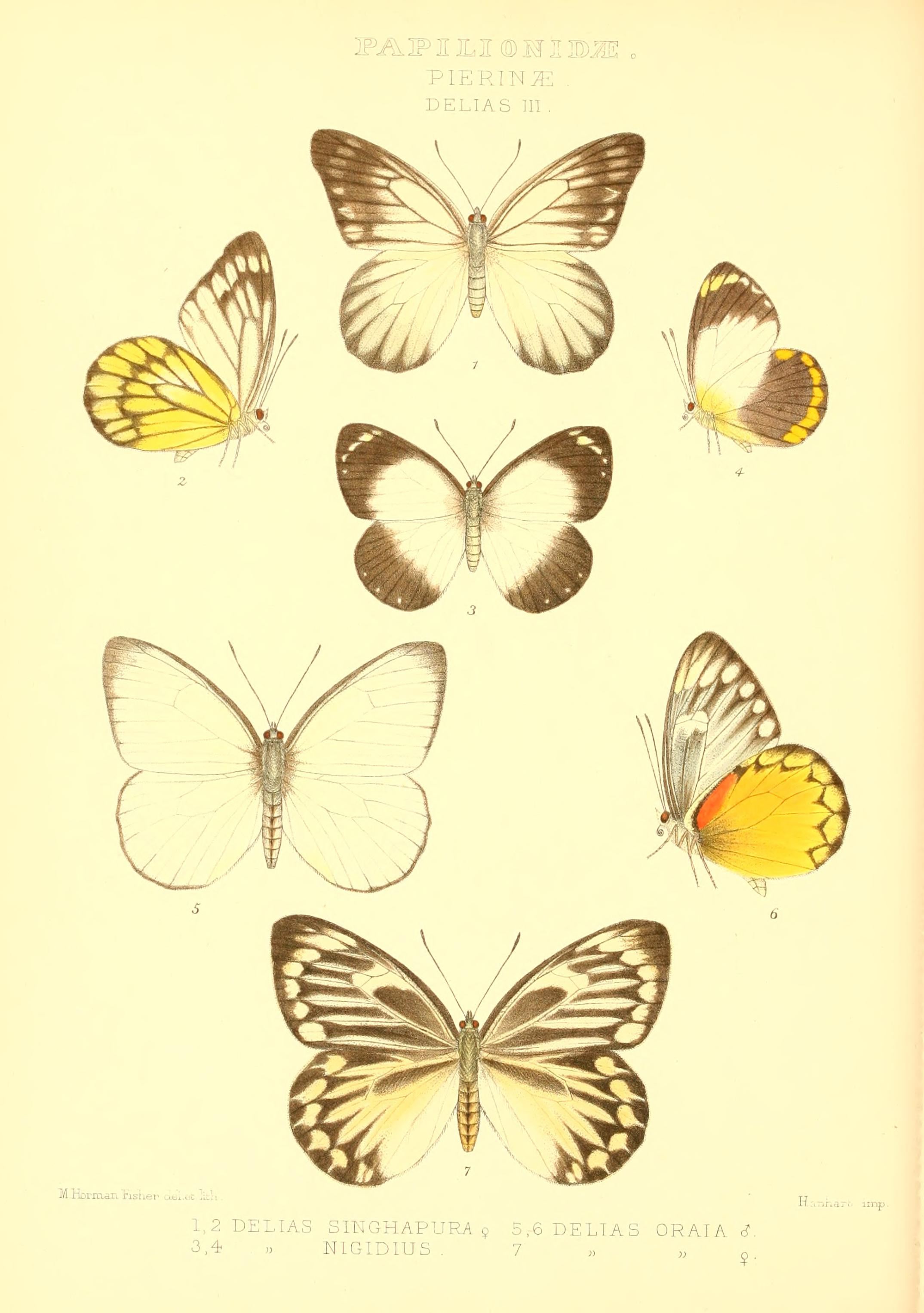
- In Henley Grose-Smith and William Forsell Kirby's Rhopalocera exotica

Scientific classification
- Kingdom: Animalia
- Phylum: Arthropoda
- Class: Insecta
- Order: Lepidoptera
- Family: Pieridae
- Genus: Delias
- Species: D. oraia

Binomial name
- Delias oraia Doherty, 1891

Synonyms
- Delias vasumitra Fruhstorfer, 1910; Delias trig D'Abrera, 1982

= Delias oraia =

Species of butterfly

Delias oraia is a butterfly in the family Pieridae. It was described by William Doherty in 1891. It is found in the Australasian realm.

== Description ==
Original A local form of the Indian Delias descombesi, and greatly resembling it. It lacks, however, the black marginal band of descombesii, the costa and outer margin of both wings being slenderly grey, especially at the ends of the veins, the cilia lemon. Below the five subapical lunules on the forewing are yellow, not white. The female is generally brighter coloured than that of descombesii. The hindwing, however, is much darker over the base and disc, but below the submarginal spots are bright lemon, and the hind-margin rich ochreous. Sambawa, 2—5000 feet, scarce. The specific name means beautiful in modern Greek. I thought it unnecessary to give my detailed description of the species.The reappearance in Sambawa of a local form of an Indo-Malayan butterfly unknown to Java, is remarkable.

== Subspecies ==
- D. o. oraia (Lombok, Sumbawa)
- D. o. adonarensis Rothschild, 1925 (Adonara, Alor)
- D. o. bratana Kalis, 1941 (Bali)
- D. o. lydia Fruhstorfer, 1897 (Flores)
- D. o. solorensis Yagishita & Nakano, 1993 (Solor)

== Taxonomy ==
It is a member of the belisama group which includes

- Delias belisama
- Delias descombesi
- Delias oraia
- Delias splendida
- Delias zebuda
- Delias eumolpe
- Delias madetes
- Delias aurantia
- Delias aruna
- Delias levicki
- Delias apoensis
- Delias diaphana
- Delias ellipsis
- Delias aganippe
