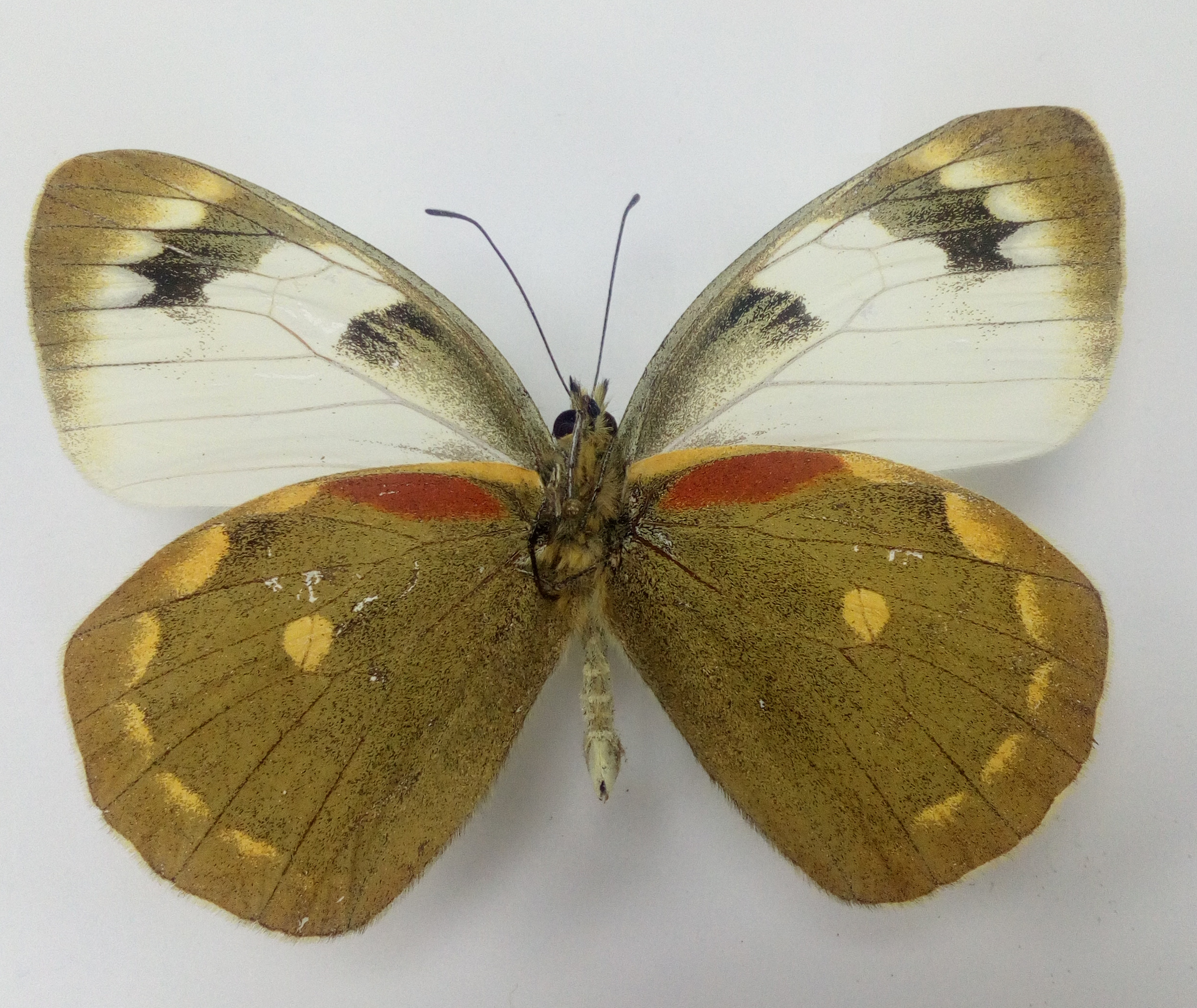

Scientific classification
- Kingdom: Animalia
- Phylum: Arthropoda
- Class: Insecta
- Order: Lepidoptera
- Family: Pieridae
- Genus: Delias
- Species: D. apoensis

Binomial name
- Delias apoensis Talbot, 1928

= Delias apoensis =

Species of butterfly

Delias apoensis is a species of pierine butterfly endemic to Mindanao, in the Philippines. The type locality is Mount Apo, Mindanao.

== Description ==
The upperside (recto) wings ground colour white with black margins on the forewings. Underside (verso) forewings white with greenish wing apex, a basal black costal stripe and a short black bar distad beginning at the costa. Underside hindwing dark green with black dusting. Reddish streak in cell 7, single yellow discal spot and row of yellow marginal spots. The wingspan is 62–75 mm.

== Subspecies ==
- Delias apoensis apoensis (Mt. Apo, Mindanao)
- Delias apoensis maizurui Yagishita & Nakano, 1993 (Mt. Kitanlad, Mindanao)

== Taxonomy ==
It is a member of the belisama group which includes

- Delias belisama
- Delias descombesi
- Delias oraia
- Delias splendida
- Delias zebuda
- Delias eumolpe
- Delias madetes
- Delias aurantia
- Delias aruna
- Delias levicki
- Delias apoensis
- Delias diaphana
- Delias ellipsis
- Delias aganippe
