= Delias eumolpe =

Scientific classification
- Kingdom: Animalia
- Phylum: Arthropoda
- Clade: Pancrustacea
- Class: Insecta
- Order: Lepidoptera
- Family: Pieridae
- Genus: Delias
- Species: D. eumolpe

Binomial name
- Delias eumolpe Grose-Smith, 1889

Synonyms
- Delias eumolpe f. philomela Rober 1919

Species of butterfly

Delias eumolpe is a butterfly in the family Pieridae. It was described by Henley Grose-Smith in 1889. It is found in the Indomalayan realm. It is endemic to Borneo.

== Description ==
Male:Upperside Forewing has a white ground colour with dark apical, costal, and edge border markings.Underside Hindwing: has a diagnostic dark ground colour and red submarginal spots .Upperside Hindwing: Generally white with a black marginal border that is typically narrower than that of the female. Female:Upperside.Black ground colour.There is a white spot towards the top of the forewing cell.Underside The ground colour is yellow. There is an arc of red spots in the submarginal region and a red spot at the base of the 7th cell. The female is larger than the male, with a wingspan of 80–94 mm (74–88 mm for males).

== Subspecies ==
- Delias eumolpe eumolpe (northern Borneo)
- Delias eumolpe masaeae Yagishita, 1993 (Mt Saran; Western Kalimantan)

== Taxonomy ==
It is a member of the belisama group which includes

- Delias belisama
- Delias descombesi
- Delias oraia
- Delias splendida
- Delias zebuda
- Delias eumolpe
- Delias madetes
- Delias aurantia
- Delias aruna
- Delias levicki
- Delias apoensis
- Delias diaphana
- Delias ellipsis
- Delias aganippe
