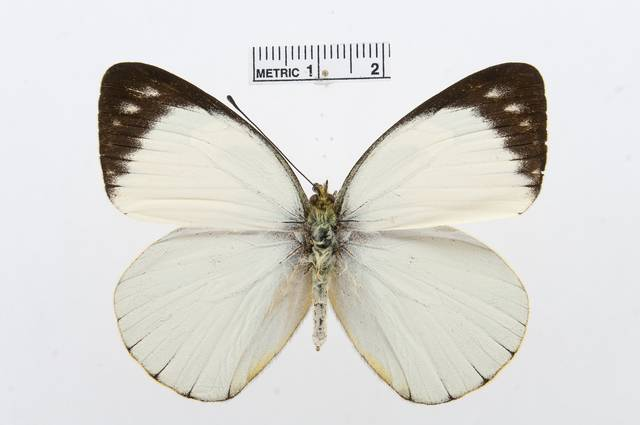

Scientific classification
- Kingdom: Animalia
- Phylum: Arthropoda
- Class: Insecta
- Order: Lepidoptera
- Family: Pieridae
- Genus: Delias
- Species: D. levicki

Binomial name
- Delias levicki Rothschild, 1927

= Delias levicki =

Species of butterfly

Delias levicki is a species of pierine butterfly endemic to Mindanao, in the Philippines. It is a montane species with different subspecies on isolated mountain ranges.

== Description ==
The main ground colour of the upperside wings is white with distinct black markings, more extensive in the female where they are more prominently dotted white.The underside hindwing is yellowish-green dusted black. The forewing verso is someimes white basally, greenish distad, these areas sparated by a submarginal arc of black spots. There is a distinct reddish streak in cell 7. The wingspan is 65–75 mm.

== Subspecies ==
- Delias levicki levicki (Mt. Apo, Mindanao)
- Delias levicki borromeoi Schroder & Treadaway, 1984 (Mt. Palket, southern Mindanao)
- Delias levicki justini Samusawa & Kawamura, 1988 (Mt. Kitanlad, northern Mindanao)
- Delias levicki hokamae Nakano, 1995 (Mt. Matutum, southern Mindanao)
- Delias levicki mandaya Yamamoto & Takei, 1982 (Mt. Tagubud, Mindanao)

== Taxonomy ==
It is a member of the belisama group which includes

- Delias belisama
- Delias descombesi
- Delias oraia
- Delias splendida
- Delias zebuda
- Delias eumolpe
- Delias madetes
- Delias aurantia
- Delias aruna
- Delias levicki
- Delias apoensis
- Delias diaphana
- Delias ellipsis
- Delias aganippe
