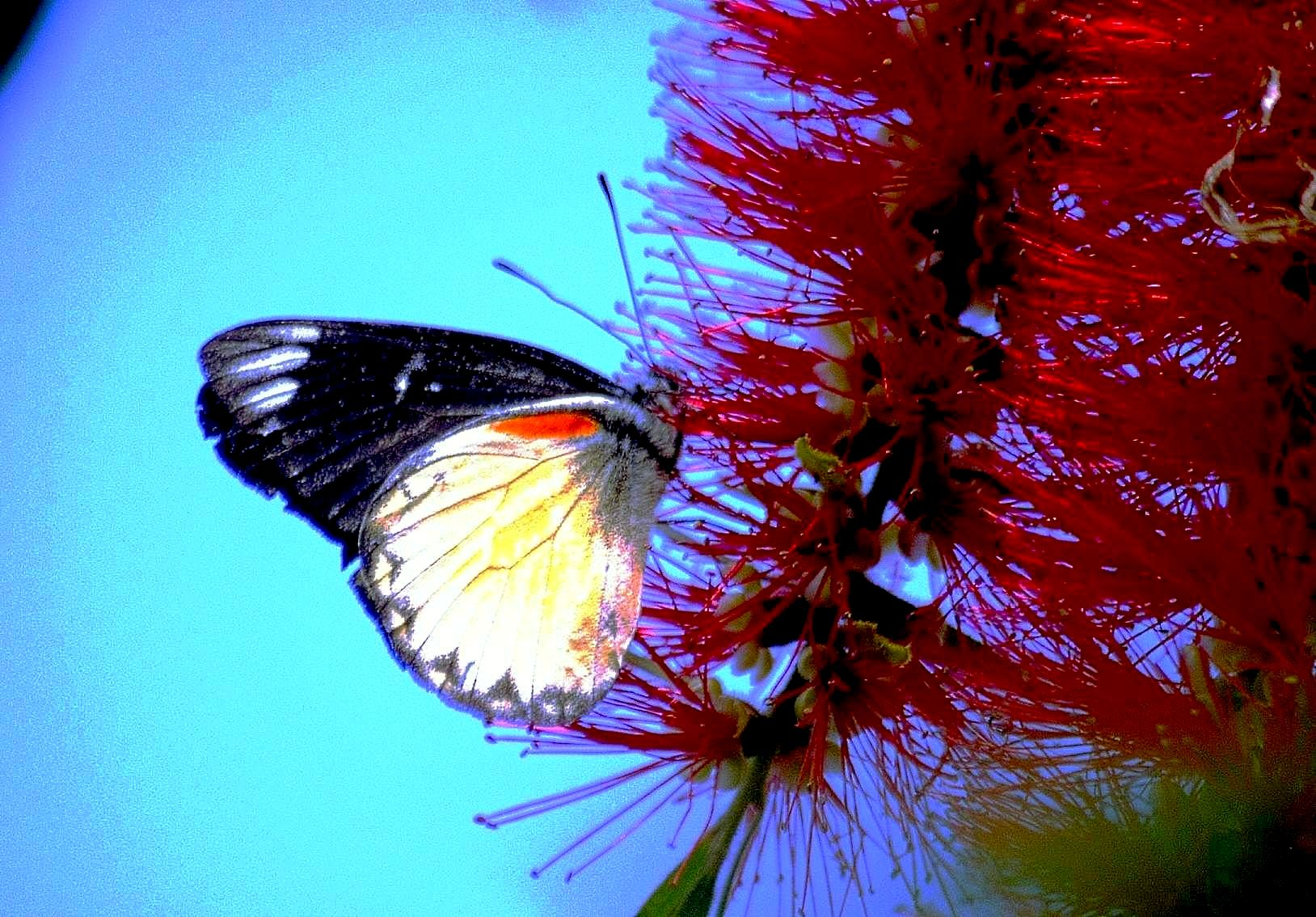

Scientific classification
- Kingdom: Animalia
- Phylum: Arthropoda
- Clade: Pancrustacea
- Class: Insecta
- Order: Lepidoptera
- Family: Pieridae
- Genus: Delias
- Species: D. belisama

Binomial name
- Delias belisama (Cramer, 1779)

Synonyms
- Papilio belisama Cramer, [1780]; Delias belisama var. belisar Staudinger, 1891; Delias belisama var. vestalina Staudinger, 1891; Delias belisama var. erubescens Staudinger, 1891; Pieris glauce Butler, 1865; Delias nakula Grose-Smith & Kirby, 1889; Pieris sthenobaea Boisduval, 1836

= Delias belisama =

Species of butterfly

Delias belisama is a butterfly in the family Pieridae. It was described by Pieter Cramer in 1779. It is found in the Indomalayan realm.

== Description ==
The main ground colour of the upperside wings is white.with distinct black markings, most notably on the wing tips but extending along the margins of both wings.The ground varies var. belisar Staudinger, 1891 has a brilliant orange-coloured upper surface var.atisha Fruhstorfer has a uniformly dark ochre- yellow upper surface var. erubescens Staudinger, 1891 has a reddish tinge. The underside is variously patterned yellow and black with a prominent red streak, spot or stripe in Cell 7.The wingspan is about 74–84 mm.

== Subspecies ==
- D. b. belisama (western and central Java)
- D. b. glauce (Butler, 1865) (Sumatra) a strongly darkened, distinct subspecies of larger size with almost entirely black under surface to the forewing which bears only slight traces of white or yellow submarginal spots.
- D. b. nakula Grose-Smith & Kirby, 1889 (eastern Java) -dark yellow proximal part (rainy-season form) and yogini Fruhstorfer with whitish or light yellow basal part on the upper surface, white instead of yellow subapical strigae on the forewing and light lemon-yellow under surface to the hindwing (dry-season form).
- D. b. balina Fruhstorfer, 1908 - a smaller race with broad light yellow hindwing without margins above and the apical border more deeply incised. The under surface of the forewing is more extended white at the inner margin. (Bali)

== Taxonomy ==
It is a member of the belisama group which includes

- Delias belisama
- Delias descombesi
- Delias oraia
- Delias splendida
- Delias zebuda
- Delias eumolpe
- Delias madetes
- Delias aurantia
- Delias aruna
- Delias levicki
- Delias apoensis
- Delias diaphana
- Delias ellipsis
- Delias aganippe
