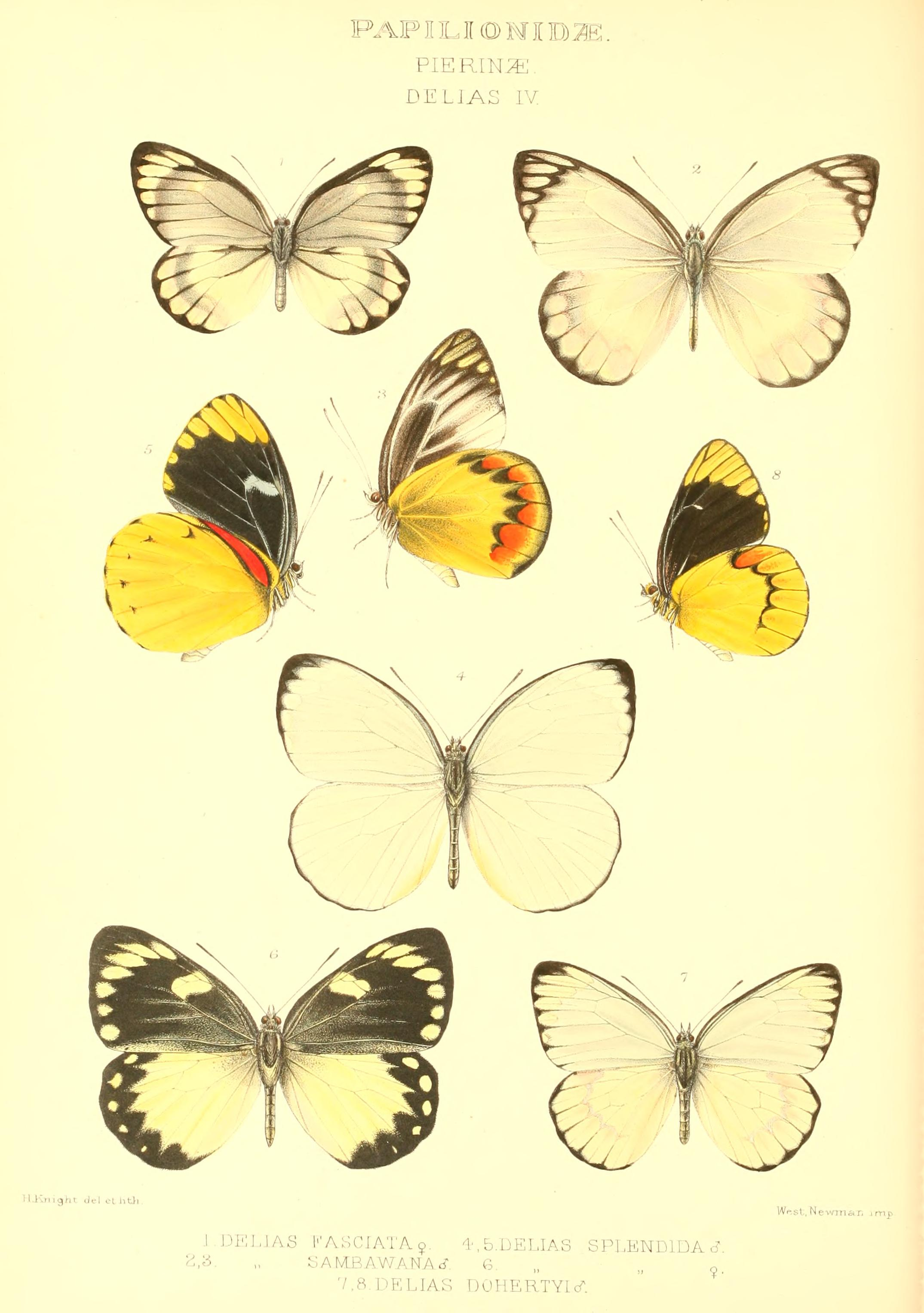
- Delias splendida in GroseSmith and Kirby Rhopalocera Exotica

Scientific classification
- Kingdom: Animalia
- Phylum: Arthropoda
- Class: Insecta
- Order: Lepidoptera
- Family: Pieridae
- Genus: Delias
- Species: D. splendida

Binomial name
- Delias splendida Rothschild, 1894

= Delias splendida =

Species of butterfly

Delias splendida is a butterfly in the family Pieridae. It was described by Walter Rothschild in 1894. It is endemic to Timor.

== Description ==
Original

Male. — Upperside : Forewings creamy white, with blackish grey costa and black apices, shading off grey on the inner side. Outer margin greyish black from a thin powdering of black scales. Hindwings creamy white, with a narrow blackish grey outer margin and a bright yellow abdominal margin, which colour expands to a streak at the anal angle. Antennae black, head and thorax deep grey, abdomen whitish, heavily powdered with black scales. Underside : Forewings black, with costa and most of the veins powdered with pale grey scales, and a large irregular grey patch at the apex of the cell. Apex of wing and submarginal row of large spots bright golden yellow. Hindwings brilliant orange yellow, with a marginal and submarginal row of small black marks. From the base of the wing between the costa and the subcostal nervure extends a large oblong fiery red patch three-quarters of an inch long. Head greyish white, thorax yellow, legs grey, abdomen white.

Female. — Upperside : Forewings black, inner margin, veins, and cell heavily powdered with white scales. A large irregular blotch of yellowish white at the apex of the cell, and from the costa to the angle of the inner margin there extends a semicircular submarginal row of large yellowish white patches. Hindwings yellowish white, powdered at the base with dark grey, and with the outer fourth of the wings occupied by a wide black border, much indented on the inner side, within which is a row of five yellowish white spots. Antennae black, head and thorax olive grey, abdomen deep blackish grey powdered with white. Underside : Forewings similar to male, but the patch in the cell is larger. Hindwings much paler and duller yellow than in the male, and the submarginal row of black spots larger and distinctly arrow-shaped. Head white, thorax yellow, abdomen white.

Expanse 3.25 inches = 83 mm.

Hab. Oinanissa (November and Decembei', 1891), and Dili (May, 1892), Timor.

== Taxonomy ==
It is a member of the belisama group which includes

- Delias belisama
- Delias descombesi
- Delias oraia
- Delias splendida
- Delias zebuda
- Delias eumolpe
- Delias madetes
- Delias aurantia
- Delias aruna
- Delias levicki
- Delias apoensis
- Delias diaphana
- Delias ellipsis
- Delias aganippe
