= Wood white =

Wood white may refer to:

- Delias aganippe, a Jezebel butterfly endemic to Australia
- Leptidea sinapis, a butterfly endemic to Europe, Russia, the Caucasus, and parts of the Middle East
- Leptosia, a genus of butterflies commonly called wood whites
