= Víctor Víctor (disambiguation) =

Víctor Víctor (1948–2020) was a Dominican guitarist, singer and composer.

Víctor Víctor may also refer to:

- Víctor Víctor Mesa (born 1996), Cuban professional baseball player
- Victor Victor Worldwide, an American record label, formerly known as Victor Victor Records

== See also ==
- Victor Victori (born 1943), South Korean portraitist, painter, sculptor, author and ordained minister
- Victor and Victoria, a 1933 German musical comedy film
  - Victor and Victoria (1957 film), a 1957 remake of the 1933 film
  - Victor/Victoria, a 1982 British-American musical comedy film
  - Victor/Victoria (musical), a Broadway musical based on the 1982 film
  - Victor/Victoria (1995 film), a television production of the Broadway musical
- "Victor, Victrola", an episode of the television series Gossip Girl
