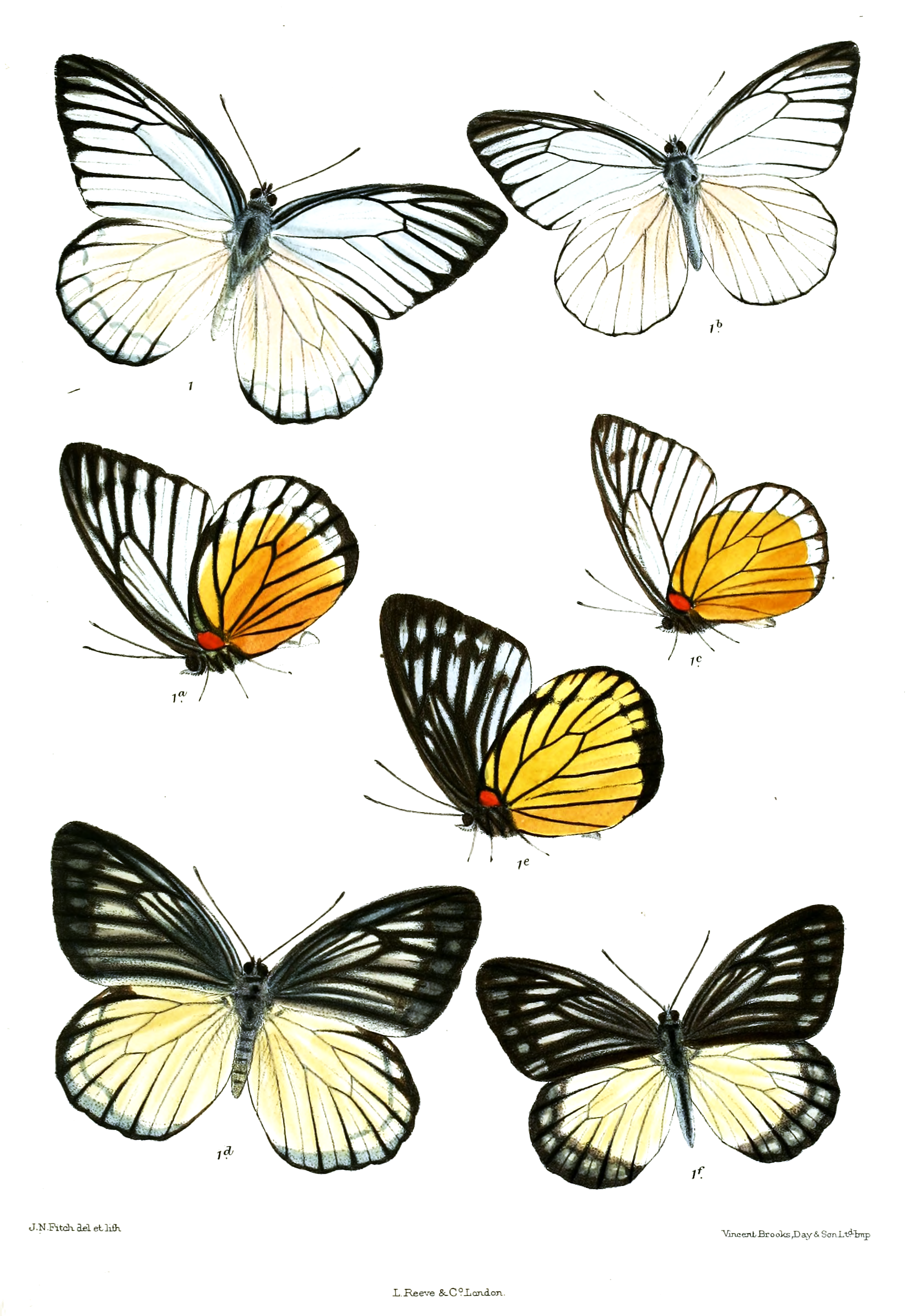

Scientific classification
- Kingdom: Animalia
- Phylum: Arthropoda
- Clade: Pancrustacea
- Class: Insecta
- Order: Lepidoptera
- Family: Pieridae
- Genus: Prioneris
- Species: P. clemanthe

Binomial name
- Prioneris clemanthe Doubleday, 1846

= Prioneris clemanthe =

Redspot sawtooth

Species of butterfly

Prioneris clemanthe, the redspot sawtooth, is a small butterfly of the family Pieridae, or the yellows and whites, and is found in Asia.

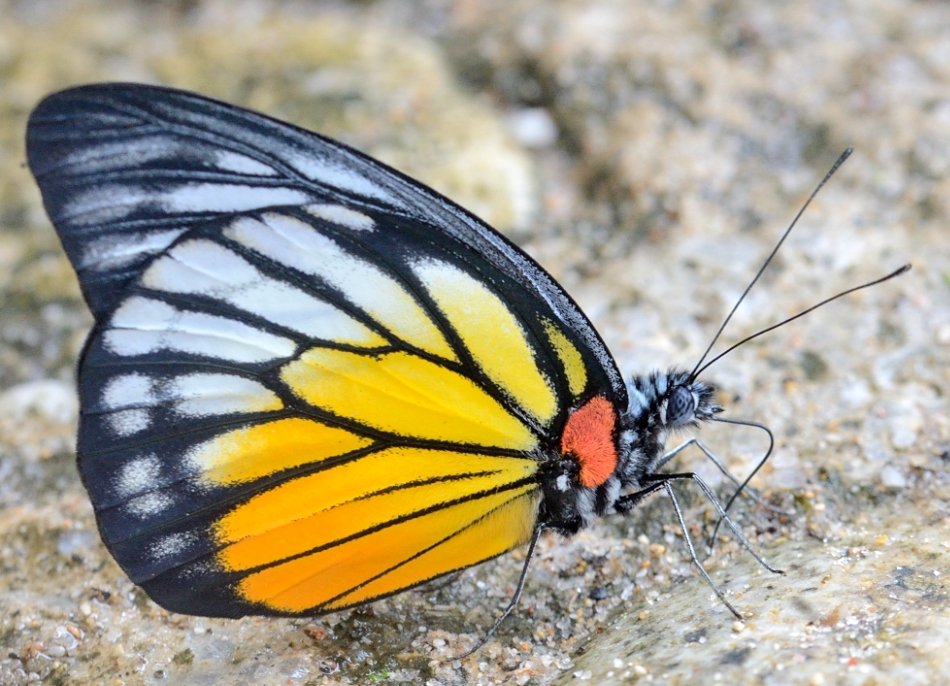
