= Delias mandaya =

Scientific classification
- Domain: Eukaryota
- Kingdom: Animalia
- Phylum: Arthropoda
- Class: Insecta
- Order: Lepidoptera
- Family: Pieridae
- Genus: Delias
- Species: D. mandaya

Binomial name
- Delias mandaya Yamamoto & Takei, 1982

Species of butterfly

Delias mandaya is a species of pierine butterfly endemic to Mindanao, in the Philippines. The type locality is the Tagubud Mountains, Mindanao. It may be a subspecies of Delias levicki.
