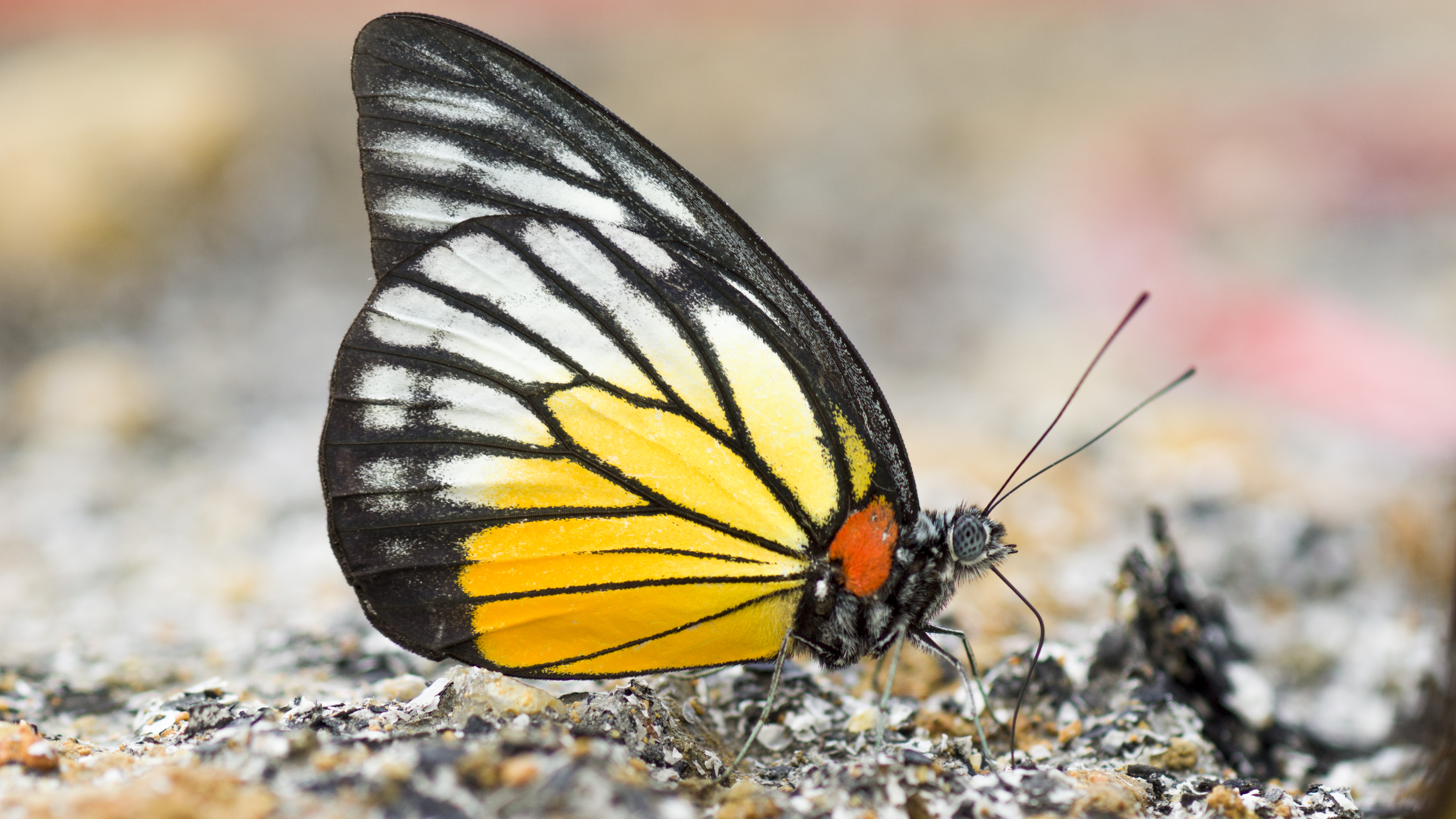
- mud-puddling

Scientific classification
- Kingdom: Animalia
- Phylum: Arthropoda
- Clade: Pancrustacea
- Class: Insecta
- Order: Lepidoptera
- Family: Pieridae
- Genus: Prioneris
- Species: P. philonome

Binomial name
- Prioneris philonome (Boisduval, 1836)

Synonyms
- Pieris philonome Boisduval, 1836; Prioneris vollenhovii Wallace, 1867; Prioneris clemanthe themana Fruhstorfer, 1903

= Prioneris philonome =

Species of butterfly

Prioneris philonome, the redspot sawtooth, is a butterfly in the family Pieridae.It was described by Jean Baptiste Boisduval in 1836. It is found in the Indomalayan realm.

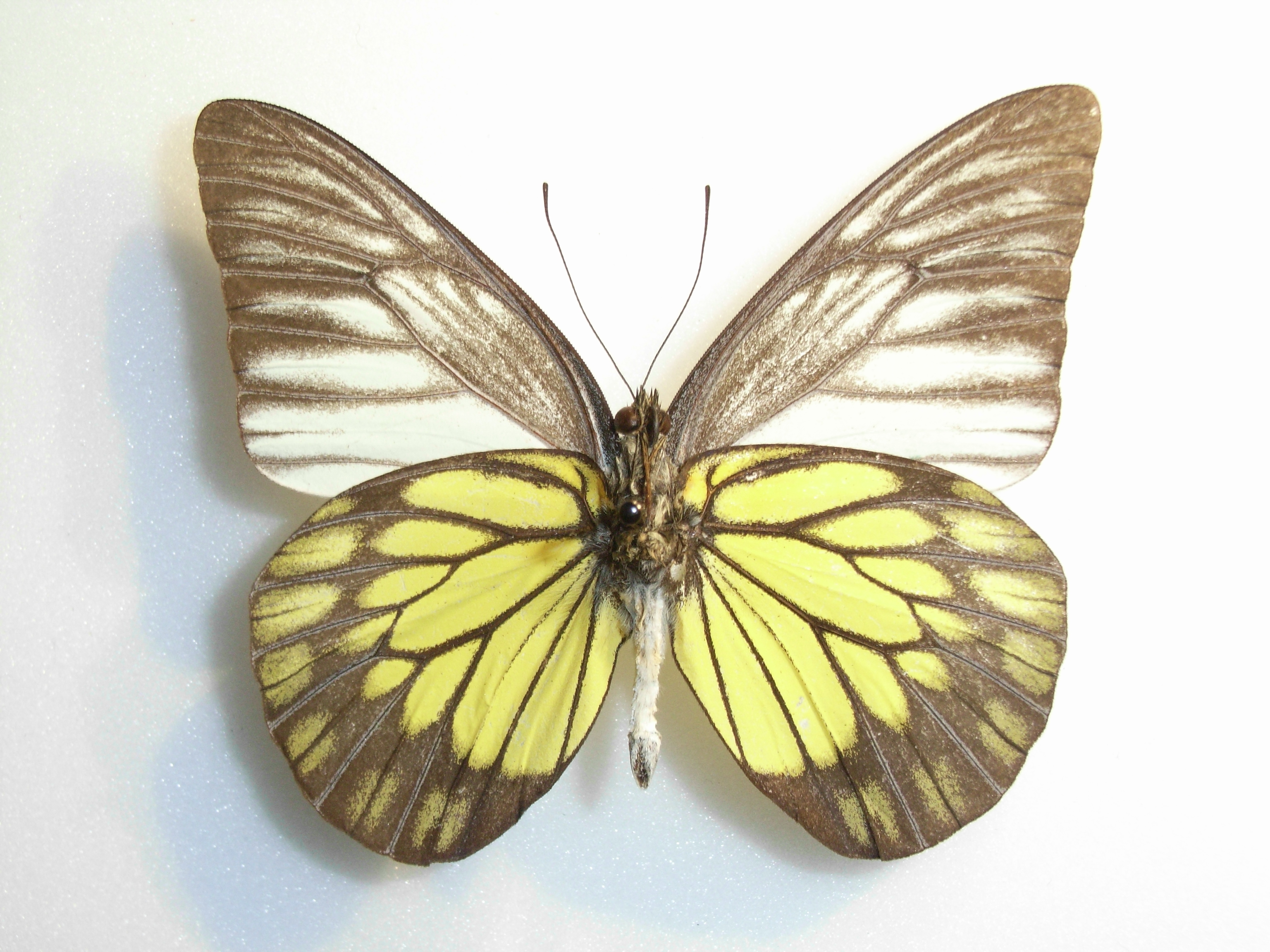
Prioneris philonome vollenhovi

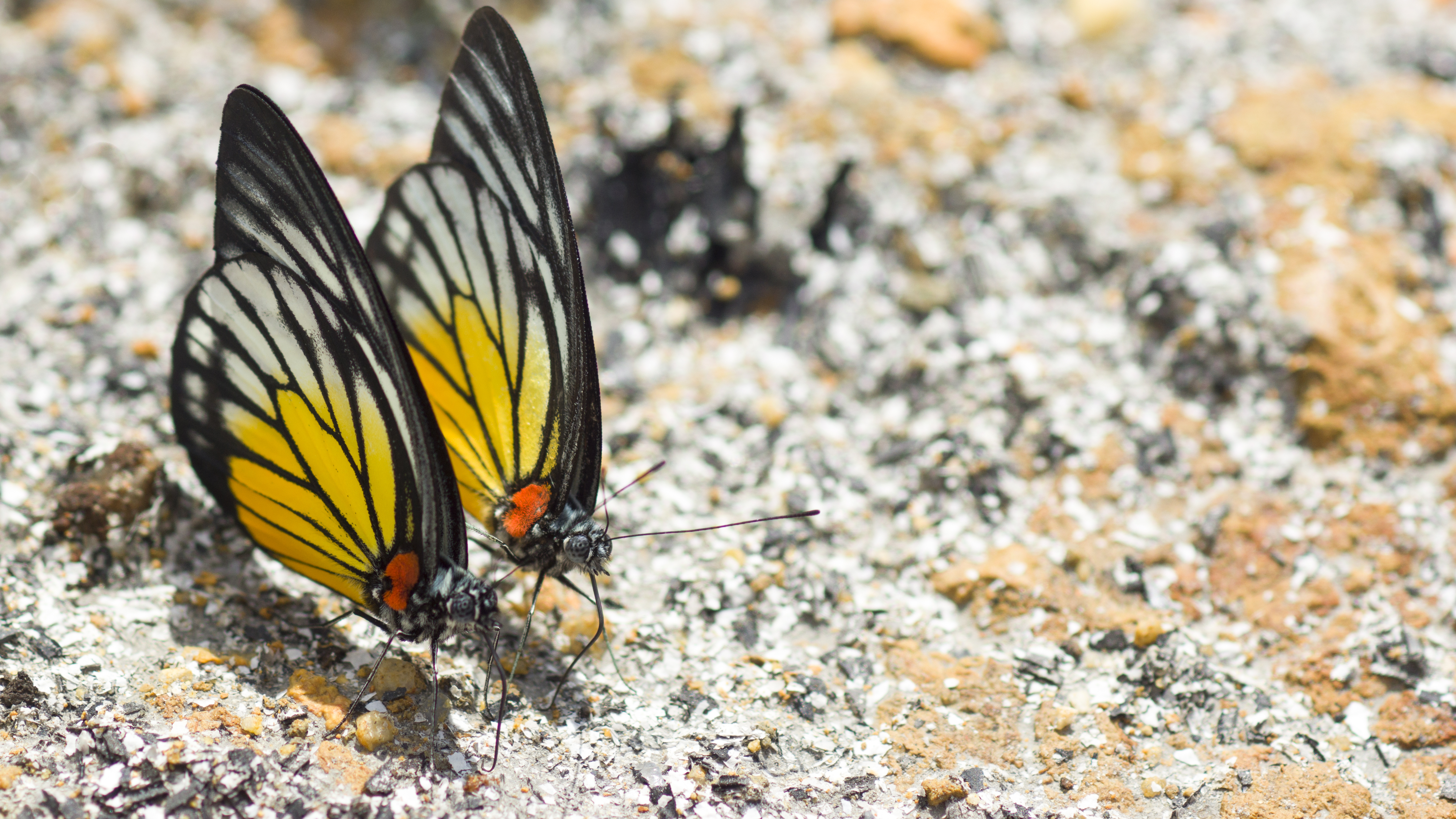
Mud-puddling

== Subspecies ==
- Prioneris philonome philonome (eastern Java)
- Prioneris philonome vollenhovii Wallace, 1867 (Borneo)
- Prioneris philonome themana Fruhstorfer, 1903 (Peninsular Malaysia, Sumatra)
