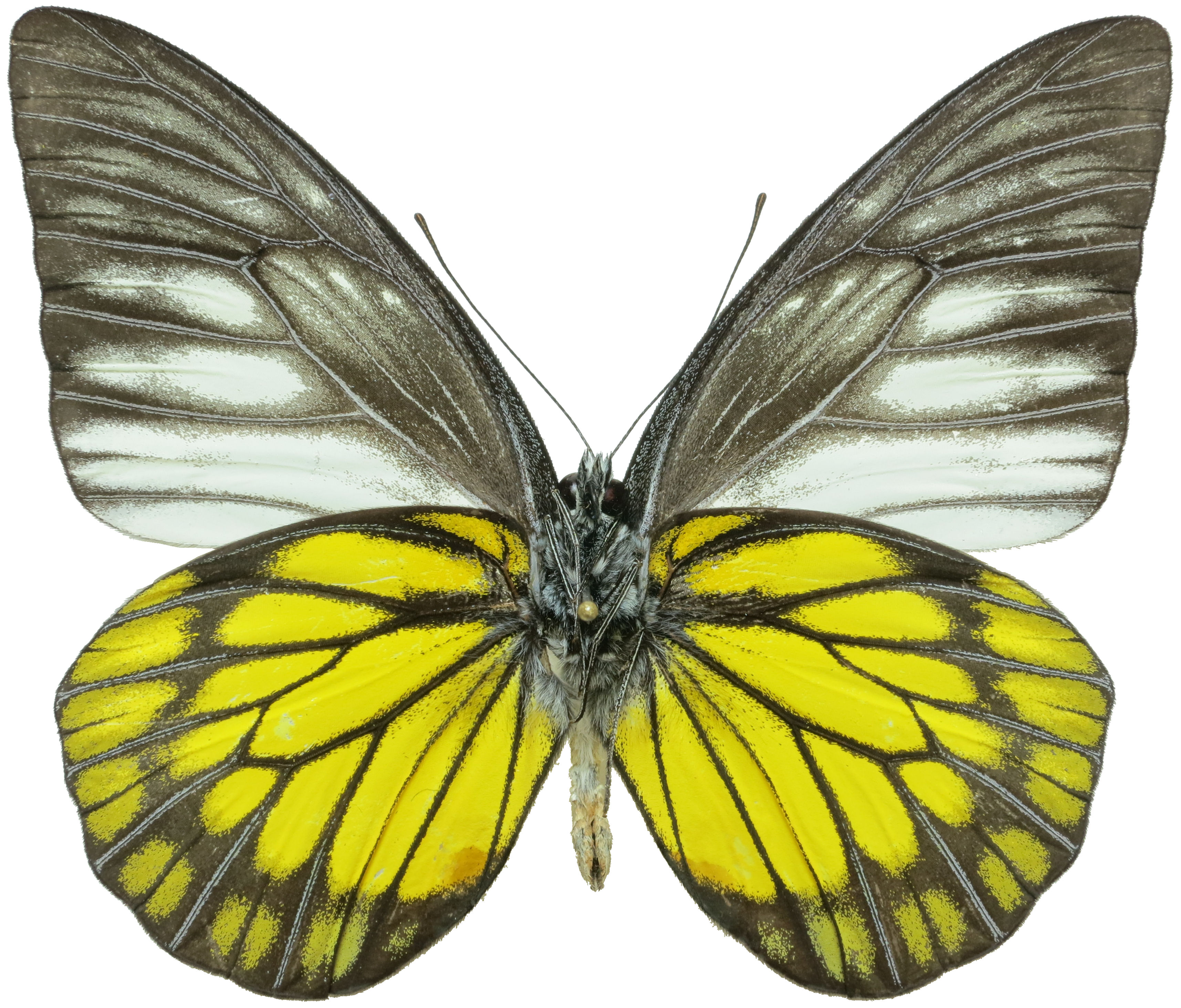
- Prioneris cornelia - Sabah, Malaysia

Scientific classification
- Kingdom: Animalia
- Phylum: Arthropoda
- Clade: Pancrustacea
- Class: Insecta
- Order: Lepidoptera
- Family: Pieridae
- Tribe: Pierini
- Genus: Prioneris; Wallace, 1867

Species
- See text.

= Prioneris =

Butterfly genus in family Pieridae

Prioneris is a genus of butterflies in the family Pieridae found in the Indomalayan realm.

== Species ==
- Prioneris autothisbe (Hübner, 1826)
- Prioneris clemanthe (Doubleday, 1846)
- Prioneris cornelia (van Vollenhoven, 1865)
- Prioneris hypsipyle Weymer, 1887
- Prioneris philonome (Boisduval, 1836)
- Prioneris sita (Felder, C & R Felder, 1865)
- Prioneris thestylis (Doubleday, 1842)
