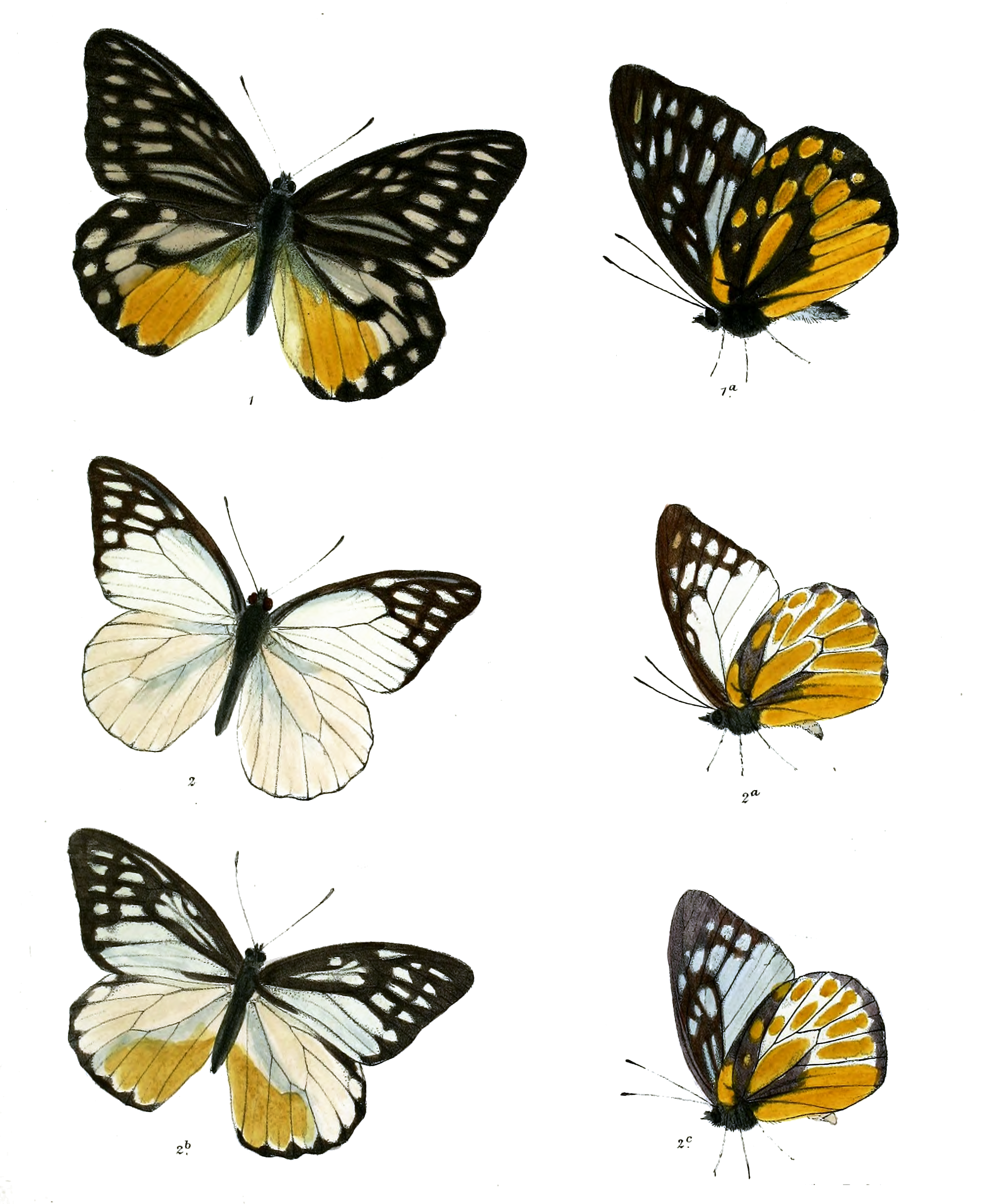
- Dry-season forms

Scientific classification
- Kingdom: Animalia
- Phylum: Arthropoda
- Clade: Pancrustacea
- Class: Insecta
- Order: Lepidoptera
- Family: Pieridae
- Genus: Prioneris
- Species: P. thestylis

Binomial name
- Prioneris thestylis Doubleday, 1842

= Prioneris thestylis =

Spotted sawtooth

Species of butterfly

Prioneris thestylis, the spotted sawtooth, is a small butterfly of the family Pieridae, that is, the yellows and whites, which is found in India and Southeast Asia.

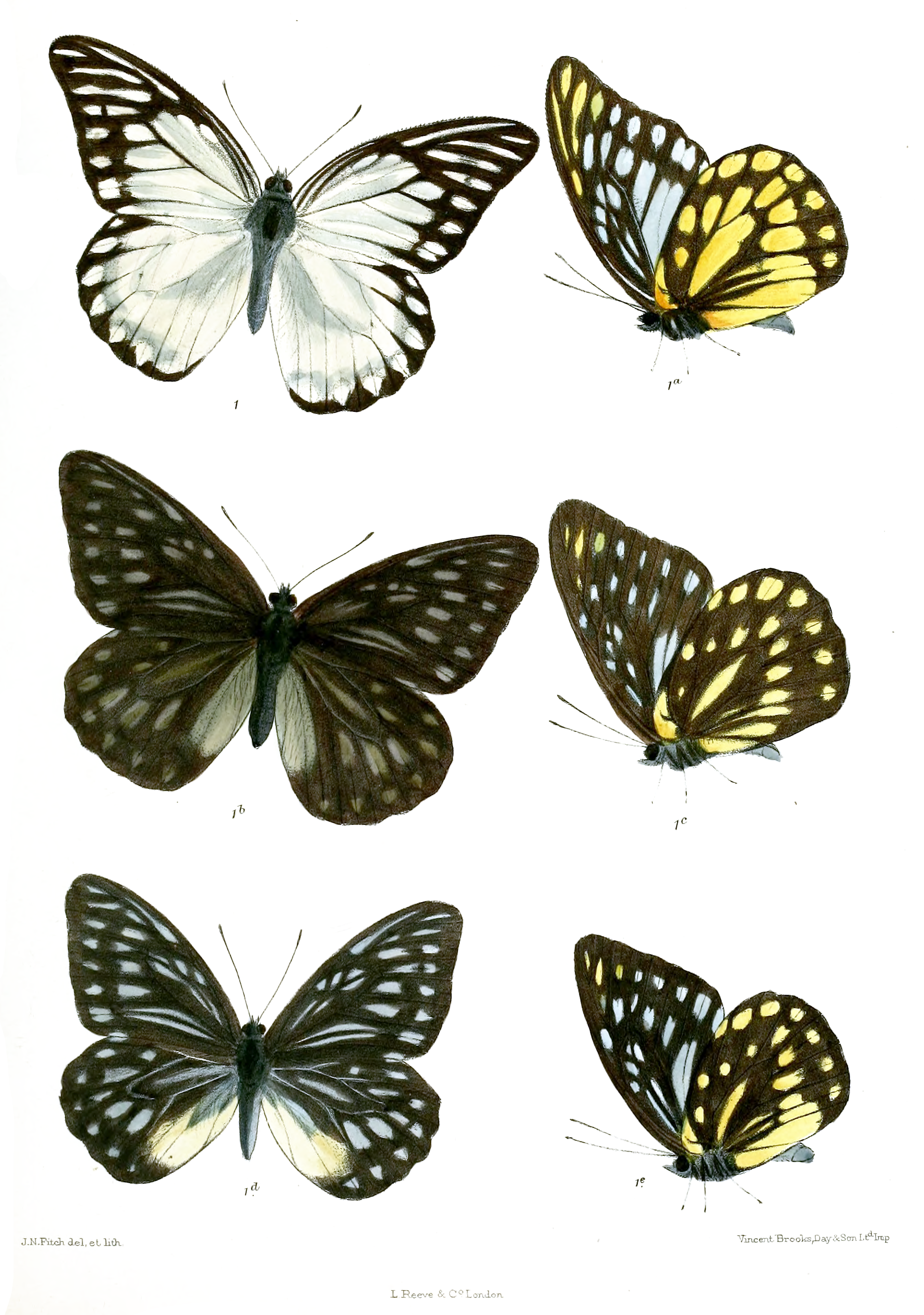
Wet-season forms

In Jayanti river bed, Buxa Tiger Reserve, West Bengal, India
