= Victor Victori =

South Korean artist (born 1943)

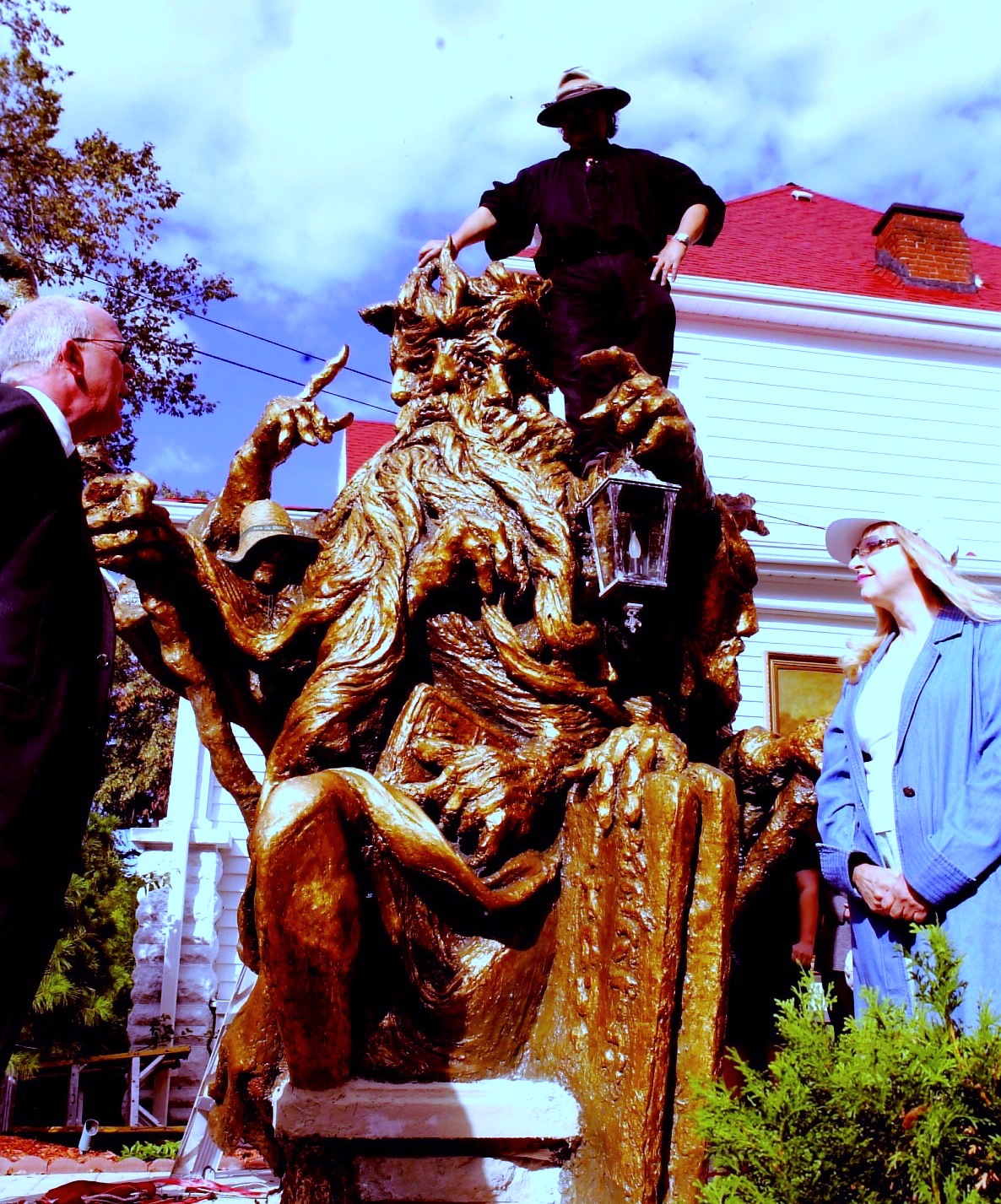
- Born: August 15, 1943 (age 83); South Korea
- Occupations: portraitist, painter and sculptor
- Website: www.victoribook.com

Victor Victori (born August 15, 1943) is a portraitist, painter, sculptor, author and ordained minister from South Korea. Victori immigrated to the U.S. in 1972 and took on his first project, a mural of all the past and up to date (1972) American presidents which currently resides in the White House Collection. After completing the "Presidential Mural," Victori travelled the country doing shows and exhibitions for 20 years from coast to coast. He married Maria Victori (born 1954) in 1981, and opened an Art gallery on 230 Park Avenue, New York City, NY. 1981~ 2000. Currently Victor Victori is retired and lives in Rutherford, New Jersey. He has five sons. Victori is most widely known for his style, "Multiplism," which he expresses in his work to depict the transcendence of mood, attitude and soul.

== Early life ==
Victor Victori (a.k.a.) Victorlee, Victori, was born on August 15, 1943. He was one of two boys in a family of 6 children. He grew up in rural South Korea outside of Seoul and began painting portraits as a child. His father was a mayor of a small town during the Korean War and was also a peach farmer. His father encouraged Victori to take over the farm, but Victori wanted to further his craft and enrolled in an art academy instead. After serving a few years in the Air Force, he left South Korea in 1969. When Victori left Korea he traveled through Europe to study its art from famous masters such as Rembrandt, Van Gogh, Da Vinci, Picasso and Michelangelo. During these travels Victori much of his skill was honed while living in the small art district in Paris — Montmartre and he slowly developed his own techniques in Paris. He moved to the America in 1972 and took on his first project, a presidential mural of all the American presidents which is now in the White House Collection. It was delivered to the Nixon White House in 1973 and remains there to this day. After completing the Presidential Mural Victori traveled the country doing shows and exhibitions for 20 years. During the 70's and 80's Victori traveled the country working mostly as a portrait artist doing various art shows, exhibitions, and private commissions. The speed Victori brought to his profession allowed him to set up a shop, gain clients in the double digits, produce finished portrait work, pack up and move onto a new city within a matter of days. Through the years of constant travelling and working, his identity fluctuated between celebrity status and starving artist. Once Victori decided some energy had to be shifted back towards his original work, he returned to the Northeast and opened a gallery on Park Avenue in New York City. The Park Avenue gallery, located in the east walkway of the Helmsley Building underpass, was home to private sittings, instructional painting classes, networking soirees as well as the birth of a few of Victori's original prized pieces. The space was eventually bought out due to eminent building renovation and Victori transitioned away from New York City. He married Maria Victori (born 1954), and opened an Art gallery on 230 Park avenue New York City, NY. 1981~ 2000. Currently Victor Victori is retired, and lives in Rutherford, New Jersey. He has five grown sons.

== Work ==
Over the course of forty years, Victori, painted portraits for Donald Trump, Ronald Reagan, and Senator Ted Kennedy among others and offered live sittings at his Park Avenue gallery. After creating approximately 30,000 oil paintings, Victori retired from portraits to experiment with a style of painting he had been developing since 1979, which he termed "multiplism". Unlike portraits, which portray a single moment, Victori's multiplist works combined the subject in many different positions and expressions in order to show change over time.

Trained at the Art Academy of Korea and community college in the US, Victori, emigrated to the United States in 1972 and became well known for his presidential portraits in the White House. He cites favorite painters including Rembrandt because of his "depth and technique" and mastery for portraits, and Baroque artist Peter Paul Rubens for his scale.

In 2010, Victor completed a lifelong dream to paint 10 Mona Lisas in the span of 24 hours. The Leader newspaper, a publication in the Meadowlands of New Jersey, documented the artistic ordeal.

The artist also released a book entitled "God and I" which takes the reader through his craft and the philosophical ideas that fuel it.

In September 2013, Victori unveiled a completed, 8-by-12-foot panel, commemorative painting of the tragedy that befell America on September 11, 2001. It was documented and reported on by a staff writer of Northjersey.com. Victori's career and experience in portrait work spanned much of his adult life, however he still managed to focus on developing a unique and divergent method of painting; a method that essentially layers what is seen in a single portrait and incites a deeper perception of his paintings' subjects. Having gazed upon so many thousands of faces during his career, Victori realized that a single instance of time frozen in a portrait hides the multiple moods, emotions, and states of mind concealed behind stationary, fixed expressions. "Multiplism", as he coined it, reveals the many behind the one, unfolding all possible dimensions of a being in one multi-faceted piece of work. Victori's advances into Multiplism have brought about paintings such as the "Many Faces of Mona" in which Da Vinci's iconic painting is transformed into a multiple-faced version of her former self. Victori began developing this style of art in the 1970s and continues to evolve its meaning and composition, not just through painting, but mural and sculpture work as well.

=== Paintings ===
Victori has never restricted his palette to accept only the finest oil paints. Among the entire portfolio some paintings have been created using materials such as enamels, acrylics, oils, gasoline, typical house paint or water colors. The mood of certain portraits require particular textures and thickness. The media range includes linen, canvas, panel, wood or glass. Victori's repertoire also includes murals, spanning as large as 20 x 20 feet. A few of them, originally constructed out of Masonite panels and painted outdoors, now cover the ceilings and walls of Victori's home, while a number of others were completed on the interior walls of many clients' homes. "The Circle of Life", a 15 x 20-foot mural, depicts hundreds of swirling naked bodies as they encircle a bright horizon. It has become one of Victori's signature works and is representative of his mastery as an artist.

American Presidents

Victori painted all 45 United States presidents' portraits, which are all in the Victori Museum collection. Former presidents Richard Nixon, Ronald Reagan and Donald Trump all were presented with their portraits. The White House has a mural depicting all the nation's presidents from Washington to Nixon—presented to the federal government one year after Victori moved to the United States from Paris in 1972. "This impressive work of art and the individual portraits you did of me and the Vice President are welcome additions to my collection of special memorabilia," Nixon said.

Source: North Jersey Media Group

Roman Emperors

Fascinated by world cultural, religious and political history, Victori got to work painting 400 years of Roman emperors. He painted Julius Caesar, Caligula Caesar, Nero, Claudius, Tiberius, Galba, Otho, Vitellius, Vespasian, Titus, Nerva, Maximilian, Constantine II, Justinian, and others.

Source: North Jersey Media Group

Mobsters

Al Capone, Frank Costello, Sam Giancano, Tommy Lucchese, John Gotti, Lucky Luciano, Paul Castellano, Carlo Gambino, Carmine Galante, Giuseppe Profaci and Vito Genevese portraits immortalize the crime bosses. These portraits by Victori were commissioned by a private collector. Source: North Jersey Media Group

Science and Astronomy

From the Big Bang to planet formations, Victori has traced the origins of the Universe and marveled at the infiniteness in his paintings. His vision of the stars, planets, supernovas, black holes and spectacular interstellar images are done in an array of colors set against a midnight black darkness—providing a perfect juxtaposition.

Source: North Jersey Media Group

Religion

Depicting the creation of mankind, Victori has painted hundreds key figures in major world religions, all done in his multiplism style. His scenes include Adam and Eve their descendants, scenes from Genesis, Noah, Jesus, Mary Magdaline, Saul, King David, Elijah, Ishmael, Abraham, and more.

=== Multiplism ===
Victori's specific style, dubbed by journalists and art enthusiasts alike as a new school of art, is called Multiplism. In essence, this artistic approach highlights the many behind the one, unfolding all possible dimensions of a being in one all-inclusive piece of work. This style of art was created in the late 70's. The purpose of the multiplism technique is to capture the motion of life. Multiplism is the simultaneous image of the subjects various consequential movements or to depict the shifts in emotion expressed by an individual. The intent of the artist is to display a moving painting.

=== Sculptures ===
Victori uses an unconventional medium for his sculptures by mixing concrete and sand into a mortar. Early in his sculpting career clay was the preferred medium, but clay is relatively more expensive and too fragile to create large works to be displayed outdoors. The concrete mix would allow for the malleability of clay and upon drying would have more permanence as a building block. One of Victori's largest scale projects of the past decade is an 11-foot high 10,000-pound sculpture named "Minds of Moses" that rests on the property of Victori's corner home depicting the many sides of the religious figure. Alongside the sculpture are 3 slightly smaller cement statues of Zeus, Jesus, and Buddha. The completion of these pieces spurred much local news coverage for the artist and he has since added various other abstract pieces to the outdoor collection. Most notable sculpture models have been Moses, Jesus, Zeus, and Buddha, all measuring at over 9 & 11'.

Moses

In 2006, Victori unveiled his "Minds of Moses" colossal statue. The roughly 16-foot high artwork is composed of 120 80-lb bags of cement and took two years to complete. During this time, curious onlookers often stopped by to watch the artist at work. The sculpture work brings Victori's multiplism into a 3-D effect. Source: northjersey.com

Dana Rapisardi of The Leader newspaper in the Meadowlands profiled Victori's unveiling of his front-lawn sculpture.

The unveiling was an enormous community event in Rutherford, New Jersey, where Victori lives. The semi-permanent installation gained statewide notoriety on local news networks, periodicals and cult catalogs like Weird N.J. citing Victori under the local heroes and artists page as the creator of the "Multiplism Moses" sculpture, issue 31, page 72.

God & I

The "God & I" statue is centerpiece and last creation of the sculpture garden. The seventh installment in the garden series of sculptures at the artist's home is titled, "God and I." It is the most elaborate sculpture of the garden. It has been publicly reported on since the initial base structure was formed out of 200 bags of concrete. This was a hint that the largest of the garden collection was about to take form. Construction started in April 2013 and is expected to be completed by the summer of 2015, standing at 20 feet tall, weighing in at 40,000 lbs. The base alone took 200 bags of concrete. The statue weighs 40,000 lbs. The artist put in a column base for support. The physical exertion took its toll on Victori, who once feel from the roughly 18-foot statue as he was creating it. Victori incorporated his fall into the statue, added the image of man descending down the base. The statue pays homage to Victori's appreciation of history of religion and philosophy, interspersed with astronomy—including small planets, the Earth and moon. At the top of the statue, God's head includes glaring eyes and varied expressions. Next to the statue are the Buddha, Jesus and Zeus statues. Source: North Jersey Media Group

== Documentary ==
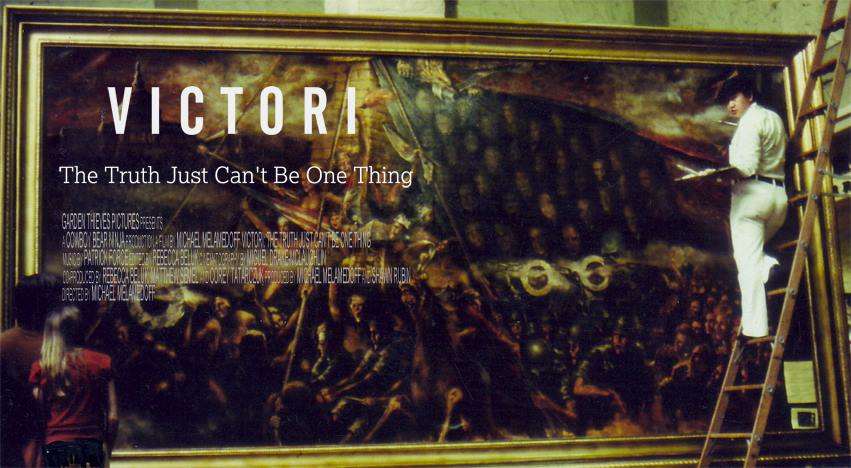
Victori – The Truth Just Can't Be One Thing, Released 2015

Victori is the focus of a feature-length documentary which explores decades of paintings as well as the new career path of his son Ed Victori, who has taken on the management of his entire oeuvre. The film was produced and directed by Michael Melamedoff, and takes place in early 2012. The film was released for on-line distribution and premiered in New York City at Anthology Film Archives in April 2015.

The film follows 25-year-old risk management analyst Ed Victori leaves his job in finance to start managing the art career of his father, Victor Victori. A career portrait painter who has made his living in American malls, Korean born Victor is determined to share 'Multiplism,' a form of post-modern art he claims is wholly original. As Ed begins to prep his father's work for exposition he discovers that the insular culture of family is separate from the exclusive culture of the art world.

Examiner.com says of the film "4 Stars. This is a must for all art lovers", while The Boston Globe reports "Exploring the fine line between kitsch and genius, Melamedoff's dead pan doc outmocks some of the best of Christopher Guest.

The Film "VICTORI: THE TRUTH JUST CAN'T BE ONE THING" has a public trailer on www.victorimovie.com and is the full film is available on Amazon Prime, Amazon and iTunes.

== Present ==
Victori continues working, building, and creating, perhaps at a quicker pace than ever. He currently works out of two private studios located in northern New Jersey where he focuses on expanding his anthology of paintings, murals, and sculpture of varying scale. He is father to five grown sons and lives with his wife, Maria.

Recently Victori has been making paintings on wooden panels and stitched burlap scrolls, exploring existential themes and forces beyond human comprehension. These works are often composed of multiple sections and can be as large as 18 feet high and over 20 feet long, giving a sense of how vast and mysterious the universe is.
