= Delias madetes =

- In Seitz

Scientific classification
- Kingdom: Animalia
- Phylum: Arthropoda
- Clade: Pancrustacea
- Class: Insecta
- Order: Lepidoptera
- Family: Pieridae
- Genus: Delias
- Species: D. madetes

Binomial name
- Delias madetes (Godman & Salvin, 1878

Synonyms
- Pieris madetes Godman & Salvin, 1878 whitish instead of yellowish spots on the under surface, likewise whitish strigae of the forewing and reduced submarginal spots on the hindwing beneath.; Delias honrathi Mitis, 1893

Species of butterfly

Delias madetes is a butterfly in the family Pieridae.It was described by Frederick DuCane Godman and Osbert Salvin in 1878. It is found in the Australasian realm.

D. madetes Godm. & Salv. (53 a) is clearly proved by its under surface to belong to the descombesi-group and is one of the most attractive species of the genus. The upper surface of the male resembles that of aruna. Female above black with the orange-coloured discocellular patch which also occurs in aruna and 6 whitish submarginal spots. The central part and the inner margin of the hindwing dirty yellowish white. The distal margin broadly black, enclosing 6 washed-out yellowish patches. New Mecklenburg. The wingspan is about 75–85 mm.

== Subspecies ==
- Delias madetes madetes (New Ireland)
- Delias madetes honrathi Mitis, 1893 (New Britain)
- Delias madetes neohannoverana Rothschild, 1915 (New Hanover)
