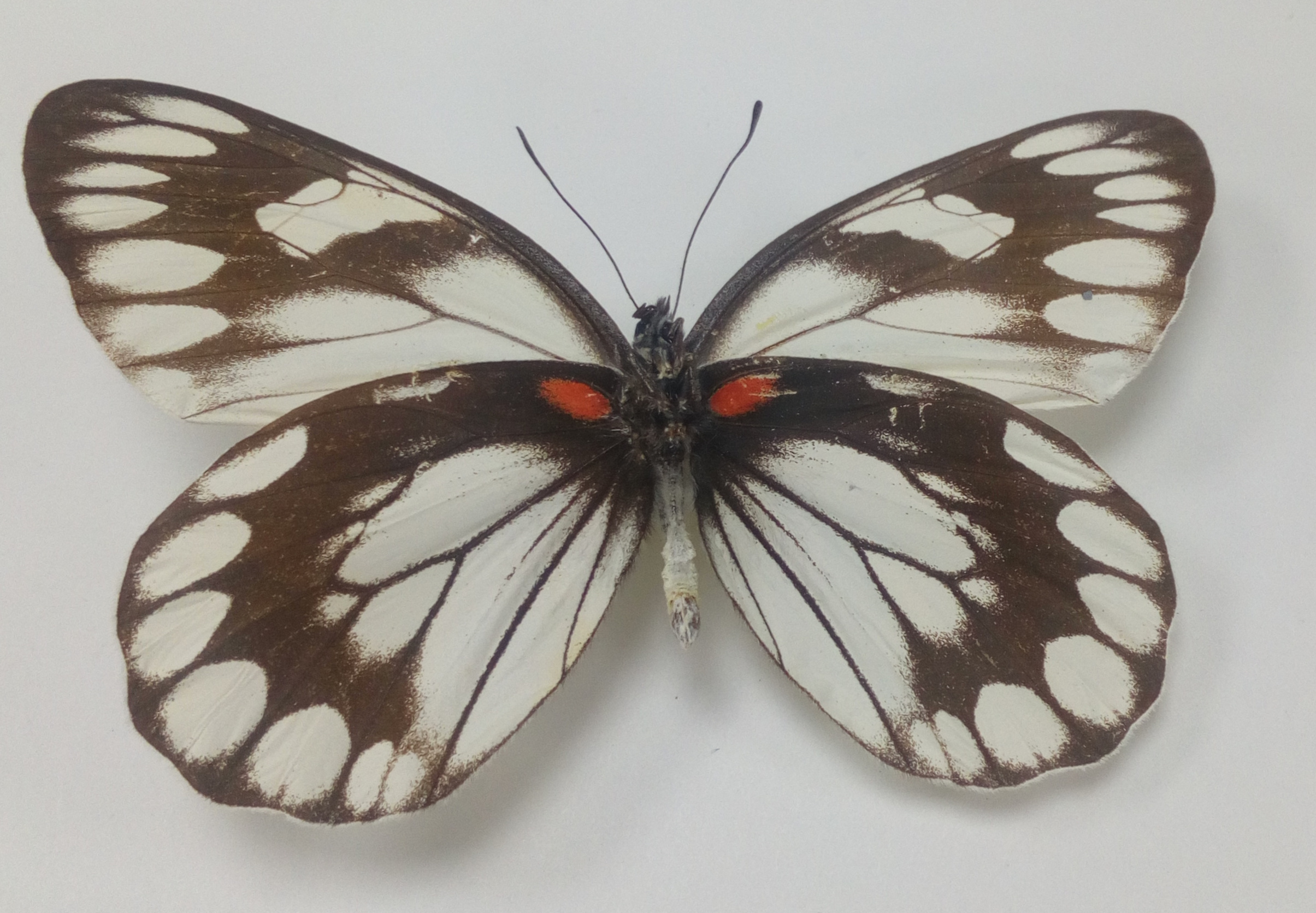

Scientific classification
- Kingdom: Animalia
- Phylum: Arthropoda
- Clade: Pancrustacea
- Class: Insecta
- Order: Lepidoptera
- Family: Pieridae
- Genus: Delias
- Species: D. diaphana

Binomial name
- Delias diaphana Semper, 1878

Synonyms
- Delias morishitai Nakano, 1993

= Delias diaphana =

Species of butterfly

Delias diaphana is a species of pierine butterfly endemic to the Philippines, where it is found only on Mindanao.

== Description ==
D. diaphana Semper. above scarcely distinguishable from descombesi, but beneath entirely black with abnormally large cell-spot on the forewing and similarly large submarginal patches on both wings.Upper surface of the forewing yellowish with black discocellular and black distal margin with yellow spots; hindwing white with whitish submarginal patches. The under surface with broad black postdiscal bands on both wings. A magnificent, large species.

The wingspan is 80–90 mm.

== Subspecies ==
- Delias diaphana diaphana (Mt. Apo, Mindanao)
- Delias diaphana sagaguchii Tsukada & Nishiyama, 1980 (Masara Maine, south-eastern Mindanao)
- Delias diaphana basilisae Schroder, 1893 (Mt.Malindang-Zamboanga, western Mindanao)
- Delias diaphana yatai Nakano, 1993 (Tandag, north-eastern Mindanao)
