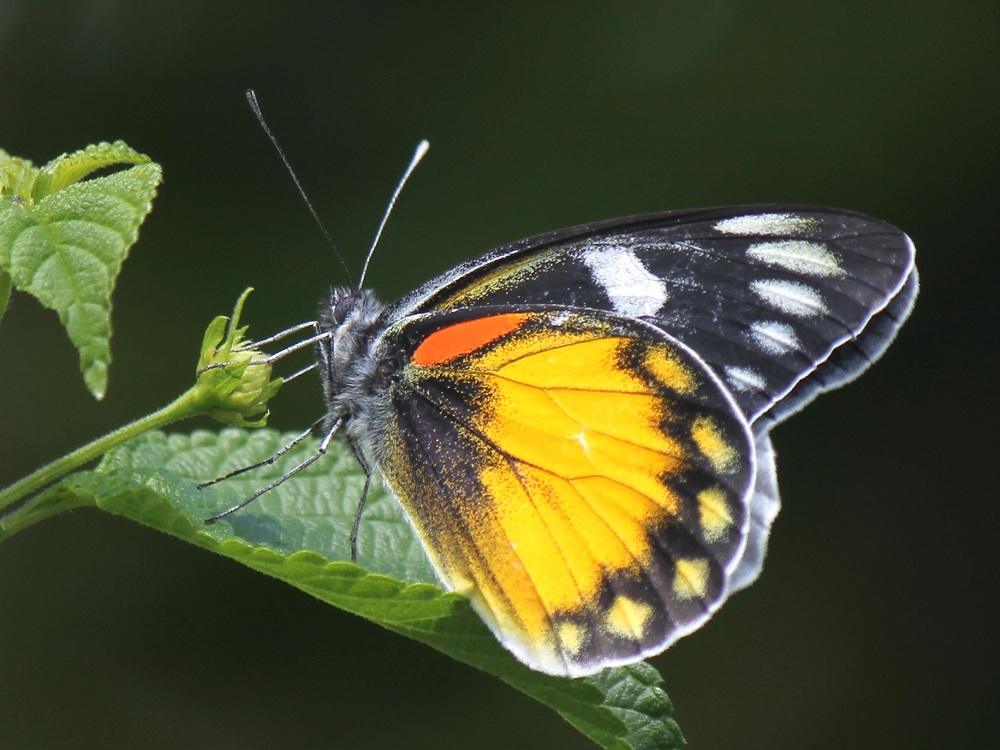
- Male
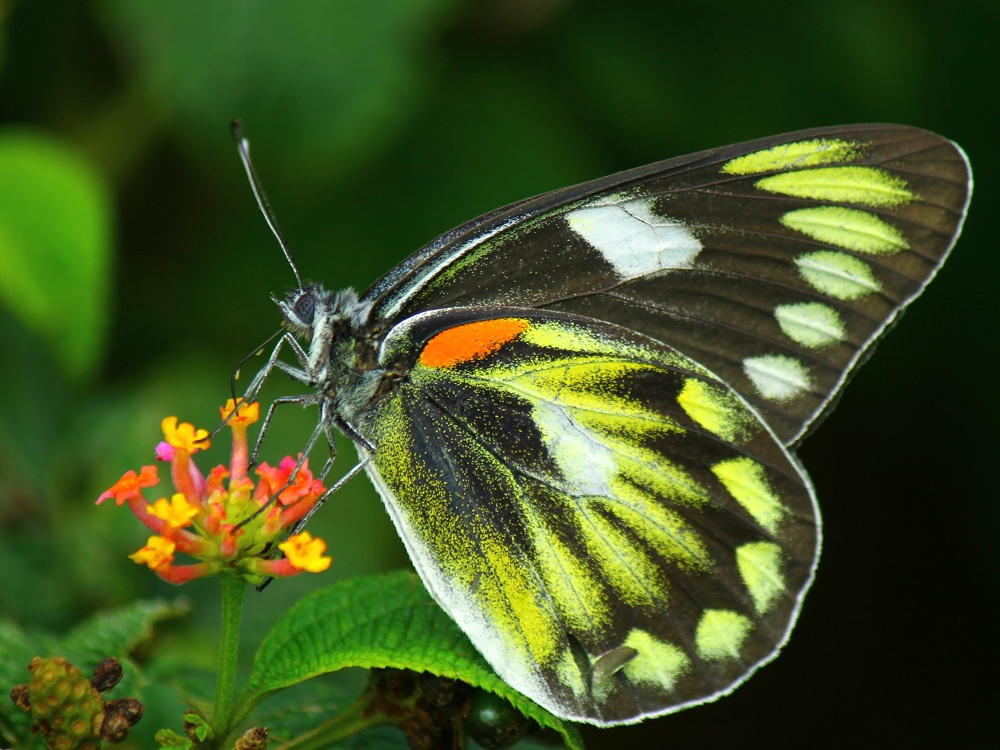
- Female

Scientific classification
- Kingdom: Animalia
- Phylum: Arthropoda
- Class: Insecta
- Order: Lepidoptera
- Family: Pieridae
- Genus: Delias
- Species: D. zebuda

Binomial name
- Delias zebuda (Hewitson, 1862)

Synonyms
- Pieris zebuda Hewitson, 1862

= Delias zebuda =

Species of butterfly

Delias zebuda is a butterfly in the family Pieridae. It was described by William Chapman Hewitson in 1862. It is found in the Australasian realm (Celebes, Ternate, Menado).

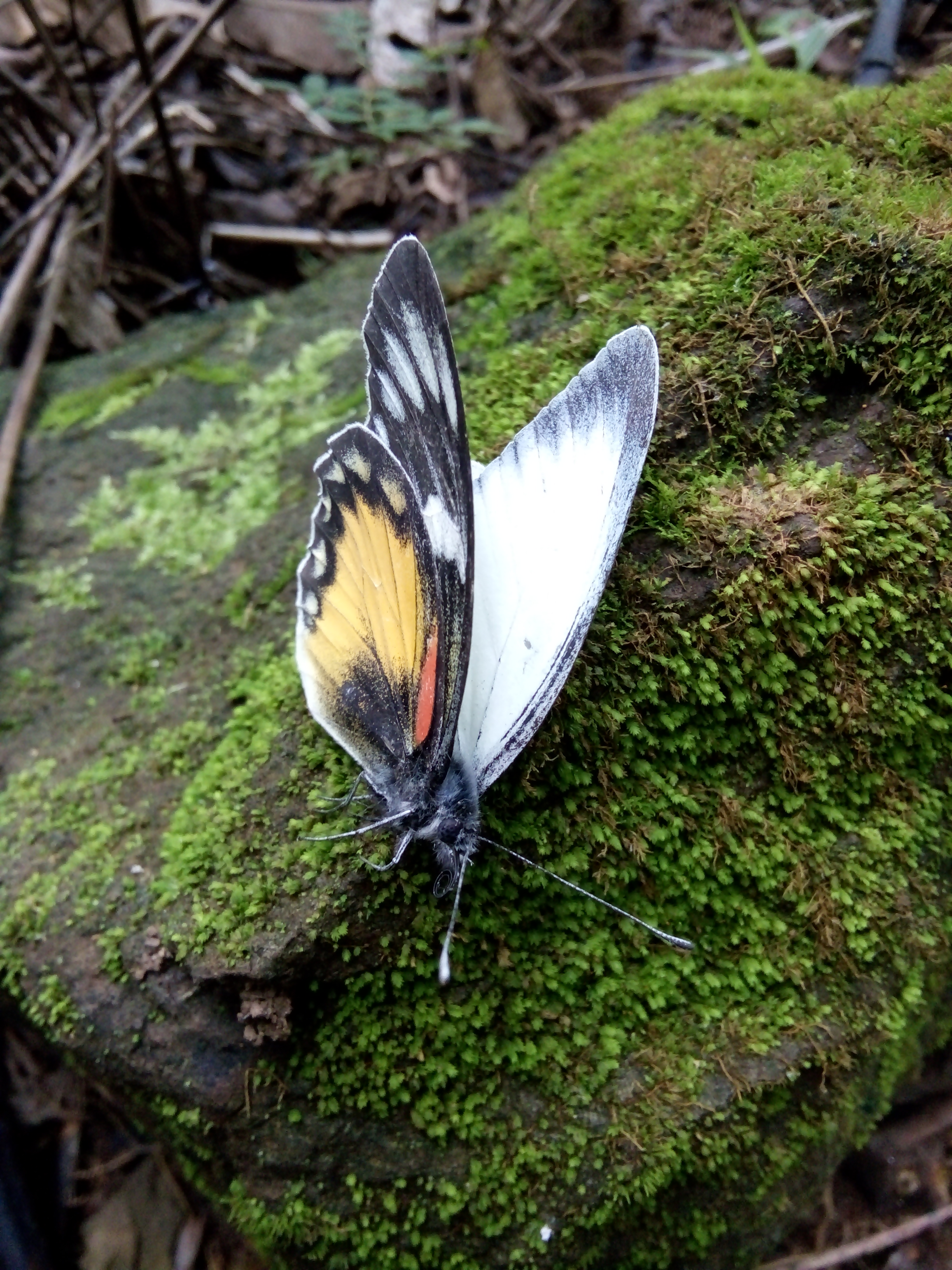
Male (Sungai Pontolo, North Gorontalo)

== Description ==
Original Upperside. Male, white; anterior wing elongated at the apex as in P. Thestylis and Nero, with the costal margin, the apex (broadly), and the outer margin to nearly the anal angle, dark grey: the nervures black where they join the outer margin. Posterior wing with the outer margin of a paler grey. Underside. Anterior wing from the base nearly to the middle (except the centre of the cell which is black) light grey and green, followed by dark brown paler towards the apex and crossed by a curved band of seven oblong pale yellow and white spots: at the end of the cell an oblique oblong white spot. Posterior wing orange-yellow; the base and the costal and outer margins dark brown: a submarginal band of six yellow spots: an oblong scarlet spot at the base of the costal margin.

Female, upperside grey- or green-brown; both wings with a white spot at the end of the cell, both crossed near the outer margin by a curved band of six indistinct grey- or green-white spots. Underside as in the male, except that there is no grey at the base of the anterior wing, and that the centre of the posterior wing is yellow, deeply intersected outwardly with black. Expan. 84 in. Hab. Menado. In the Collections of W. W. Saunders and W. C. Hewitson.
