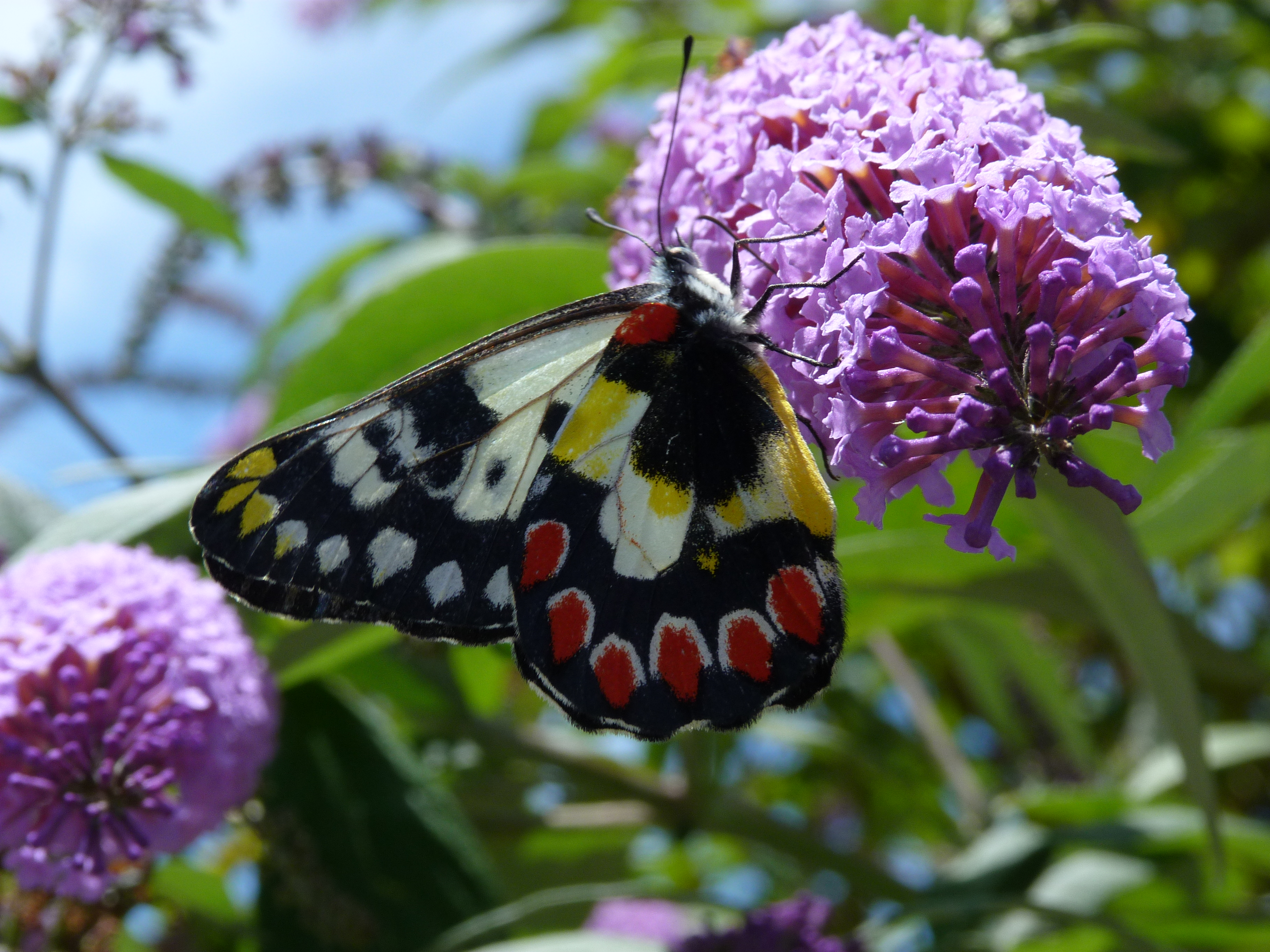
- Delias aganippe. Sideview

Scientific classification
- Kingdom: Animalia
- Phylum: Arthropoda
- Class: Insecta
- Order: Lepidoptera
- Family: Pieridae
- Genus: Delias
- Species: D. aganippe

Binomial name
- Delias aganippe (Donovan, 1805)

Synonyms
- Papilio aganippe Donovan, E. 1805

= Delias aganippe =

Species of butterfly

Delias aganippe, the wood white or red-spotted Jezebel, is a butterfly in the family Pieridae.

== General Description ==
The Red Spotted Jezebel (Delias aglaia) is a striking butterfly known for its vibrant and contrasting coloration. The upper side of the forewings is predominantly black with a white band, which appears grey in males and cream in females . The underside of the hindwings showcases bright red and yellow spots . Notably, the hindwings are without tails, and the butterfly features clubbed antennae. With a wingspan reaching up to 7 cm, this butterfly is both conspicuous and visually captivating . Delias aganippe can reach a wingspan of about 60–70 mm (2.4–2.8 in) . The upper surface of the wings shows a silver-grey colour, with black margins and a row of white spots. Moreover, the females have a round black spot in the middle of the forewings. In both sexes, the underside of the hindwings shows large yellow patches and subterminal bands of red spots

== Biology ==
Red Spotted Jezebels are most commonly observed during the summer months. Their life cycle is closely linked to mistletoe plants, on which they breed . Males are known to patrol the tallest trees on hills and ridges, awaiting the emergence of females to mate . The eggs are laid in clusters, and the caterpillars exhibit gregarious behaviour in their early stages, feeding together on mistletoe leaves during the day. As they mature, the caterpillars become more solitary. The pupae, or cocoons, have a distinctive appearance, resembling bird droppings, which likely serves as a protective camouflage against predators . Behaviour

Adult Red Spotted Jezebels exhibit a gliding flight with wings fully outspread, interspersed with a series of relatively short yet rapid wing beats; this flight pattern is somewhat faster than that of other Jezebel species . They are frequently observed feeding on the flowers of eucalypts and their mistletoe host plants. Males are known to congregate on hilltops where they fly high and patrol the canopy of the tallest trees. At least two generations are completed annually in southeastern Australia . Adults are migratory, although their movement patterns are complex and not entirely understood. In certain years, adults reach northeastern Queensland but do not breed or only breed temporarily . The typical habitats include eucalypt open-forest and woodland, and mallee woodland, particularly in lower rainfall areas where their larval food plants grow as parasitic trees or mistletoes .

== Distribution ==
This species is endemic to Australia. These butterflies can be found mainly in southern Queensland, New South Wales, Victoria, South Australia, and in southern Western Australia. Generally common and widespread, less abundant in coastal areas of Queensland and ne. New South Wales .

== Habitat ==
The Red Spotted Jezebel thrives in a wide range of habitats where mistletoe plants are present. These habitats include wet heathlands, mallee, woodlands, dry forests, wet forests, grasslands, and even urban areas .

== Variation ==
Two seasonal forms

== Larval Food Plants ==
A. linophylla, A. miquelii, A. preissii, A. quandang, E. strictus, Santalum acuminatum, S. lancelolatum, S. spicatum .

== More Information ==
• Animal Type: Butterflies & moths • Animal SubType: Whites & Jezebels • Brief Id: The bright red spots in its name can be found on the underside of the hindwing, along with splashes of yellow. • Colours: Brown, Black, White, Yellow, Red • Maximum Size: 7 cm • Habitats: Wetland, Urban, DryForest, WetForest, Woodland, Mallee, Grassland • Diet: Nectar • Endemicity: Native to Australia • Commercial: No • Conservation Statuses: o CITES: Not listed o FFG Threatened List: Not listed o DSE Advisory List: Not listed o IUCN Red List: Not listed • Plants: Mistletoe vines • Flight Start: August • Flight End: May

== Taxonomy ==
• Kingdom: Animalia • Phylum: Arthropoda • Subphylum: Hexapoda • Class: Insecta • Subclass: Pterygota • Superorder: Endopterygota • Order: Lepidoptera • Suborder: Ditrysia • Superfamily: Papilionoidea • Family: Pieridae • Subfamily: Pierinae • Genus: Delias • Species: Delias aglaia • Scientific Author: (Donovan, 1805) • Common Names: Red-spotted Jezebel Butterfly, Wood White, Wood White Butterfly, Spotted Jezebel

== Distribution ==
This species is endemic to Australia. These butterflies can be found mainly in southern Queensland, New South Wales, Victoria, South Australia, and in the southern Western Australia.

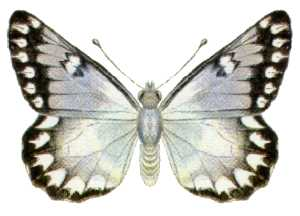
Male of Delias aganippe. Mounted specimen

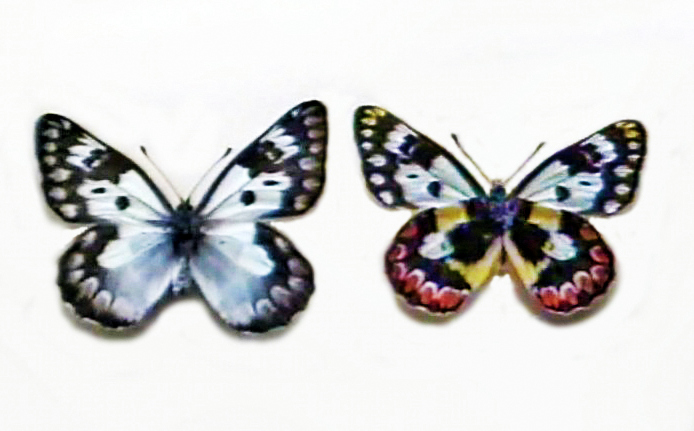
Female of Delias aganippe. Upper and under sides

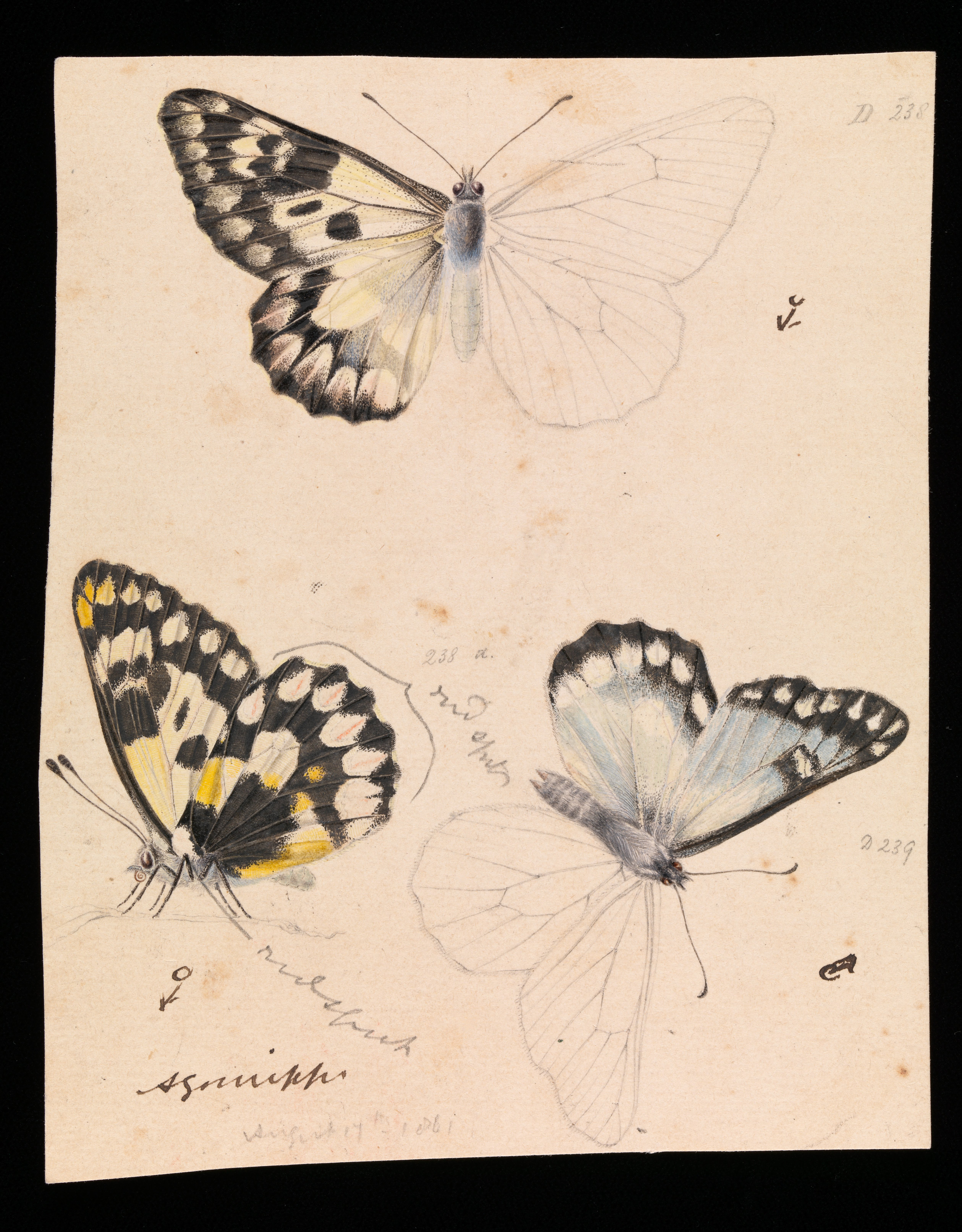
Illustration of Wood White Butterfly

== Biology ==
The caterpillars can reach a body length of about 4 cm (1.6 in). They are at first pale brown with a black head, then they become completely black, with small white spots. They feed gregariously on Santalaceae (Exocarpos, Santalum species) and Loranthaceae species (Amyema species).
