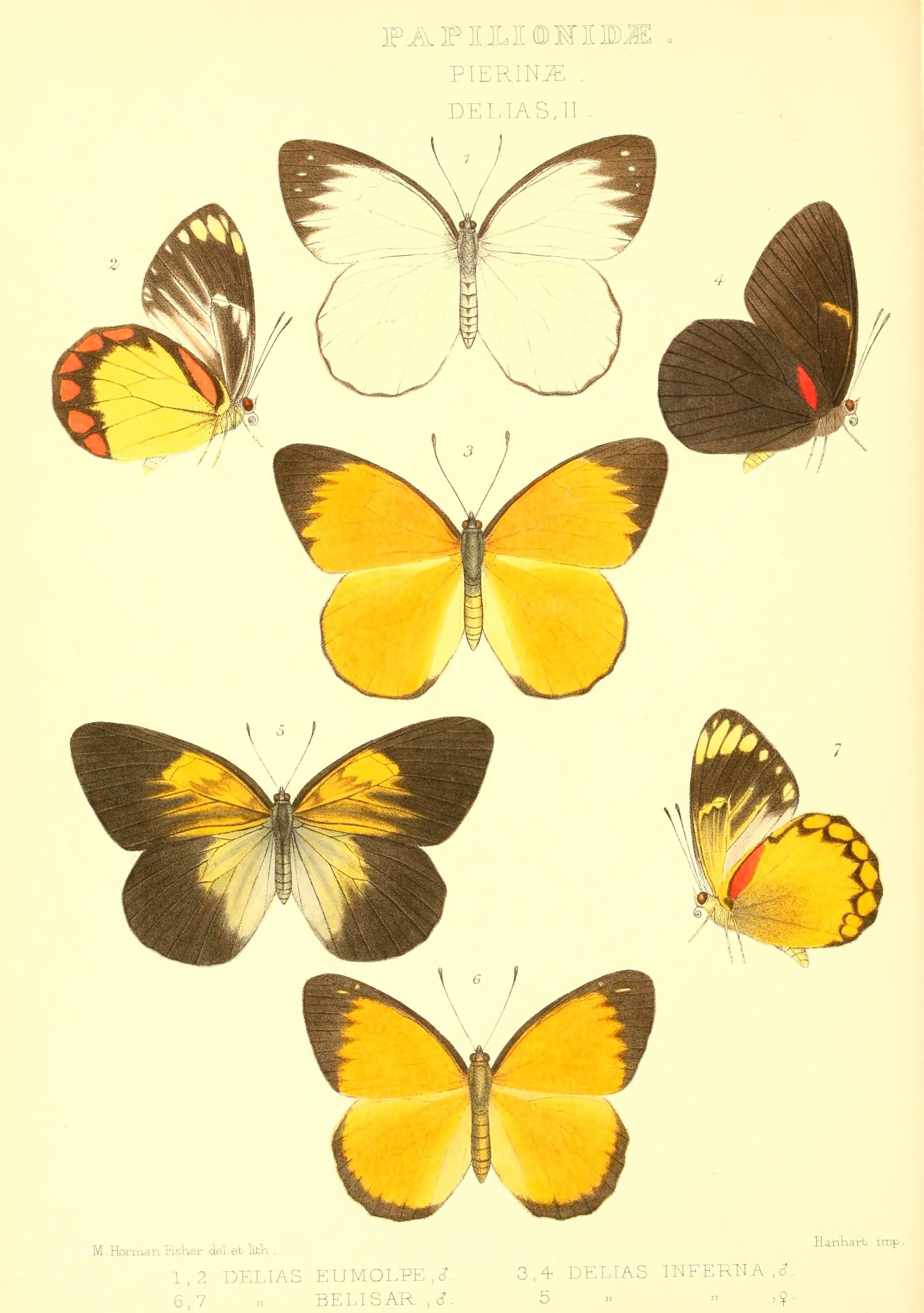
- D. a. inferna figs.3,4 (male), 5 female

Scientific classification
- Kingdom: Animalia
- Phylum: Arthropoda
- Clade: Pancrustacea
- Class: Insecta
- Order: Lepidoptera
- Family: Pieridae
- Genus: Delias
- Species: D. aruna

Binomial name
- Delias aruna (Boisduval, 1832)

Synonyms
- Pieris aruna Boisduval, 1832; Pieris bajura Boisduval, 1832; Delias inferna Butler, 1871; Delias aruna arovana Fruhstorfer, 1913

= Delias aruna =

Golden Jezebel

Species of butterfly

Delias aruna, the golden Jezebel, is a butterfly in the family Pieridae. It is found in Queensland, Irian Jaya, Maluku, Papua New Guinea and several surrounding islands.

== Description ==
Sexually dimorphic.The male upper ground colour is yellow to orange.The forewing apex is black apex and there is a narrow black band marginal hindwing band.The female is black, with an orange basal area and obscure orange apical spots. The undersides of both sexes are dark brown. The male has a yellow forewing patch and a scarlet mark near the base of each hindwing. The female has arcs of yellow spots around the margin of the undersides of all wings. Both sexes have wingspans of c. 7 cms. D aruna is very variable across its large range.

== Subspecies ==
- Delias aruna aruna (northern Moluccas, Waigeu, West Irian to northern New Guinea) light yellow basal region on the hindwing above.
- Delias aruna irma Fruhstorfer, 1907 (Papua (Milne Bay)) the darkest known race; male beneath almost entirely black, also above with broader margins than inferna.
- Delias aruna inferna Butler, 1871 (Cape York to Coen) - orange Jezabel in the female above no yellow transverse spot at the discocellular of the forewing, which, however, appears again beneath. very similar to irma.
- Delias aruna rona Rothschild, 1898(Roon Island)
- Delias aruna seriata ( Bachan, Obi, Halmahera, Kasiruta and Gebi islands).
- Delias aruna arovana Fruhstorfer, H. 1913 (Rossel and Sud-Est islands)
- Delias aruna rana Swinhoe, 1916 (Ambon Island)
- Delias aruna sarera Yagishita, 1994 (Manawi, Yapen Island)
- form madala Fruhstorfer, 1907 (German New Guinea) Distal margin narrow, the ground-colour above orange, whilst on the under surface the red costal and discal spot are considerably larger and hence the black distal margin is reduced.
- form bajura (Waigeu) pale yellow basal part of the hindwing above;sharply defined and narrower white transverse spot before the cell of the forewing.

== Biology ==
They fly singly, mostly met with in July in open woods. The butter¬ flies are fond of visiting the flowers of Syzygium jambos, on which they have been found even at elevations of 1000 ft.

== Gallery ==

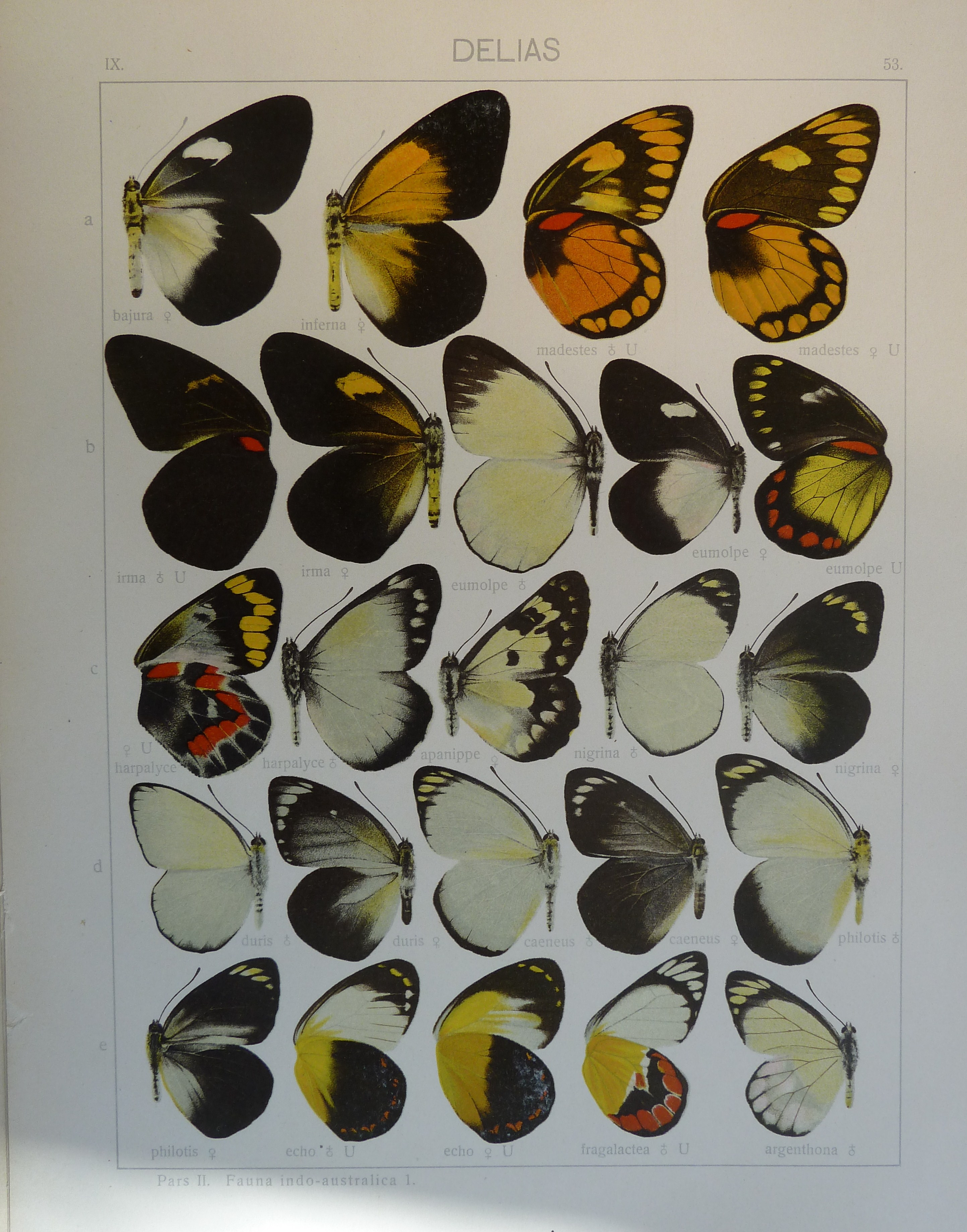
