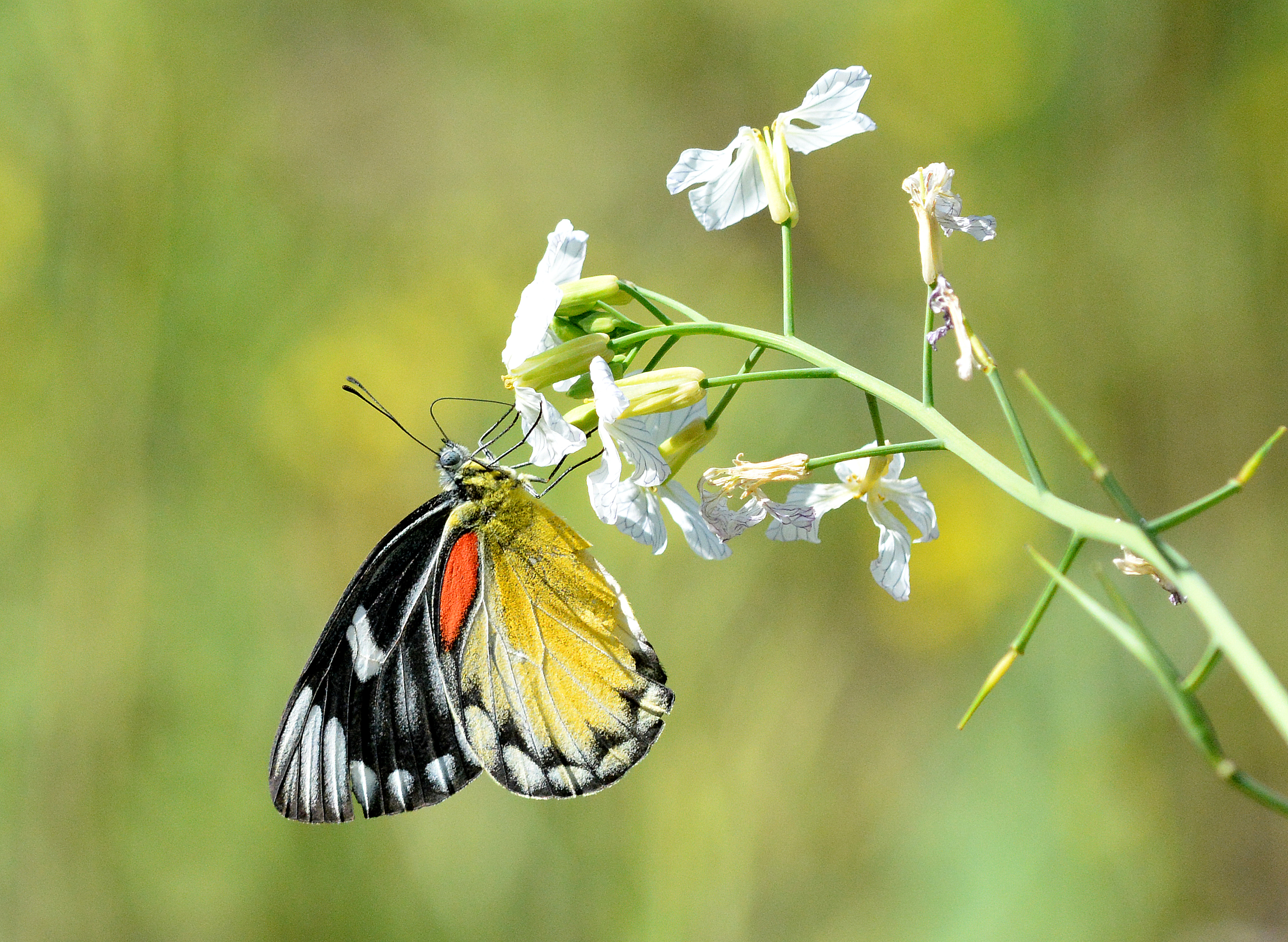
- feeding

Scientific classification
- Kingdom: Animalia
- Phylum: Arthropoda
- Class: Insecta
- Order: Lepidoptera
- Family: Pieridae
- Genus: Delias
- Species: D. descombesi

Binomial name
- Delias descombesi Boisduval, 1836

= Delias descombesi =

Redspot Jezebel

Species of butterfly

Delias descombesi, the redspot Jezebel is a medium-sized butterfly of the family Pieridae, that is, the yellows and whites.

== Description ==
=== Male ===
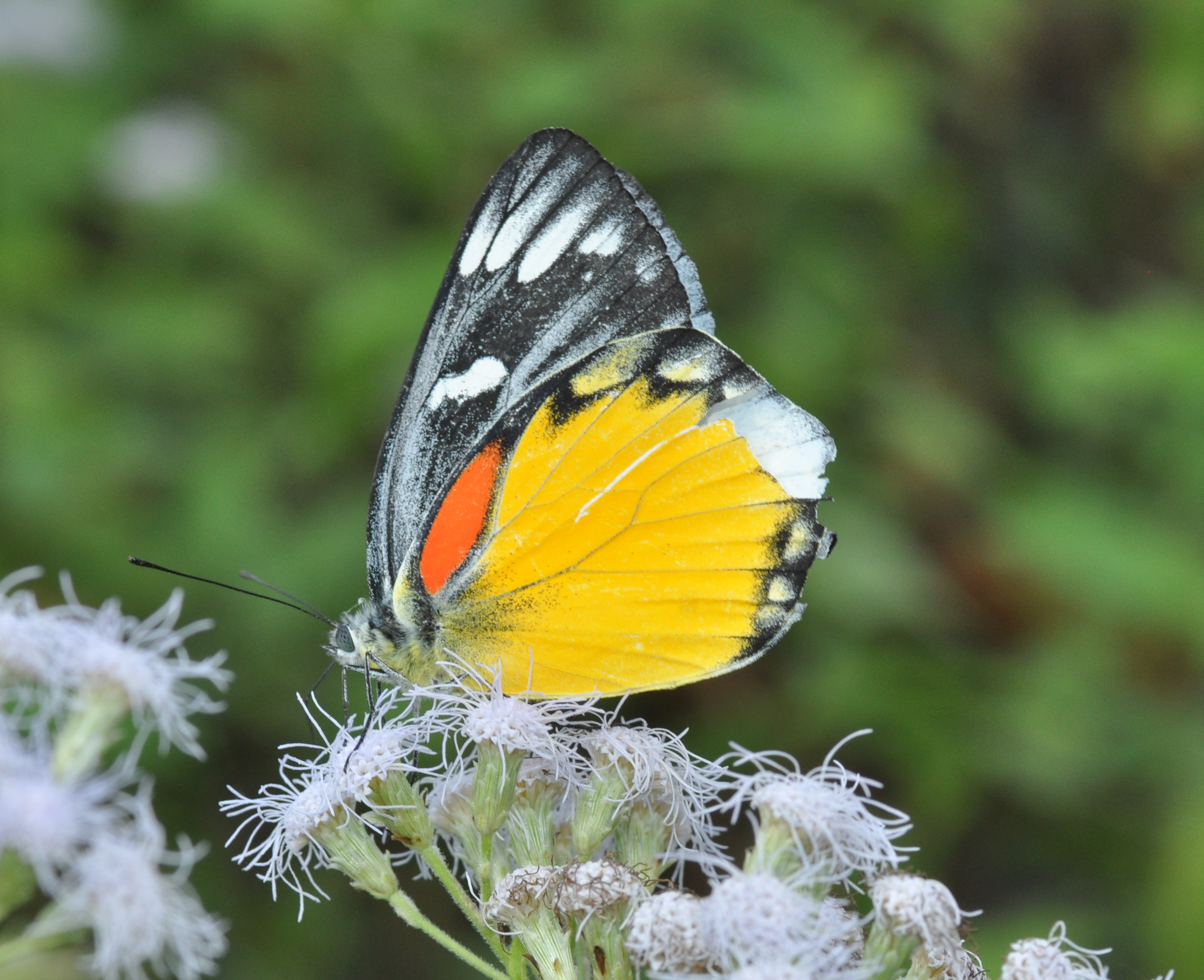
In Buxa Tiger Reserve, Alipurduar, West Bengal, India

Upperside: opaque white. Forewing: costa and terminal margin very narrowly black; extreme base, apex broadly and termen submarginally more or less thickly irrorated (sprinkled) with black scales, the width of this blackish border decreases posteriorly along the termen. Hindwing: termen narrowly black, the black markings of the underside show dusky bluish through transparency.

Underside, forewings: black; an obliquely placed short broad bar along the discocellulars and a subterminal series of outwardly pointed spots, of which the anterior three lengthen into streaks, white; the anterior and posterior margins of the cell and broad streaks, that do not reach the terminal margin, on each side of veins 1 to 4, grey. Hindwing: rich chrome yellow; costa and termen broadly black; interspaces 1 to 7 with outwardly pointed, broadly triangular, yellowish-white diffuse spots on the black terminal margin, the black on the inner side of these spots produced conically inwards; the black in interspace 7 centred with an elongate, outwardly somewhat diffuse, oval vermilion streak.

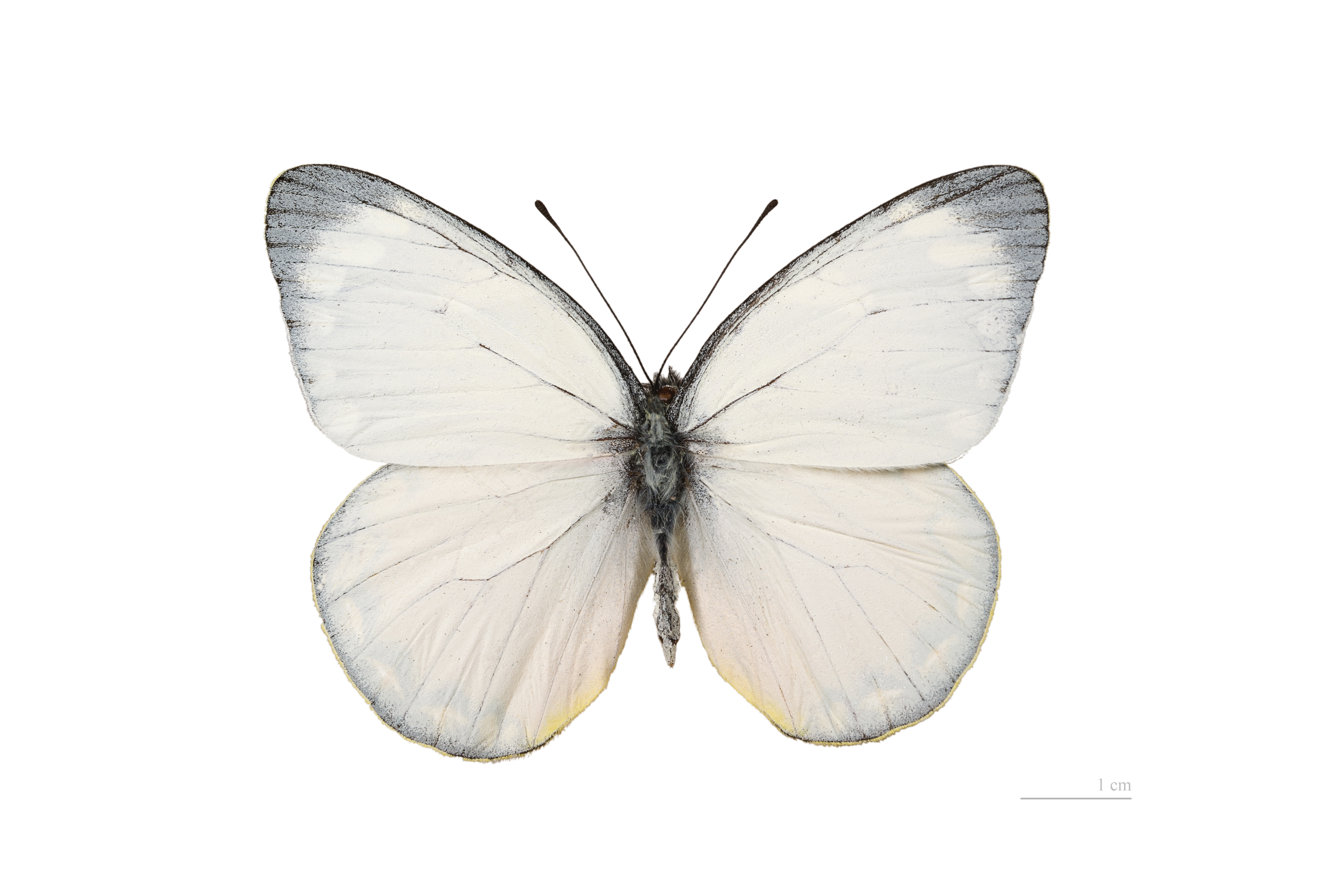
Male, dorsal side

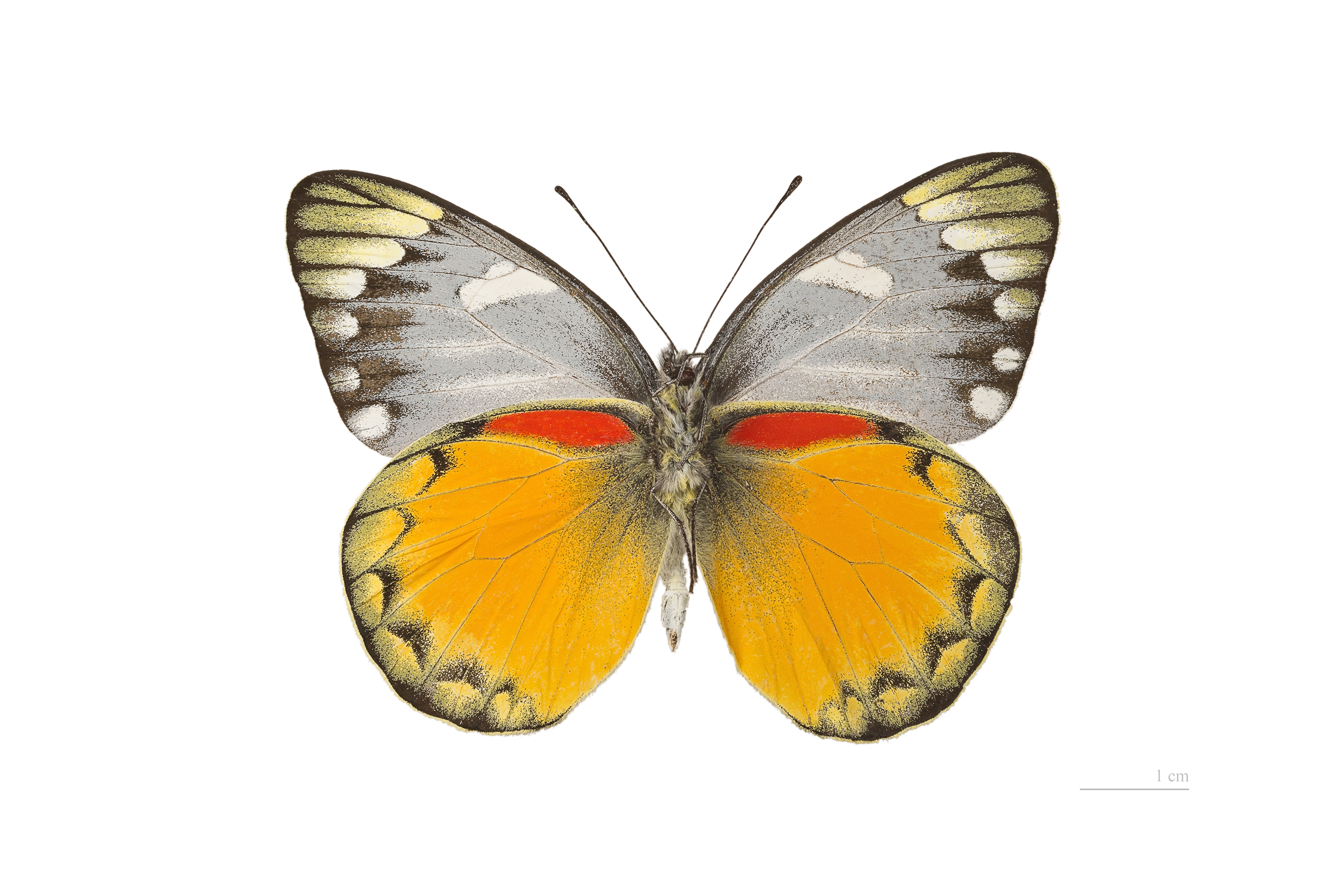
Male, ventral side

=== Female ===
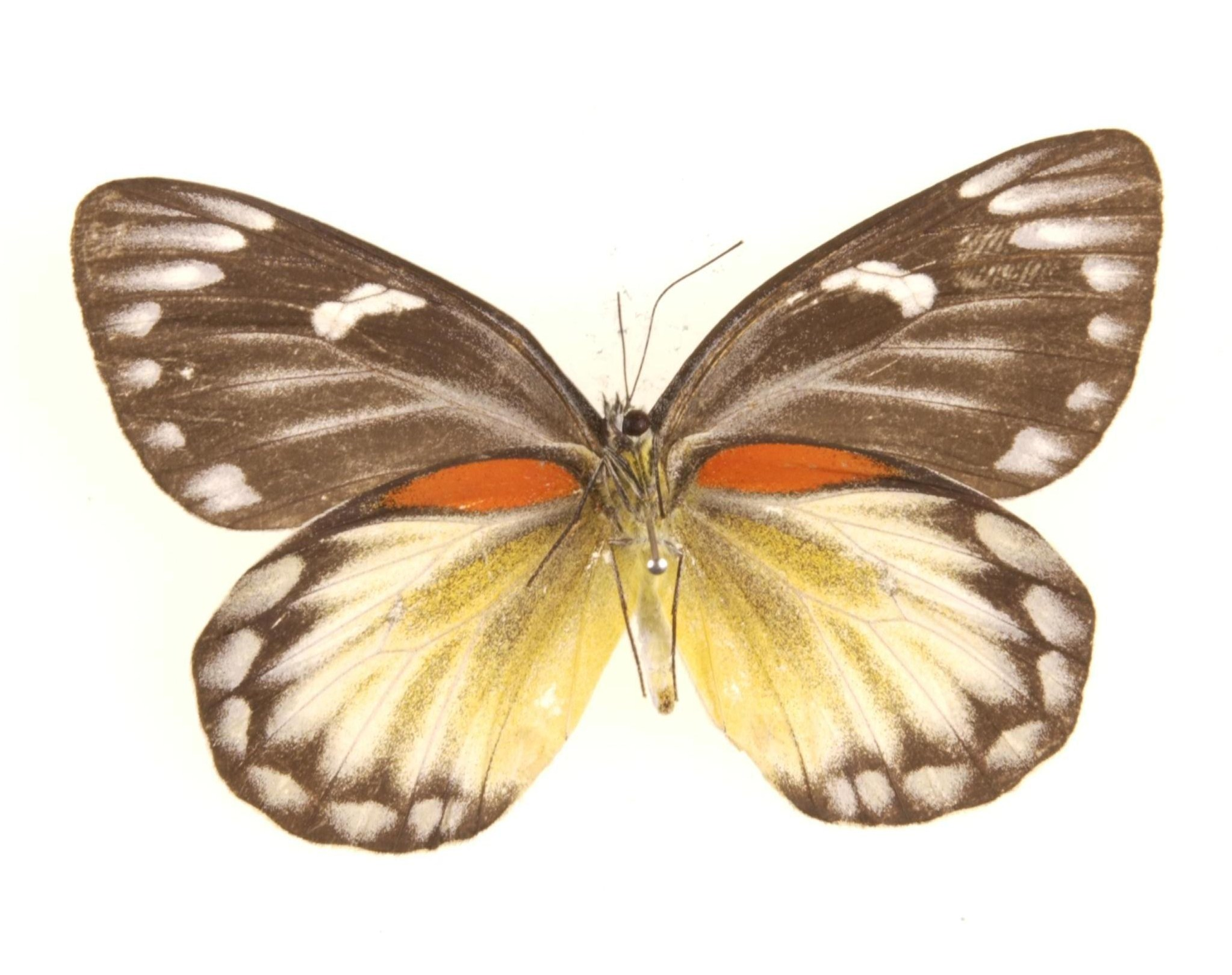
Underside

Upperside: black. Forewing: a broad oblique apical cell-bar and a curved subterminal series of somewhat hastate (spear-shaped) spots, white. Hindwing: apical two-thirds of costa and the termen broadly black, the rest of the wing yellowish white sparsely irrorated with black scales; the vermilion streak in interspace 8 on the underside shows through by transparency, and the broad terminal black border has a subterminal very obscurely marked series of whitish spots. Underside: forewing as in the male but the grey bordering restricted to very narrow streaks along the median vein and veins 2 to 4. Hindwing: differs from that of the male as follows: the rich chrome yellow replaced by dull white touched with yellow along the dorsal margin and in the cell and lightly irrorated in cell and interspaces with black scales, the inner margin of the black terminal border produced in the interspaces into more elongate cones. In both sexes: antennae black, head, thorax and abdomen above greyish; beneath white.

Wingspan of 83–90 mm.

== Distribution ==
The species is found in India in the states of Sikkim and Assam, Nepal, Bhutan, the Tanintharyi Region of Myanmar and extending to Thailand, Cochinchina in Vietnam and on the Malay Peninsula.
