= A. darlingtoni =

A. darlingtoni may refer to:

- Abacetus darlingtoni, a ground beetle
- Agonum darlingtoni, Darlington's harp ground beetle, found in North America
- Agonyx darlingtoni, a synonym of Pseudoangonyx excellens, a moth found in Aru, Papua New Guinea, and Australia
- Albericus darlingtoni, a synonym of Choerophryne darlingtoni, Darlington's rainforest frog, found in Papua New Guinea
- Anolis darlingtoni, a lizard found in Haiti
- Assa darlingtoni, the pouched frog, found in Australia
- Ataenius darlingtoni, a synonym of Ataenius picinus, the pitchy scarab, a dung beetle found in Australia, Oceania, and the Americas
