= Albert Stewart Meek =

English bird collector and naturalist

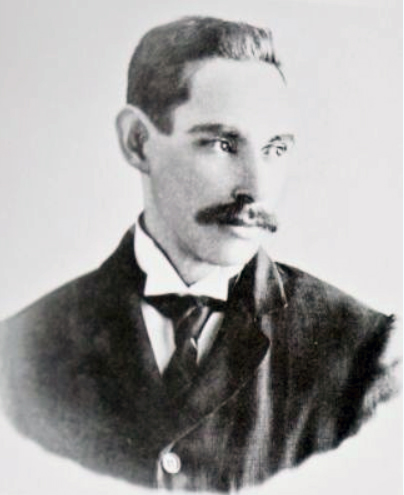
- Born: 26 October 1871
- Died: 1 October 1943 (aged 71)

Albert Stewart Meek (26 October 1871 – 1 October 1943) was an English bird collector and naturalist. He collected specimens for Lord Rothschild in New Guinea and other islands in South East Asia. He wrote about his adventures in the book A naturalist in cannibal land (1913).

== Biography ==
Meek was born on 26 October 1871 in Bow, London, the son of E. G. Meek, a merchant in natural history. In 1893 he travelled to Australia and spent some time at George Barnard’s cattle station at Coomooboolaroo, the only place in Australia where the now-extinct paradise parrot had occurred. It is not known if Meek ever saw this species.

In 1894 he began collecting bird and insect specimens for Lionel Walter Rothschild; first in England, then in Australia. Later, in the Pacific region (in particular the Solomon Islands, New Guinea and Bougainville, he was the first naturalist who observed the birdlife).

Meek also collected reptiles for the Natural History Museum in London, including the holotype and paratype of the venomous Woodlark Island snake (Toxicocalamus longissimus) from Woodlark Island, off the east coast of British New Guinea, and described by George Albert Boulenger in 1896, as the type-species of the genus Toxicocalamus. A third specimen collected by Meek, reported to have come from Fergusson Island in the d'Entrecasteaux Islands also off the east coast of British New Guinea, is also believed to have originated from Woodlark Island. Today this rare snake is still only known from twelve specimens in four museums.

Meek became a dealer in feathers and insects. In 1904 he travelled to Choiseul, where he collected the last specimens of the Choiseul crested pigeon. But, due to the horrible reputation of the islanders as cannibals, he was protected by an armed escort to bring the skins to his vessel. On an expedition in New Guinea in 1906 he discovered and shot the first specimen of the Queen Alexandra's birdwing (Ornithoptera alexandrae), the largest butterfly in the world. While on a visit to New Guinea he estimated that the headdress of a chief needed the feathers of more than 23 killed birds (e.g., birds of paradise), just to create the middle part.

His collection of bird skins and insects is held by the Natural History Museum in London. Specimens from Meek's collections can also be seen in the American Museum of Natural History.

Meek died on 1 October 1943 at his home in Bondi, Sydney. He had two sons and two daughters: Wilfred, Victor, Gladys and Marie.

== Tribute ==
Species named after Meek include eight full bird species:

- Choiseul crested pigeon (Migrogoura meeki),
- Meek's lorikeet (Charmosyna meeki),
- Meek's pygmy parrot (Micropsitta meeki),
- Bougainville crow (Corvus meeki),
- white-throated white-eye (Zosterops meeki),
- yellowish-streaked honeyeater (Ptiloprora meekiana),
- North Solomons dwarf kingfisher (Ceyx meeki) and the
- Manus hawk owl (Ninox meeki).

Also several butterfly and moth species were named after Meek, including

- Graphium meeki,
- Gnathothlibus meeki,
- Delias meeki,
- Angonyx meeki,
- Macroglossum meeki,
- Oxycanus meeki,
- Bindahara meeki,
- Acupicta meeki, and
- Udara meeki.

In 1896, Oldfield Thomas described Emballonura beccarii meeki, a subspecies of the Beccari's sheath-tailed bat of which Meek had collected the type series on Kiriwina, Trobriand Islands.

Despite the considerable collections of reptiles made by Meek, including the holotype and paratype of the rare elapid snake Toxicocalamus longissimus, only one reptile was named in his honour, a treesnake Dendrophis meeki, by G.A.Boulenger in 1895, this species now being a synonym of Dendrelaphis gastrostictus.

== Literature by and about Meek ==
- Rothschild, M. 1983. Dear Lord Rothschild: Birds, butterflies and history. Balaban, Philadelphia. xx + 398 pp. Mentions Walter Rothschild's collectors in New Guinea, including William Doherty, Albert S. Meek, Ernst Mayr, etc.
- Rothschild, W., and E. Hartert. 1913. List of the collections of birds made by Albert S. Meek in the lower ranges of the Snow Mountains, on the Eilanden River, and on Mount Goliath during the years 1910 and 1911.Novitates Zoologicae 20:473–527. Notes on Lepidoptera collected by Albert S. Meek in Irian Jaya during 1910 and 1911, including descriptions of localities
- Barbara and Richard Mearns, The Bird Collectors, Academic Press, 1998, ISBN 0-12-487440-1
- Albert S. Meek, A Naturalist in Cannibal Land, 1913, Fischer Unwin, London
- Tennent, John (2021) The man who shot butterflies – Albert Stewart Meek. Storm Entomological Publications.
