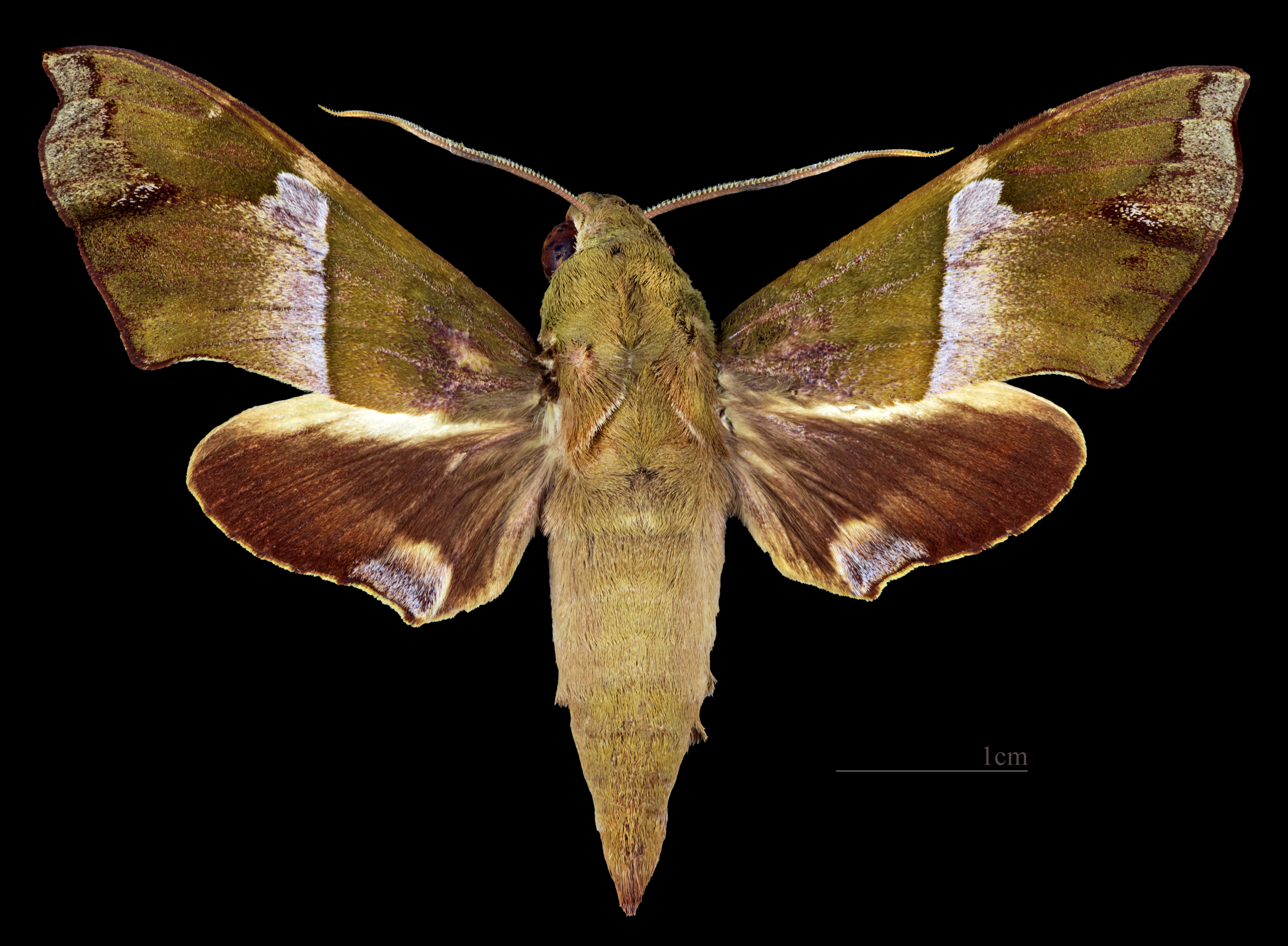
- Angonyx boisduvali

Scientific classification
- Domain: Eukaryota
- Kingdom: Animalia
- Phylum: Arthropoda
- Class: Insecta
- Order: Lepidoptera
- Family: Sphingidae
- Subfamily: Macroglossinae
- Tribe: Macroglossini
- Subtribe: Macroglossina
- Genus: Angonyx; Boisduval, 1875

= Angonyx =

Genus of moths

Angonyx is a genus of moths in the family Sphingidae erected by Jean Baptiste Boisduval in 1875.

== Species ==
- Angonyx boisduvali Rothschild 1894
- Angonyx chelsea Eitschberger & Melichar, 2009
- Angonyx excellens (Rothschild 1911)
- Angonyx kai Eitschberger, 2006
- Angonyx krishna Eitschberger & Haxaire, 2006
- Angonyx meeki Rothschild & Jordan 1903
- Angonyx papuana Rothschild & Jordan 1903
- Angonyx testacea (Walker 1856)
- Angonyx williami Eitschberger & Melichar, 2009
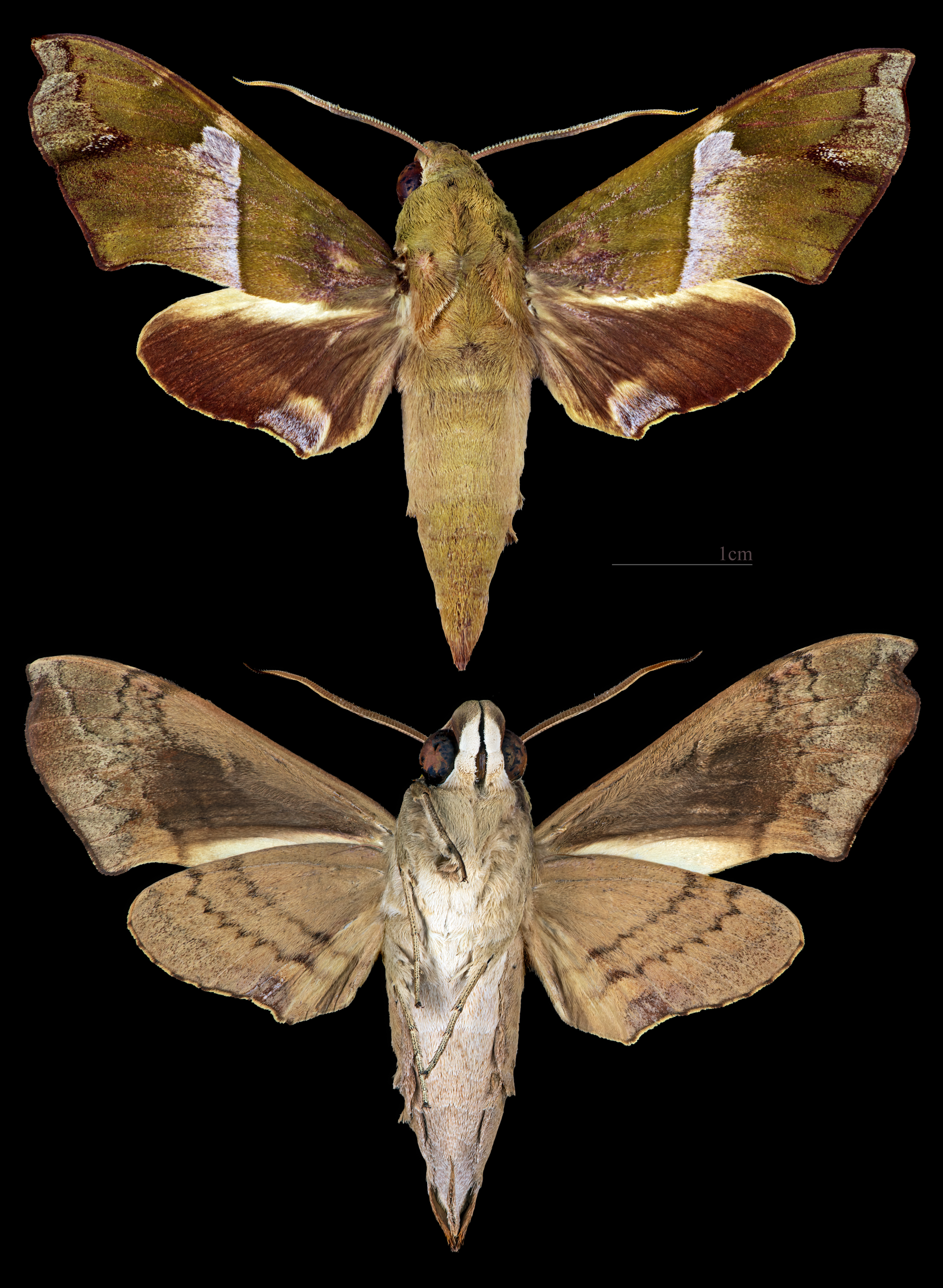
Angonyx boisduvali

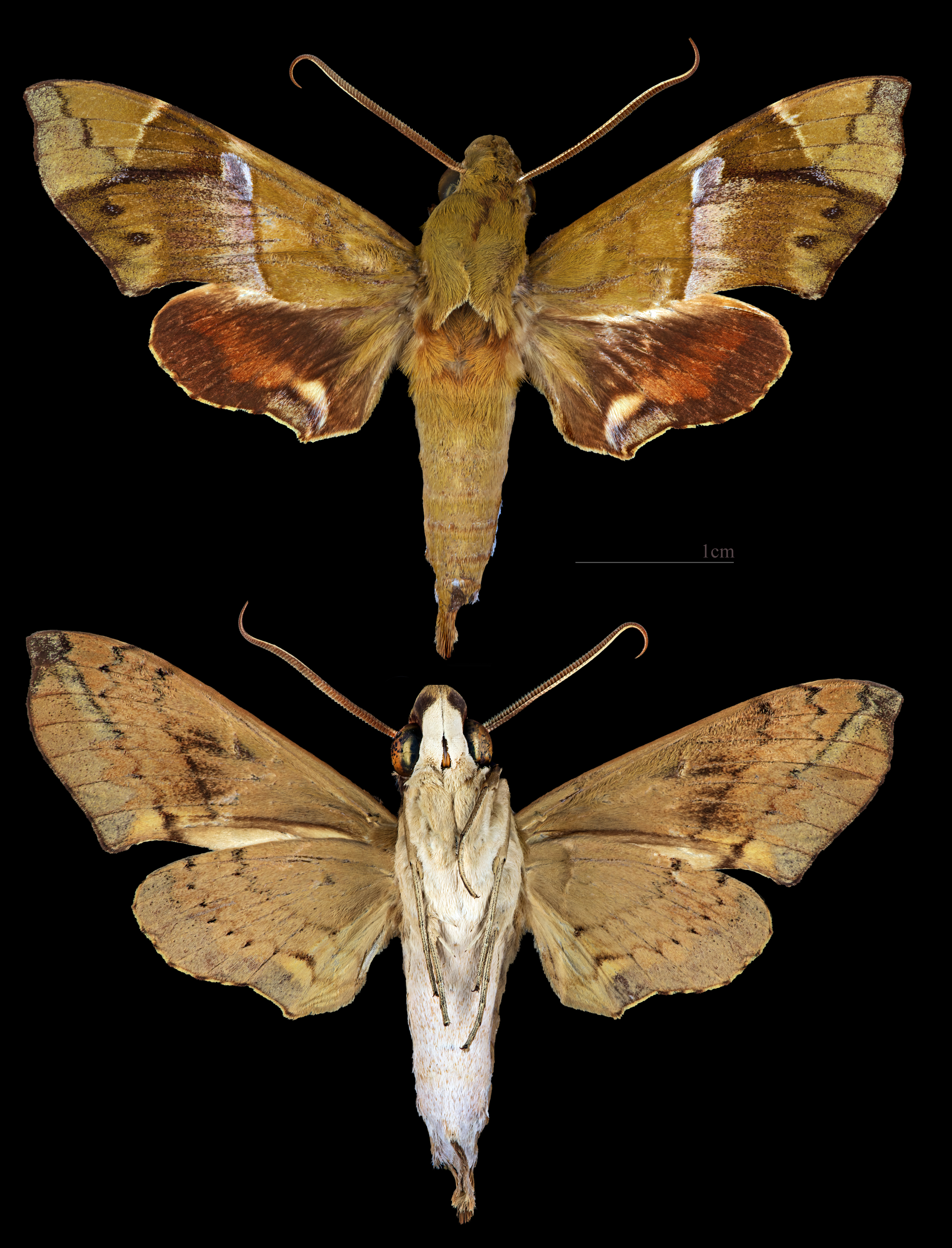
Angonyx papuana

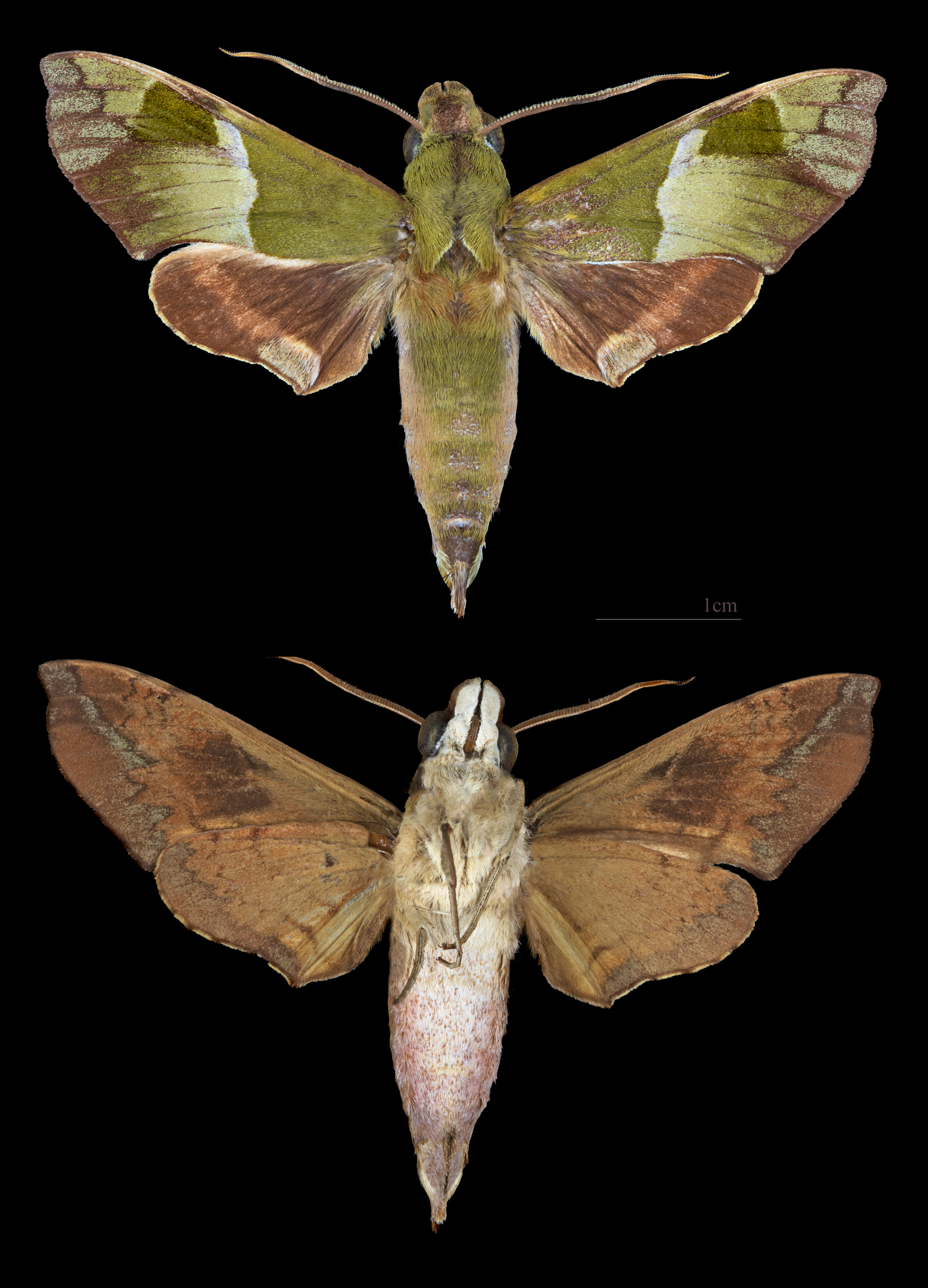
Angonyx testacea
