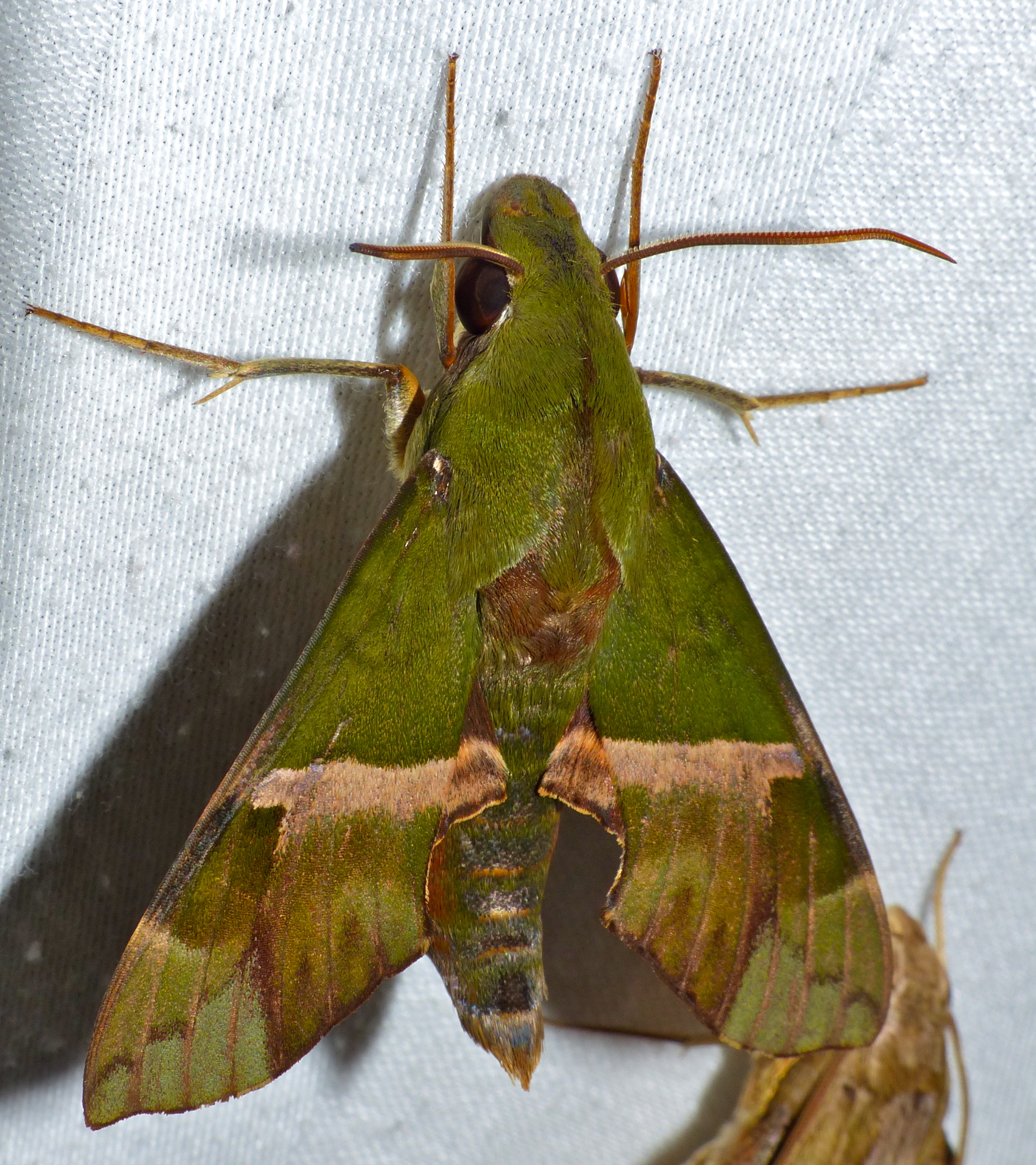

Scientific classification
- Domain: Eukaryota
- Kingdom: Animalia
- Phylum: Arthropoda
- Class: Insecta
- Order: Lepidoptera
- Family: Sphingidae
- Genus: Angonyx
- Species: A. testacea

Binomial name
- Angonyx testacea (Walker, 1856)

Synonyms
- Perigonia testacea Walker, 1856; Angonyx emilia Boisduval, 1875; Tylognathus emus Boisduval, 1875; Panacra ella Butler, 1875; Angonyx menghaiensis Meng, 1991

= Angonyx testacea =

Species of moth

Angonyx testacea, the northern dark-green hawkmoth, is a moth of the family Sphingidae.

== Distribution ==
It is found in Nepal, northern India, the Andaman Islands, Myanmar, southern China, Taiwan, Thailand, Vietnam, Malaysia (Peninsular, Sarawak), Indonesia (Sumatra, Java, Kalimantan) and Philippines (Palawan, Luzon). The isolated population in southern India and Sri Lanka is a separate species, namely Angonyx krishna.

== Description ==
The wingspan is 54–64 mm.

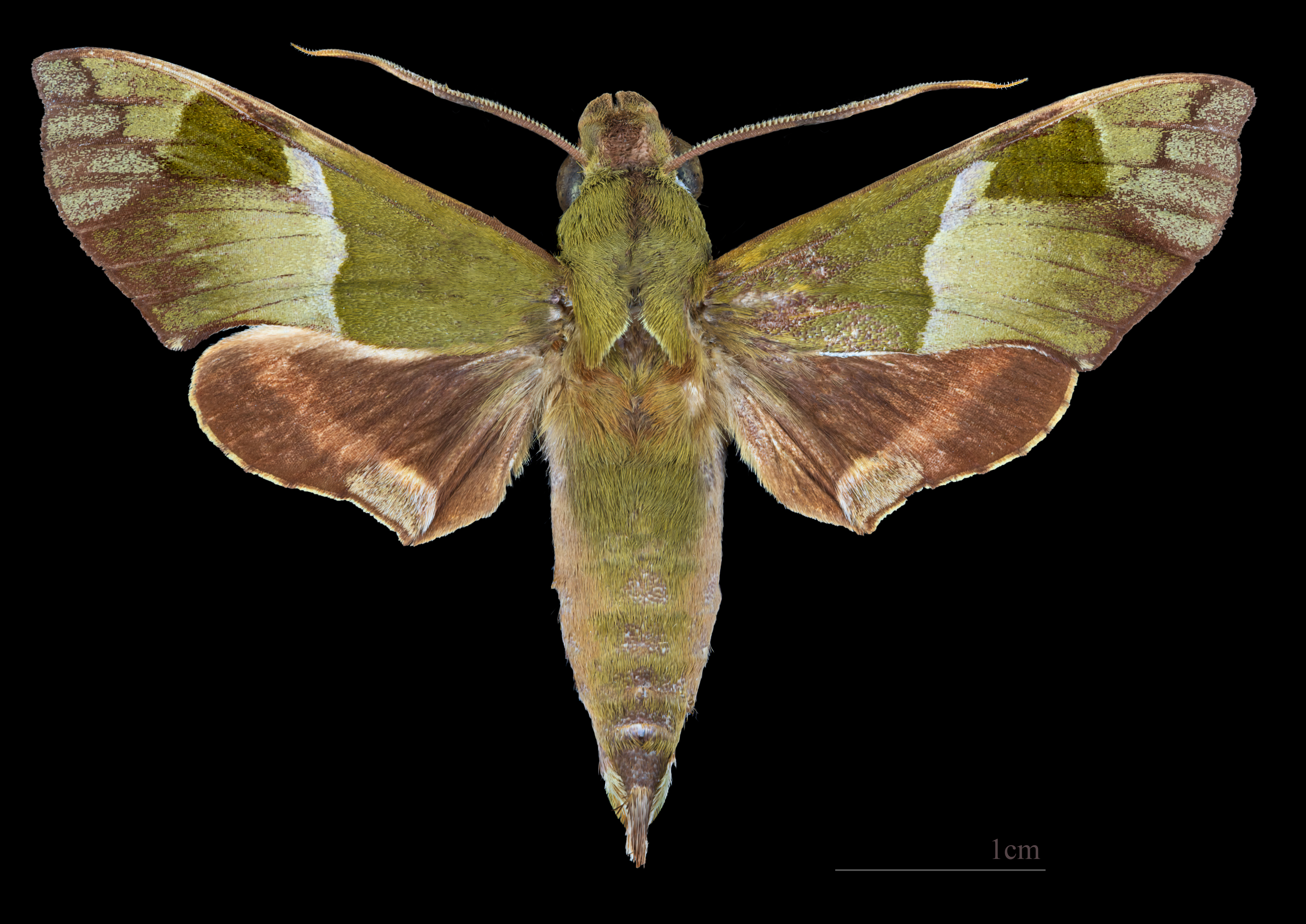
Angonyx testacea ♂

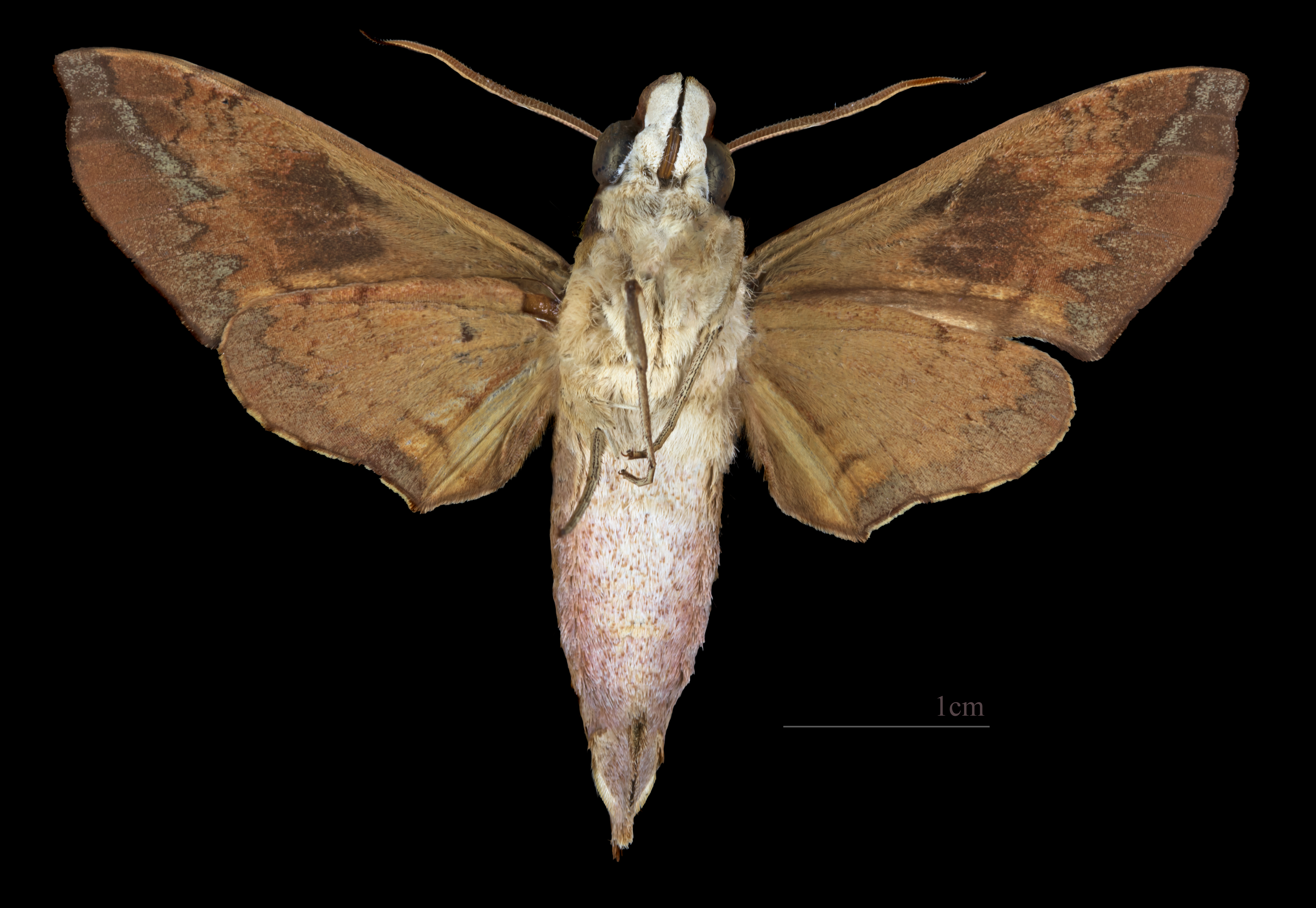
Angonyx testacea ♂ △

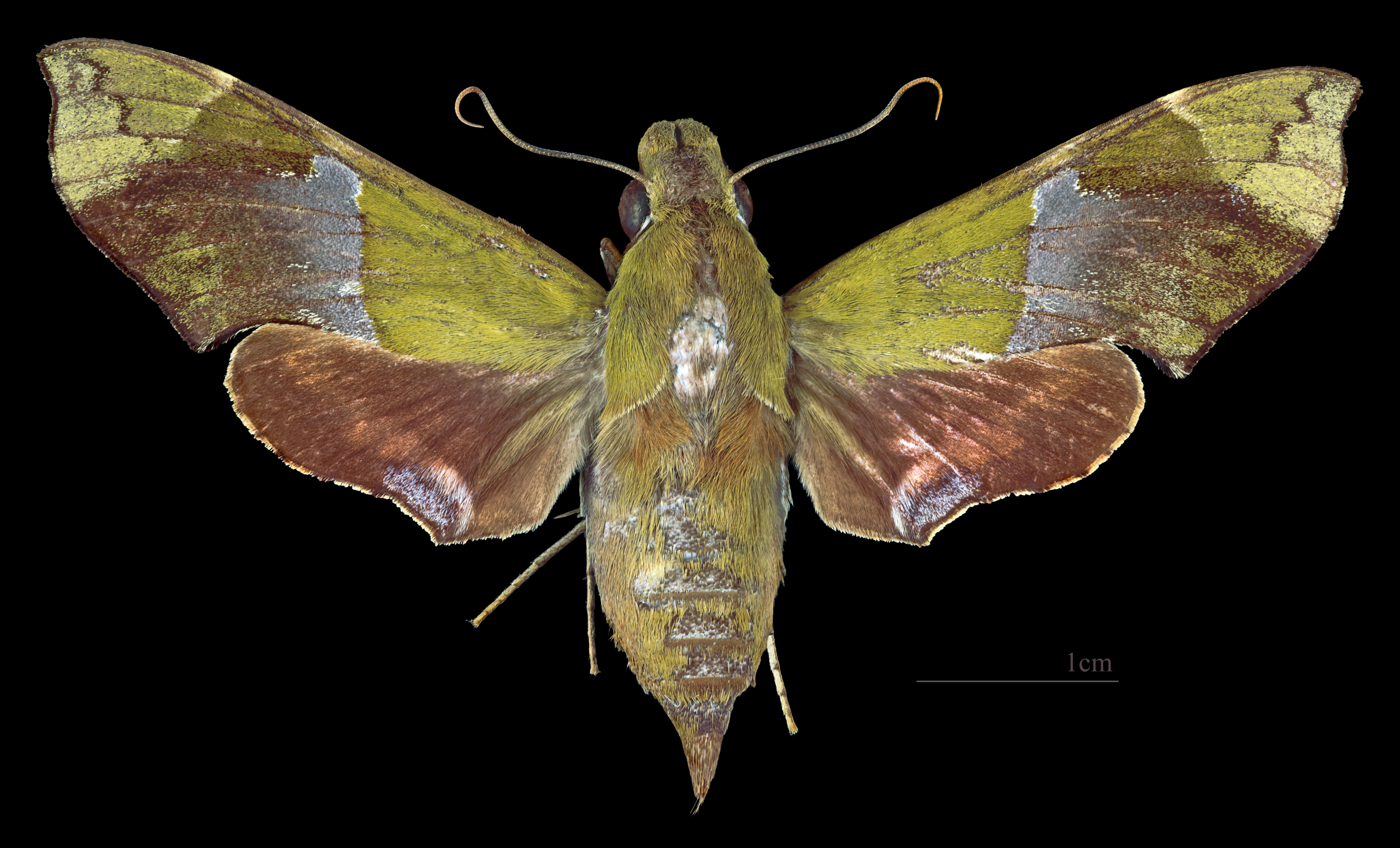
Angonyx testacea ♀

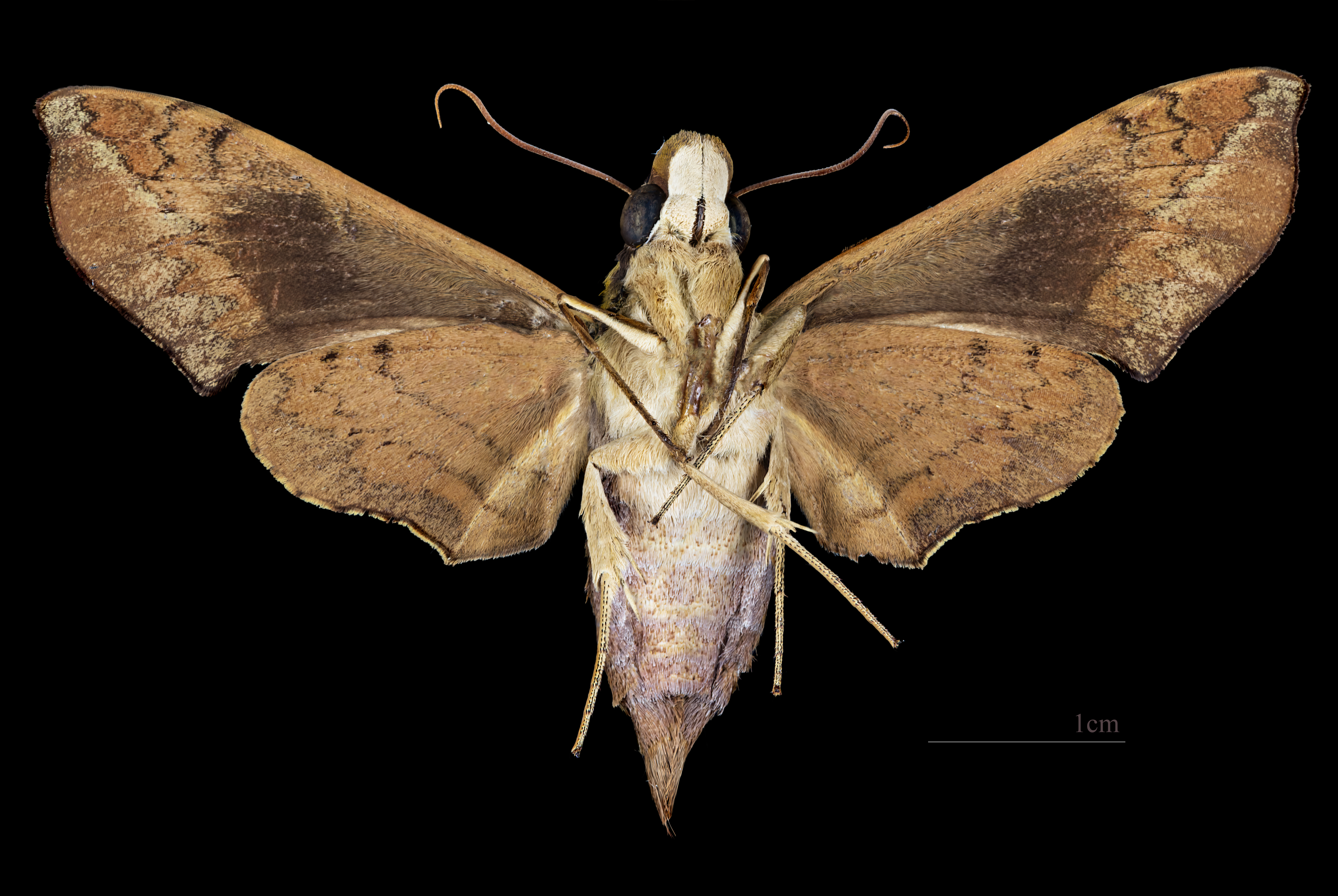
Angonyx testacea ♀ △

== Biology ==
There are several generations per year in Hong Kong, with adults on wing from mid-February to early July, and again from late August to early January, with peaks in April, June, mid-October and late November.

The larvae have been recorded on Strychnos nux-vomica in India.
