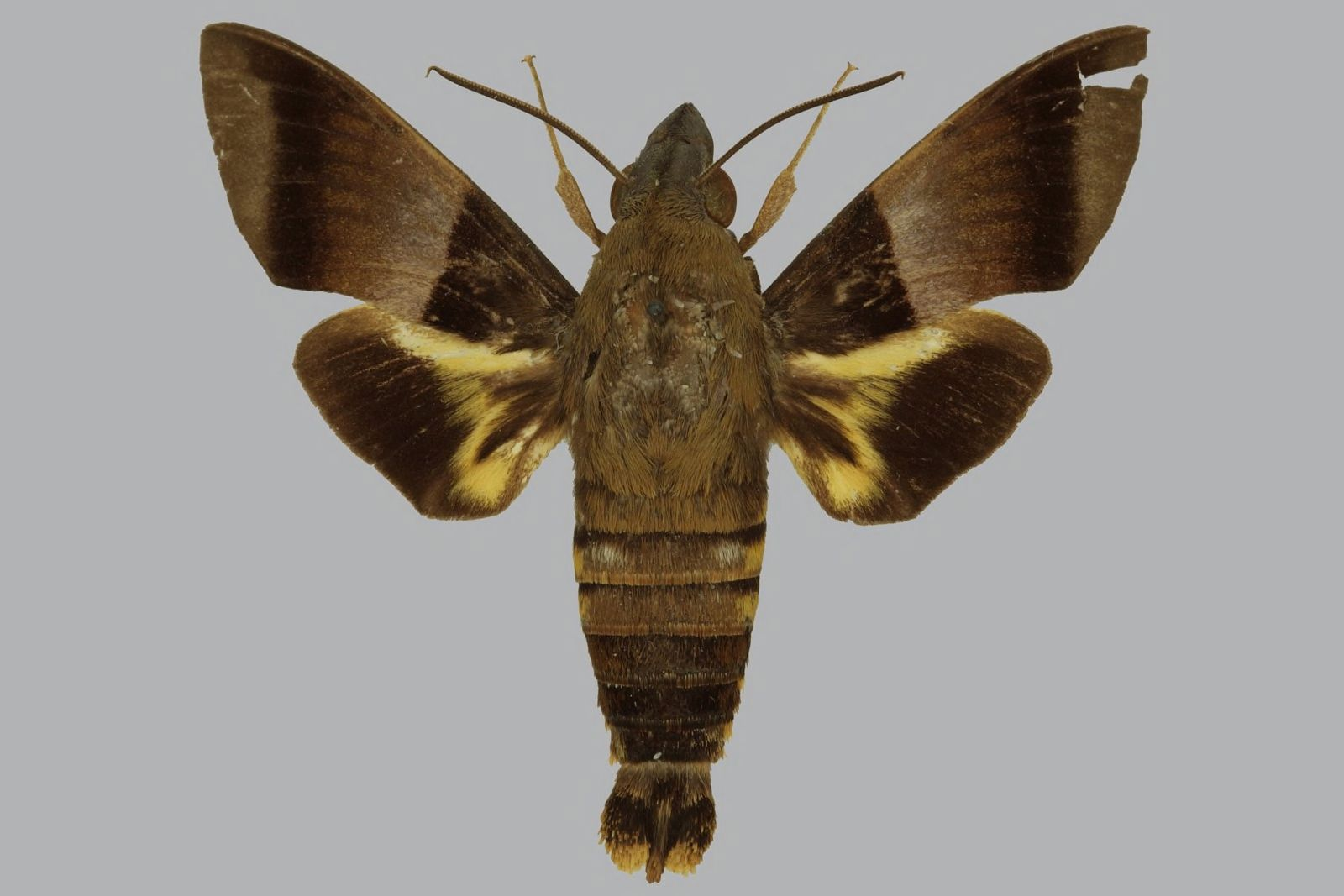

Scientific classification
- Kingdom: Animalia
- Phylum: Arthropoda
- Clade: Pancrustacea
- Class: Insecta
- Order: Lepidoptera
- Family: Sphingidae
- Genus: Macroglossum
- Species: M. meeki

Binomial name
- Macroglossum meeki Rothschild & Jordan, 1903

= Macroglossum meeki =

Species of moth

Macroglossum meeki is a moth of the family Sphingidae. It is known from Papua New Guinea.

The length of the forewings is about 27 mm. It is similar to Macroglossum passalus and Macroglossum faro. The head upperside is slate-coloured, with a darker dorsal midline. The thorax upperside is olive green. The palpus underside is slaty grey, speckled with white. The underside of the thorax and legs is clayish ochre. The underside of both wings is walnut-brown and the distal borders are dark brown. The forewing underside is yellow at the extreme base. The hindwing upperside has an interrupted yellow band.
