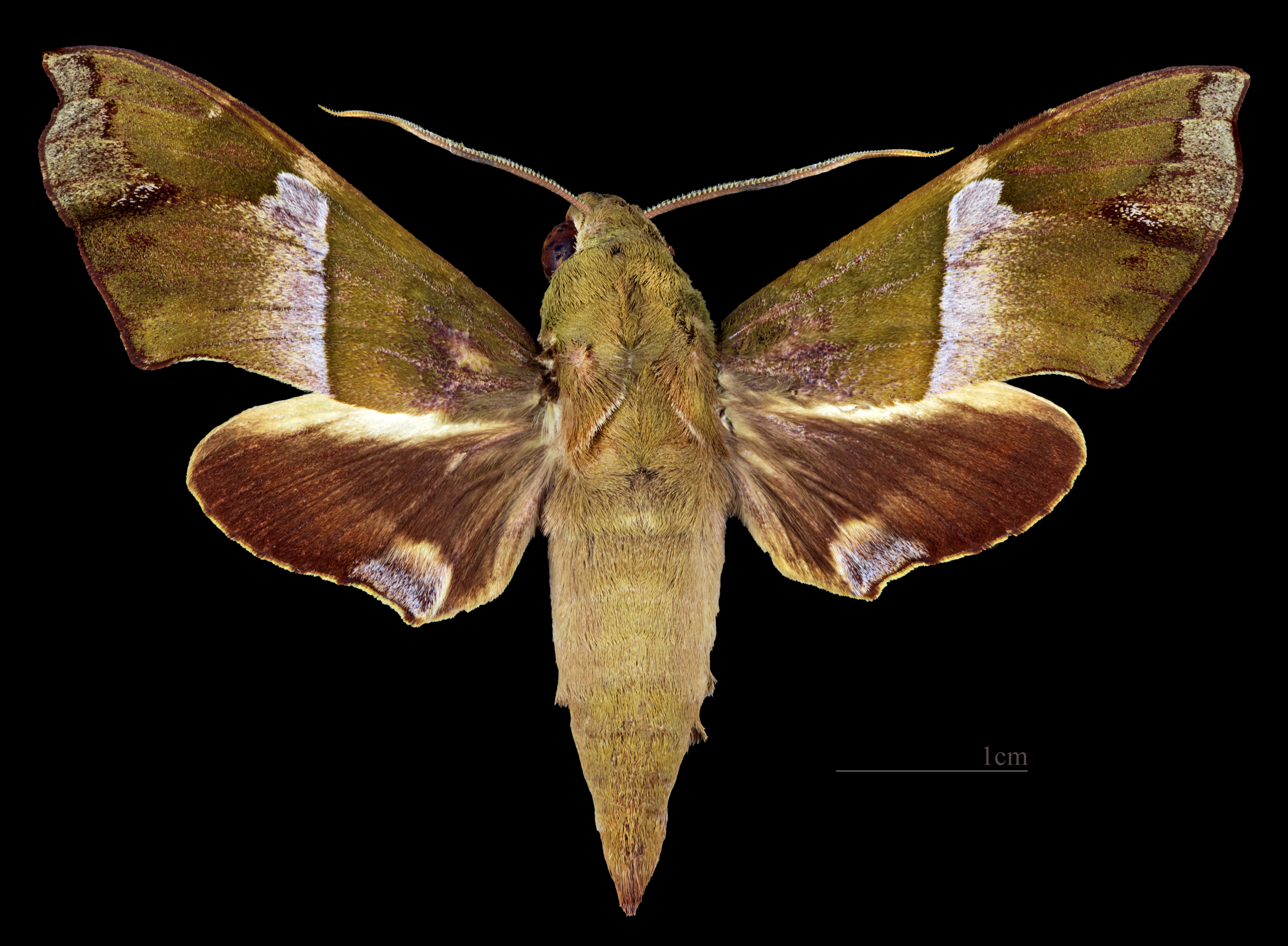
- Angonyx boisduvali ♂
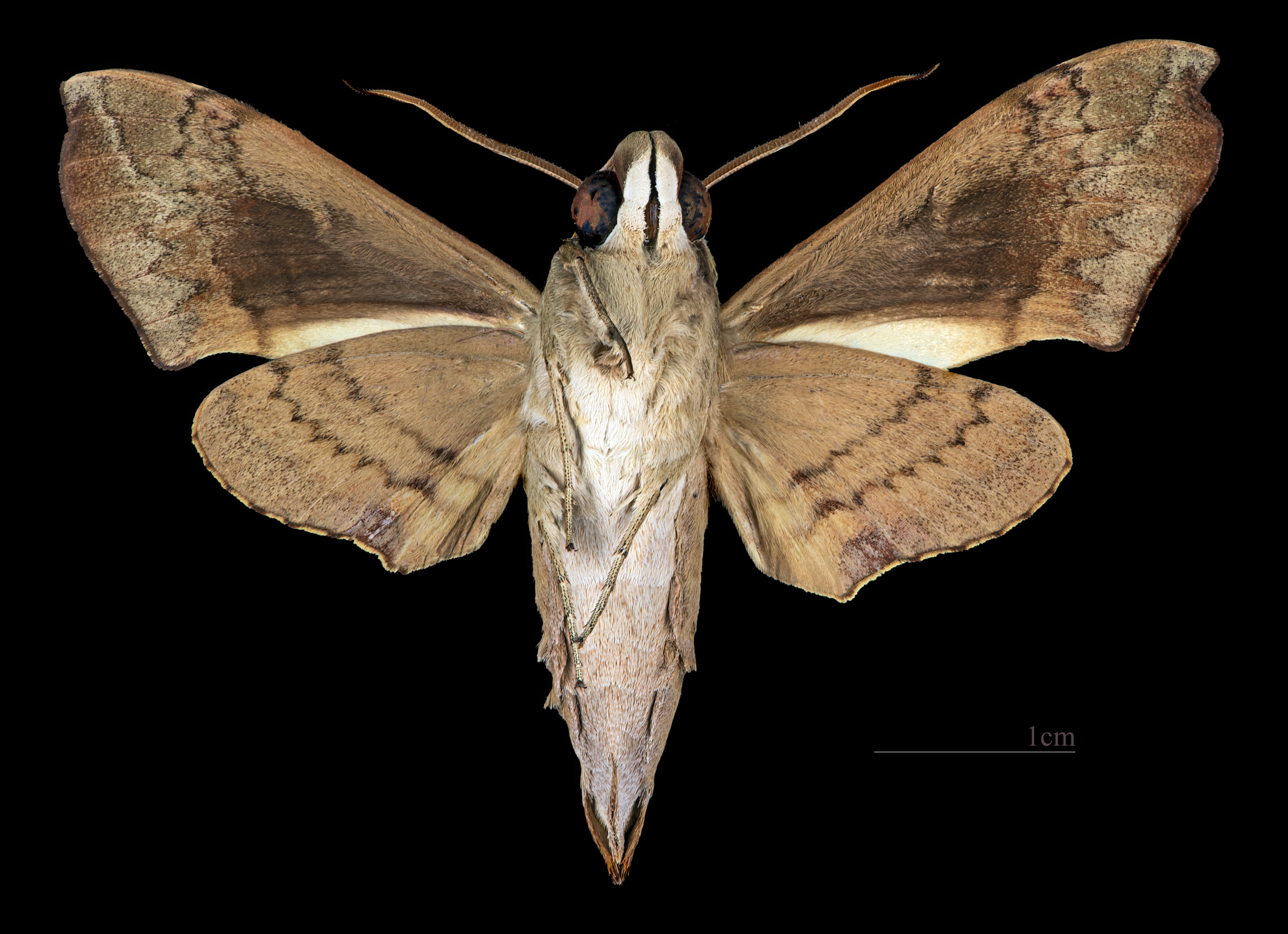
- Angonyx boisduvali ♂ △

Scientific classification
- Domain: Eukaryota
- Kingdom: Animalia
- Phylum: Arthropoda
- Class: Insecta
- Order: Lepidoptera
- Family: Sphingidae
- Genus: Angonyx
- Species: A. boisduvali

Binomial name
- Angonyx boisduvali Rothschild, 1894

= Angonyx boisduvali =

Species of moth

Angonyx boisduvali is a moth of the family Sphingidae. It is found in the Bismarck Archipelago, Solomon Islands and Papua New Guinea.

The forewing upperside is similar to Angonyx papuana, but the pale grey median band posterior to the discal spot is broader, paler and gradually fading into the ground colour, lacking any dark scaling in this area.
