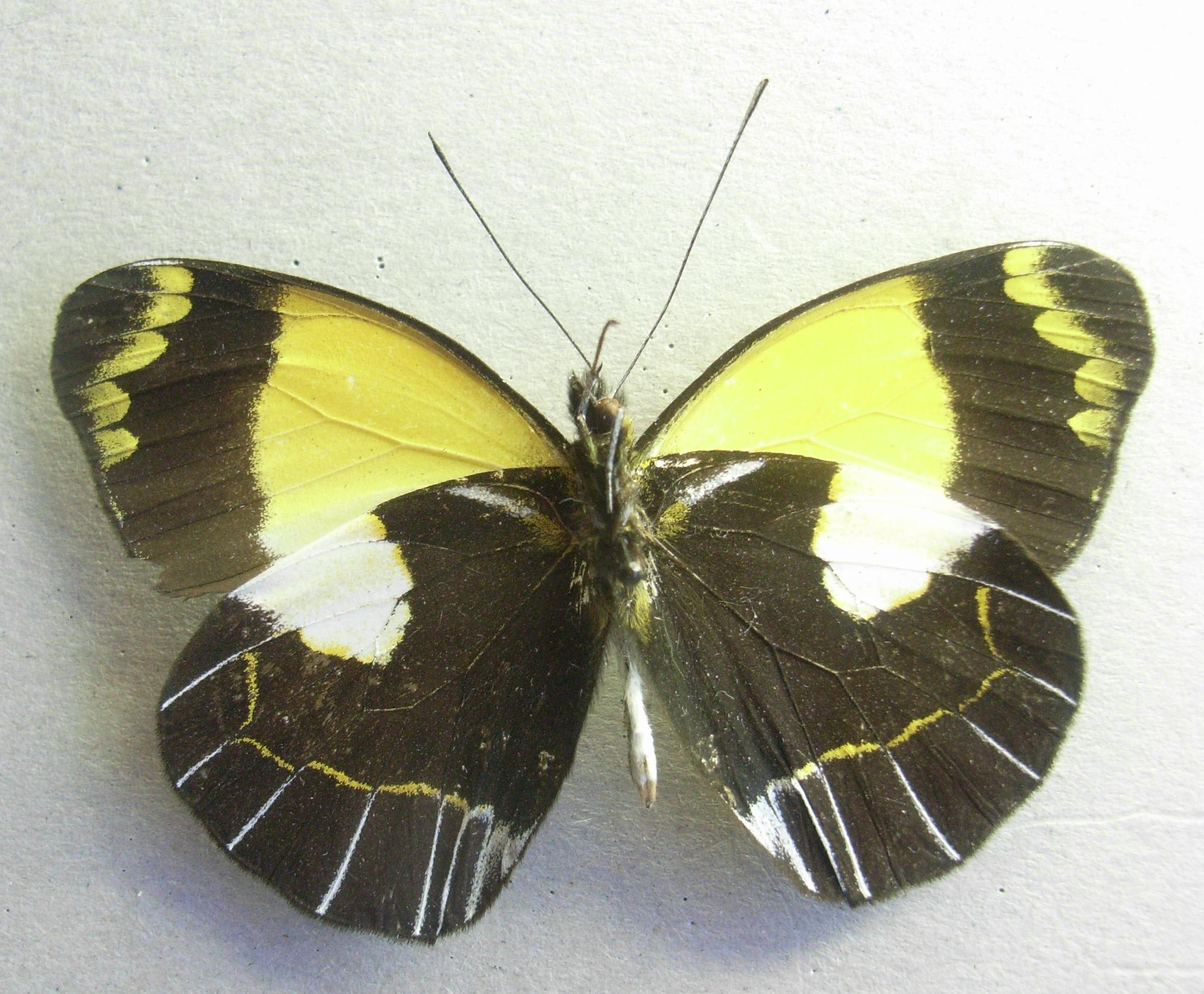
- Underside

Scientific classification
- Kingdom: Animalia
- Phylum: Arthropoda
- Class: Insecta
- Order: Lepidoptera
- Family: Pieridae
- Genus: Delias
- Species: D. meeki

Binomial name
- Delias meeki Rothschild & Jordan, 1904

Synonyms
- Delias meeki insula Roepke, 1955; Delias meeki peninsula Roepke, 1955

= Delias meeki =

Species of butterfly

Delias meeki is a butterfly from the family Pieridae. It occurs in seven subspecies in New Guinea. The specific name commemorates English naturalist Albert Stewart Meek who collected the type series in May 1903 at Owgarra north of head of the Aroa River in Papua New Guinea. It forms a species group with the sympatric species Delias niepelti

== Description ==
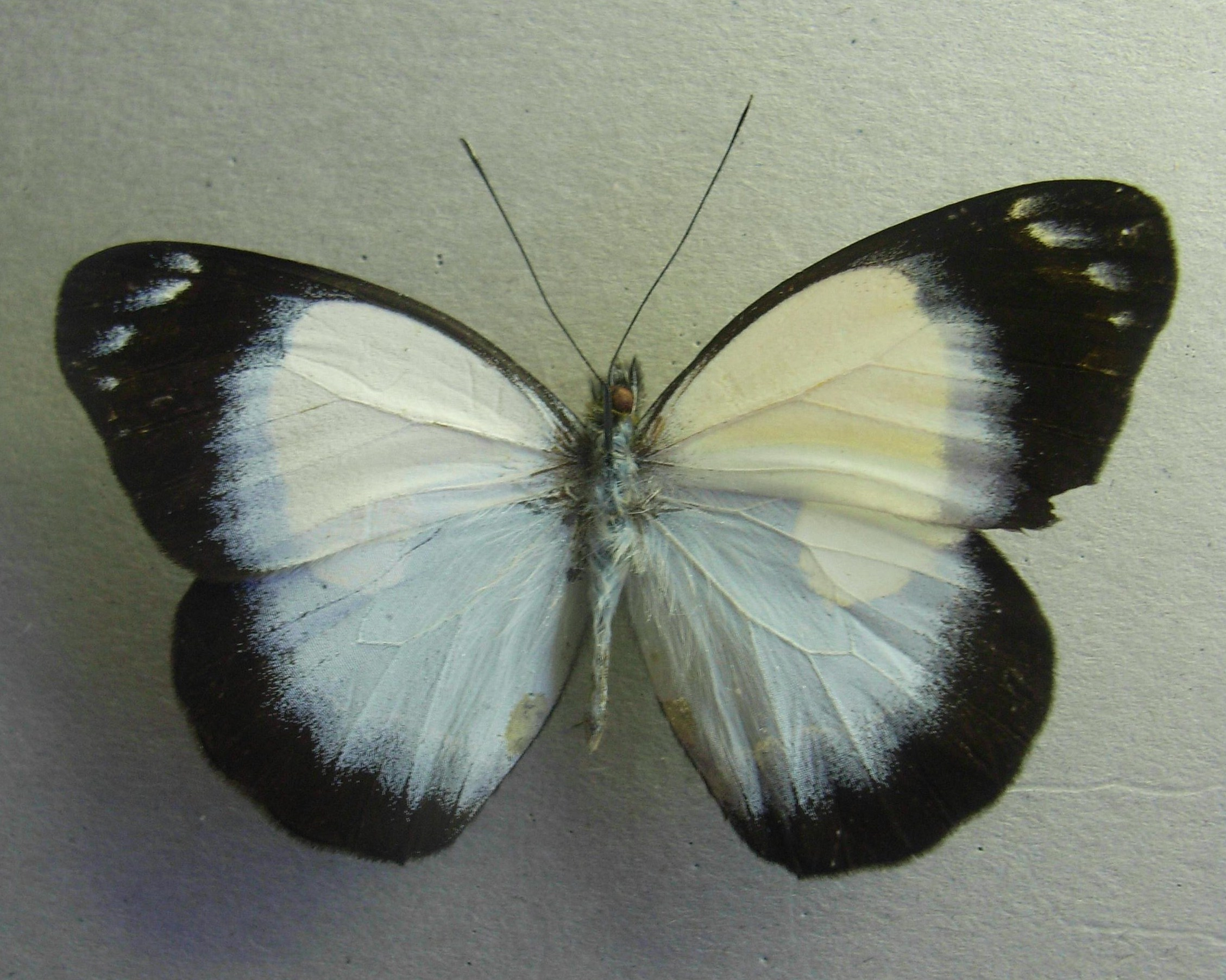
Upperside

It has a wingspan of 62 mm. The upperside of the males is similar to that of the males of Delias niepelti. The white area of the forewing is more sharply defined, more straight distally, and anteriorly rather more extended. There are two white spots beyond the upper angle of the cell. The underside shows also that of D. niepelti but the yellow area of the forewing is much paler and distally straight, the subapical spots are slightly smaller. The hindwing has a yellowish-white costal patch which is reaching down to the cell. The upperside of the females is black whereas the colouring is rather more extended than on the upperside of the females of D. niepelti. The yellow area of the forewing is more straight distally. The basal half of the hindwing is grey. The area between the second subcosta (SC2) and the first radius (R1) or a little beyond these veins is yellowish. On the underside the yellow area of the forewing is paler than in the females of D. niepelti. It is less extended and distally straight. The hindwing shows a yellowish white costal patch which does not extend beyond the first radius not being triangular as in the males but longitudinal.

== Subspecies ==
- Delias meeki meeki (Owen Stanley Range, Papua New Guinea)
- Delias meeki albimarginata Talbot, 1929 (Weyland Mountains, Paniai Lakes, Ilaga, Irian Jaya)
- Delias meeki arfakensis Joicey & Talbot, 1922 (Arfak Mountains, Irian Jaya)
- Delias meeki hypochrysis Roepke, 1955 (Baliem Valley, Irian Jaya)
- Delias meeki hypoxantha Roepke, 1955 (Baliem Valley, Irian Jaya)
- Delias meeki neagra Jordan, 1911 (Mount Goliath; Langda, Irian Jaya)
- Delias meeki septentrionalis Rothschild, 1924 (Rawlinson Mountains, Papua New Guinea)

The nominate race D. m. meeki occurs in the Owen Stanley Range in Papua New Guinea. D. m. neagra is known from Mount Goliath at Langda in the Papua Province. D. m. arfakensis is endemic to the Arfak Mountains in the Papua Province. D. m. septentrionalis is known from the Rawlinson Mountains in Papua New Guinea. D. m. albimarginata occurs in the Weyland Mountains, Paniai, Ilaga, Papua Province. The two subspecies D. m. hypochrysis and D. m. hypoxantha are both known from the Baliem Valley in West Papua.
