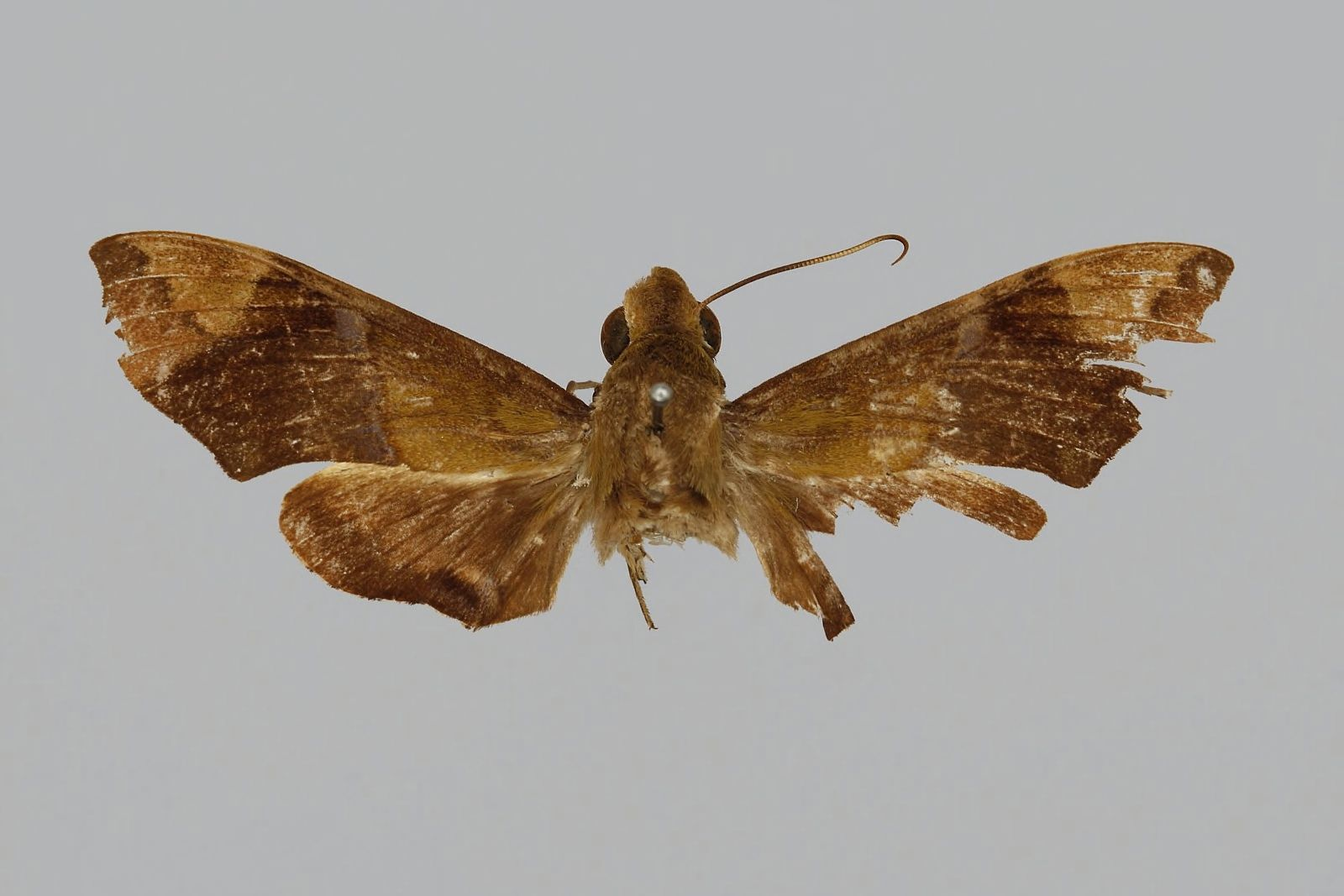

Scientific classification
- Kingdom: Animalia
- Phylum: Arthropoda
- Class: Insecta
- Order: Lepidoptera
- Family: Sphingidae
- Genus: Angonyx
- Species: A. chelsea

Binomial name
- Angonyx chelsea Eitschberger & Melichar, 2009

= Angonyx chelsea =

Species of moth

Angonyx chelsea is a moth of the family Sphingidae first described by Ulf Eitschberger and Tomáš Melichar in 2009. It is known from the West New Britain Province in Papua New Guinea.
