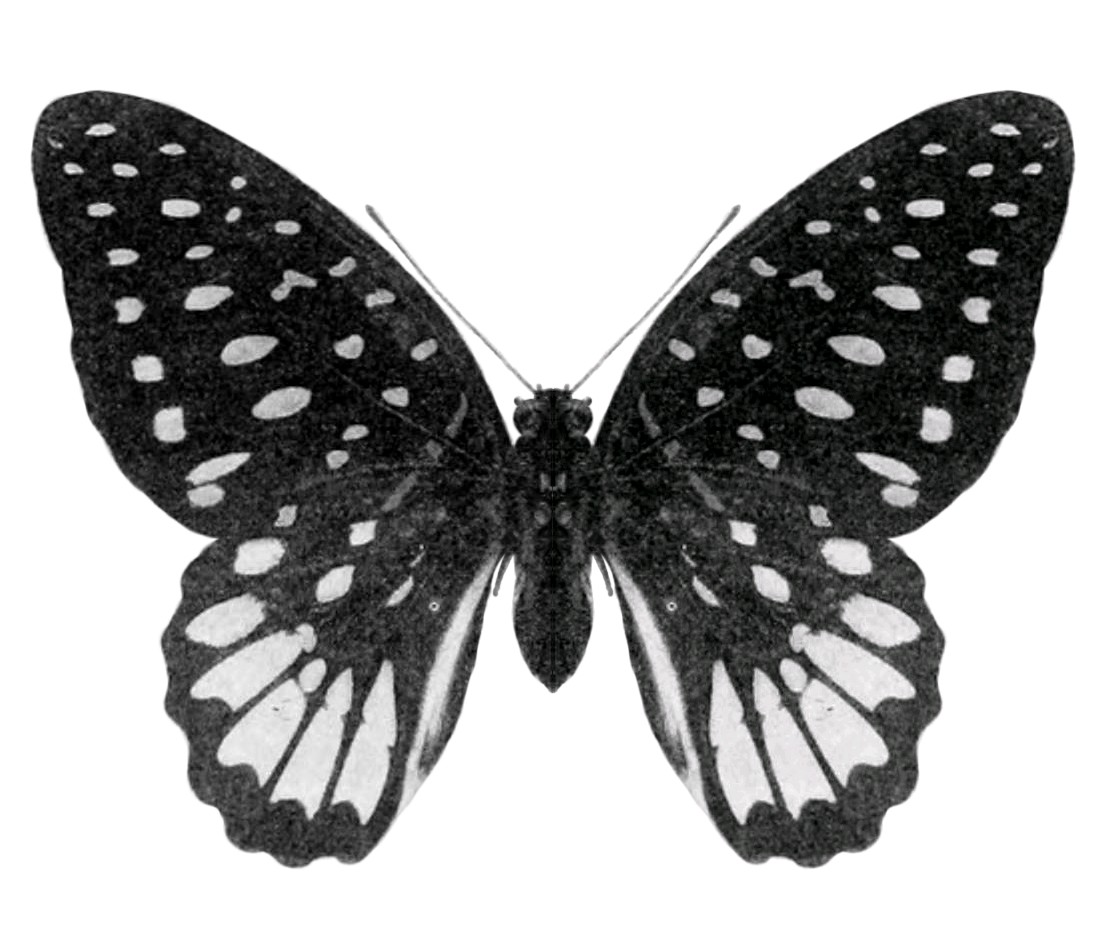

Conservation status
- Least Concern (IUCN 3.1)

Scientific classification
- Kingdom: Animalia
- Phylum: Arthropoda
- Class: Insecta
- Order: Lepidoptera
- Family: Papilionidae
- Genus: Graphium
- Species: G. meeki

Binomial name
- Graphium meeki Rothschild, 1901

= Meek's graphium =

Species of butterfly

The Meek's graphium (Graphium meeki) is a species of butterfly in the family Papilionidae. It is found in Papua New Guinea and the Solomon Islands.

== Etymology ==
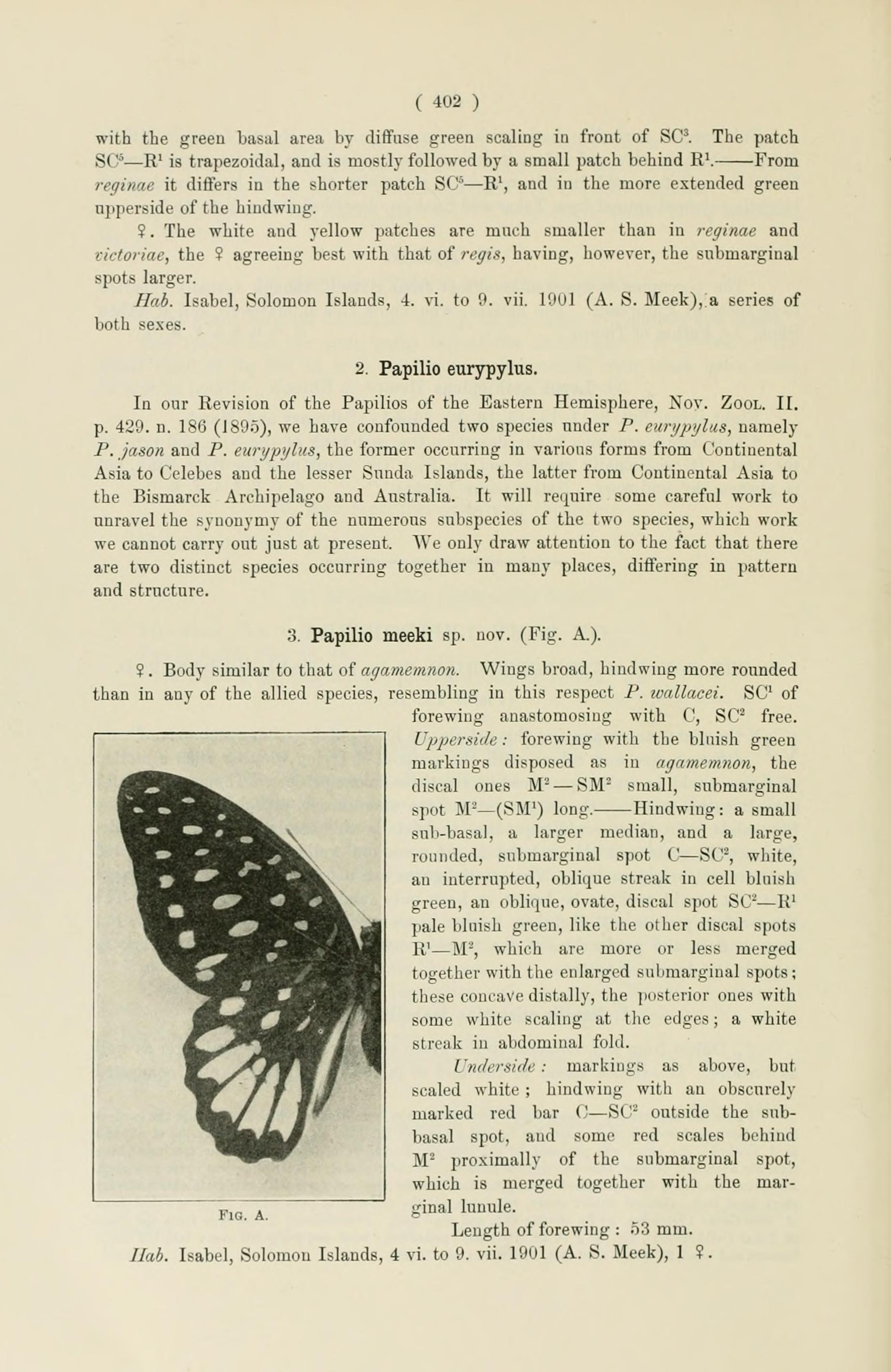
Original description and figure

The name honours the English bird collector and naturalist Albert Stewart Meek.
