= Angonyx kai =

Scientific classification
- Kingdom: Animalia
- Phylum: Arthropoda
- Class: Insecta
- Order: Lepidoptera
- Family: Sphingidae
- Genus: Angonyx
- Species: A. kai

Binomial name
- Angonyx kai Eitschberger, 2006

Species of moth

Angonyx kai is a moth of the family Sphingidae. It is known from the Kai Archipelago in Indonesia.
