= George Barnard (zoologist) =

George Greensill Barnard (born 30 March 1831 in Chislehurst, London; died 11 March 1894 in Launceston, Tasmania) was a British entomologist and ornithologist.

== Life ==
George Barnard was born as eldest son of the eleven children of George William Barnard and Anne Greensill at Lea, Chislehurst, Kent, England. In 1845, he and his family emigrated to Van Diemen's Land and settled at 'Landfall' homestead on the Tamar River near Launceston.

He owned a huge collection of insect specimens with the main focus on Coleoptera and Lepidoptera as well as large collection of bird eggs. In 1891, he established a museum for his collections on his property at Coomooboolaroo 14 mi (23 km) south of Duaringa, Queensland, Australia. After his death the insect collection was purchased by the Walter Rothschild Zoological Museum in Tring. Naturalist Albert Stewart Meek who was a friend of Barnard and spent some time at Coomooboolaroo in the 1890s made Lord Rothschild aware of this collection.

Barnard wrote many ornithological articles for the Descriptive catalogue of the nests & eggs of birds found breeding in Australia and Tasmania. (1889), Alfred John North's oology studies published as the Australian Museum's catalogue number twelve. His first wife, Maria Barnard, delivered the illustrations of the birds. The couple had seven children, including ornithologist Charles Ashmall Barnard (1867-1942), founding member and later president of the Royal Australasian Ornithologists Union, and Henry "Harry" Greensill Barnard (1869-1966), a zoologist after whom Lasiorhinus krefftii barnardi, a subspecies of the Northern hairy-nosed wombat (Lasiorhinus krefftii) was named.
