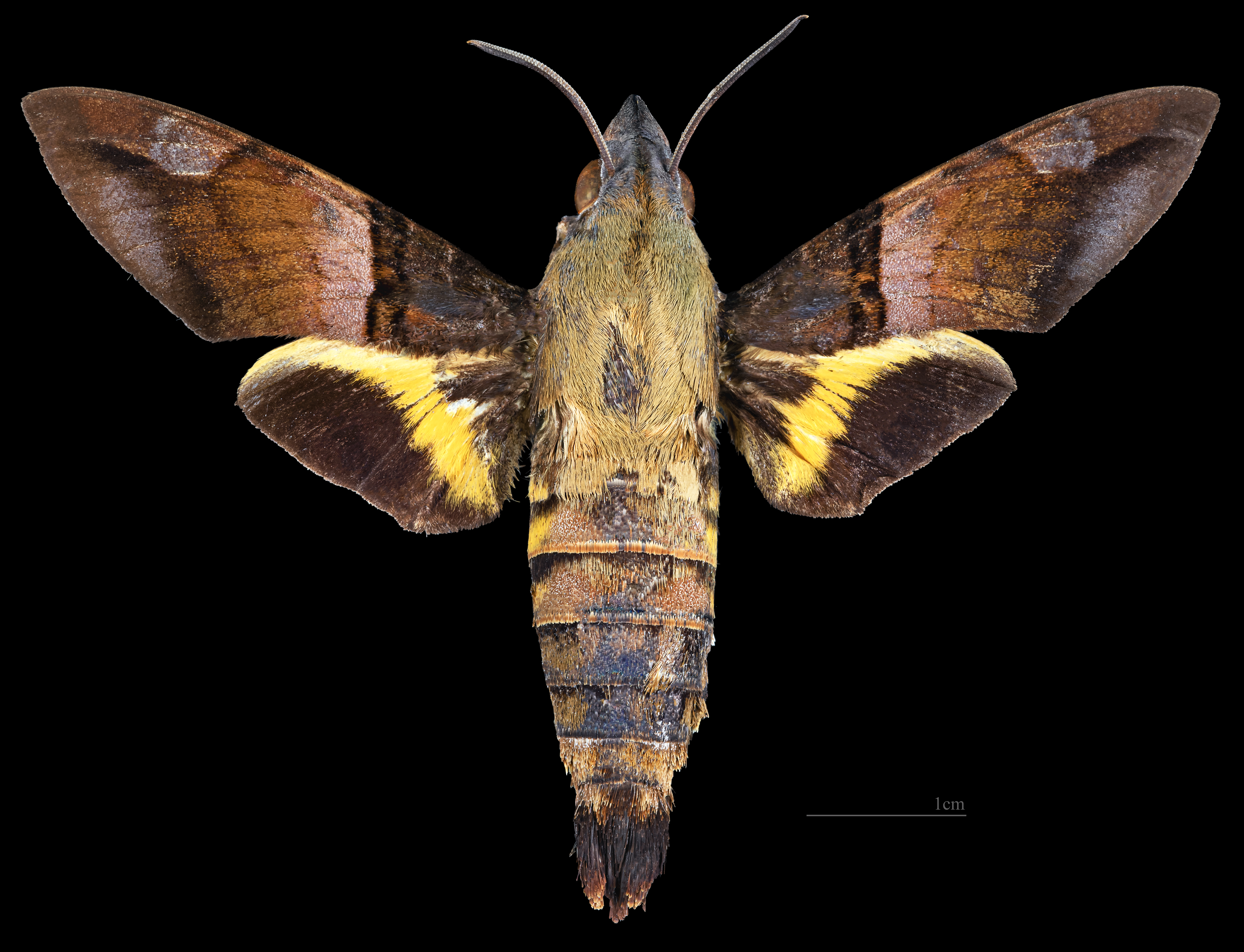
- Macroglossum faro faro Male dorsal
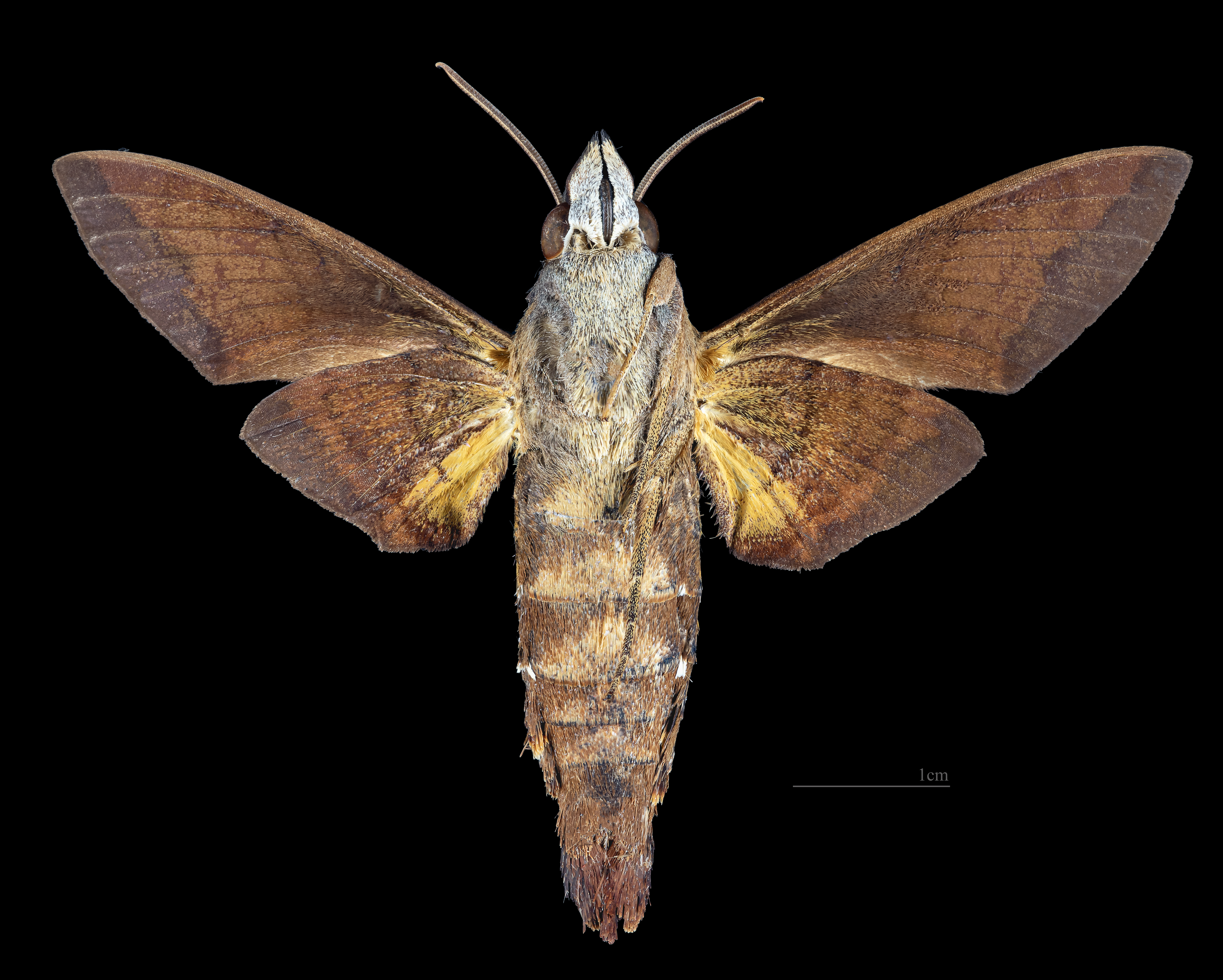
- Macroglossum faro faro Male ventral

Scientific classification
- Kingdom: Animalia
- Phylum: Arthropoda
- Class: Insecta
- Order: Lepidoptera
- Family: Sphingidae
- Genus: Macroglossum
- Species: M. faro

Binomial name
- Macroglossum faro (Cramer, 1779)

Synonyms
- Sphinx faro Cramer, 1779

= Macroglossum faro =

Species of moth

Macroglossum faro, the large hummingbird hawkmoth, is a moth of the family Sphingidae. It is known from southern India, Thailand, south-eastern China, southern Japan (Ryukyu Archipelago), Vietnam, Malaysia (Peninsular, Sarawak) and Indonesia (Sumatra, Java, Kalimantan).

The wingspan is 74–78 mm. It is the largest known Macroglossum species. It is similar in colour and pattern to Macroglossum passalus, but the thorax upperside and sometimes the first abdominal tergites are green, with no sharply defined dark area on the mesothoracic tegula. The abdomen has yellow patches which are comparatively smaller. The hindwing underside base is obviously shaded with yellow.

== Subspecies ==
- Macroglossum faro faro
- Macroglossum faro cottoni Cadiou, 2000 (Sulawesi)
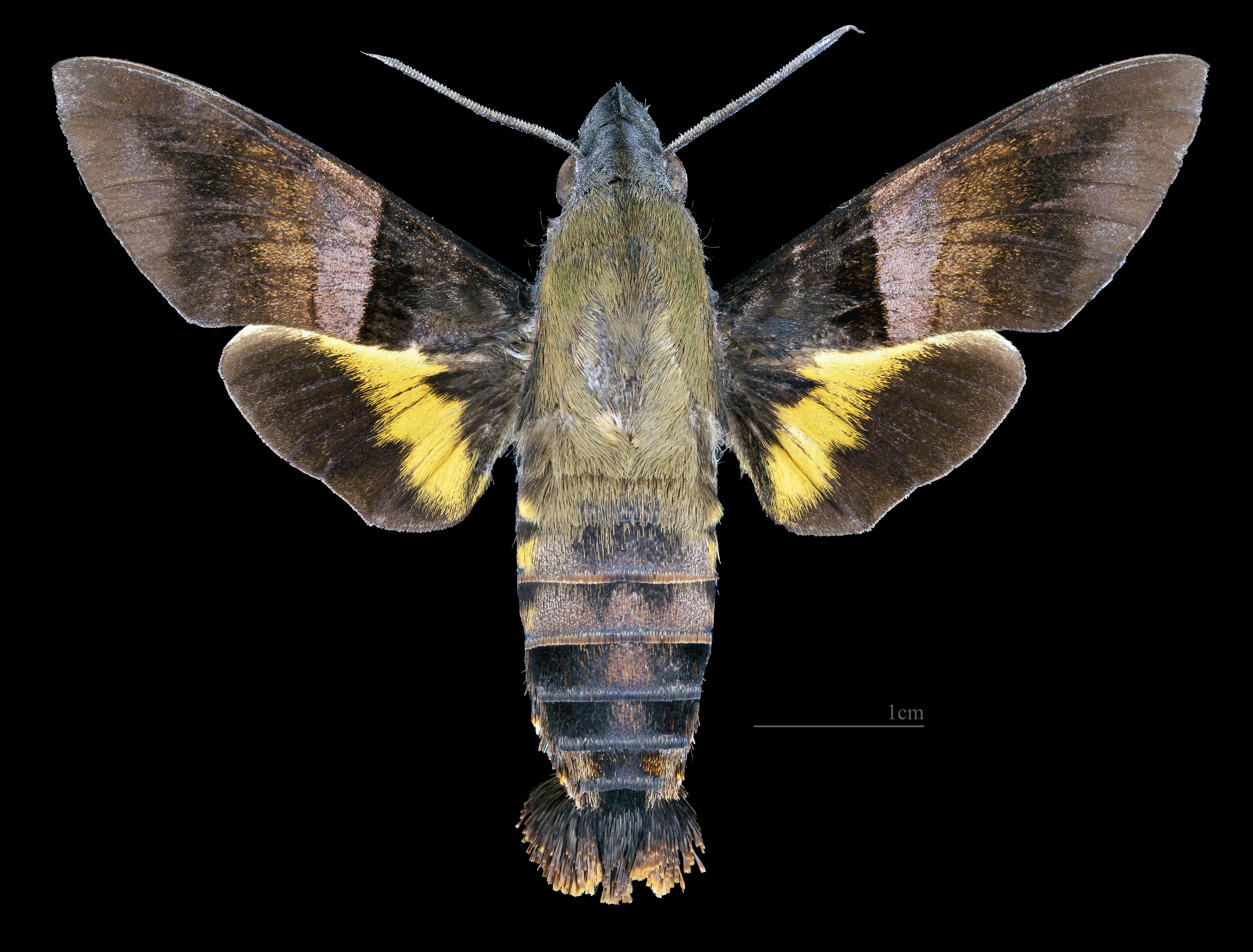
Macroglossum faro cottoni male dorsal

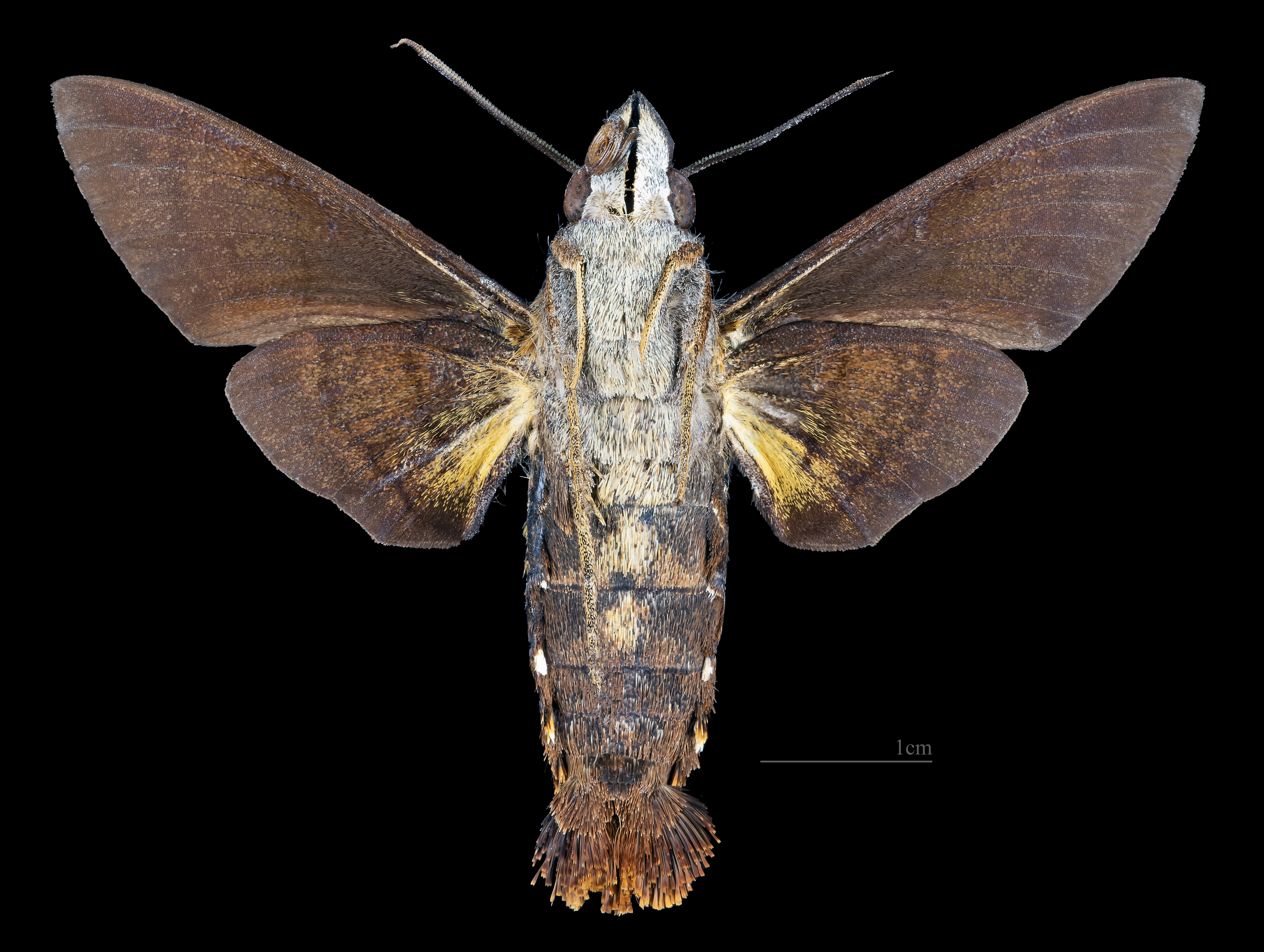
Macroglossum faro cottoni male venral
