= Angonyx williami =

Scientific classification
- Kingdom: Animalia
- Phylum: Arthropoda
- Class: Insecta
- Order: Lepidoptera
- Family: Sphingidae
- Genus: Angonyx
- Species: A. williami

Binomial name
- Angonyx williami Eitschberger & Melichar, 2009

Species of moth

Angonyx williami is a moth of the family Sphingidae. It is known from the Moluccas in Indonesia.
