= Angonyx krishna =

Scientific classification
- Kingdom: Animalia
- Phylum: Arthropoda
- Class: Insecta
- Order: Lepidoptera
- Family: Sphingidae
- Genus: Angonyx
- Species: A. krishna

Binomial name
- Angonyx krishna Eitschberger & Haxaire, 2006

Species of moth

Angonyx krishna, the southern dark-green hawkmoth, is a moth of the family Sphingidae. The species was first described by Ulf Eitschberger and Jean Haxaire in 2006. It is found in southern India and Sri Lanka.
