= Anolis darlingtoni =

Conservation status
- Critically Endangered (IUCN 3.1)

Scientific classification
- Kingdom: Animalia
- Phylum: Chordata
- Class: Reptilia
- Order: Squamata
- Suborder: Iguania
- Family: Dactyloidae
- Genus: Anolis
- Species: A. darlingtoni

Binomial name
- Anolis darlingtoni (Cochran, 1935)

Synonyms
- Xiphocercus darlingtoni Cochran, 1935; Anolis darlingtoni — Schwartz & Henderson, 1991; Deiroptyx darlingtoni — Nicholson et al., 2012

Species of lizard

Anolis darlingtoni, also known commonly as Darlington's anole and the La Hotte twig anole, is a species of lizard in the family Dactyloidae. The species is endemic to Haiti.

== Etymology ==
The specific name, darlingtoni, is in honor of American entomologist Philip Jackson Darlington Jr.

== Geographic range ==
A. darlingtoni is found in the Massif de la Hotte mountain range, Département du Sud, Haiti.

== Habitat ==
The preferred natural habitat of A. darlingtoni is forest, at elevations of 1,360–1,500 m (4,460–4,920 ft).

== Reproduction ==
A. darlingtoni is oviparous.
