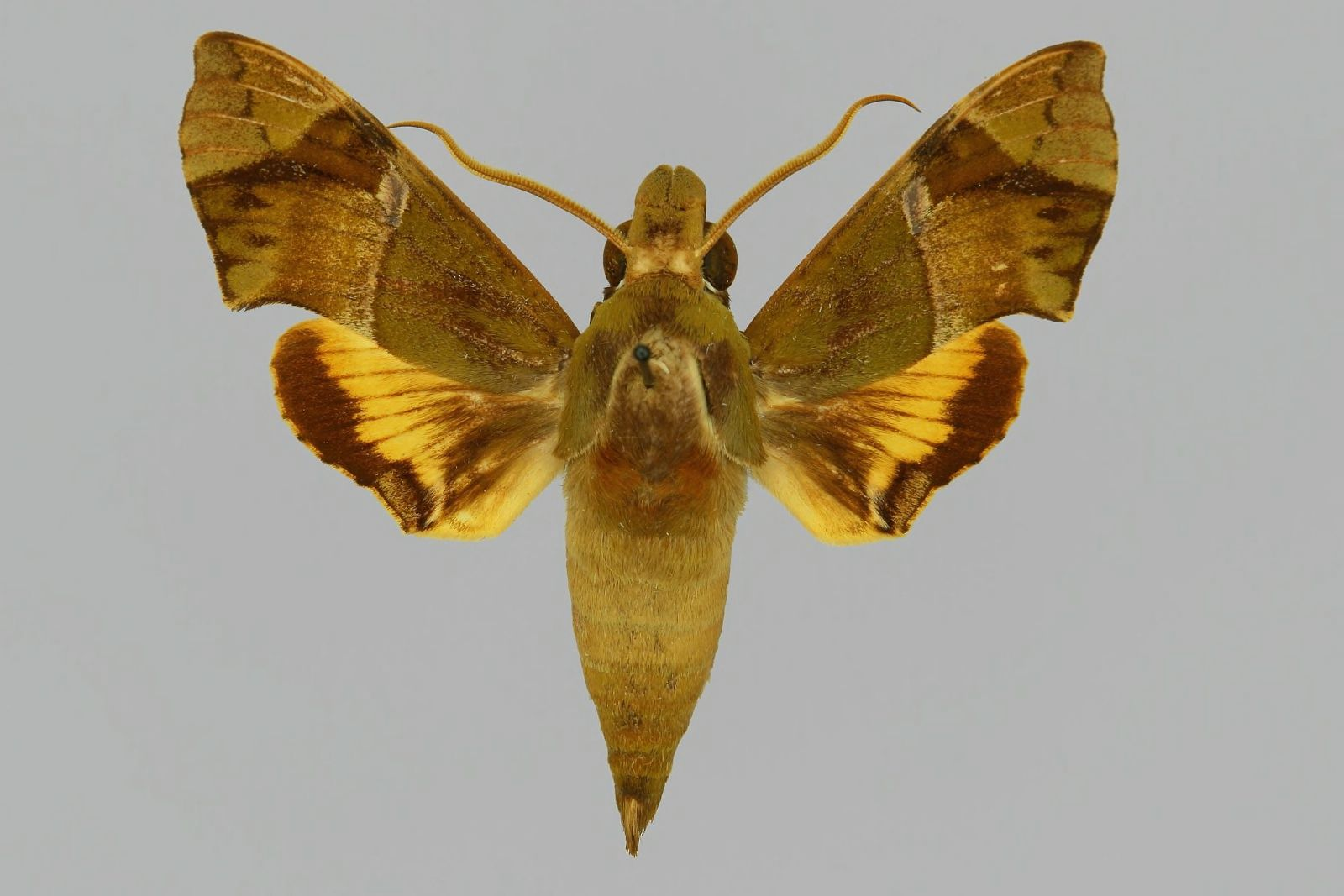

Scientific classification
- Domain: Eukaryota
- Kingdom: Animalia
- Phylum: Arthropoda
- Class: Insecta
- Order: Lepidoptera
- Family: Sphingidae
- Genus: Angonyx
- Species: A. meeki

Binomial name
- Angonyx meeki Rothschild & Jordan, 1903

= Angonyx meeki =

Species of moth

Angonyx meeki is a moth of the family Sphingidae. It is known from the Solomon Islands.
