= Ataenius picinus =

Scientific classification
- Kingdom: Animalia
- Phylum: Arthropoda
- Clade: Pancrustacea
- Class: Insecta
- Order: Coleoptera
- Suborder: Polyphaga
- Infraorder: Scarabaeiformia
- Family: Scarabaeidae
- Genus: Ataenius
- Species: A. picinus

Binomial name
- Ataenius picinus Harold, 1867

Synonyms
- Ataenius alegrus Balthasar, 1947; Ataenius boucomontii Paulian, 1937; Ataenius darlingtoni Paulian, 1934; Ataenius duplopunctatus Lea, 1923; Ataenius paracognatus Balthasar, 1961; Ataenius queirosii Paulian, 1934; Ataenius salutator Fall, 1930; Saprosites rugosus Richards, 1959

Species of beetle

Ataenius picinus, the pitchy scarab, is a species of aphodiine dung beetle in the family Scarabaeidae. It is found in Australia, Central America, North America, Oceania, and South America.

== Description ==
Adults reach a length of about 4.8–6 mm (0.19–0.24 in). They have an elongate, moderately convex, shiny body. They are black or reddish.

== Distribution ==
Nearctic: United States (Florida, North Carolina, South Carolina, Texas). Neotropical: Argentina, Bolivia, Brazil (Amazonas, Distrito Federal, Espírito Santo, Mato Grosso, Mato Grosso do Sul, Minas Gerais, Rio Grande do Sul, Santa Catarina, São Paulo, Tocantins), Chile, Costa Rica, Dominican Republic, Honduras, Martinique, Mexico (Chiapas, Veracruz), Paraguay, Peru, Uruguay. Australia: Australia (Queensland), New Zealand. Pacific: Fiji, New Caledonia, Vanuatu. Palaearctic: France (Corsica), Italy, Japan, Spain, Tunisia.

== Life history ==
The larvae have been recorded damaging seedlings, and adults may damage strawberries, potatoes and beans. Specimens are mostly collected in cow and sheep dung, leaf litter, compost heaps and soil, under carrion and stones, and sometimes in decaying fruit and mushrooms.
