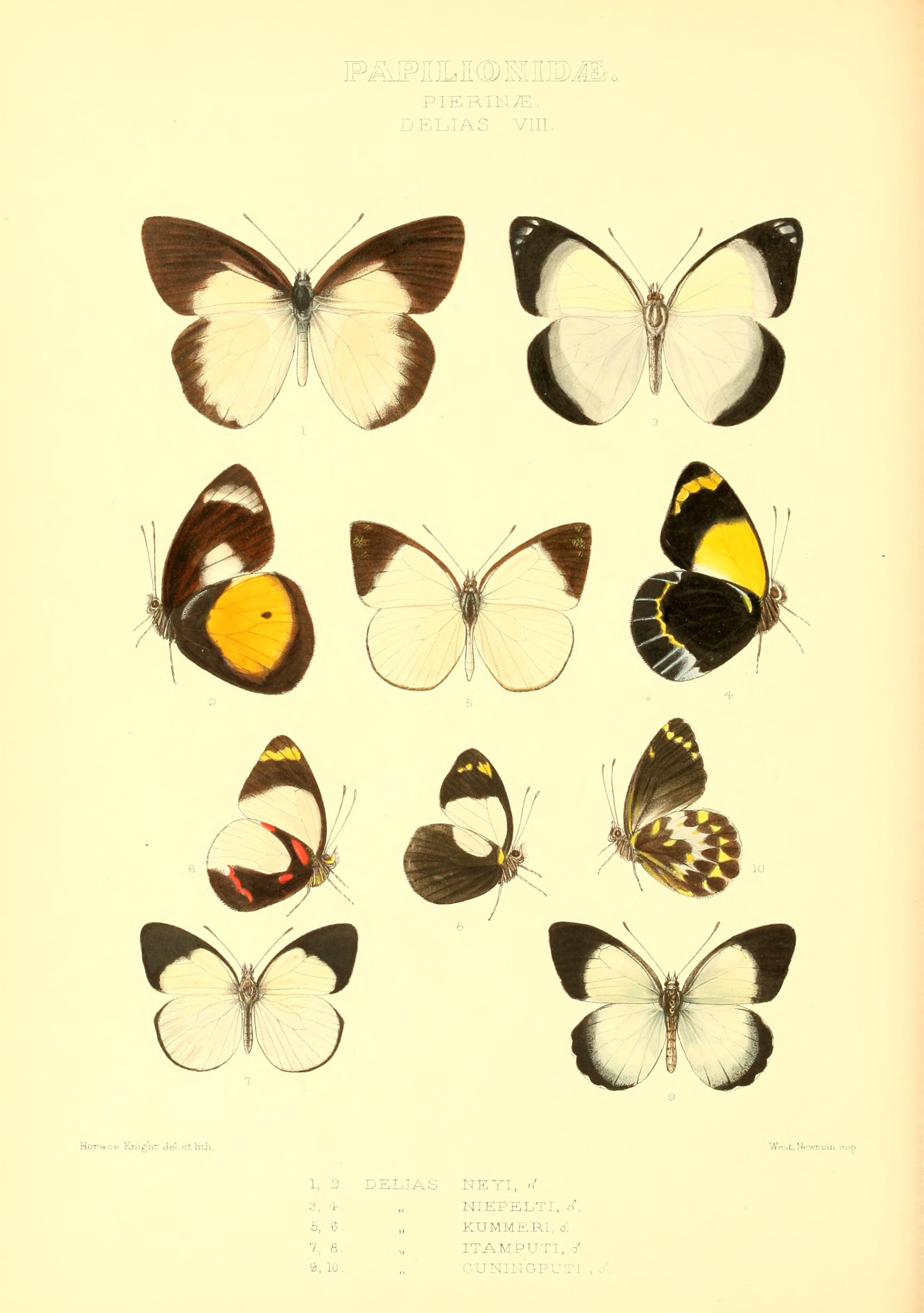
- Delias niepelti

Scientific classification
- Domain: Eukaryota
- Kingdom: Animalia
- Phylum: Arthropoda
- Class: Insecta
- Order: Lepidoptera
- Family: Pieridae
- Genus: Delias
- Species: D. niepelti

Binomial name
- Delias niepelti Ribbe, 1900

= Delias niepelti =

Species of butterfly

Delias niepelti is a butterfly in the family Pieridae. It was described by Carl Ribbe in 1900. It is endemic to New Guinea. The name honours Friedrich Wilhelm Niepelt.

The wingspan is about 68–76 mm for males and 62–80 mm for females. Adults can be distinguished from all others in the niepelti species group by the absence of a white costal patch on the underside of the hindwings.

== Subspecies ==
- D. n. niepelti (Central Highlands, Papua New Guinea)
- D. n. henki Yagishita, 1997 (Abmisibil, Irian Jaya)
