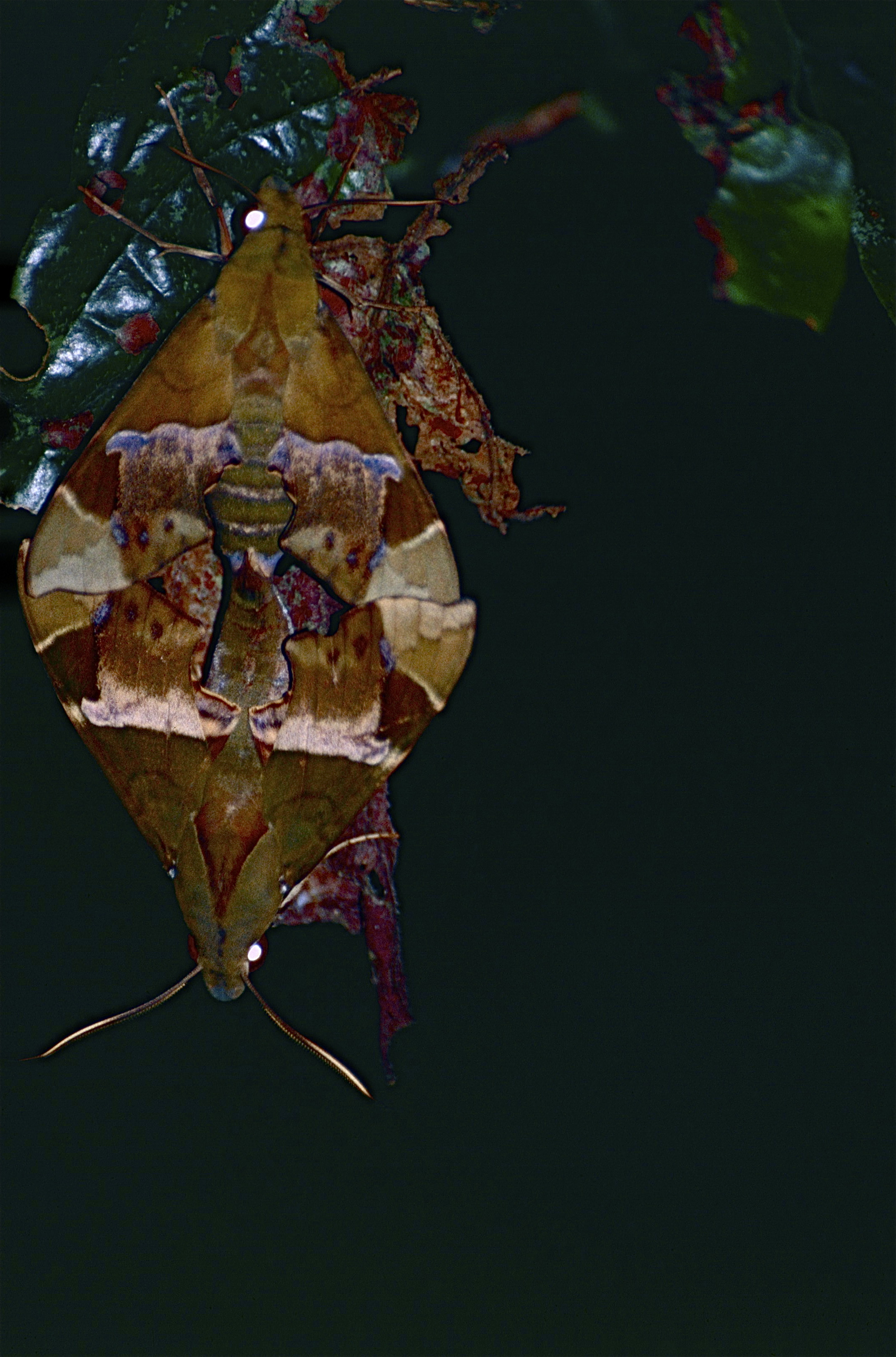
- Mating pair

Scientific classification
- Domain: Eukaryota
- Kingdom: Animalia
- Phylum: Arthropoda
- Class: Insecta
- Order: Lepidoptera
- Family: Sphingidae
- Genus: Angonyx
- Species: A. papuana

Binomial name
- Angonyx papuana Rothschild & Jordan, 1903

Synonyms
- Angonyx serrata Clark, 1928

= Angonyx papuana =

Species of moth

Angonyx papuana is a moth of the family Sphingidae.

== Distribution ==
It is known from Papua New Guinea, northern Queensland and the Bismarck Archipelago.

== Subspecies ==
- Angonyx papuana papuana
- Angonyx papuana bismarcki B.P. Clark, 1929 (New Ireland, Bismarck Archipelago)
