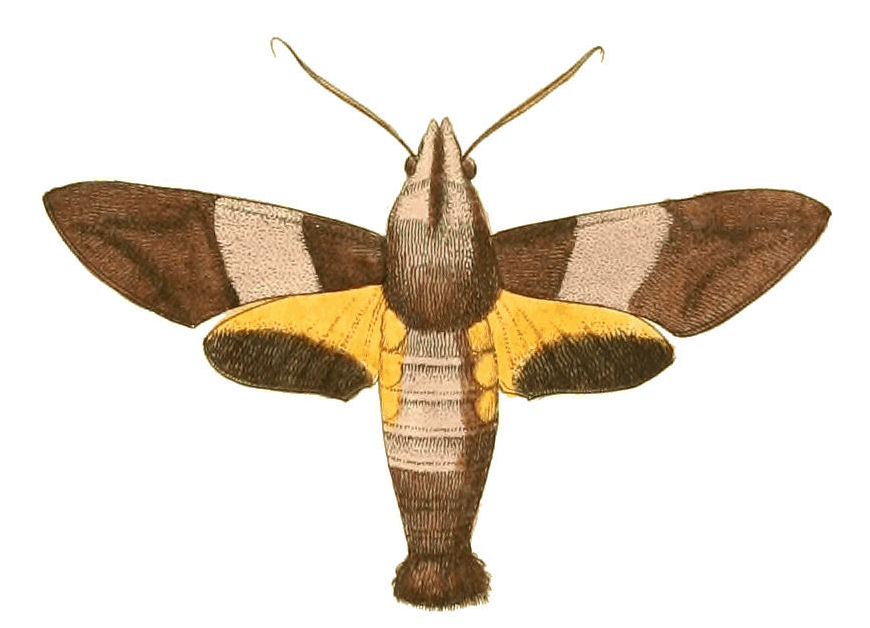

Scientific classification
- Kingdom: Animalia
- Phylum: Arthropoda
- Class: Insecta
- Order: Lepidoptera
- Family: Sphingidae
- Genus: Macroglossum
- Species: M. passalus

Binomial name
- Macroglossum passalus (Drury, 1773)

Synonyms
- Sphinx passalus Drury, 1773; Sphinx pandora Fabricius, 1793; Rhamphoschisma rectifascia R. Felder, 1874; Macroglossum rhebus Moore, 1858; Macroglossa sturnus Boisduval, 1875

= Macroglossum passalus =

Species of moth

Macroglossum passalus, the black-based hummingbird hawkmoth, is a moth of the family Sphingidae described by Dru Drury in 1773. It is known from Sri Lanka, India, Thailand, south-eastern China, Taiwan, southern Japan, Indonesia (Sumatra, Java) and the Philippines.

The wingspan is 52–62 mm. Adults are attracted to the flowers of Duranta erecta and Lantana camara. They are on wing at dawn and dusk.

Larvae have been recorded feeding on Daphniphyllum calycinum in Hong Kong, Photinia glabra in Japan and Photinia lindleyana in India.

== Description ==
Upperside: antennae brown, and thickest near their extremities. Head and thorax greyish brown, with a dark line running down the middle. Abdomen red brown, with two yellow spots on each side. Tail broad and hairy. Anterior wings, next the body, dark chocolate, occupying a third part; next to this they are of a light red brown, growing darker as it approaches the tips. Inferior wings yellow next the shoulders; the apical half being of a fine dark chocolate.

Underside: head white. Tongue curled up. Breast and thighs yellow clay coloured. Legs, sides, and abdomen dark clay coloured. Wings, next the body, yellow clay coloured; the remaining parts being red brown, with a faint darker border along the external edges. Wingspan 2 inches (50 mm).
