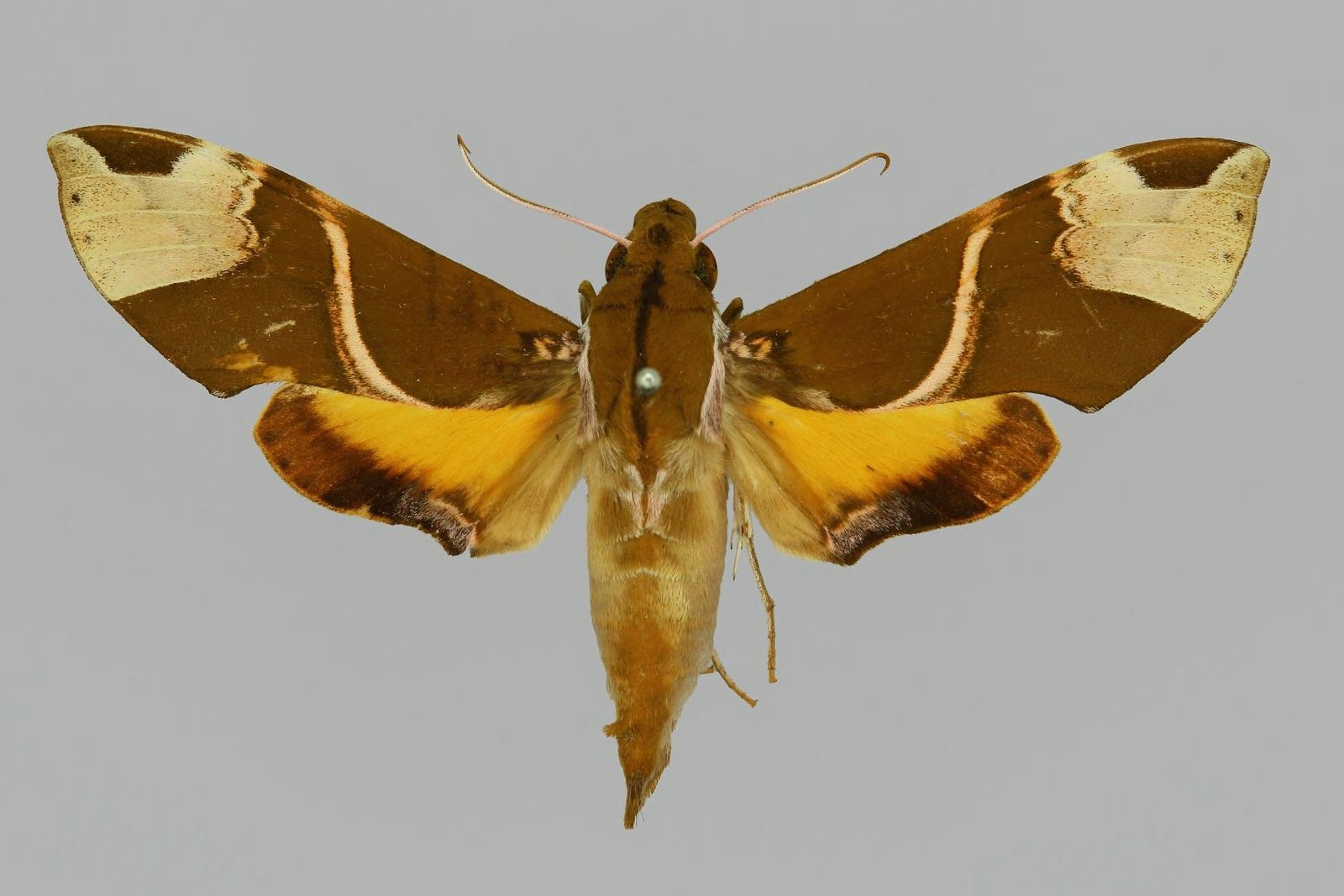

Scientific classification
- Kingdom: Animalia
- Phylum: Arthropoda
- Class: Insecta
- Order: Lepidoptera
- Family: Sphingidae
- Genus: Pseudoangonyx; Eitschberger, 2010
- Species: P. excellens

Binomial name
- Pseudoangonyx excellens (Rothschild, 1911)

Synonyms
- Panacra excellens Rothschild, 1911; Angonyx excellens; Panacra excellens darlingtoni Clark, 1935; Agonyx darlingtoni

= Pseudoangonyx =

Genus of moths

Pseudoangonyx is a monotypic moth genus in the family Sphingidae described by Ulf Eitschberger in 2010. Its only species, Pseudoangonyx excellens, described by Walter Rothschild in 1911, is known from Aru, Papua New Guinea and northern Queensland. The adult moths have forewings that each have a bold pattern of pale and dark green, and a curved white stripe. The green fades to brown in dead specimens. Information about the caterpillars and pupae of this species is deficient.
