= Delias ennia =

Scientific classification
- Kingdom: Animalia
- Phylum: Arthropoda
- Clade: Pancrustacea
- Class: Insecta
- Order: Lepidoptera
- Family: Pieridae
- Genus: Delias
- Species: D. ennia

Binomial name
- Delias ennia (Wallace, 1867)

Synonyms
- Thyca ennia Wallace, 1867; Delias dorothea Mitis, 1893; Delias theodora Tindale, 1927; Pieris jobiana Oberthür, 1894; Delias xelianthe Grose-Smith, 1900; Delias nigidius Miskin, 1884; Delias tindalii Joicey & Talbot, 1926

Species of butterfly

Delias ennia, the yellow-banded Jezebel, is a butterfly in the family Pieridae. It is found in Australia, Indonesia, Papua New Guinea and several surrounding islands.

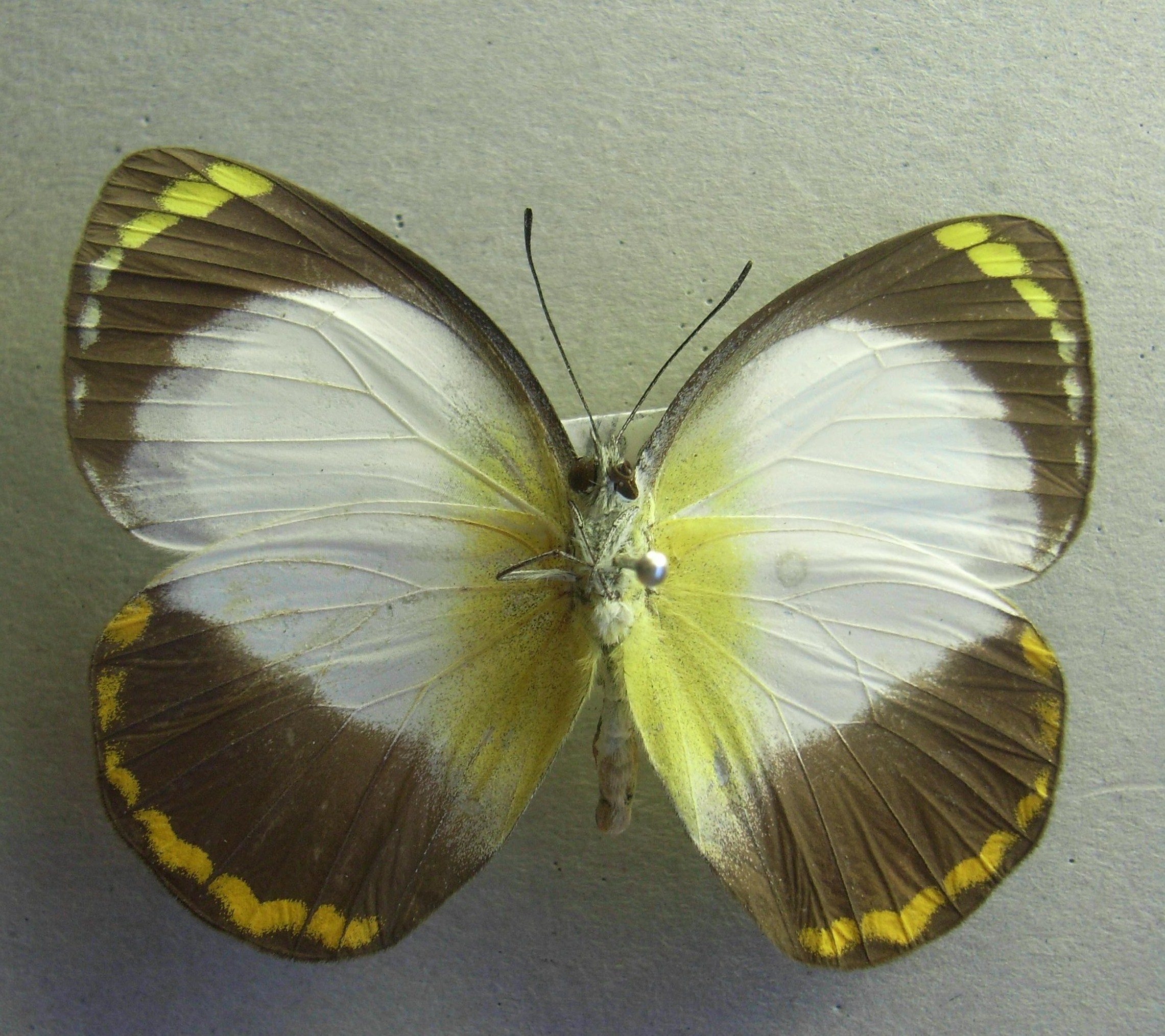

== Description ==
original Thyca ennia, n. sp. (Pl. VII. fig. 4, male, female)

Male.—Above, white, upper wings with the costa dusky, and a black border at the apex regularly curved within, enclosing two small white spots and terminating in a point at the outer angle; Lower wings with a narrow hind border, not reaching the outer angle. Beneath: a row of five apical spots, the two uppermost of which are largest and yellow, the base of the lower wings yellow tinged, and the hind border enclosing a line of narrow yellow spots. Female.—Above, white, with a much broader dusky border to the anal angle, the base of the uppers dusky, and a band at the end of the cell connecting the costa with the outer border. Beneath, there is a band of six spots near the outer margin of the uppers, the second and third being larger and yellow; the base of the wings, the anal margin, and several marks between the nervures, are also yellow; the posterior band is much broader, its inner margin straight and just beyond the end of the cell, and has a submarginal row of six horizontal yellow spots. Expanse of wings 2 and 3/8 to 2 and 5/8 inches.The wingspan is 50 mm. Hab.—Waigiou (Coll. Wall.).

This is very near dice, which seems intermediate between this and gabia. It is curious that all should be found in the same small island. The upper side of. dice is, according to Vollenhoven’s description, like my male, and the under side like my female.

The larvae feed on Notothixos leiophyllus. The larvae spread silk around the leaves where they are feeding.

== Subspecies ==
- Delias ennia ennia
- Delias ennia mysolensis Rothschild, 1915 (Waigeu, north-eastern West Irian, northern West Irian)
- Delias ennia multicolor Joicey & Noakes, 1915 (Misool Island)
- Delias ennia iere Grose-Smith, 1900 (Noemfoor Island)
- Delias ennia jobiana (Oberthür, 1894) (Jobi Island)
- Delias ennia oetakwensis Rothschild, 1915 (West Irian (Snow Mountains))
- Delias ennia xelianthe Grose-Smith, 1900 (Papua (Milne Bay))
- Delias ennia saturata Rothschild, 1915 (Goodenough Island)
- Delias ennia limbata Rothschild, 1915 (Tagula Island, Louisiades)
- Delias ennia nigidius Miskin, 1884 - Nigidius Jezabel (Cairns to Queensland)
- Delias ennia tindalii Joicey & Talbot, 1926 (Queensland)

== Taxonomy ==
ennia is a member of the Delias isse species group.

== Gallery ==

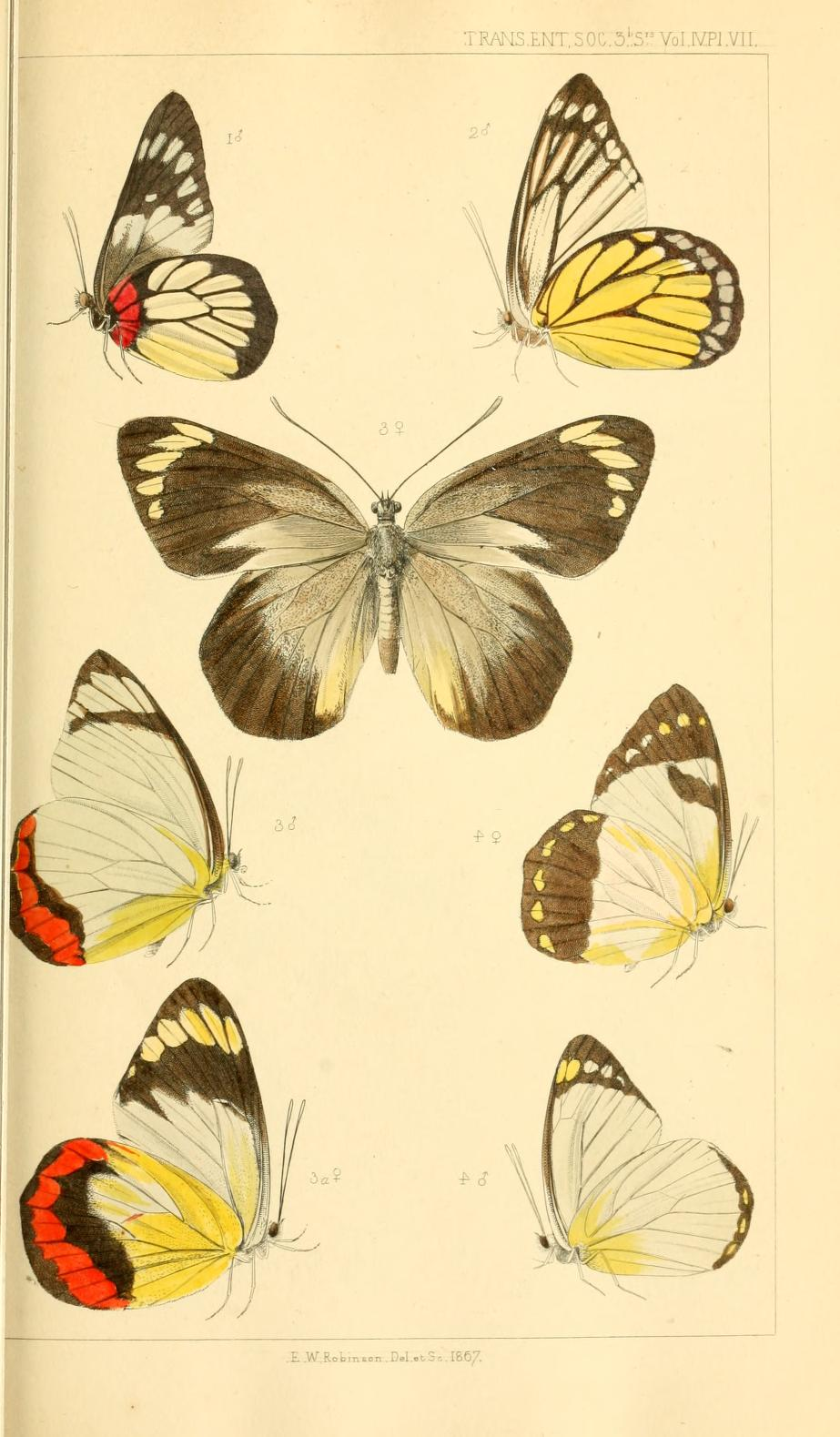
