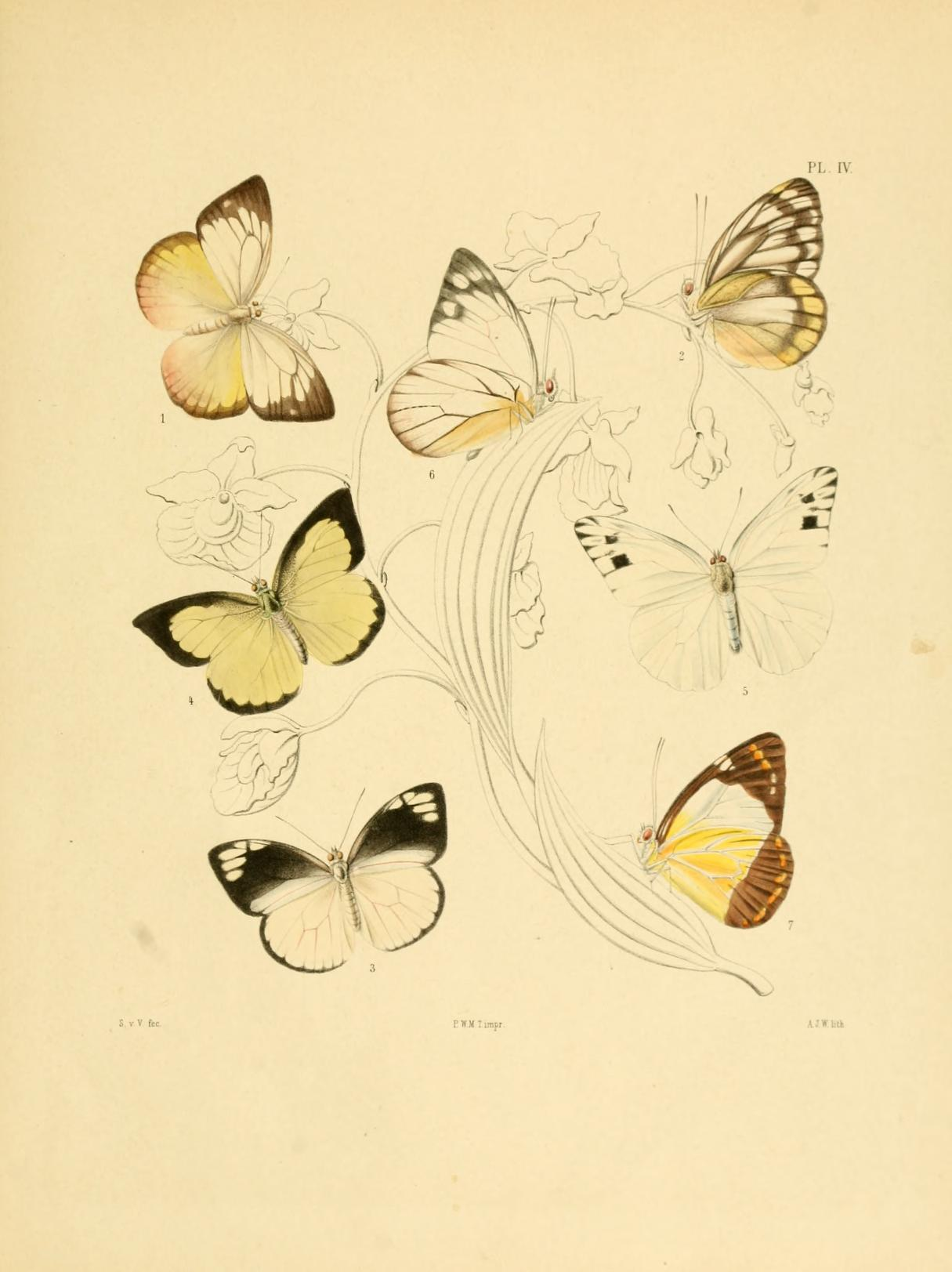
- In Vollenhoven's Essai d'une Faune Entomologique de l'Archipel Indo-Néerlandais

Scientific classification
- Kingdom: Animalia
- Phylum: Arthropoda
- Class: Insecta
- Order: Lepidoptera
- Family: Pieridae
- Genus: Delias
- Species: D. dice

Binomial name
- Delias dice (Vollenhoven, 1865

Synonyms
- Pieris dice Vollenhoven, 1865; Delias mitisana Strand, 1916; Delias mitisana ab. pictula Strand, 1916; Delias mitisana f. leucana Strand, 1916; Delias dice f. nigroapicalis Roepke 1955

= Delias dice =

Species of butterfly

Delias dice is a butterfly in the family Pieridae. It was described by Samuel Constantinus Snellen van Vollenhoven in 1865. It is endemic to New Guinea in the Australasian realm.

== Subspecies ==
- Delias dice dice (Central Irian Jaya) On the under surface of the female the black distal area of the hindwing is widened, sharply defined proximally and bears, like the apical area of the forewing, a row of 5—-6 yellowish patches in the middle.
- Delias dice fulvoflava Rothschild, 1915 (Snow Mtns, Irian Jaya)
- Delias dice latimarginata Joicey & Talbot, 1925 (Weyland Mtns, Irian Jaya)
- Delias dice mitisana Strand, 1916 (Vogelkop, Irian Jaya & Waigeu Island)
- Delias dice rectifascia Talbot, 1928 (Rossel Island)
- Delias dice samarai Joicey & Talbot, 1916 (south-western Papua New Guinea)

== Taxonomy ==
Delias dice is a member of the nyse species group.
