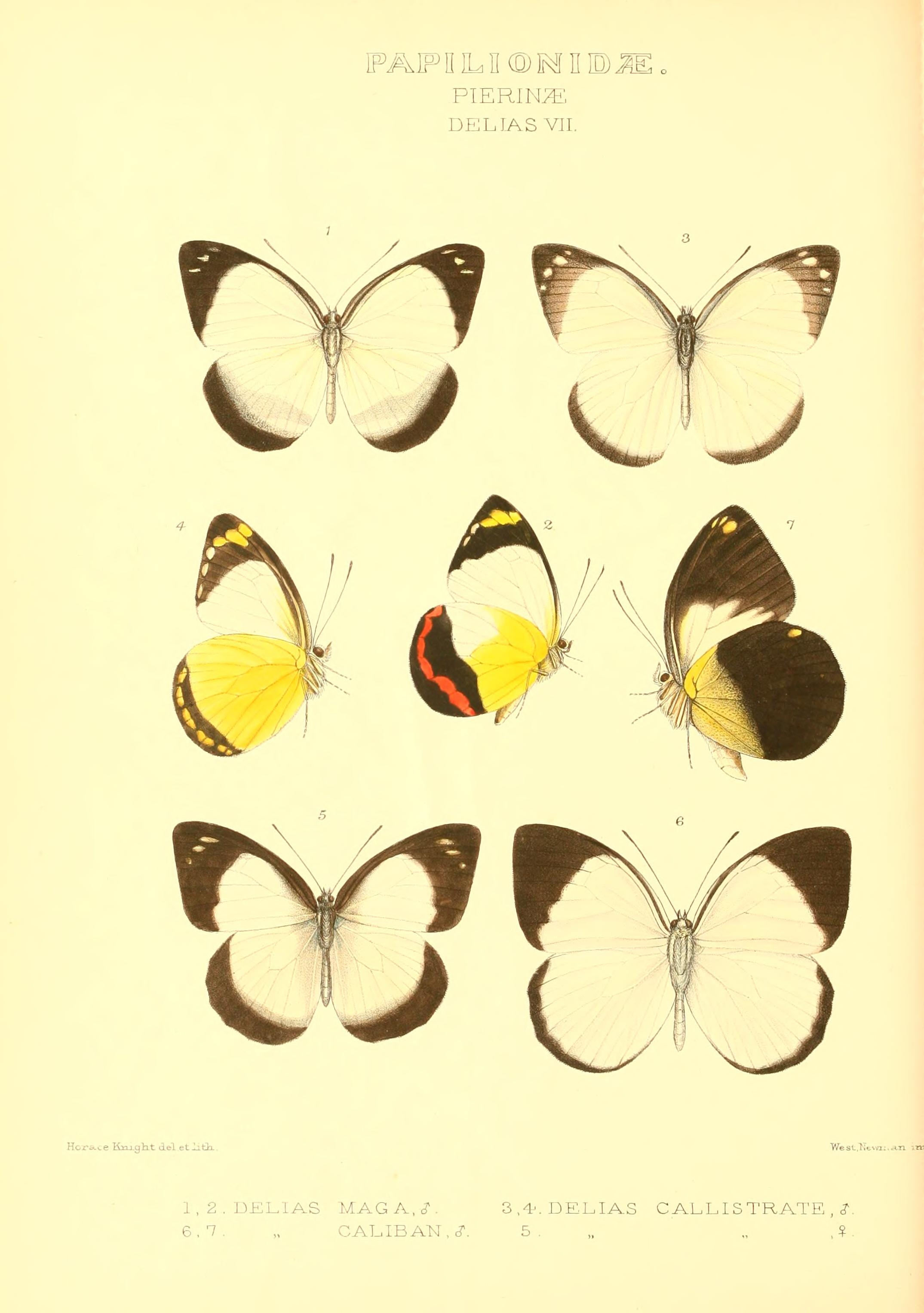
- In Henley Grose-Smith and William Forsell Kirby's Rhopalocera exotica

Scientific classification
- Domain: Eukaryota
- Kingdom: Animalia
- Phylum: Arthropoda
- Class: Insecta
- Order: Lepidoptera
- Family: Pieridae
- Genus: Delias
- Species: D. gabia

Binomial name
- Delias gabia (Boisduval, 1832)

Synonyms
- Pieris gabia Boisduval, 1832; Delias gabia felsina Fruhstorfer, 1910; Delias gabia marinda Hulst, 1924; Delias gabia aurantimacula Joicey & Talbot, 1922

= Delias gabia =

Species of butterfly

Delias gabia is a butterfly in the family Pieridae. It was described by Jean Baptiste Boisduval in 1832. It is endemic to New Guinea.

The wingspan is about 52–58 mm.

== Subspecies ==
- D. g. gabia (New Guinea, Waigeu, Gebe Island)
- D. g. bantina Fruhstorfer, 1910 (Trobriand)
- D. g. callistrate Grose-Smith, 1897 (Fergusson, Goodenough Island)
- D. g. masinessa Fruhstorfer, 1913 (Yule)
- D. g. naokoae Nakano, 1995 (Yapen Island)
- D. g. zarate Grose-Smith, 1900 (New Guinea, Trobriand Islands, Yule Island)
