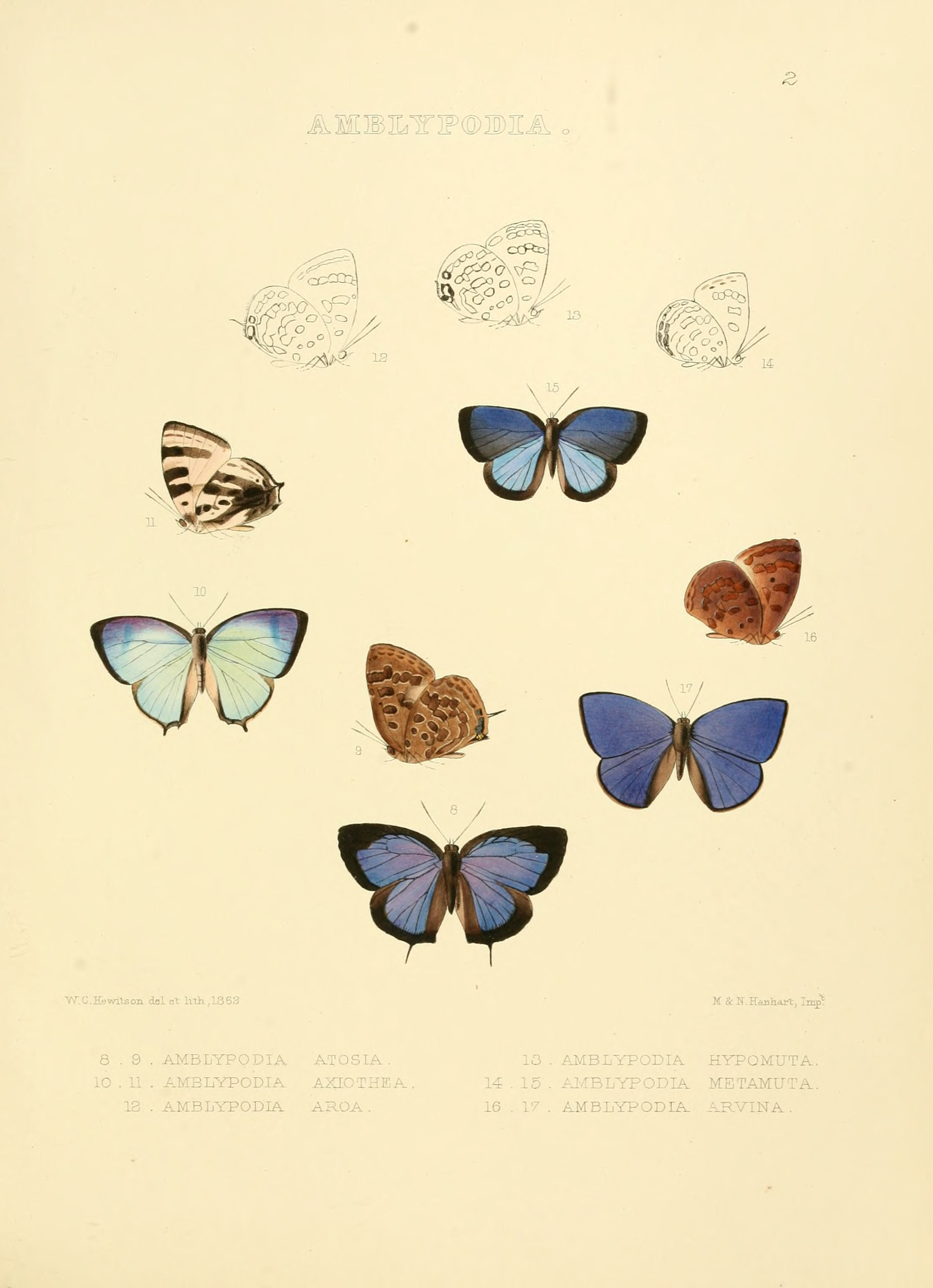
- Arhopala axiothea in Illustrations of diurnal Lepidoptera

Scientific classification
- Kingdom: Animalia
- Phylum: Arthropoda
- Clade: Pancrustacea
- Class: Insecta
- Order: Lepidoptera
- Family: Lycaenidae
- Genus: Arhopala
- Species: A. axiothea

Binomial name
- Arhopala axiothea (Hewitson, 1869])

= Arhopala axiothea =

Species of butterfly

Arhopala axiothea is a butterfly in the family Lycaenidae. It was described by William Chapman Hewitson in 1863. It is found in the Australasian realm where it is endemic to New Guinea.

== Description ==
This species also deviates more than most of the other species of the genus from the type of Amblypodia, though above it resembles the brightly glistening Arhopala azeniaand its allies from the same patria, but the under surface is light yellowish-or reddish-white with blackish-brown, compact bands.
