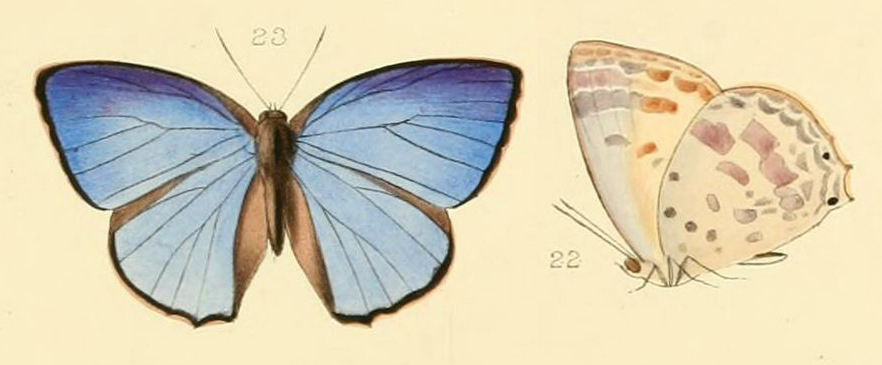
- Arhopala azenia azenia
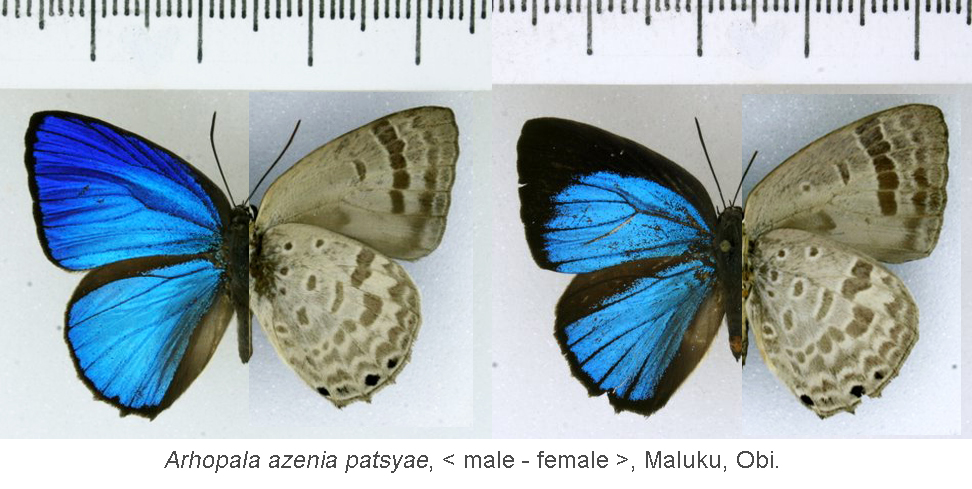
- Arhopala azenia patsyae

Scientific classification
- Kingdom: Animalia
- Phylum: Arthropoda
- Clade: Pancrustacea
- Class: Insecta
- Order: Lepidoptera
- Family: Lycaenidae
- Genus: Arhopala
- Species: A. azenia

Binomial name
- Arhopala azenia Hewitson, 1863

= Arhopala azenia =

Species of butterfly

Arhopala azenia is a butterfly in the family Lycaenidae. It was described by William Chapman Hewitson in 1863. It is found in the Australasian realm.

Discernible by the radiantly Morpho-blue upper surface with a very narrow dark distal margin; the under surface is quite light, almost dull white, the scanty marking dull lilac-grey or brownish-grey.

== Subspecies ==
- Arhopala azenia azenia (Aru, Obi, Serang, Waigeu, Misool, Jobi, West Irian to Papua)
- Arhopala azenia patsyae Tennent & Rawlins, 2010 (Obi)
