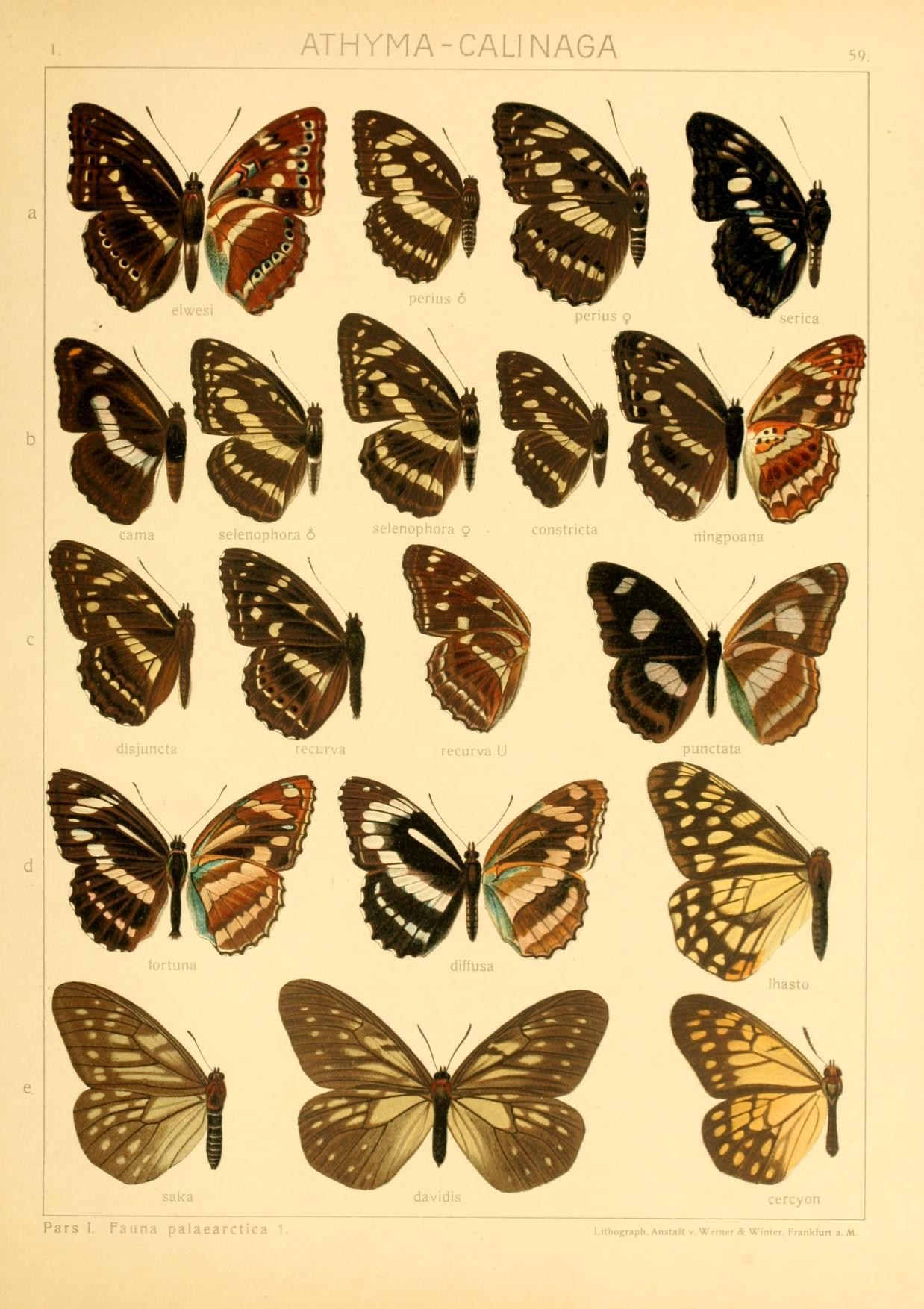
- Calinaga cercyon in Seitz (59e)

Scientific classification
- Domain: Eukaryota
- Kingdom: Animalia
- Phylum: Arthropoda
- Class: Insecta
- Order: Lepidoptera
- Family: Nymphalidae
- Genus: Calinaga
- Species: C. cercyon

Binomial name
- Calinaga cercyon de Nicéville, 1897

= Calinaga cercyon =

Species of butterfly

Calinaga cercyon is a butterfly found in the Palearctic that belongs to the browns family. It is endemic to West China and East Tibet.

== Description from Seitz ==
C. cercyon Nicev. (59e) has the markings quite similar to [saka Moore form of Calinaga buddha] -, but the ground is yellowish; moreover, the position of the distal spots of the forewing is somewhat different, so that we apparently have to do with a distinct species.— West China: Ta-tsien-lu.
