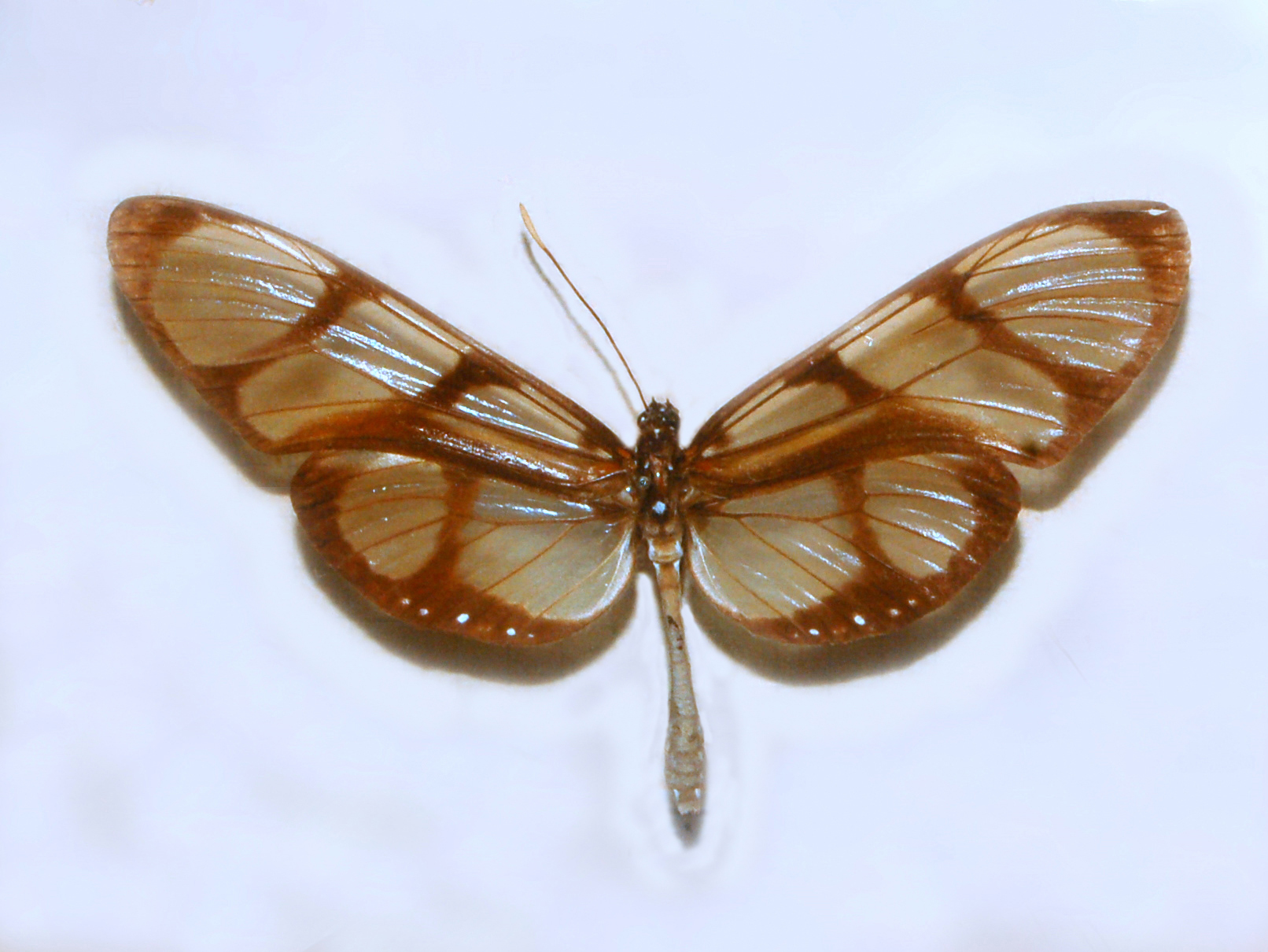
- Methona confusa psamathe from Peru. Mounted specimen
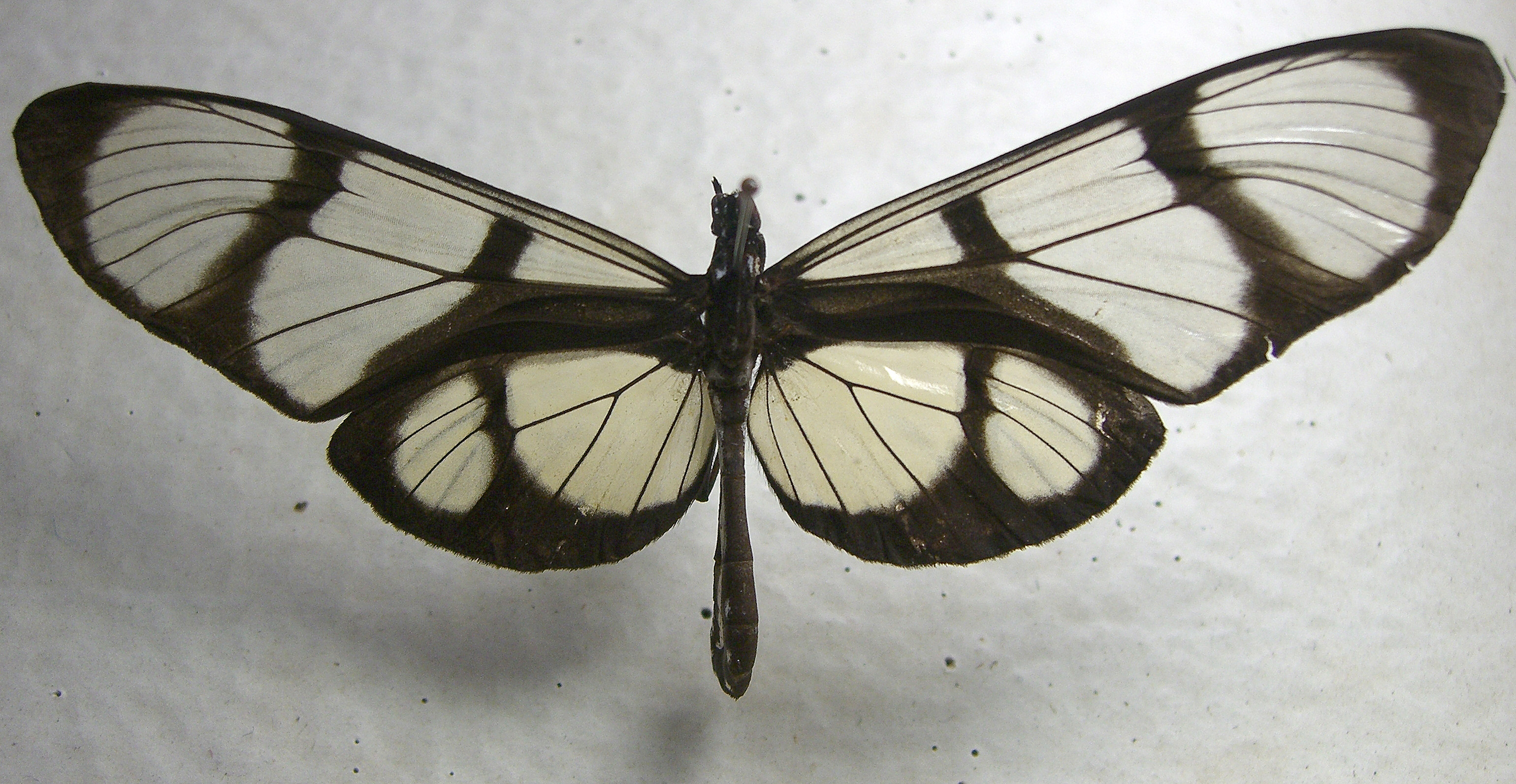
- Male of Methona confusa

Scientific classification
- Kingdom: Animalia
- Phylum: Arthropoda
- Class: Insecta
- Order: Lepidoptera
- Family: Nymphalidae
- Genus: Methona
- Species: M. confusa

Binomial name
- Methona confusa Butler, 1873

Synonyms
- Thyridia confusa denigrata Talbot, 1932

= Methona confusa =

Species of butterfly

Methona confusa, the giant glasswing, is a species of clearwinged butterfly in the order Lepidoptera and in the family Nymphalidae. It can be found in some Central and South American countries in regions with forests and mountains.

== Taxonomy ==
Methona confusa is in the order Lepidoptera and in the family Nymphalidae. The subfamily is Danainae while it is still not certain where the genus, Methona fits within the Ithomiini tribe. There are 4 subspecies of M. confusa. Two of the subspecies are Methona confusa confusa and Methona confusa psamathe.

== Description ==
Methona confusa has a wingspan of about 11 cm. The wings do not have nanostructures and thus are transparent and reflective. It has black margins and black cross-bars on the forewings and the hindwings. Small white spots are present along the margin of the wing on the underside of the wing while there are also white spots on the abdomen and the thorax. Antennae are black with a yellow tip. M. confusa display Müllerian mimicry and Batesian mimicry through their wings.

== Life cycle and behavior ==
To develop from an egg to an adult, it takes M. confusa about 45 days. The white eggs are found in clusters on the bottom side of Brunfelsia (Solanaceae). Some species of Methona could be monophagous. M. confusa and M. curvifascia have similar larval appearances. M. confusa has 12 stripes on the body while M. curvifascia has 11. M. confusa as an instar has dark brown and yellow stripes transversely across the body. As a pupa, it has a black cremaster and the wing pads have a black and gold color a couple days before emerging as an adult. This pupa stage lasts around 12 days.

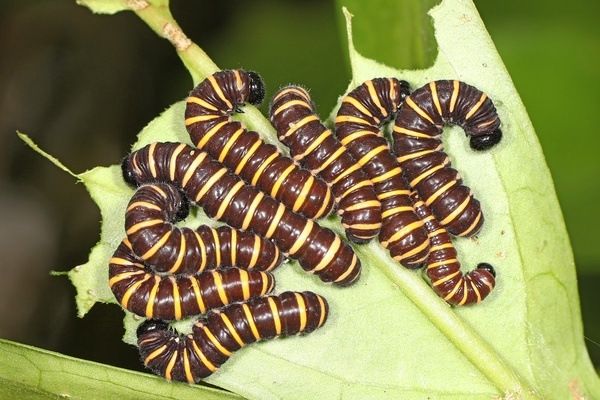
M. confusa as larvae

For mating, males will copulate with the female in two sequences. The male would grab onto the female where they would fall to the ground. In the second sequence, the male would leap onto the female while flying.

Methona confusa has also been known to display gregarious behavior as larvae and summit congregation behavior.

== Distribution ==
This species can be found in Brazil, Ecuador, Panama, Peru, Venezuela, Bolivia, Argentina, and Colombia. Specifically, M. confusa can be found in the Amazon basin. The population of M. confusa has been declining which could be due to the predation during the larval stage from ants and birds. During the pupal stage, they are impacted by parasitoid wasps (Eulophidae) and fungi.

== Habitat ==
This species is often found in montane forests and mountains such as the Andes with elevations as high as 3,500 meters. Unideal habitats that they have been found in are wet grasslands/punas.
