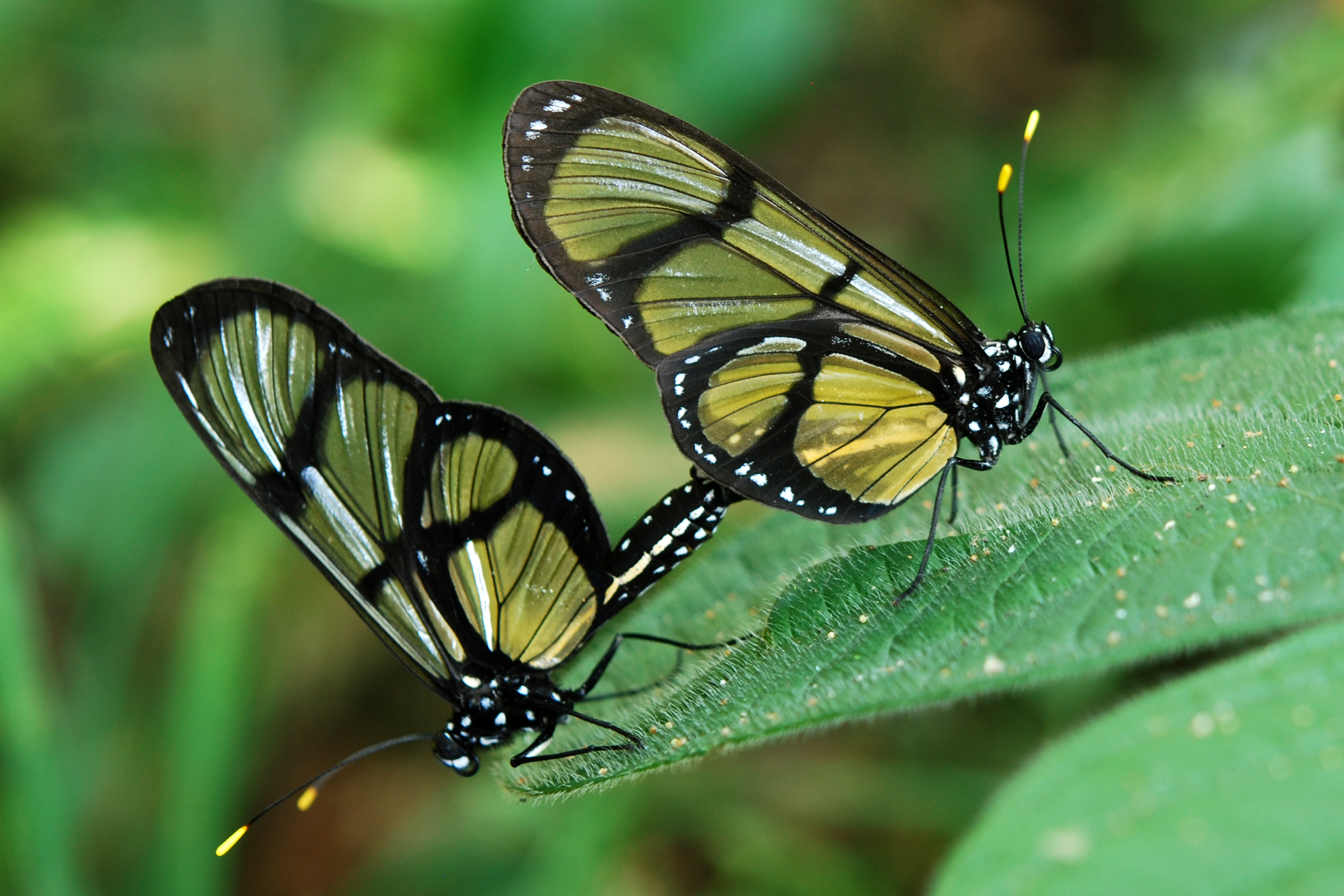
- Methona confusa

Scientific classification
- Domain: Eukaryota
- Kingdom: Animalia
- Phylum: Arthropoda
- Class: Insecta
- Order: Lepidoptera
- Family: Nymphalidae
- Tribe: Ithomiini
- Genus: Methona; Doubleday, [1847]

Species
- See text

Synonyms
- Gelotophye d'Almeida, 1940

= Methona =

Genus of brush-footed butterflies

Methona is a genus of clearwing (ithomiine) butterflies, named by Edward Doubleday in 1847. They are in the brush-footed butterfly family, Nymphalidae.

== Species ==
Arranged alphabetically:

- Methona confusa Butler, 1873
- Methona curvifascia Weymer, 1883
- Methona grandior (Forbes, 1944)
- Methona maxima (Forbes, 1944)
- Methona megisto C. & R. Felder, 1860
- Methona singularis (Staudinger, [1884])
- Methona themisto (Hübner, 1818)
