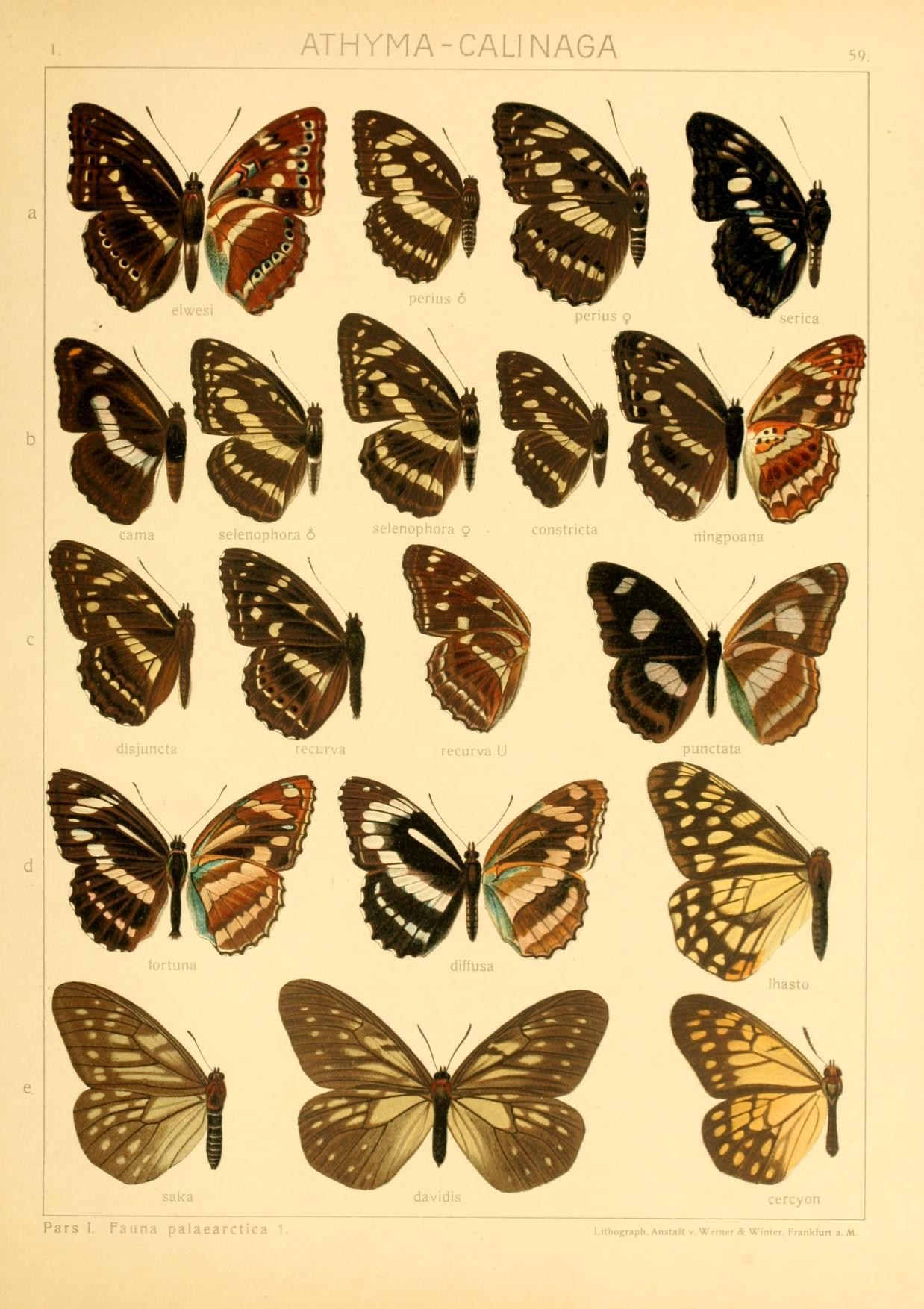
- Calinaga lhatso in Seitz (59d)

Scientific classification
- Domain: Eukaryota
- Kingdom: Animalia
- Phylum: Arthropoda
- Class: Insecta
- Order: Lepidoptera
- Family: Nymphalidae
- Genus: Calinaga
- Species: C. lhatso

Binomial name
- Calinaga lhatso Oberthür, 1893

= Calinaga lhatso =

Species of butterfly

Calinaga lhatso is a butterfly found in the Palearctic that belongs to the browns family (Nymphalidae). The species was first described by Charles Oberthür in 1893. It is endemic to China (Shaanxi, Yunnan and Tibet).

== Description from Seitz ==
C. lhatso Oberthür (59d) is likewise yellowish; the longitudinal and transverse stripes dark brown, before the distal margin there appear diffuse lunules on the forewing and distinctly pale yellow ones on the hindwing, the latter bearing an orange-yellow spot at the anal angle. East Tibet: Tse-kou.
