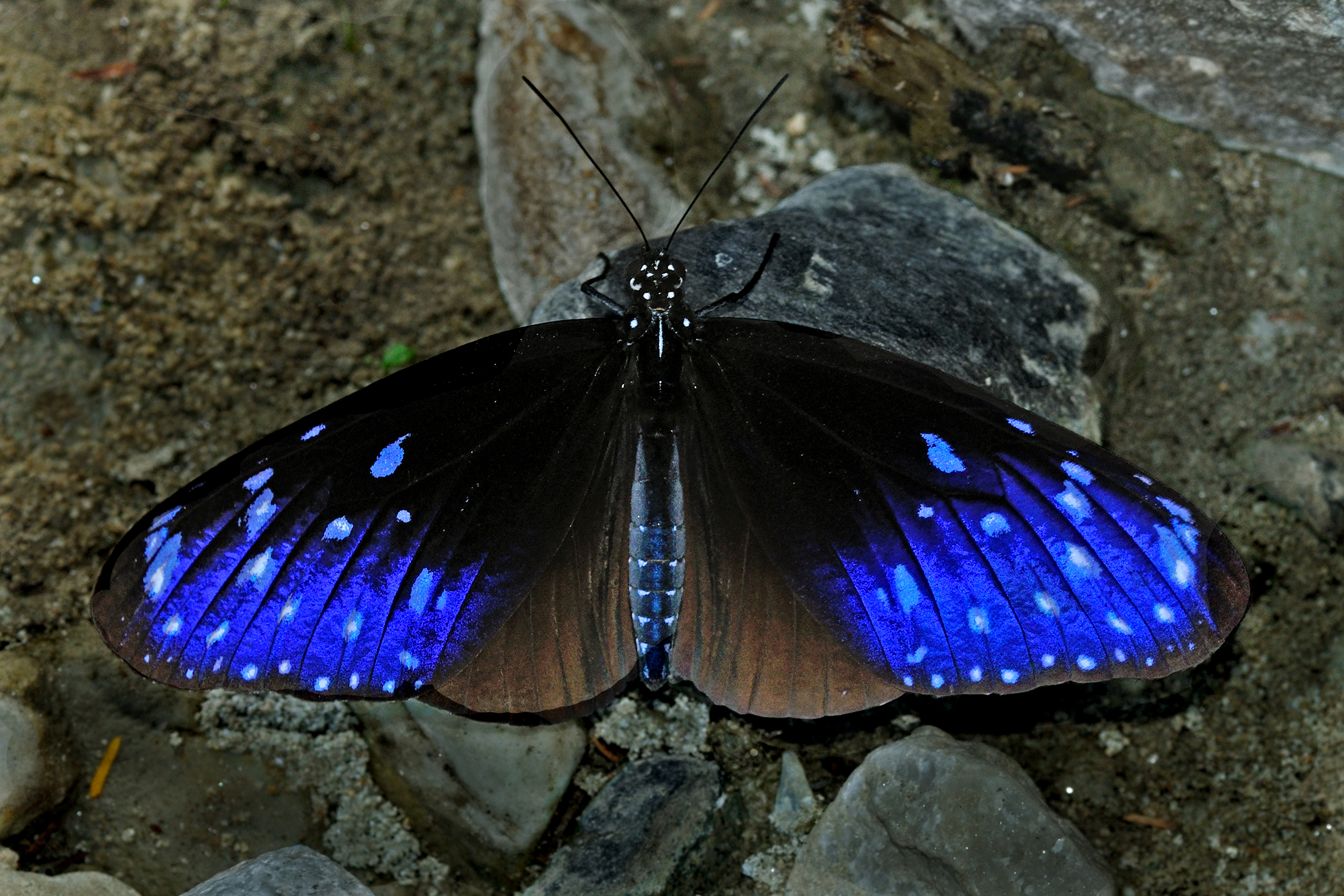
- male
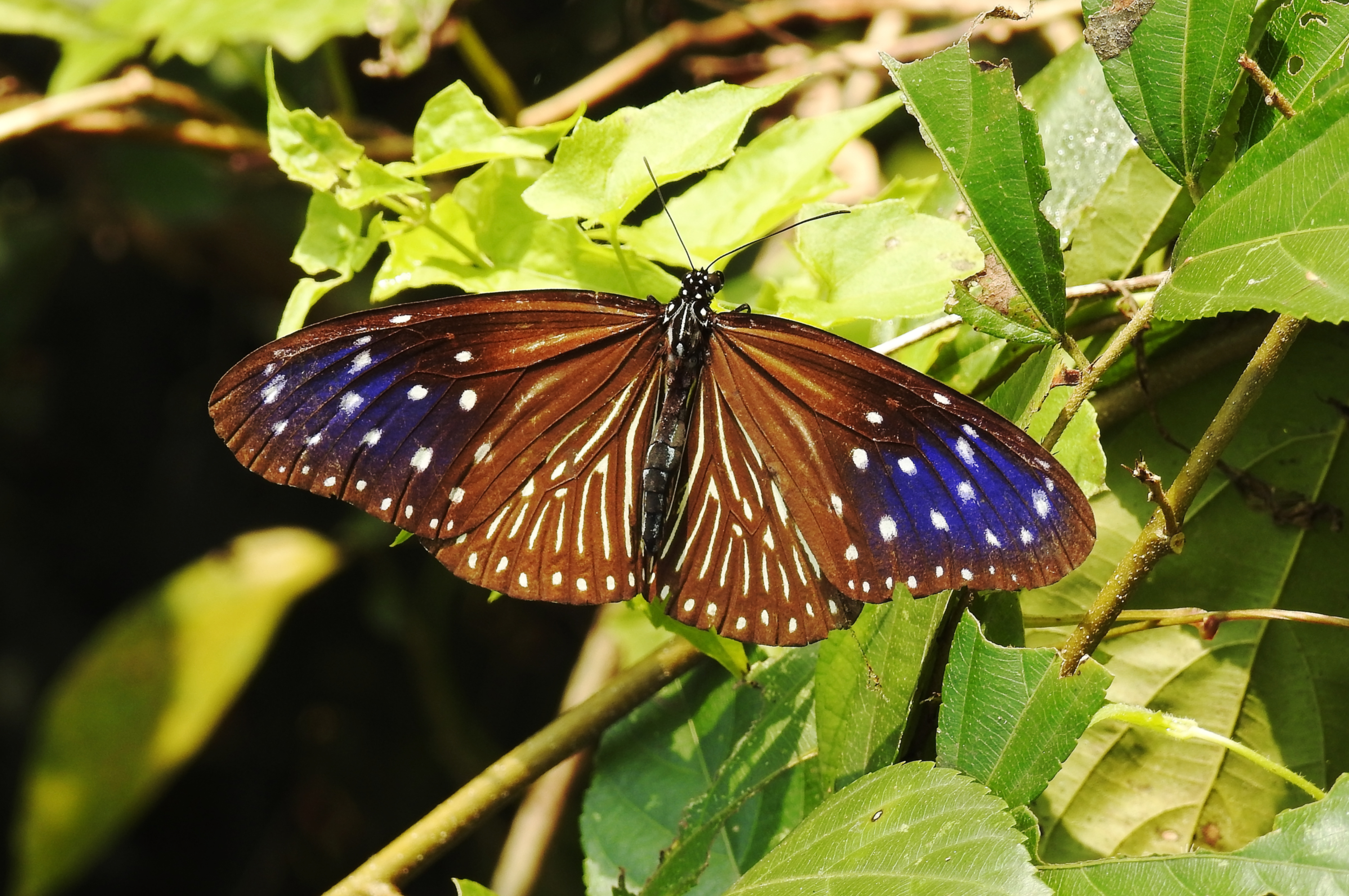
- female

Scientific classification
- Kingdom: Animalia
- Phylum: Arthropoda
- Class: Insecta
- Order: Lepidoptera
- Family: Nymphalidae
- Genus: Euploea
- Species: E. mulciber

Binomial name
- Euploea mulciber (Cramer, 1777)

Synonyms
- Trepsichrois linnaei

= Euploea mulciber =

Striped blue crow

Species of butterfly

Euploea mulciber, the striped blue crow, is a butterfly found in India and Southeast Asia that belongs to the crows and tigers, that is, the danaid group of the brush-footed butterflies family.

== Description ==
Hindwing ovate. Upperside: in the male dark brown entirely glossed with brilliant blue; the following violescent white spots—a spot in apex of cell, a much curved series of five or six discal spots, a subterminal sinuous row of larger spots and an incomplete terminal series of dots. Hindwing uniform, unmarked except for a large patch of light-brown, densely set hair-like scales on the outer upper third of the wing. The female is a lighter brown, the forewing only glossed with blue on the disc; spots white, and more or less similar to those on the forewing of the male, but larger and pure white; in addition a streak in cell and another curved streak in interspace 1 showing through faintly from the underside. Hindwing: narrow white streaks in cell and in the interspaces beyond and a terminal row of slightly elongate white spots.

Underside similar to the upperside in each, but the markings broader, larger and more distinct; in the male there are besides a small white spot in apex of cell, two or three discal and incomplete sub-terminal and terminal series of white dots. Antennae, head, thorax, and abdomen dark velvety brown, the abdomen glossed with greenish blue above; beneath, the head and thorax spotted, the abdomen transversely banded with white.

Larva. "Cylindrical, with four pairs of long fleshy subdorsal filaments which have pink bases and black tips, three pairs being on the anterior segments and the fourth pair on the 12th segment. Body pinkish white with lateral yellowish blotches, the segments each divided by a black line and anteriorly bordered by a narrow transverse pink band and purple-brown stripes; spiracles black; head with a dark red stripe in front and one on each side; fore legs black, middle and hind legs black ringed with pink" (Moore, Larva of the Javan form, E. claudia)

Pupa. "Short, thick across the middle; thorax concave behind; abdominal segments dorsally convex, metallic golden-brown with darker brown anterior stripe." (Moore.) Larvae feed on Nerium indicum, N. oleander, Ichnocarpus spp., Toxocarpus wightianus, Aristolochia spp., Argyreia penangiana, Ficus spp., Ficus retusa, F. benjamina, and Ichnocarpus volubis.

== Gallery ==
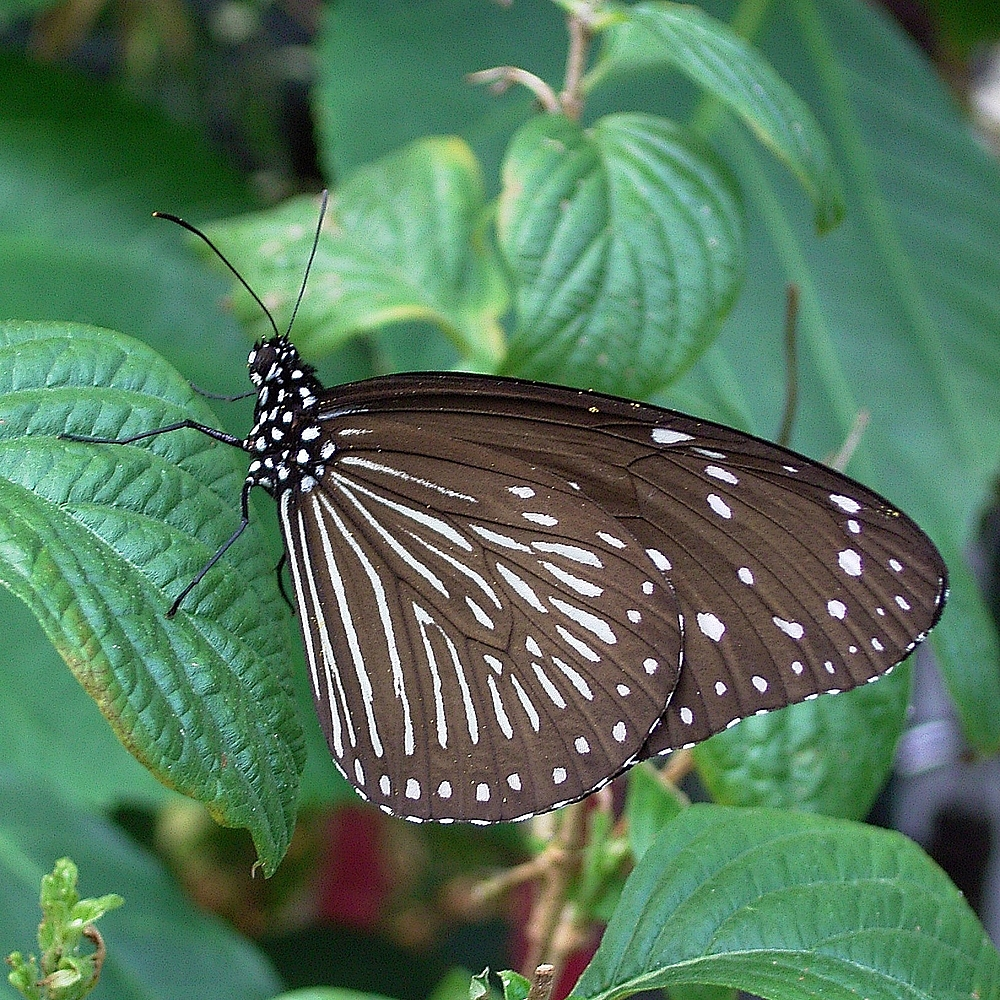
Female ventral view. From the Itami Insect Museum, Itami, Hyōgo, Japan

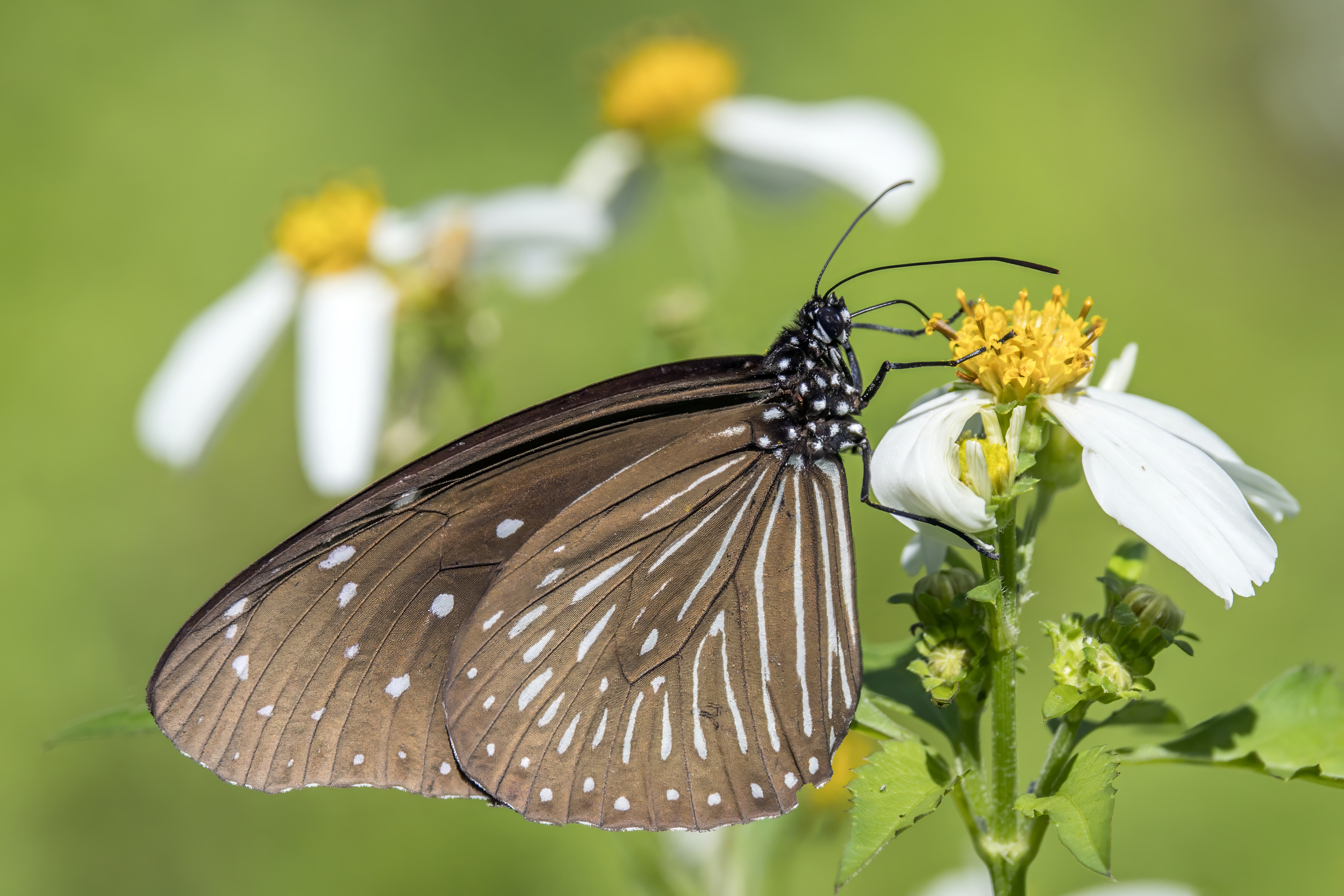
female E. m. barcine, Taiwan

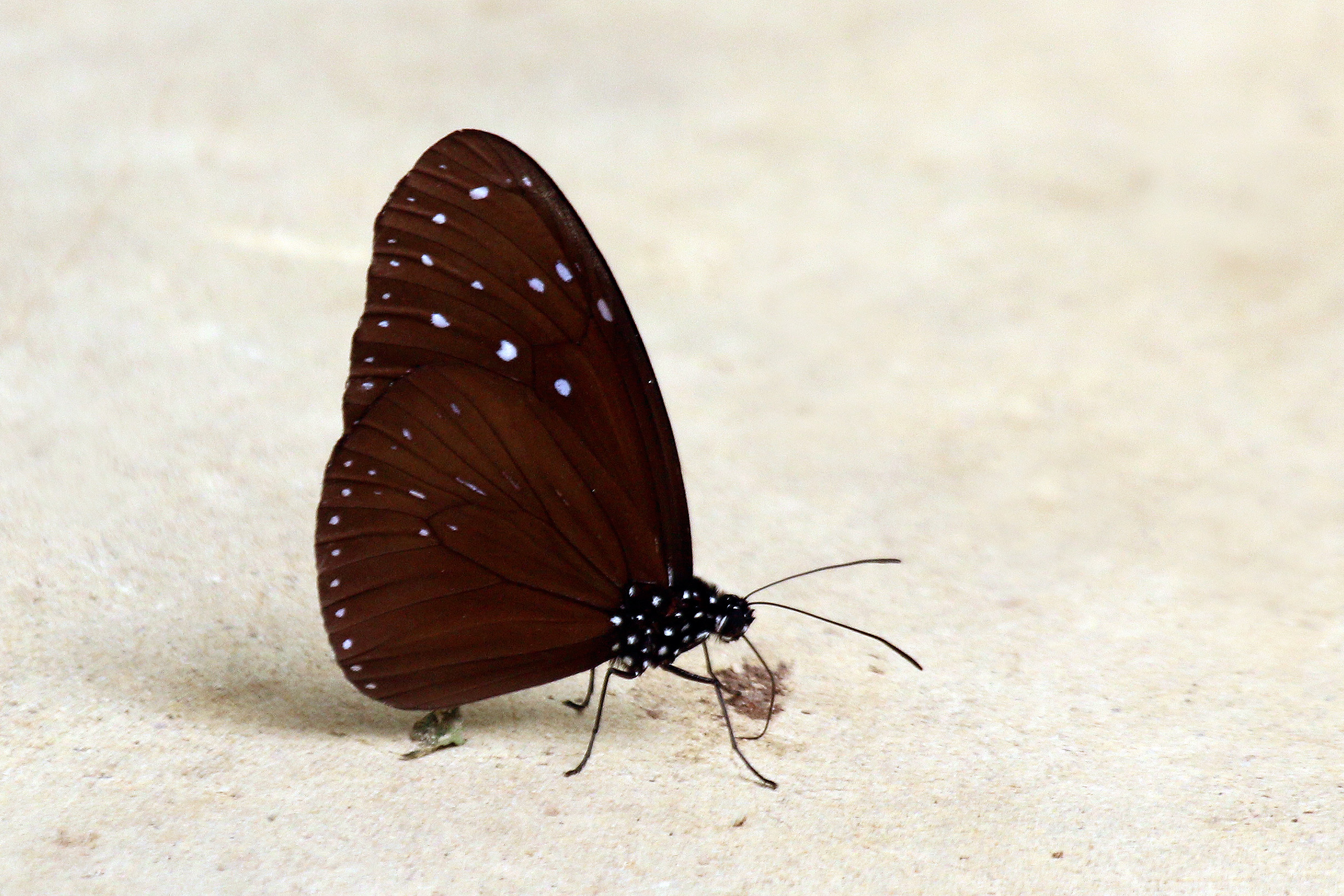
Male E. m. mulciber, Singapore

== See also ==
- Danainae
- Nymphalidae
- List of butterflies of India
- List of butterflies of India (Nymphalidae)
