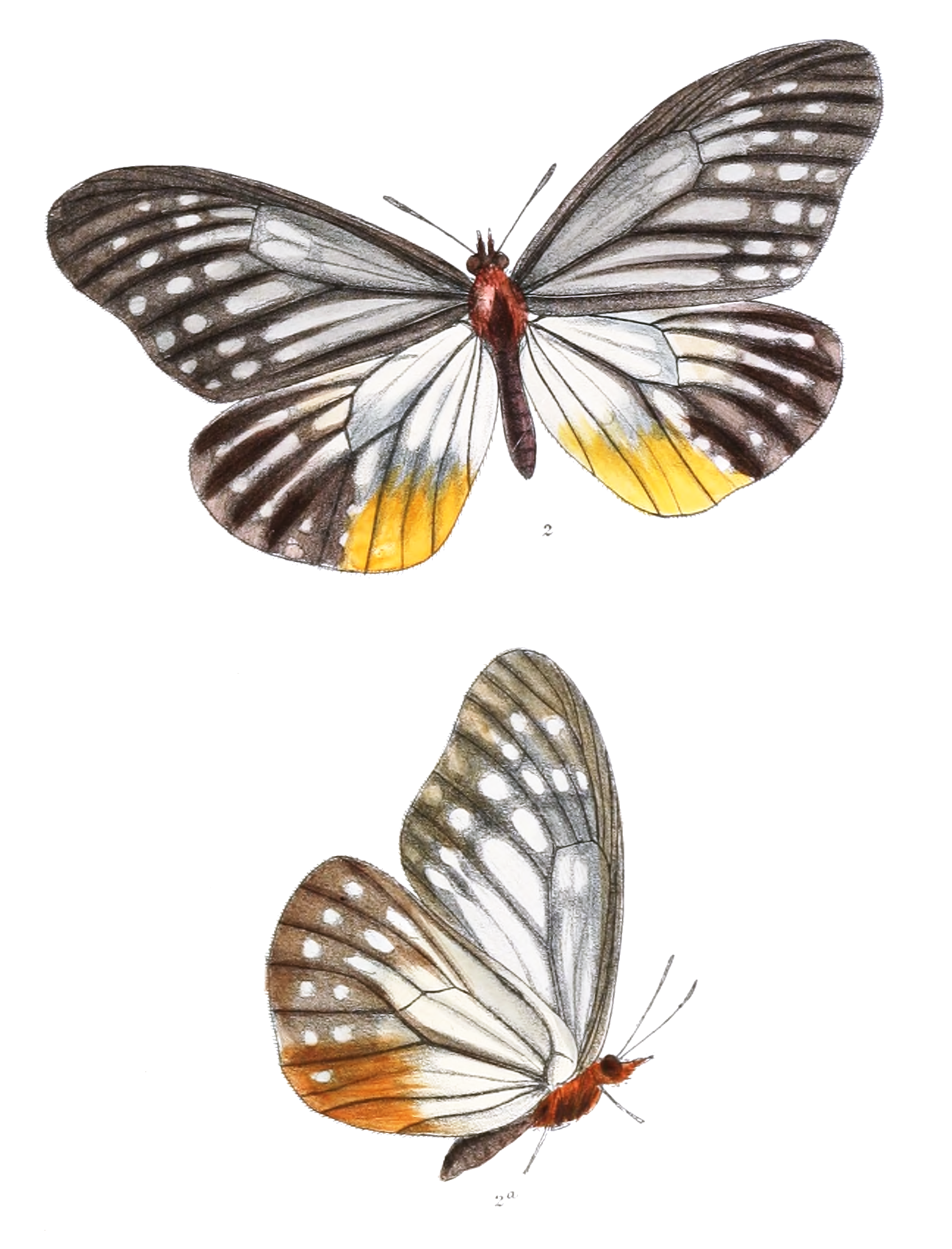

Scientific classification
- Domain: Eukaryota
- Kingdom: Animalia
- Phylum: Arthropoda
- Class: Insecta
- Order: Lepidoptera
- Family: Nymphalidae
- Genus: Calinaga
- Species: C. sudassana

Binomial name
- Calinaga sudassana Melvill, 1893

= Calinaga sudassana =

Species of butterfly

Calinaga sudassana is a species of butterfly in the family Nymphalidae. It is found in Burma and Thailand.

== Subspecies ==
- Calinaga sudassana sudassana
- Calinaga sudassana distans Monastyrskii et Devyatkin, 2000
