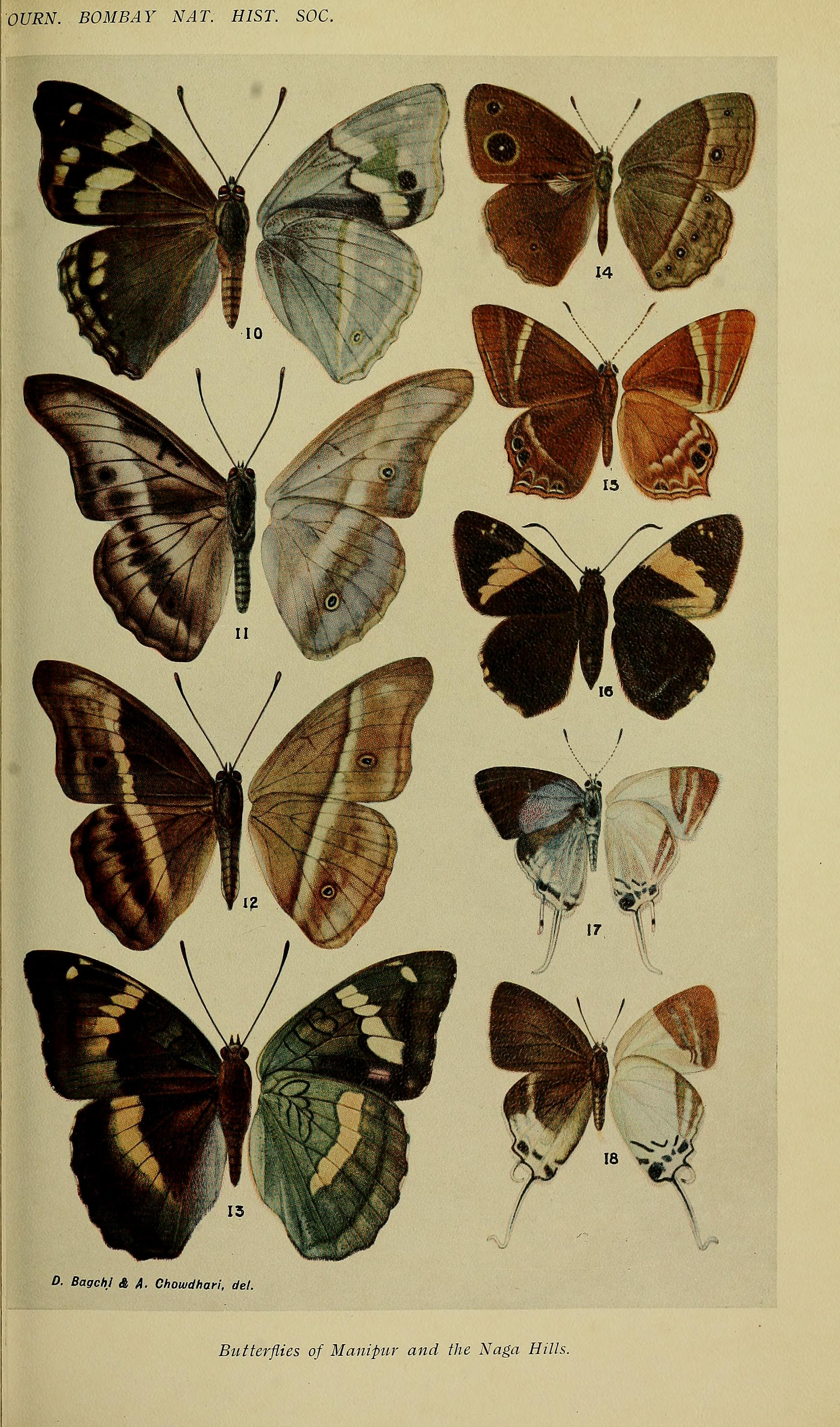
- Calinaga aborica figure 16 in Tytler Butterflies of the Naga Hills Journal of the Bombay Natural History Society

Scientific classification
- Domain: Eukaryota
- Kingdom: Animalia
- Phylum: Arthropoda
- Class: Insecta
- Order: Lepidoptera
- Family: Nymphalidae
- Genus: Calinaga
- Species: C. aborica

Binomial name
- Calinaga aborica Tytler, 1915

= Calinaga aborica =

Dark freak

Species of butterfly

Calinaga aborica, the dark freak or Abor freak, is a species of butterfly in the Calinaginae subfamily that is found in India and the Abor Hills of northern Burma.

== Description ==
Male. Upperside black with pale cream coloured markings. Forewing: two narrow pale streaks, irrorated with fuliginous scales, occupying the basal half of the cell and joined together towards the base; the lower streak the longer of the two; two short contiguous similarly coloured streaks, places one above the other, towards the end of the cell, between which and the bases of veins 3 and 5 are two ore very indistinct pale spots; a broad pale streak, bifurcated at its outer half, in interspaces 1, commencing at the base and extending well beyond the base of vein 2, the lower portion the longer; a long narrow pale streak at base of interspace 4; a discal row of narrow pale streaks in interspaces 2-6; a subterminal row of pale cream spots in interspaces 1-6, interspace 1 having two spots; and lastly a terminal row of very indistinct spots in interspace 1-4.

Hindwing: a broad pale streak in cell, commencing at the base and not quite reaching the end, the outer two-thirds bifurcated and dusted with fuliginous scales, the upper portion a little longer than the lower; two pale streaks dusted with fuliginous scales at base of interspaces 4 and 5; a discal row of pale spots in interspaces 1-3 and 5-7, the first very small and indistinct, those in interspaces 5 and 6 long and linear; a subterminal row of large pale spots in interspaces 1-6; basal half of interspaces 1-b and 1-a pale cream; dorsal half of the wing densely covered with long grey hairs. Underside: pale markings as above but much broader and distinct; the subterminal row of pale spots on hindwing continued into interspace 1-b.

Body above black, sides of body at junction of the forewings red; underneath black, red near base of hindwings. Antennae black; eyes brown. Wingspan of the male 3.5–3.62 inches (89–92 mm)

This species is found in the Arunachal Pradesh, India.
