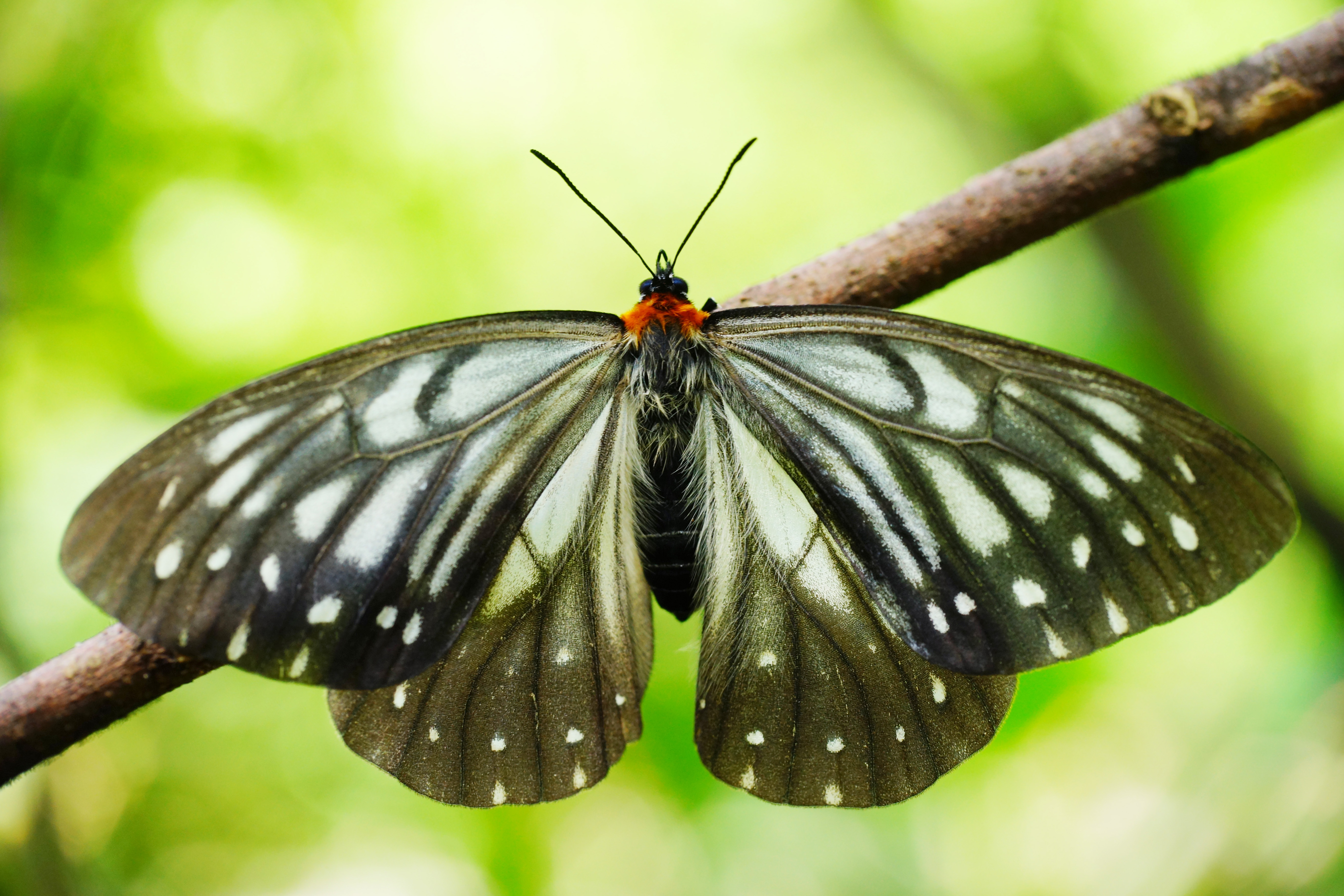
- C. b. formosana Fruhstorfer, 1908

Scientific classification
- Kingdom: Animalia
- Phylum: Arthropoda
- Clade: Pancrustacea
- Class: Insecta
- Order: Lepidoptera
- Family: Nymphalidae
- Genus: Calinaga
- Species: C. buddha

Binomial name
- Calinaga buddha Moore, 1857

Subspecies
- 6 subspecies: C. b. avalokita Fruhstorfer, 1914; C. b. bedoci Le Cerf, 1926; C. b. brahma Butler, 1885; C. b. formosana Fruhstorfer, 1908; C. b. lactoris Fruhstorfer, 1908; C. b. nebulosa Oberthür, 1920

Synonyms
- 3 synonyms: C. b. concolor Mell, 1952; C. b. fokienensis Fruhstorfer, 1914; C. b. kuangtungenis Mell, 1952

= Calinaga buddha =

Freak

Species of butterfly

Calinaga buddha, the freak, is a species of butterfly in the Nymphalidae family, Calinaginae subfamily. It is found from Muree, Punjab, Pakistan to Assam, India and from Sikkim, India to north Myanmar. The subspecies C. b. brahma Butler, 1885 is found in Yunnan, China and Assam India, and the subspecies C. b. formosana Fruhstorfer, 1908 is found in Taiwan.

== Description ==
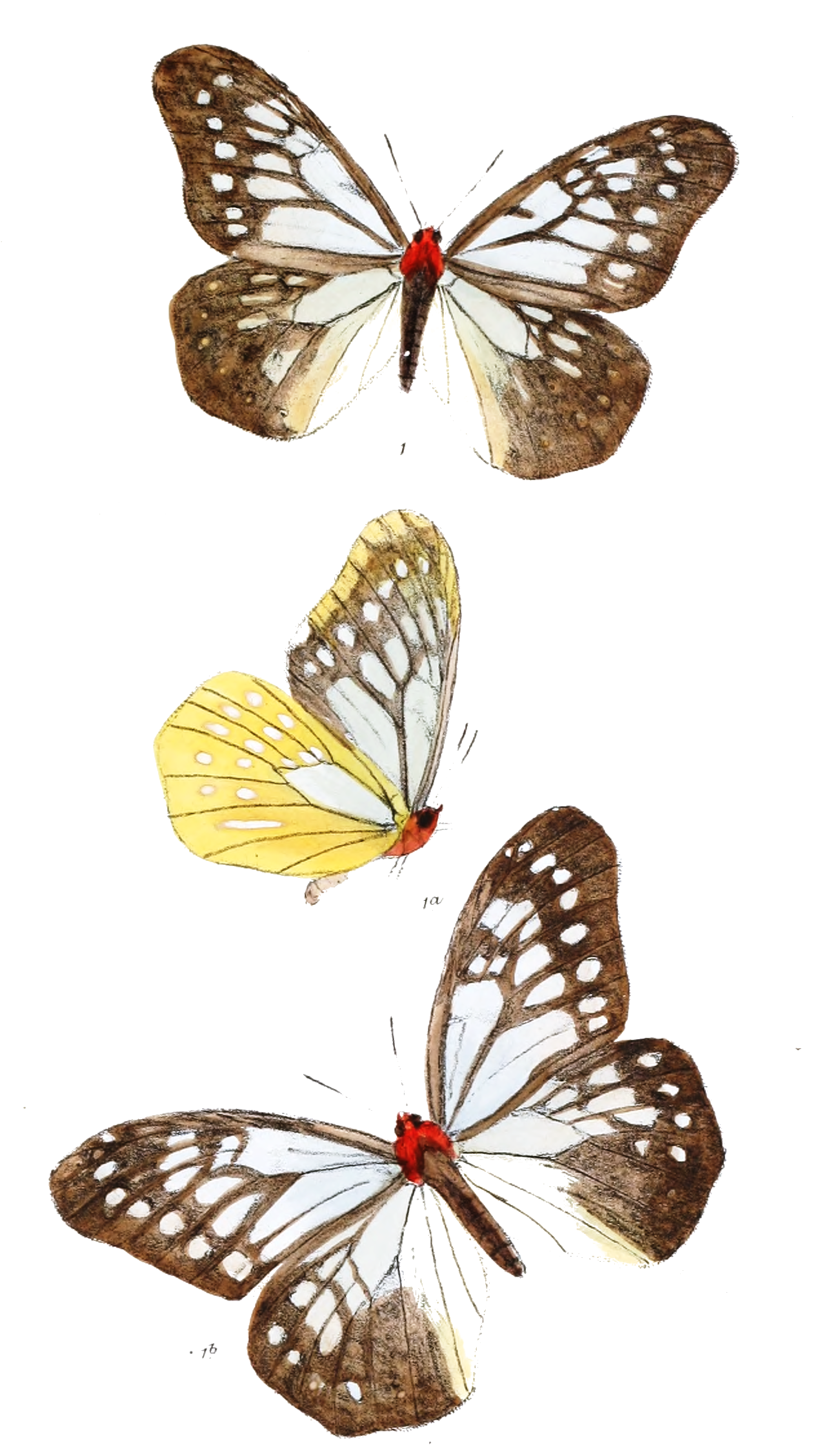

The upperside ground colour is fuliginous (sooty) black with the veins prominently black. Forewings and hindwings with the following white markings, sometimes slightly tinged with cream colour. Forewing: basal half of cell; a transverse spot at its apex; basal two-thirds of interspace 1 a small diffuse spot at bases of interspaces 4 and 5; a discal transverse series of elongate spots from interspace 2 to costa, becoming slender streaks in interspaces 9 and 10; and a postdiscal series of more rounded spots, minute in interspaces 7 and 8. The elongate white mark in interspace 1 traversed by a slender black streak. Hindwing with the following similar while markings: The dorsal margin broadly up to vein 1; the basal half of interspace 1; nearly the whole of the discoidal cell; spots at base of interspaces 4, 5, 6, and 7; an upper discal transverse series of four elongate spots, and a postdiscal similar series of more rounded smaller spots. Underside: forewing pale fuliginous black; white markings as on the upperside, but larger, more diffuse. Hindwing: ground colour ochraceous; white markings as on the upperside, but interspaces 1 a and 1 strongly tinged with ochraceous; discal and postdiscal series of six, not four, spots each; veins chestnut-brown. Antenna, head, thorax posteriorly and abdomen black; pronotum and mesonotum anteriorly and on the sides with crimson pubescence; beneath, antennae, head, thorax and abdomen black.

== Larvae ==
Morus australis Poir. is a host plant for C. buddha. The female lays isolated eggs on the underside of leaves of the host plant. The first instar larvae feed from the tip of the leaves without eating the midrib. The tiny larva uses the tip of the uneaten midrib for resting. The larvae from second to fourth instar make a refuge by cutting and folding one side of the leaf, while the last instar larvae elaborate a tubular refuge by spinning silk.
