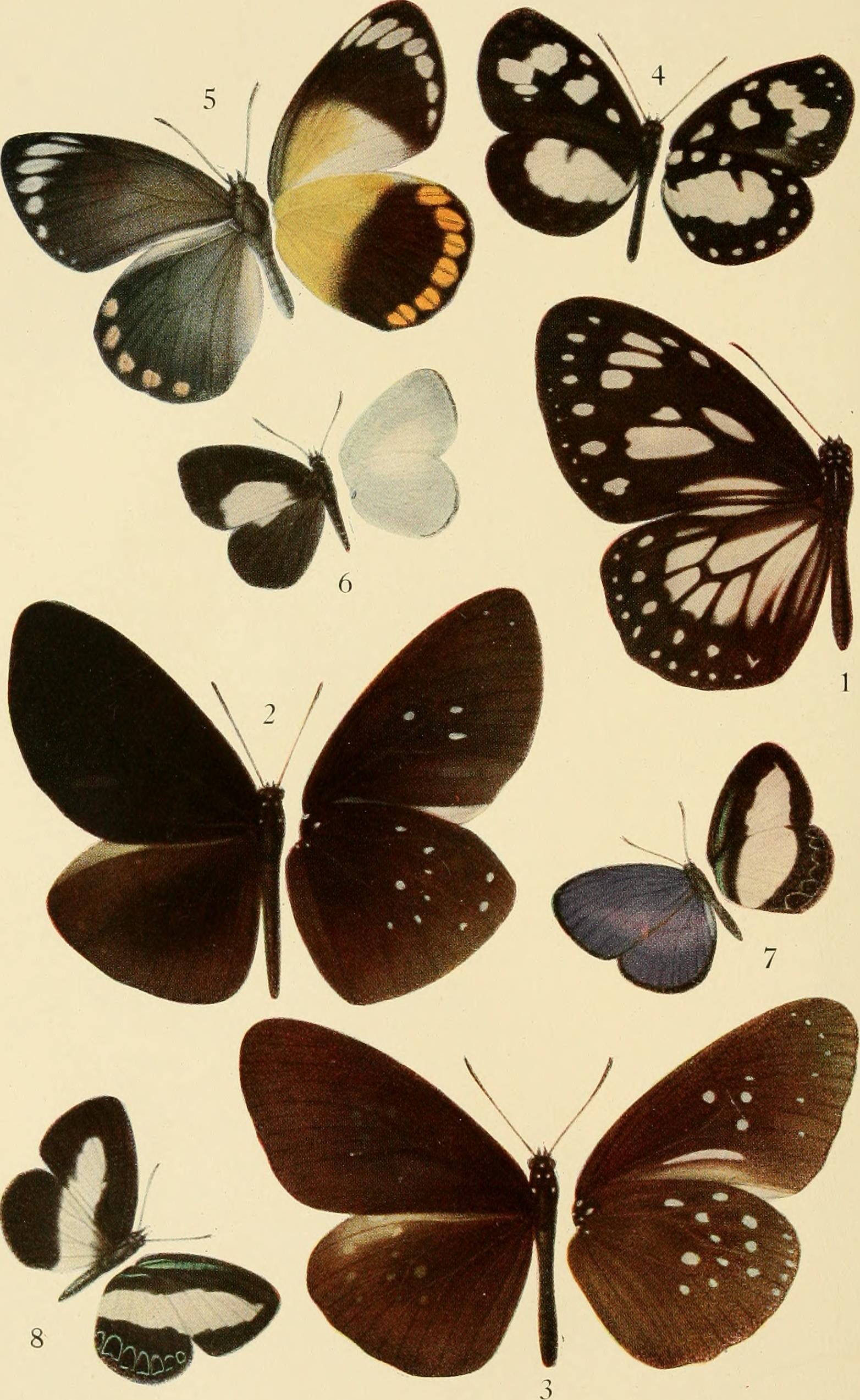
- Tellervo nedusia biakensis Joicey & Talbot, 1916 (figure 4)
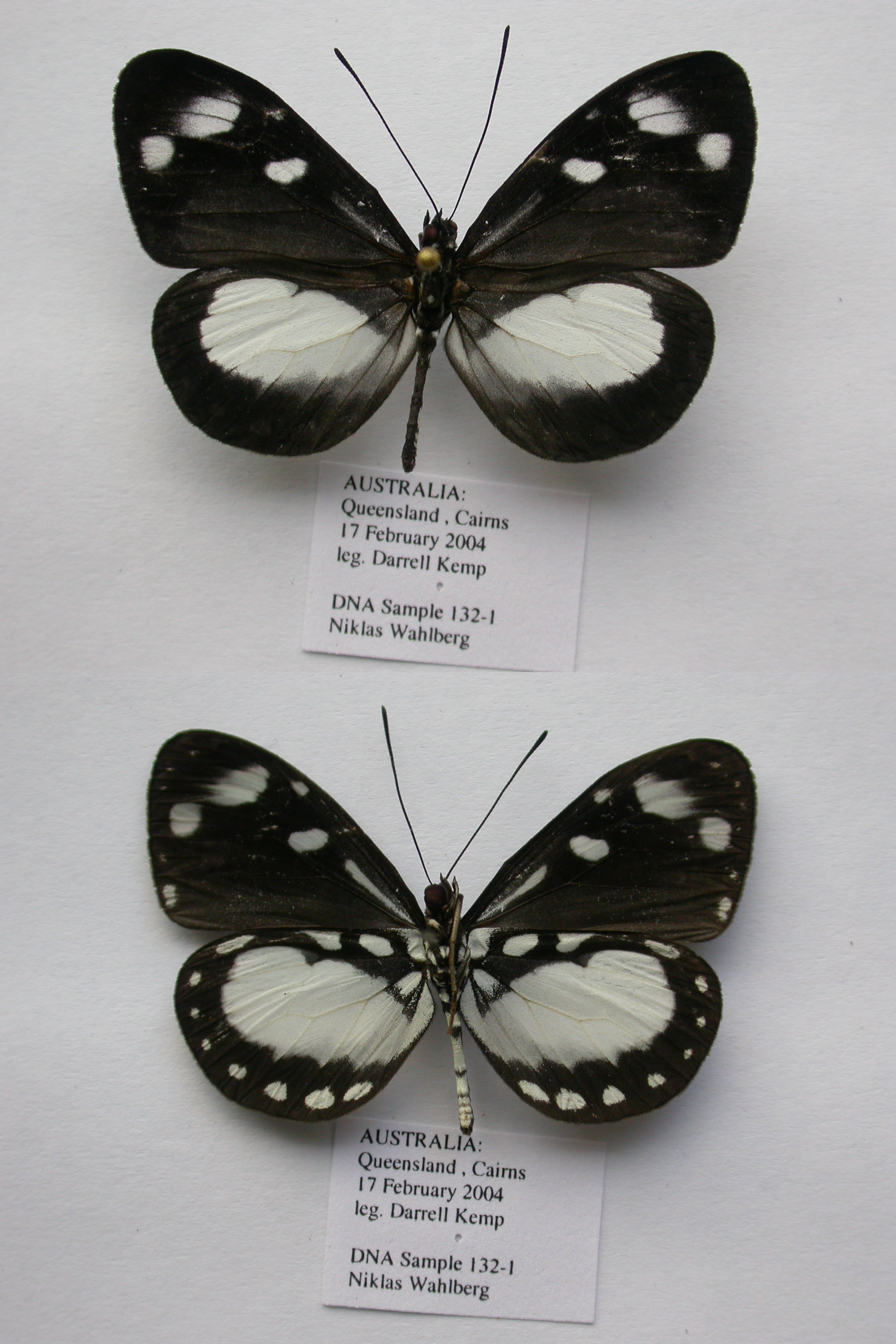
- Tellervo zoilus

Scientific classification
- Kingdom: Animalia
- Phylum: Arthropoda
- Clade: Pancrustacea
- Class: Insecta
- Order: Lepidoptera
- Family: Nymphalidae
- Subfamily: Danainae
- Tribe: Tellervini; Fruhstorfer, 1910

Synonyms
- Genus-level: Hamadryas Boisduval, 1832 (non Hübner, 1804: preoccupied)

= Tellervini =

Monogeneric tribe in butterfly subfamily Danainae

Tellervini is a tribe of danaid butterflies with only the one genus Tellervo, with six widely distributed species found in the Australasian realm and the Indomalayan realm (also called the Oriental region). The taxon is apparently monophyletic, but its relationship with the other two danaid tribes is yet uncertain. The phylogeography of the group is also a challenge to those who hold to a Cenozoic origin of the butterflies.

== Genus, species, and subspecies of Tellervini ==
- Source: The higher classification of Nymphalidae, at Nymphalidae.net
- Note: Names preceded by an equal sign (=) are synonyms, homonyms, rejected names or invalid names.

Subfamily Danainae Boisduval, 1833

Tribe Tellervini Fruhstorfer, 1910

- Tellervo Kirby, 1894 (= Hamadryas Boisduval, 1832 (nec Hübner, 1806))
  - Tellervo jurriaansei Joicey & Talbot, 1922
  - Tellervo nedusia (Geyer, 1832) (= original name Stalachtis nedusia Geyer, 1832; = Hamadryas nedusia (Geyer, 1832))
    - Tellervo nedusia nedusia (Geyer, 1832) (= Tellervo zoilus f. incisa Strand, 1911)
    - Tellervo nedusia fallax (Staudinger, 1885) (= original name Hamadryas assarica f. fallax Staudinger, 1885)
    - Tellervo nedusia coalescens Rothschild, 1915 (= Tellervo fallax exilis Hulstaert, 1931)
    - Tellervo nedusia biakensis Joicey & Talbot, 1916
    - Tellervo nedusia meforicus Fruhstorfer, 1911 (= Tellervo zoilus roonensis Fruhstorfer, 1911)
    - Tellervo nedusia mysoriensis (Staudinger, 1885) (= original name Hamadryas zoilus f. mysoriensis Staudinger, 1885)
    - Tellervo nedusia jobia Ackery, 1987
    - Tellervo nedusia wollastoni Rothschild, 1916 (= Tellervo assarica adriaansei Hulstaert, 1923)
    - Tellervo nedusia papuensis Ackery, 1987
    - Tellervo nedusia huona Ackery, 1987
    - Tellervo nedusia wangaarica Ackery, 1987
    - Tellervo nedusia talasea Ackery, 1987
    - Tellervo nedusia aruensis Joicey & Talbot, 1922
  - Tellervo hiero (Godman & Salvin, 1888) (= original name Hamadryas hiero Godman & Salvin, 1888)
    - Tellervo hiero hiero (Godman & Salvin, 1888) (= Hamadryas salomonis Ribbe, 1898)
    - Tellervo hiero evages (Godman & Salvin, 1888)
  - Tellervo parvipuncta Joicey & Talbot, 1922
    - Tellervo parvipuncta parvipuncta Joicey & Talbot, 1922
    - Tellervo parvipuncta separata Ackery, 1987
  - Tellervo zoilus (Fabricius, 1775) (= original name Papilio zoilus Fabricius, 1775)
    - Tellervo zoilus zoilus (Fabricius, 1775)
    - Tellervo zoilus niveipicta (Butler, 1884) (= Tellervo zoilus vereja Fruhstorfer, 1911)
    - Tellervo zoilus nais (Guérin-Méneville, 1830) (= original name Nymphalis nais Guérin-Méneville, 1830)
    - Tellervo zoilus distincta Rothschild, 1915
    - Tellervo zoilus digulica Hulstaert, 1924 (= Tellervo zoilus arctifascia Hulstaert, 1924)
    - Tellervo zoilus zephoris Fruhstorfer, 1911
    - Tellervo zoilus antipatrus Fruhstorfer, 1911 (= Tellervo zoilus pantaenus Fruhstorfer, 1916)
    - Tellervo zoilus sarcapus Fruhstorfer, 1911
    - Tellervo zoilus mujua Ackery, 1987
    - Tellervo zoilus misima Ackery, 1987
    - Tellervo zoilus tagula Ackery, 1987
    - Tellervo zoilus duba Ackery, 1987
    - Tellervo zoilus gelo Waterhouse & Lyell, 1914
    - Tellervo zoilus aequicinctus (Salvin & Godman, 1877) (= original name Hamadryas aequicinctus Salvin & Godman, 1877; = Hamadryas aequicinctus var. variegatus Ribbe, 1898)
    - Tellervo zoilus lavonga Ackery, 1987
  - Tellervo assarica (Stoll, 1781) (= original name Papilio assarica Stoll, 1781; = Aeria assarica (Stoll, 1781); = Heliconia assarica (Stoll, 1781); = Hamadryas assarica (Stoll, 1781))
    - Tellervo assarica assarica (Stoll, 1781)
    - Tellervo assarica boeroeensis Jurriaanse & Volbeda, 1922
    - Tellervo assarica seramica Ackery, 1987
    - Tellervo assarica mysolensis Joicey & Talbot, 1922
    - Tellervo assarica gebiensis Ackery, 1987
    - Tellervo assarica macrofallax Strand, 1911 (= Tellervo assarica waigeuensis Joicey & Talbot, 1922)
    - Tellervo assarica salawatica Ackery, 1987
    - Tellervo assarica mioswara Ackery, 1987
    - Tellervo assarica jobinus Fruhstorfer, 1911 (= Tellervo zoilus mysoriensis f. kordonis Strand, 1911)
    - Tellervo assarica limetanus Fruhstorfer, 1911 (= Tellervo zoilus sedunia Strand, 1911)
    - Tellervo assarica strandi Ackery, 1987
    - Tellervo assarica talboti Ackery, 1987
    - Tellervo assarica hiempsal Fruhstorfer, 1910
