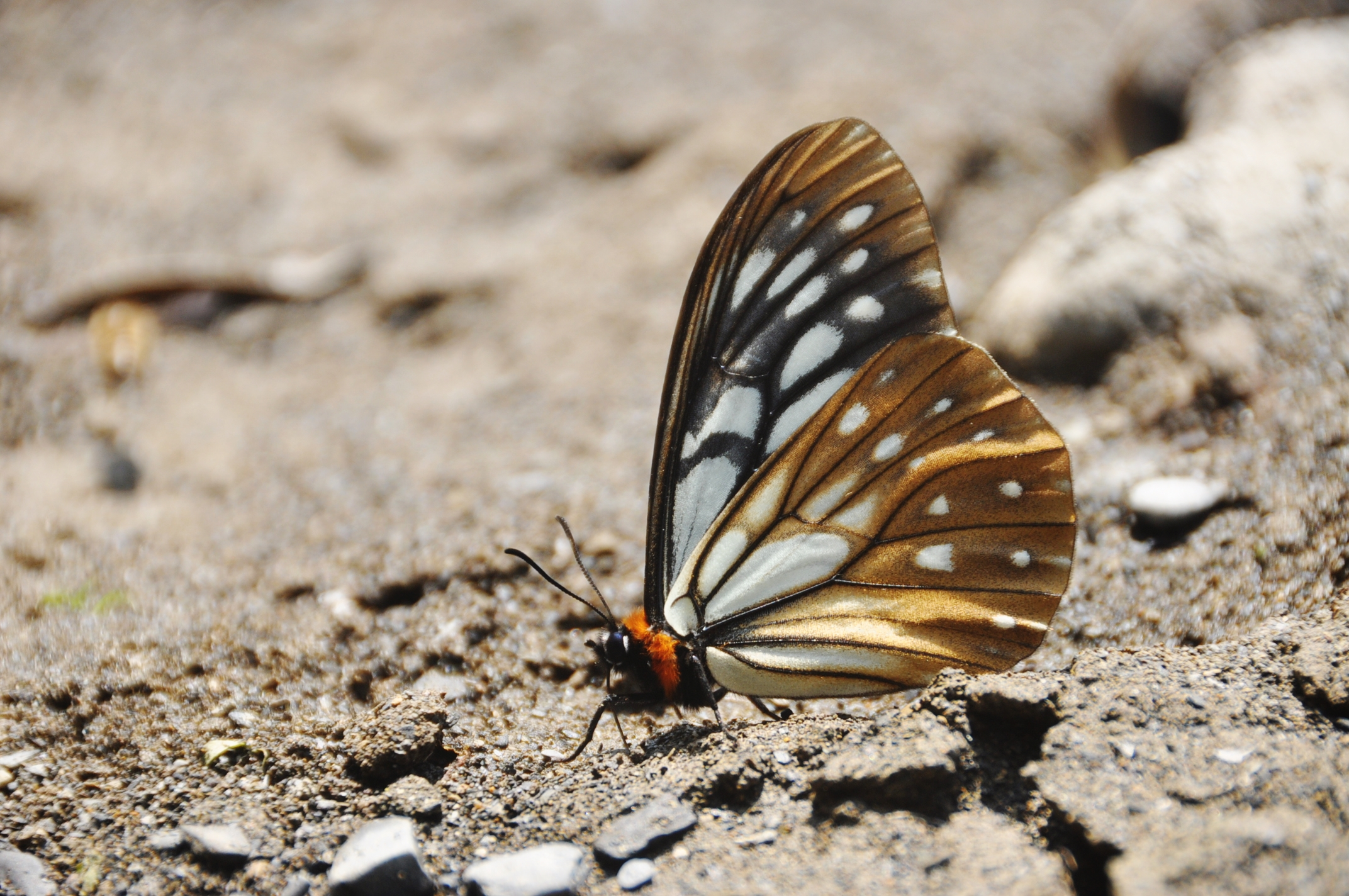
- Calinaga buddha

Scientific classification
- Kingdom: Animalia
- Phylum: Arthropoda
- Class: Insecta
- Order: Lepidoptera
- Family: Nymphalidae
- Subfamily: Calinaginae; Moore, 1895
- Genus: Calinaga; Moore, 1857

Species
- See text

= Calinaga =

Sole genus of butterfly subfamily Calinaginae

Calinaga is the sole genus of the monotypic nymphalid butterfly subfamily Calinaginae. Its species occur in South Asia and Southeast Asia. The evolutionary history of Calinaga remains a mystery until today. Recent research indicated that the common ancestor of Calinaga first split in the Eocene in southern China. This was most likely due to a consequence of geological and environmental impacts of the collision of the Indian and Asian subcontinents.

== Classification ==
- Calinaga aborica Tytler, 1915 – Abor freak
- Calinaga buddha Moore, 1857 – freak
- Calinaga buphonas Oberthür, 1920
- Calinaga cercyon de Nicéville
- Calinaga davidis Oberthür
- Calinaga funebris Oberthür, 1919
- Calinaga funeralis Monastyrskii & Devyatkin, 2000
- Calinaga genestieri Oberthür, 1922
- Calinaga gautama Moore, 1896 – Sikkim freak
- Calinaga lhatso Oberthür, 1893
- Calinaga sudassana Melville, 1893
