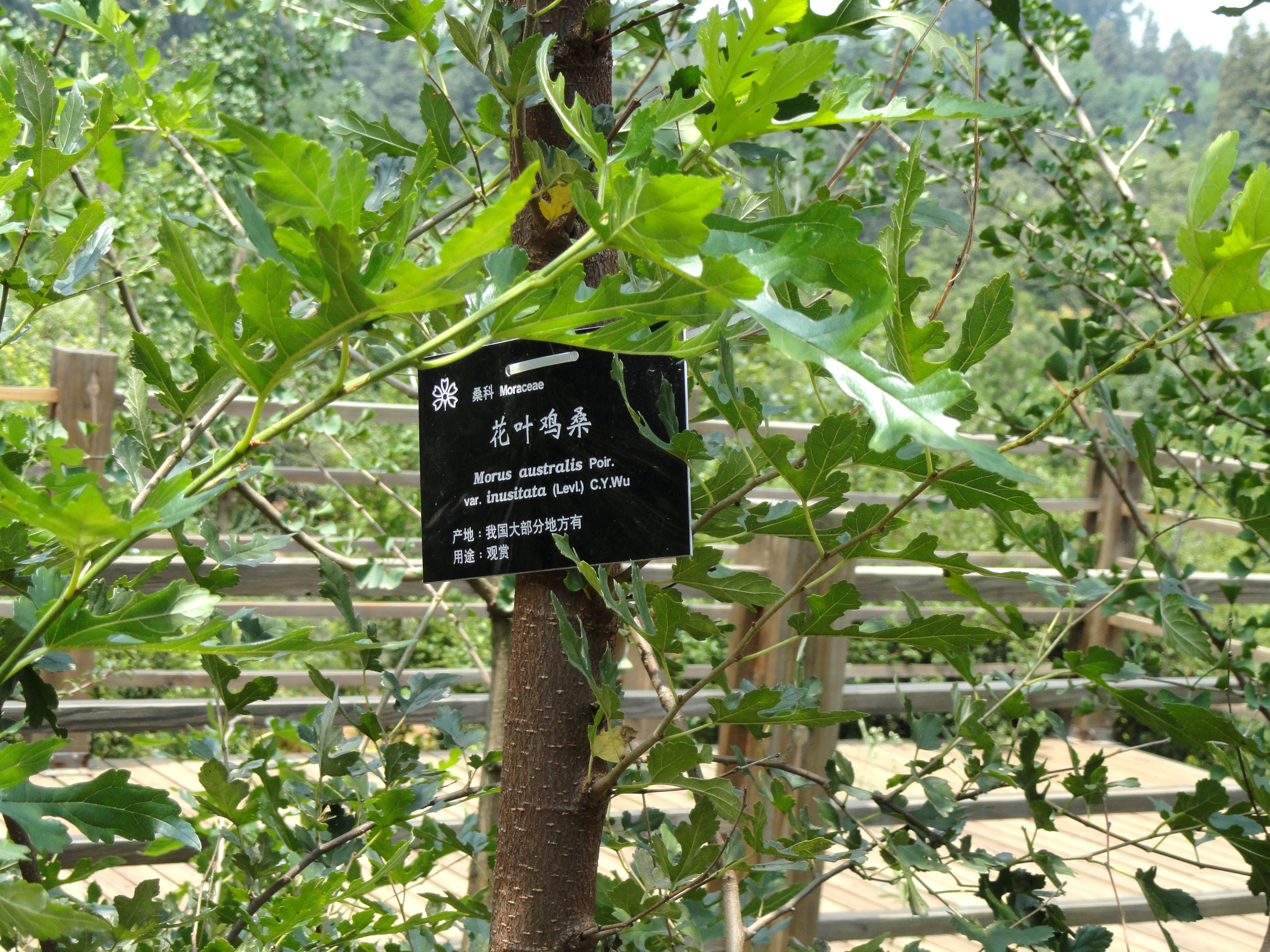
- Plant specimen in the Kunming Botanical Garden, Kunming, Yunnan, China

Scientific classification
- Kingdom: Plantae
- Clade: Tracheophytes
- Clade: Angiosperms
- Clade: Eudicots
- Clade: Rosids
- Order: Rosales
- Family: Moraceae
- Genus: Morus
- Species: M. australis

Binomial name
- Morus australis Poir.

Synonyms
- 21 synonyms: M. acidosa Griff.; M. alba var. indica (L.) Bureau; M. alba var. nigriformis Bureau; M. alba var. stylosa Bureau; M. australis var. hastifolia (F.T.Wang & T.Tang ex Z.Y.Cao) Z.Y.Cao; M. australis var. incisa C.Y.Wu; M. australis var. inusitata (H.Lév.) C.Y.Wu; M. australis var. linearipartita Z.Y.Cao; M. australis var. oblongifolia Z.Y.Cao; M. bombycis Koidz.; M. bombycis var. angustifolia Koidz.; M. bombycis var. bifida Koidz.; M. bombycis var. longistyla Koidz.; M. bombycis var. tiliifolia Koidz.; M. cavaleriei H.Lév.; M. formosensis Hotta; M. hastifolia F.T.Wang & T.Tang ex Z.Y.Cao; M. inusitata H.Lév.; M. longistyla Diels; M. nigriformis (Bureau) Koidz.; M. stylosa var. ovalifolia Ser.

= Morus australis =

Species of tree

Morus australis, also called Korean mulberry and Chinese mulberry, is a flowering plant species found in East and Southeast Asia.

M. australis is a host plant for Calinaga buddha (Freak).

The substance "Australone A", a prenylflavonoid, can be found in M. australis.

== Classification ==
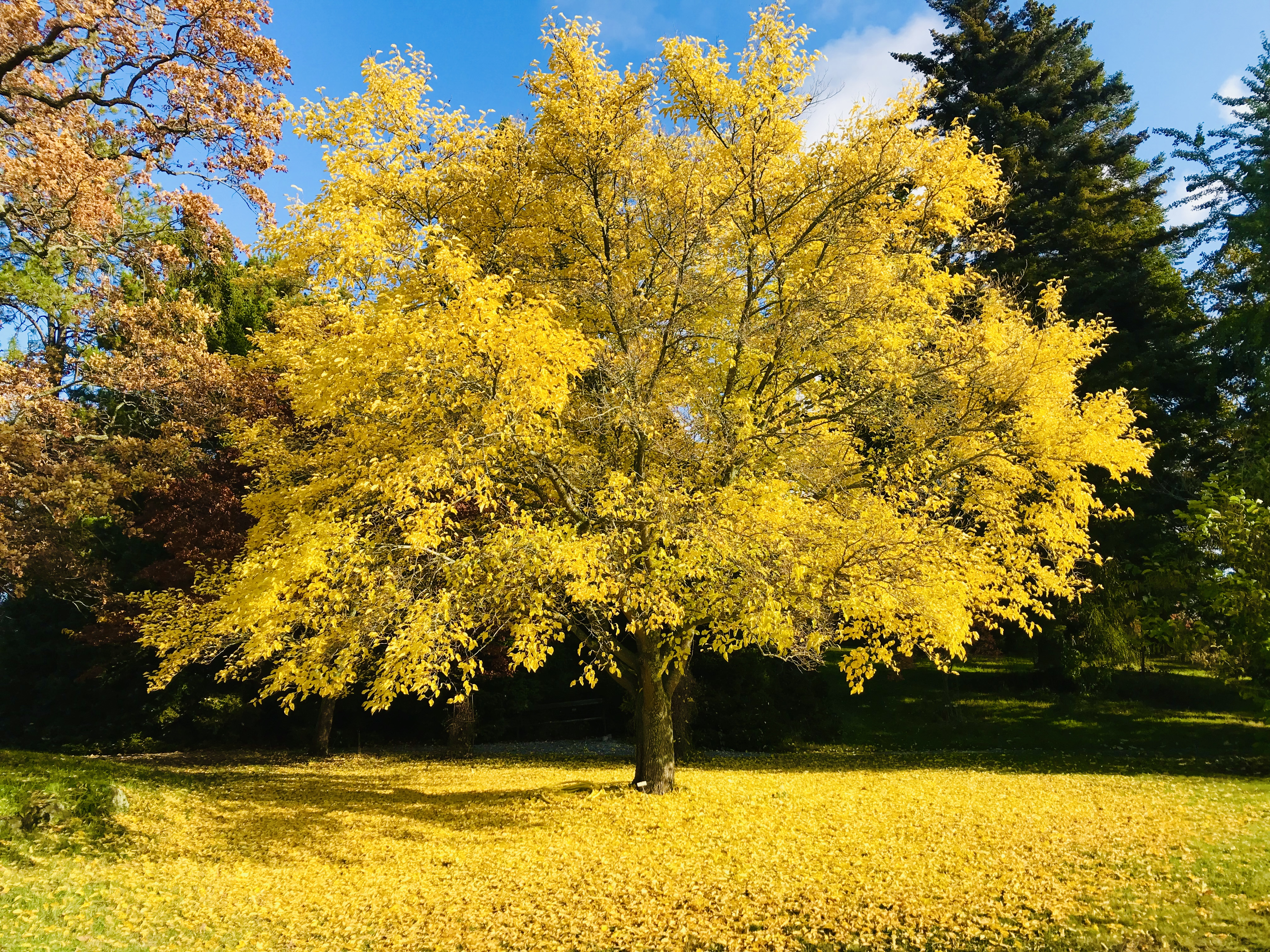

Some authorities claim that M. australis is a synonym of Broussonetia papyrifera, the paper mulberry., others deny this, claiming that M. australis and B. papyrifera are separate species within the Moraceae family.

M. australis is closely related to M. kagayamae, the main difference is that M. australis has fewer, or no, palmate leaves. The majority of Morus species should be considered subspecies of M. alba, whether M. australis is a separate species, or a subspecies of M. alba has not been established. Millennia of cultivation of Morus species, and easy hybridisation between Morus species, has resulted in problems for classification.
