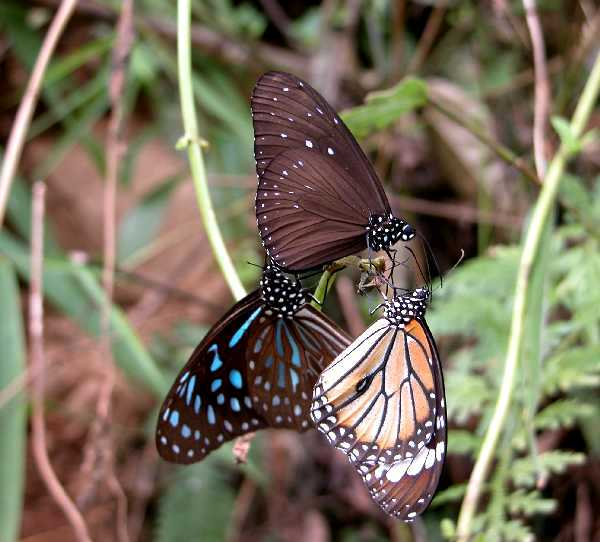
- Three milkweed butterflies. Clockwise from left: dark blue tiger (Tirumala septentrionis), striped blue crow (Euploea mulciber), and common tiger (Danaus genutia)

Scientific classification
- Kingdom: Animalia
- Phylum: Arthropoda
- Clade: Pancrustacea
- Class: Insecta
- Order: Lepidoptera
- Family: Nymphalidae
- Subfamily: Danainae

Tribes
- Danaini; Tellervini; Ithomiini; but see text

Synonyms
- Danaidae

= Danainae =

Subfamily of butterfly family Nymphalidae

Danainae is a subfamily of the family Nymphalidae, the brush-footed butterflies. The group may be referred to as the Danaids (reflecting their previous rank as a family) or milkweed butterflies, as they often lay their eggs on various milkweeds on which their larvae (caterpillars) feed, though it also encompasses the clearwing butterflies (Ithomiini), and the Tellervini.

Some 300 species of Danainae exist worldwide. Most of the Danaini are found in tropical Asia and Africa, while the Ithomiini are diverse in the Neotropics. Tellervini are restricted to Australia and the Oriental region. Four species are found in North America: the monarch butterfly (Danaus plexippus), the queen (Danaus gilippus), the tropical milkweed butterfly (Lycorea halia), and the soldier butterfly (or "tropic queen", Danaus eresimus). Of these, the monarch is by far the most famous, being one of the most recognizable butterflies in the Americas.

== Taxonomy ==
Milkweed butterflies are now classified as the subfamily Danainae within the family Nymphalidae; however, the previous family name Danaidae is still occasionally used by some sources. The fossil milkweed butterfly Archaeolycorea is known from the Oligocene or Miocene of Brazil from the Tremembé Formation; it provides evidence that the present milkweed butterflies originated more than 20–30 million years ago.

== Characteristics ==
Larvae have thoracic tubercles and use plants within the family Apocynaceae that often contain latex-like compounds in the stem as hosts. Adults are aposematic (brightly colored as a warning signal).

== Threats ==
Numerous wasps and tachinid flies are parasitoids of milkweed butterfly caterpillars.

The loss of food plants, such as various milkweed species, extensive use of insecticides and modification of landscapes in the United States and Canada, and increased deforestation in Mexico threaten the migratory monarch butterfly.

Representatives of Danaid tribes

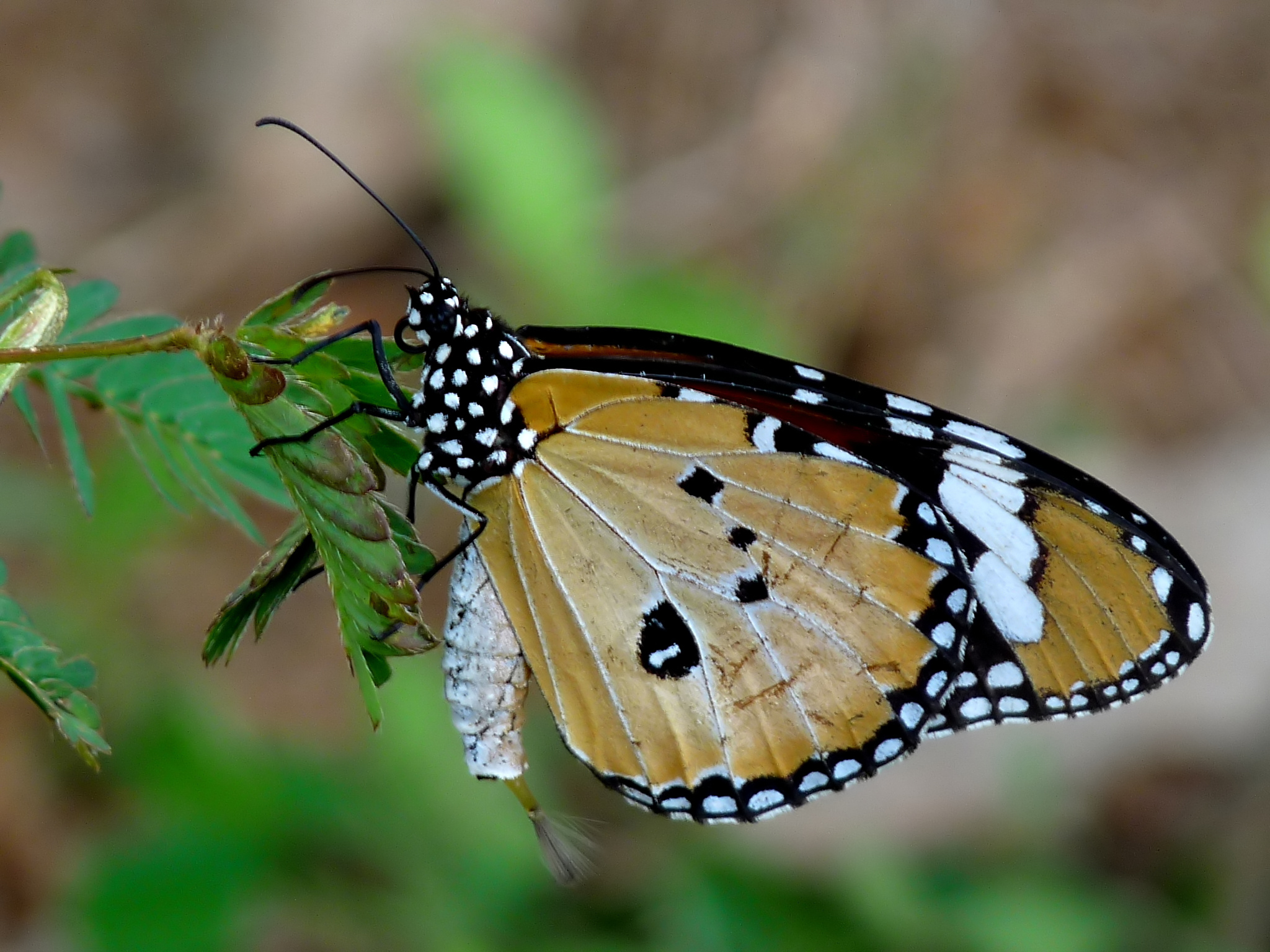
Danaus chrysippus, male with anal "hairs"; Danaini

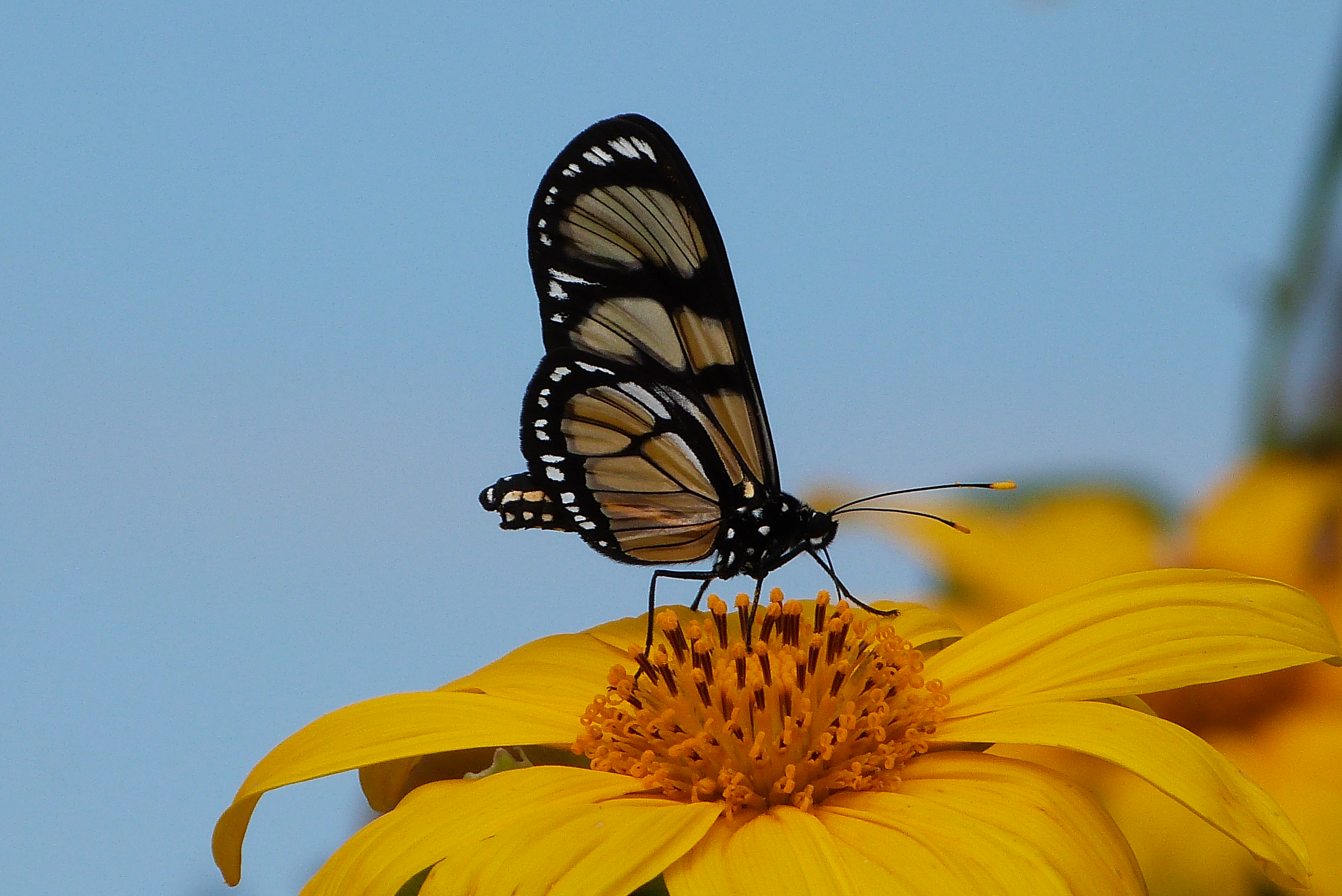
Methona themisto; Ithomiini

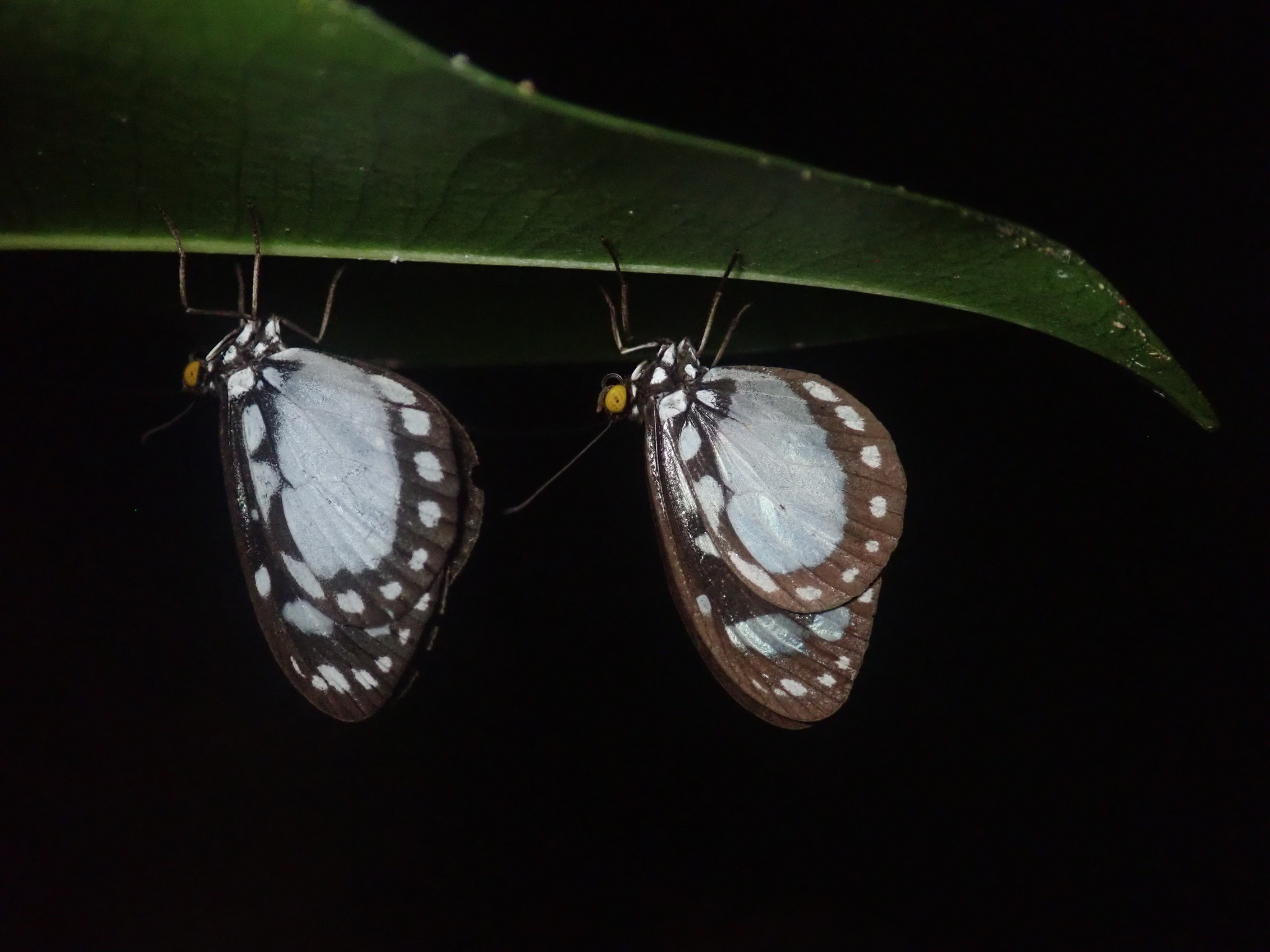
Tellervo zoilus; Tellervini
