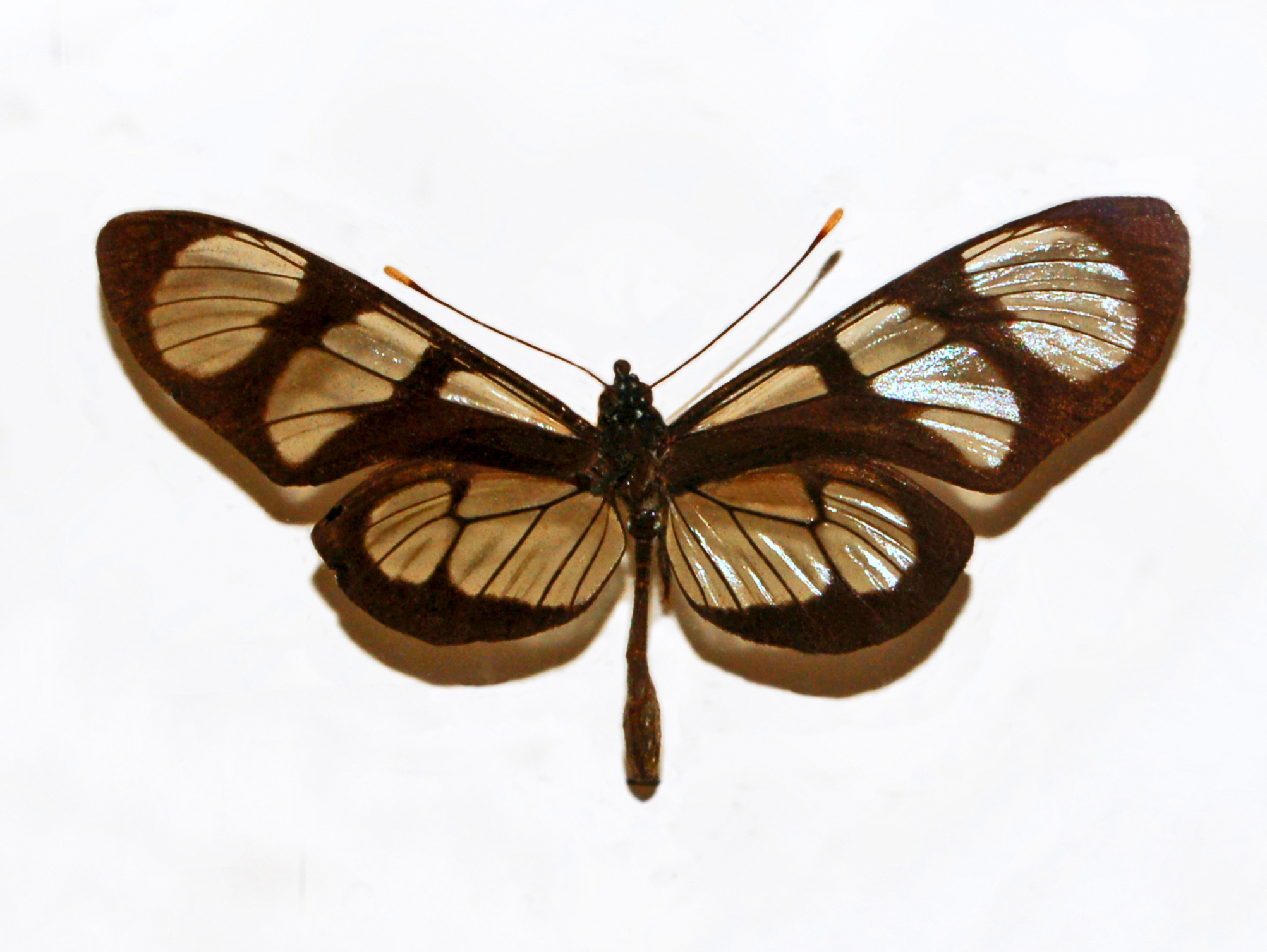
- Upperside of Methona themisto. Mounted specimen

Scientific classification
- Domain: Eukaryota
- Kingdom: Animalia
- Phylum: Arthropoda
- Class: Insecta
- Order: Lepidoptera
- Family: Nymphalidae
- Genus: Methona
- Species: M. themisto

Binomial name
- Methona themisto (Hübner, 1818)

Synonyms
- Thiridia themisto Hübner, 1818; Thyridia themisto; Brown & Mielke, 1967

= Methona themisto =

Species of butterfly

Methona themisto, common name themisto amberwing, is a species of butterfly of the family Nymphalidae.

== Description ==
Methona themisto has a wingspan of about 8–10 centimetres (3.1–3.9 in). Wings are transparent pale yellow with black veins, black margins and black cross-bars on the forewings. The hind wings are very round. The margins of the upperside of the hindwings and the apex of the upperside of the forewings show a series of small white-blue spots. Antennae are black, with yellowish tip.

The adult feeds on the nectar of flowers while the larva feeds on several species of Solanaceae (mainly Brunfelsia pilosa and Brunfelsia uniflora). Females lay white eggs on the underside of fresh leaves. Caterpillars are black with 12 yellow rings. They take about 30 days to reach the last stage. The pupa is pale yellow with black markings.

== Distribution ==
Methona themisto can be found in Brazil and Panama. This quite common species prefers forest habitat.

== Gallery ==
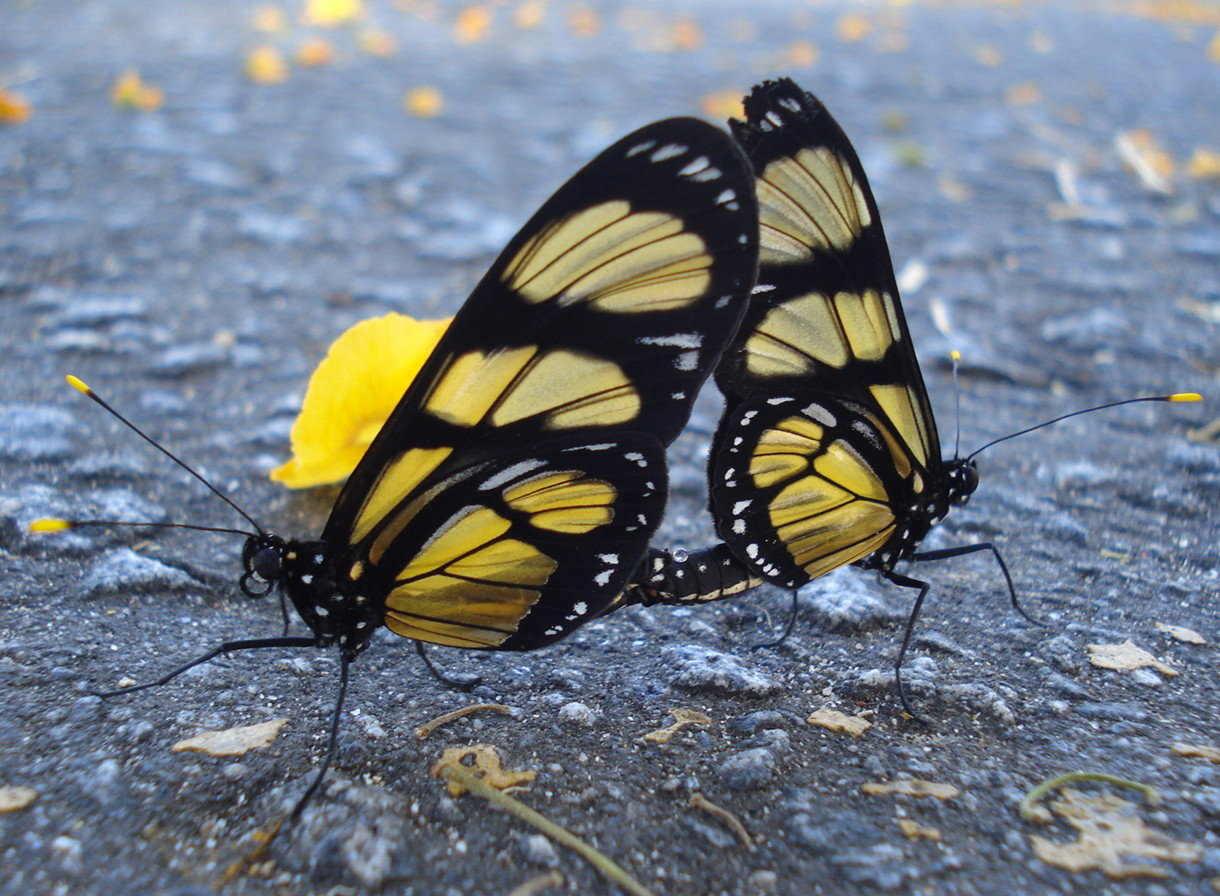
Mating

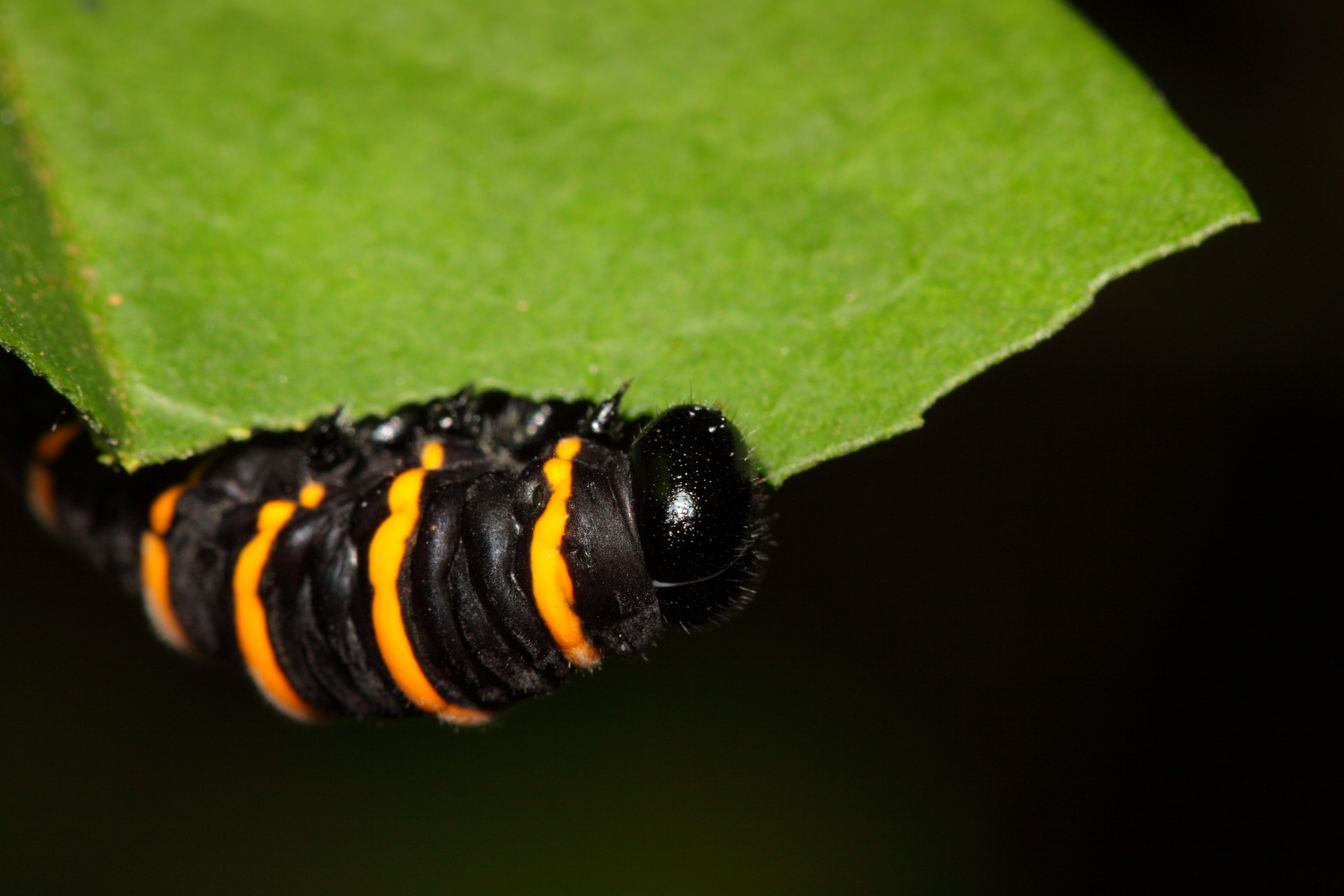
Caterpillar

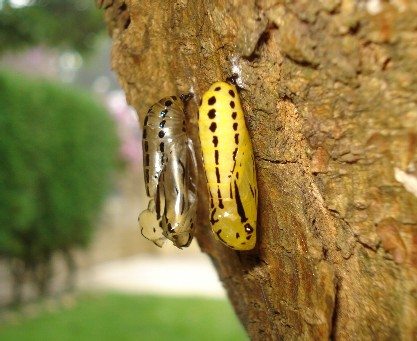
Chrysalis

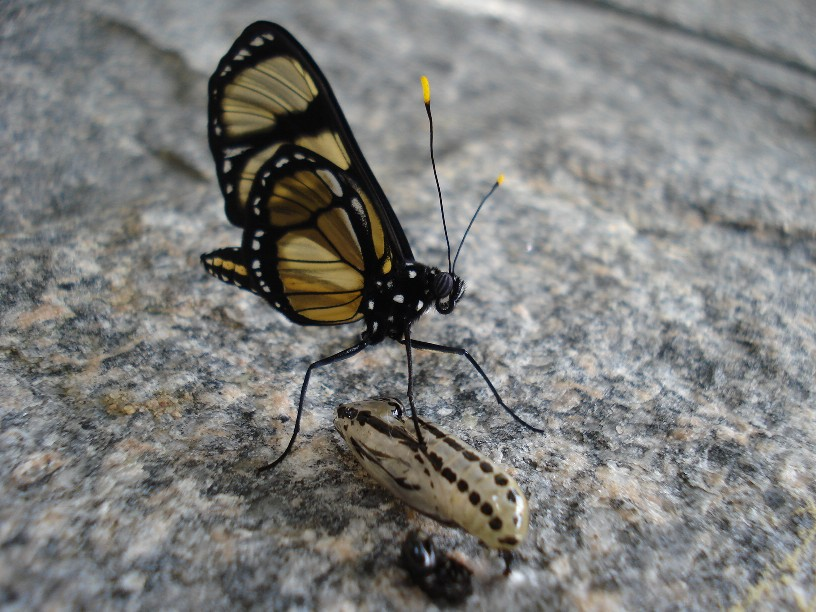
Newborn
