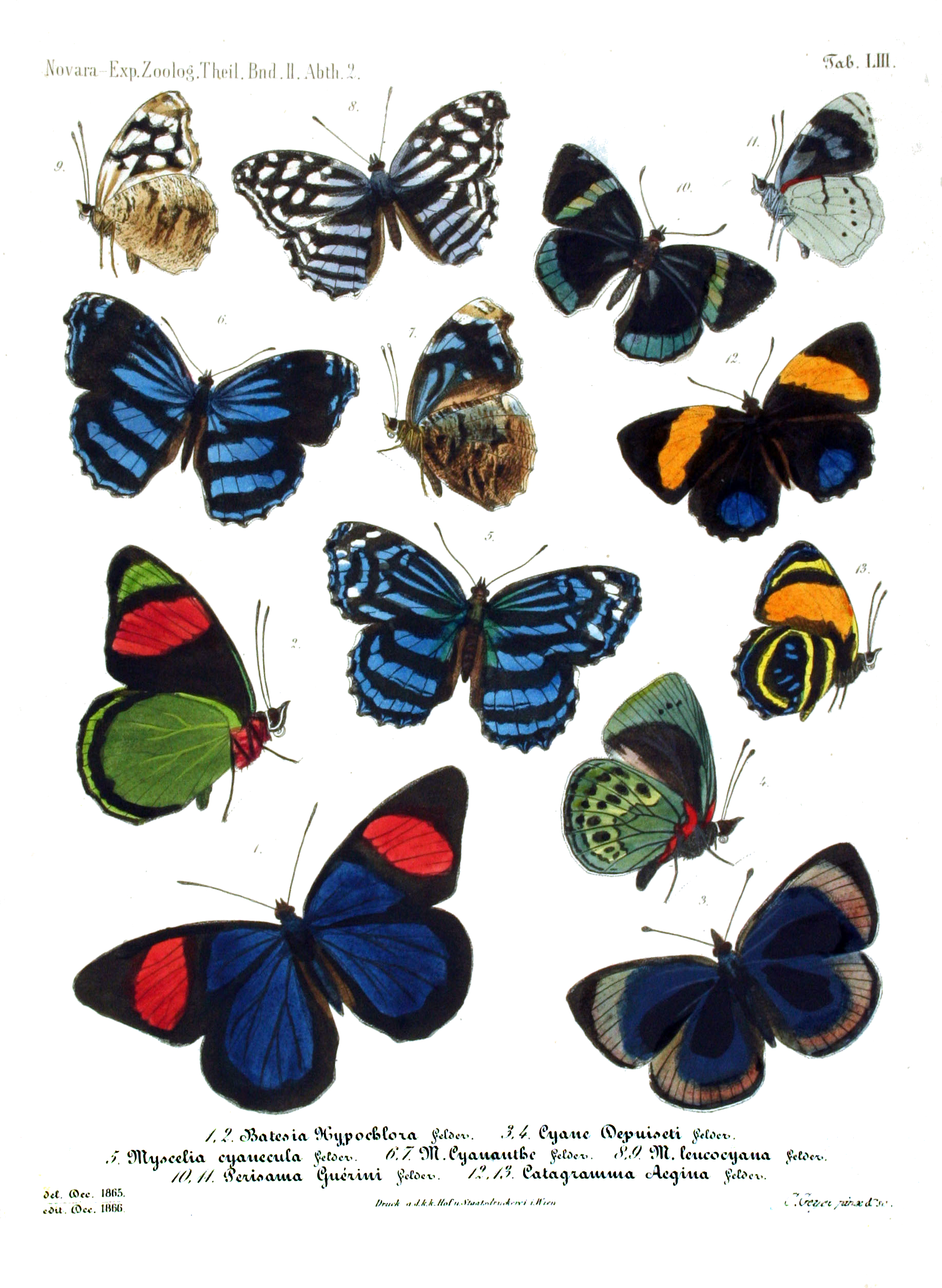

Scientific classification
- Kingdom: Animalia
- Phylum: Arthropoda
- Clade: Pancrustacea
- Class: Insecta
- Order: Lepidoptera
- Superfamily: Papilionoidea
- Family: Nymphalidae; Rafinesque, 1815

Subfamilies
- Apaturinae; Biblidinae; Calinaginae; Charaxinae; Cyrestinae; Danainae; Heliconiinae; Libytheinae; Limenitidinae; Morphinae; Nymphalinae; Satyrinae; and see text

Diversity
- Over 600 genera About 5,700 species

= Nymphalidae =

Largest butterfly family

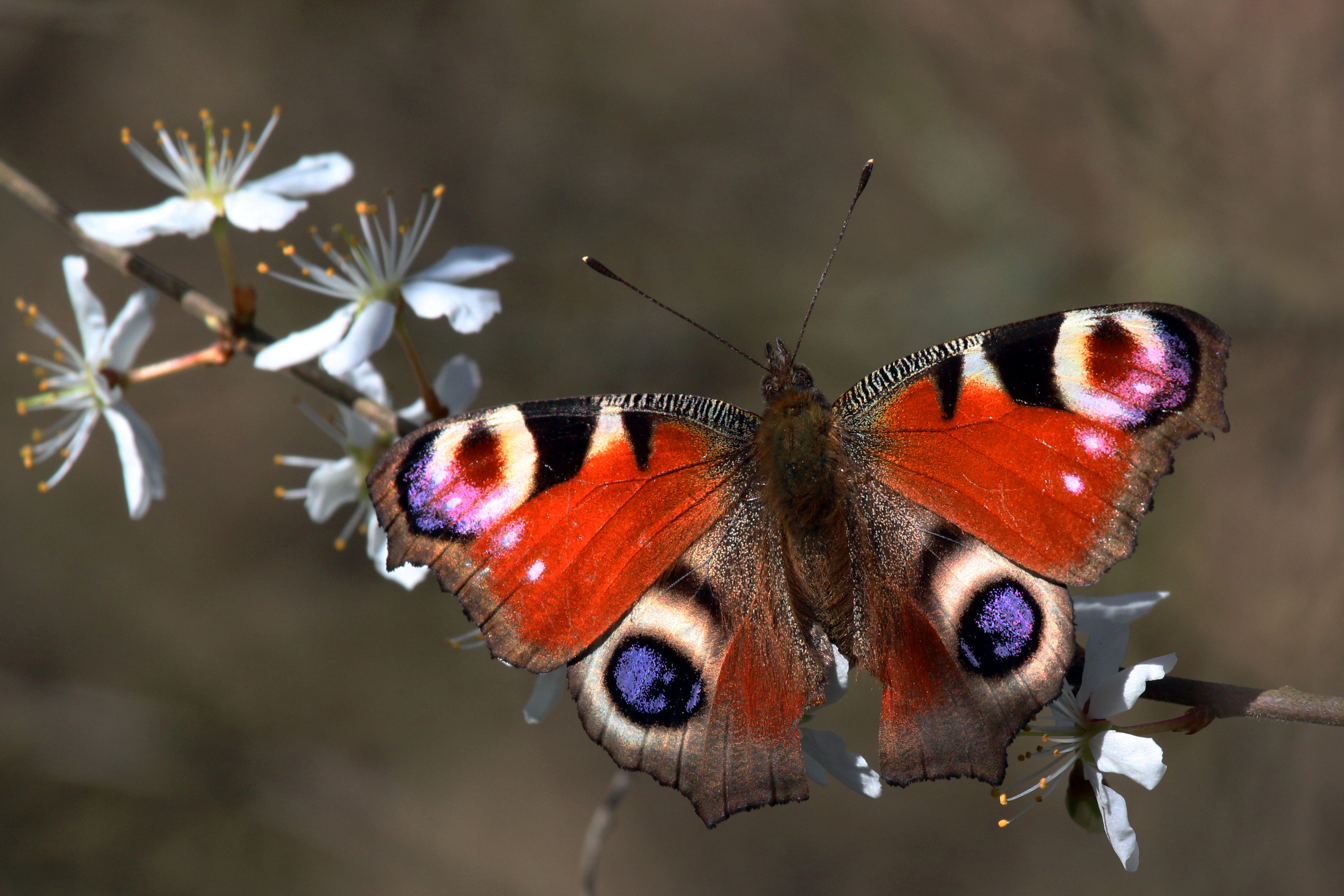
Peacock (Aglais io)

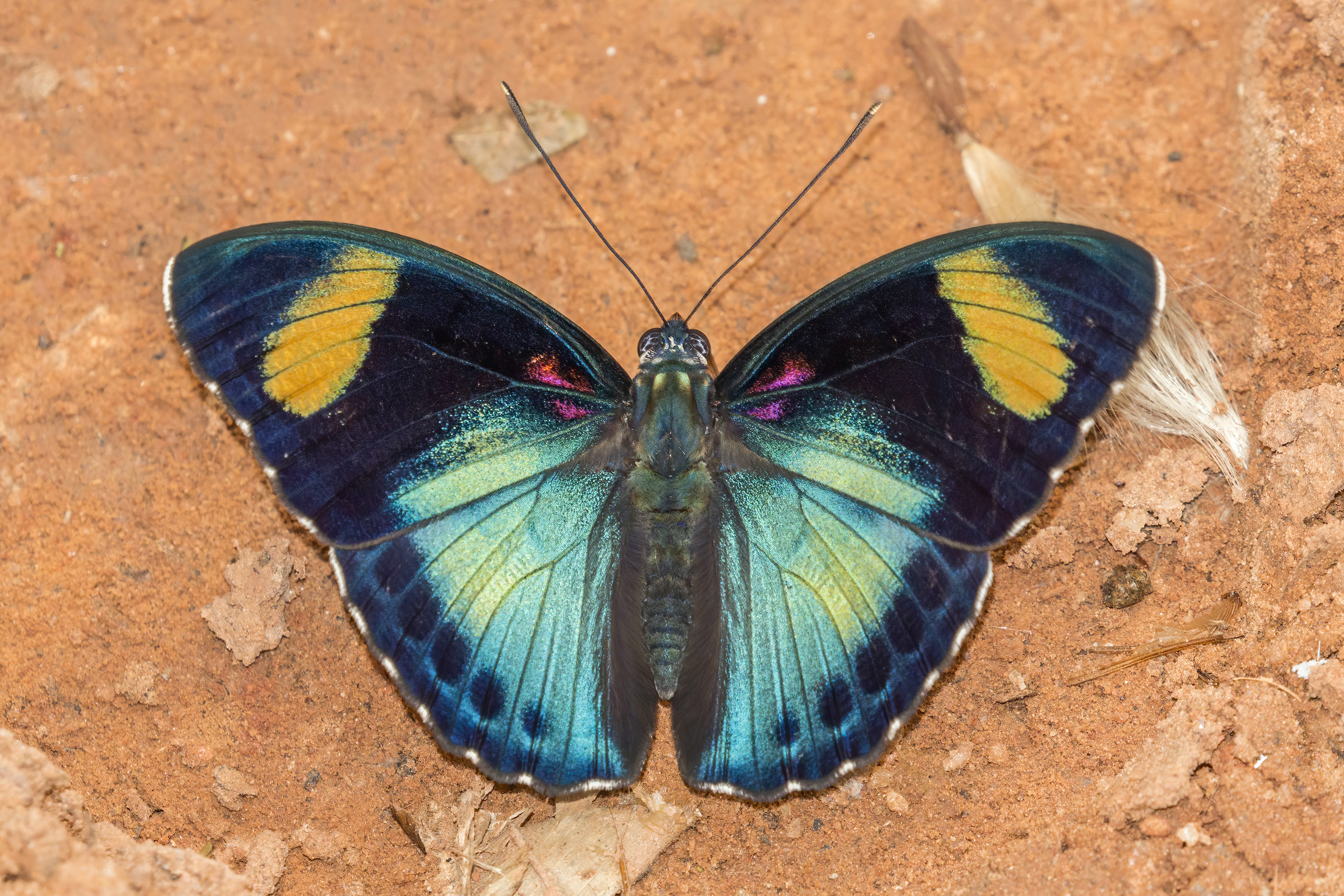
Crimson-spotted forester (Euphaedra themis)

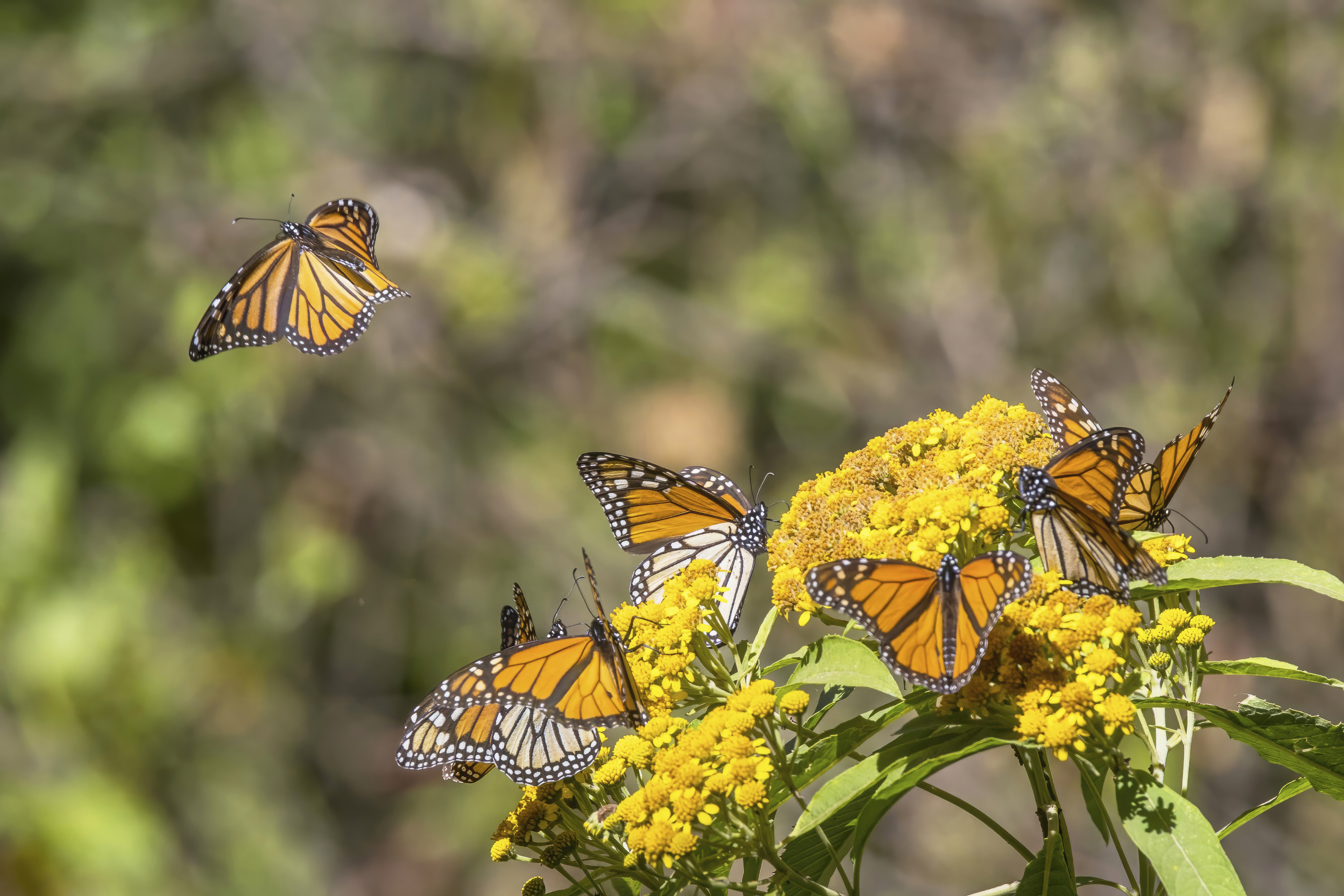
Monarch butterflies (Danaus plexippus)

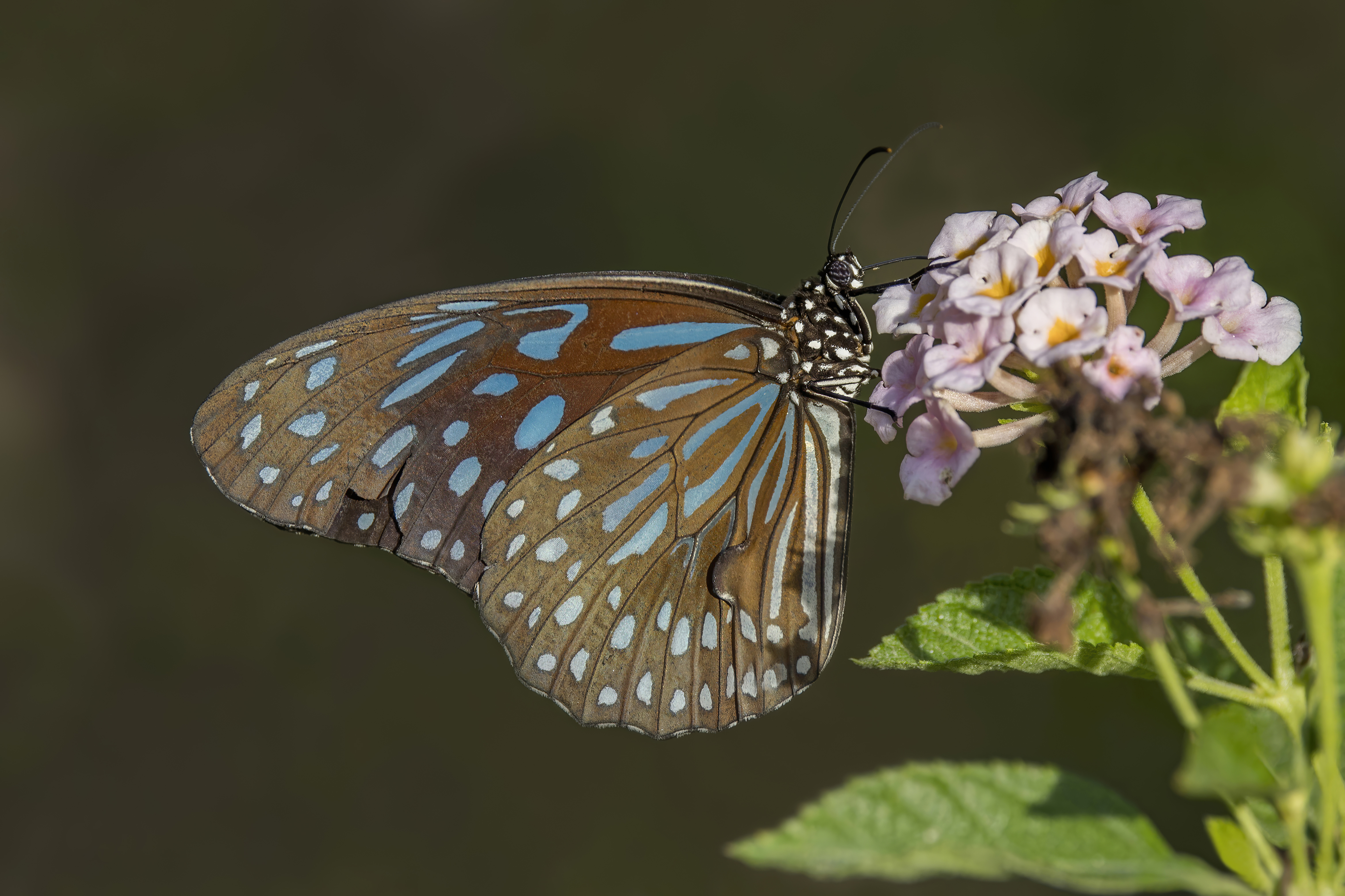
Dark blue tiger (Tirumala septentrionis)

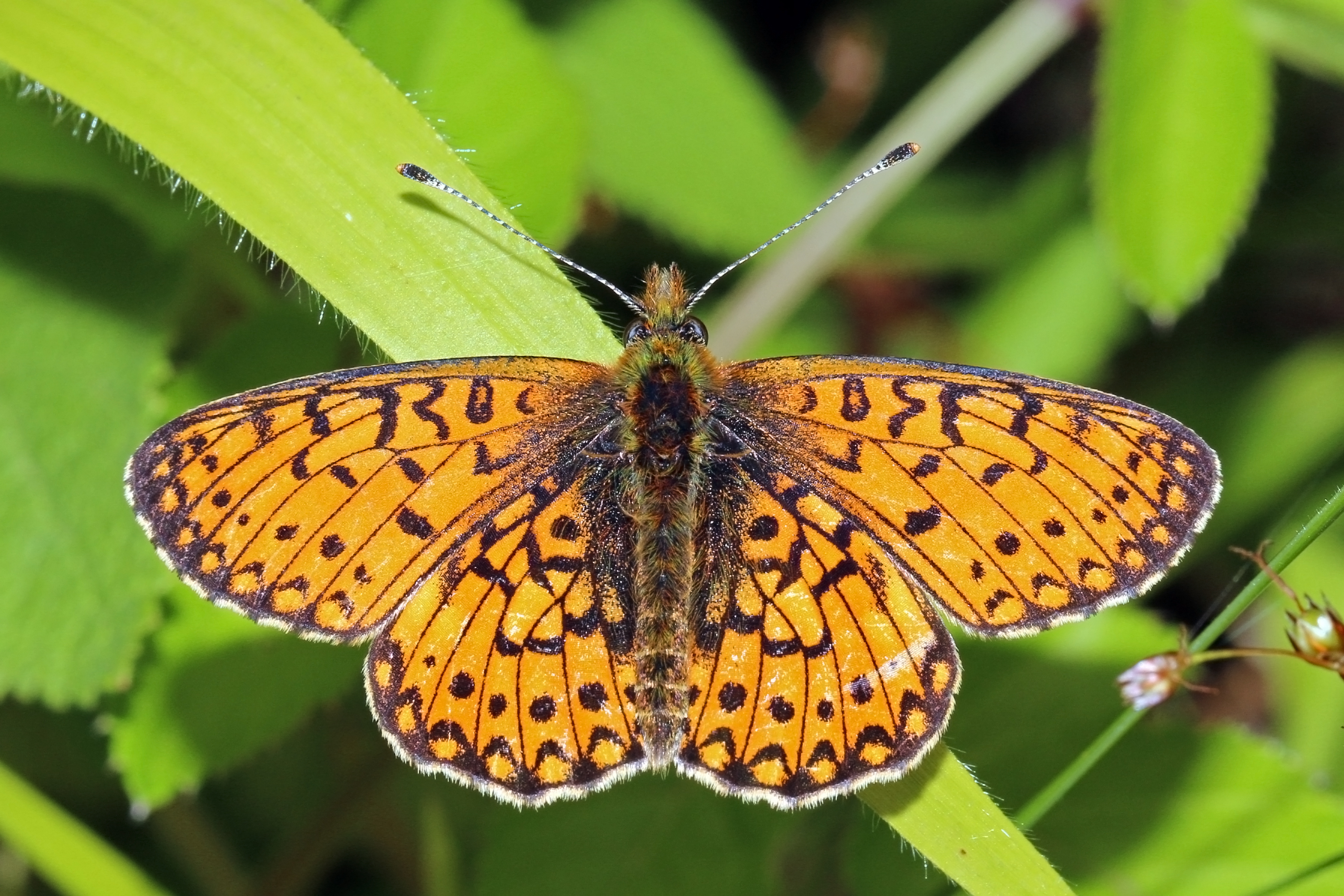
Small pearl-bordered fritillary (Boloria selene)

Crescent butterfly nectaring on yellow ironweed

The Nymphalidae are the largest family of butterflies, with more than 6,000 species distributed throughout most of the world. Belonging to the superfamily Papilionoidea, they are usually medium-sized to large butterflies. Most species have a reduced pair of forelegs and many hold their colourful wings flat when resting. They are also called brush-footed butterflies or four-footed butterflies, because they are known to stand on only four legs while the other two are curled up; in some species, these forelegs have a brush-like set of hairs, which gives this family its other common name. Many species are brightly coloured and include popular species such as the emperors, monarch butterfly, admirals, tortoiseshells, and fritillaries. However, the under wings are, in contrast, often dull and in some species look remarkably like dead leaves, or are much paler, producing a cryptic effect that helps the butterflies blend into their surroundings.

== Nomenclature ==
Rafinesque introduced the name Nymphalia as a subfamily name in diurnal Lepidoptera. Rafinesque did not include Nymphalis among the listed genera, but Nymphalis was unequivocally implied in the formation of the name (Code Article 11.7.1.1). The attribution of the Nymphalidae to Rafinesque has now been widely adopted.

== Morphology ==
In the adult butterflies, the first pair of legs is small or reduced, giving the family the other names of four-footed or brush-footed butterflies. The caterpillars are hairy or spiky with projections on the head, and the chrysalids have shiny spots.

The trait for which these butterflies are most known is the use of only four legs; the reason their forelegs have become vestigial is not yet completely clear. Some suggest the forelegs are used to amplify the sense of smell, because some species possess a brush-like set of soft hair called setae, which has led researchers to believe the forelegs are used to improve signaling and communication between the species, while standing in the other four. This ability proves useful in terms of reproduction and the overall health of the species, and it is the leading theory so far.

The forewings have the submedial vein (vein 1) unbranched and in one subfamily forked near the base; the medial vein has three branches, veins 2, 3, and 4; veins 5 and 6 arise from the points of junction of the discocellulars; the subcostal vein and its continuation beyond the apex of cell, vein 7, has never more than four branches, veins 8–11; 8 and 9 always arise from vein 7, 10, and 11 sometimes from vein 7 but more often free, i.e., given off by the subcostal vein before apex of the cell.

The hindwings have internal (1a) and precostal veins. The cell in both wings is closed or open, often closed in the fore, open in the hindwing. The dorsal margin of the hindwing is channelled to receive the abdomen in many of the forms.

The antennae always have two grooves on the underside; the club is variable in shape. Throughout the family, the front pair of legs in the male, and with three exceptions (Libythea, Pseudergolis, and Calinaga) in the female also, is reduced in size and functionally impotent; in some, the atrophy of the forelegs is considerable, e.g., the Danainae and Satyrinae. In many of the forms of these subfamilies, the forelegs are kept pressed against the underside of the thorax, and are in the male often very inconspicuous.

=== Distribution and habitat ===
Several species within the Nymphalidae family have exhibited notable phenological shifts, such as earlier spring emergence, in response to rising global temperatures. These shifts reflect evolutionary plasticity, but they may also lead to mismatches with host plant availability and pollination networks, potentially impacting long-term survival and ecological roles.

=== Systematics and phylogeny ===
The phylogeny of the Nymphalidae is complex. Several taxa are of unclear position, reflecting the fact that some subfamilies were formerly well-recognized as distinct families due to insufficient study.

The five main clades within the family are:

The libytheine clade (basal)

- Libytheinae (snout butterflies, earlier treated as the distinct family Libytheidae)

The danaine clade (basal)

- Danainae (milkweed butterflies, earlier treated as the distinct family Danaidae)

Host plant families include Apocynaceae, Asclepiadoideae (subfamily of Apocynaceae), and Moraceae.
- Ithomiini (about 300 Neotropical species, sometimes considered a subfamily Ithomiinae)

Most species have long wings, and some have transparent wings. Host plants are in the families Apocynaceae, Gesneriaceae, and Solanaceae.

- Tellervini (about 6–10 species in Australasia, sometimes considered a subfamily Tellervinae)

Caterpillars resemble those of the Danainae and feed on Apocynaceae.

The satyrine clade

- Calinaginae (about six species, restricted to the Himalayas)

Mimics of the Danainae, they are restricted to host plants in the family Moraceae.

- Charaxinae

Tropical canopy butterflies, the caterpillars often have head spines or projections. Mostly edible species, have some Batesian mimics. Host plants are in the families Annonaceae, Celastraceae, Convolvulaceae, Euphorbiaceae, Fabaceae, Flacourtiaceae, Lauraceae, Myrtaceae, Piperaceae, Poaceae, Rhamnaceae, Rutaceae, Santalaceae, and Sapindaceae.

- Morphinae (including Amathusiini, sometimes considered a subfamily Amathusiinae)

Include the spectacular neotropical Morpho, its food plants include the Arecaceae, Bignoniaceae, Fabaceae, Menispermaceae, Poaceae, and Sapindaceae.
- Brassolini (owls, neotropical with 70–80 species, mostly crepuscular, sometimes considered a subfamily Brassolinae)

Host plants in the families Arecaceae, Bromeliaceae, Heliconiaceae, Musaceae, and Poaceae.

- Satyrinae (satyrs and browns, earlier treated as distinct family Satyridae)

Host plants are in the families Arecaceae, Araceae, Cyperaceae, Heliconiaceae, Poaceae, and Selaginellaceae.

The heliconiine clade (sister group of the nymphaline clade, excludes former tribes Biblidini and Cyrestini, and tribes Pseudergolini and Coeini)

- Heliconiinae (earlier treated as distinct family Heliconiidae)

Colourful tropical butterflies, they are noted for Müllerian mimicry. All species use host plants in the family Passifloraceae.
- Acraeini (mostly African, but some species in Asia, sometimes considered a family Acraeinae)

Host plants are in the families Asteraceae, Passifloraceae, Sterculiaceae, Tiliaceae, and Urticaceae.

- Limenitidinae

The nymphaline clade (sister group of the heliconiine clade, also includes tribes Coeini and Pseudergolini)

- Apaturinae (mostly tropical)

Host plants are in the family Ulmaceae. Caterpillars are smooth with bifid tails and horns on the head.

- Biblidinae (formerly in Limenitidinae)
- Cyrestinae (formerly in Limenitidinae)
- Nymphalinae (a large subfamily that sometimes includes the Limenitidinae and Biblidinae)

Some species migrate. Caterpillars are sometimes covered in spines. Host plants include Acanthaceae, Caprifoliaceae, Convolvulaceae, Euphorbiaceae, Fagaceae, Flacourtiaceae, Lamiaceae, Loranthaceae, Moraceae, Plantaginaceae, Poaceae, Rubiaceae, Rutaceae, Salicaceae, Sapindaceae, Scrophulariaceae, Urticaceae, and Verbenaceae.

=== Example species from this family ===
- Actinote zikani, genus Actinote
- Archdukes, genus Lexias
- California tortoiseshell, Nymphalis californica
- Comma, Polygonia c-album
- Common buckeye, Junonia coenia
- Common snout butterfly, Libytheana carinenta
- Cracker butterflies, genus Hamadryas
- Crimson patch, Chlosyne janais
- Edith's checkerspot, Euphydryas editha
- Grayling (butterfly), Hipparchia semele
- Hackberry emperor, Asterocampa celtis
- Lorquin's admiral, Limenitis lorquini
- Marsh fritillary, Euphydryas aurinia
- Meadow brown, Maniola jurtina
- Mourning cloak, Nymphalis antiopa
- Monarch butterfly, Danaus plexippus
- Blue morpho, Morpho menelaus
- Painted lady, Vanessa cardui
- Peacock, Aglais io
- Plain tiger, Danaus chrysippus
- Question mark, Polygonia interrogationis
- Red admiral, Vanessa atalanta
- Small heath, Coenonympha pamphilus
- Small tortoiseshell, Nymphalis urticae
- Gatekeeper, Pyronia tithonus
- Small pearl-bordered fritillary, Boloria selene
- Andromeda satyr, Cithaerias andromeda
- Texan crescentspot butterfly, Anthanassa texana texana
- Zerene fritillary, Speyeria zerene (includes several subspecies such as Oregon silverspot, Speyeria zerene hippolyta)

== See also ==
- List of fritillaries (butterflies)
