= Hansch =

Hansch or Hänsch or at times Haensch is a German surname. Notable people with the surname include:

== Persons ==
=== Hansch ===
- Anton Hansch (1813–1876), Austrian painter
- Corwin Hansch (1918–2011), American chemist and academic

=== Hänsch ===
- Klaus Hänsch (1938-2026), German politician
- Ralph Hansch (1924–2008), Canadian ice hockey player
- Theodor W. Hänsch (born 1941), German physicist

=== Haensch ===
- Annemarie Haensch, German table tennis player
- Günther Haensch (1923–2018), German linguist and lexicographer
- Richard Haensch German entomologist and insect dealer

== See also ==
- Haenschia, a genus of clearwing (ithomiine) butterflies
- "Hänschen klein" German folk song by Franz Wiedemann (1821–1882)
