= Eutresis (disambiguation) =

Eutresis is a genus of clearwing butterflies.

Eutresis may also refer to:

- Eutresis (Arcadia), a Greek town in ancient Arcadia
- Eutresis (Boeotia), a Greek town in ancient Boeotia
