= Aeria =

Aeria may refer to:

- Aeria Games and Entertainment
- Aeria (genus), a nymphalid butterfly genus in the tribe Ithomiini
- 369 Aëria, a large main belt asteroid discovered on July 4, 1893
