= Aremfoxia =

- d

Scientific classification
- Kingdom: Animalia
- Phylum: Arthropoda
- Clade: Pancrustacea
- Class: Insecta
- Order: Lepidoptera
- Family: Nymphalidae
- Tribe: Ithomiini
- Genus: Aremfoxia; Real in Fox & Real, 1971
- Species: A. ferra

Binomial name
- Aremfoxia ferra (Haensch, 1909)

Monotypic brush-footed butterfly genus

Aremfoxia is a monotypic genus of clearwing (ithomiine) butterflies in the brush-footed butterfly family, Nymphalidae. The genus was named by Herman G. Real in 1971. Its one species, Aremfoxia ferra, was described by Richard Haensch in 1909.
