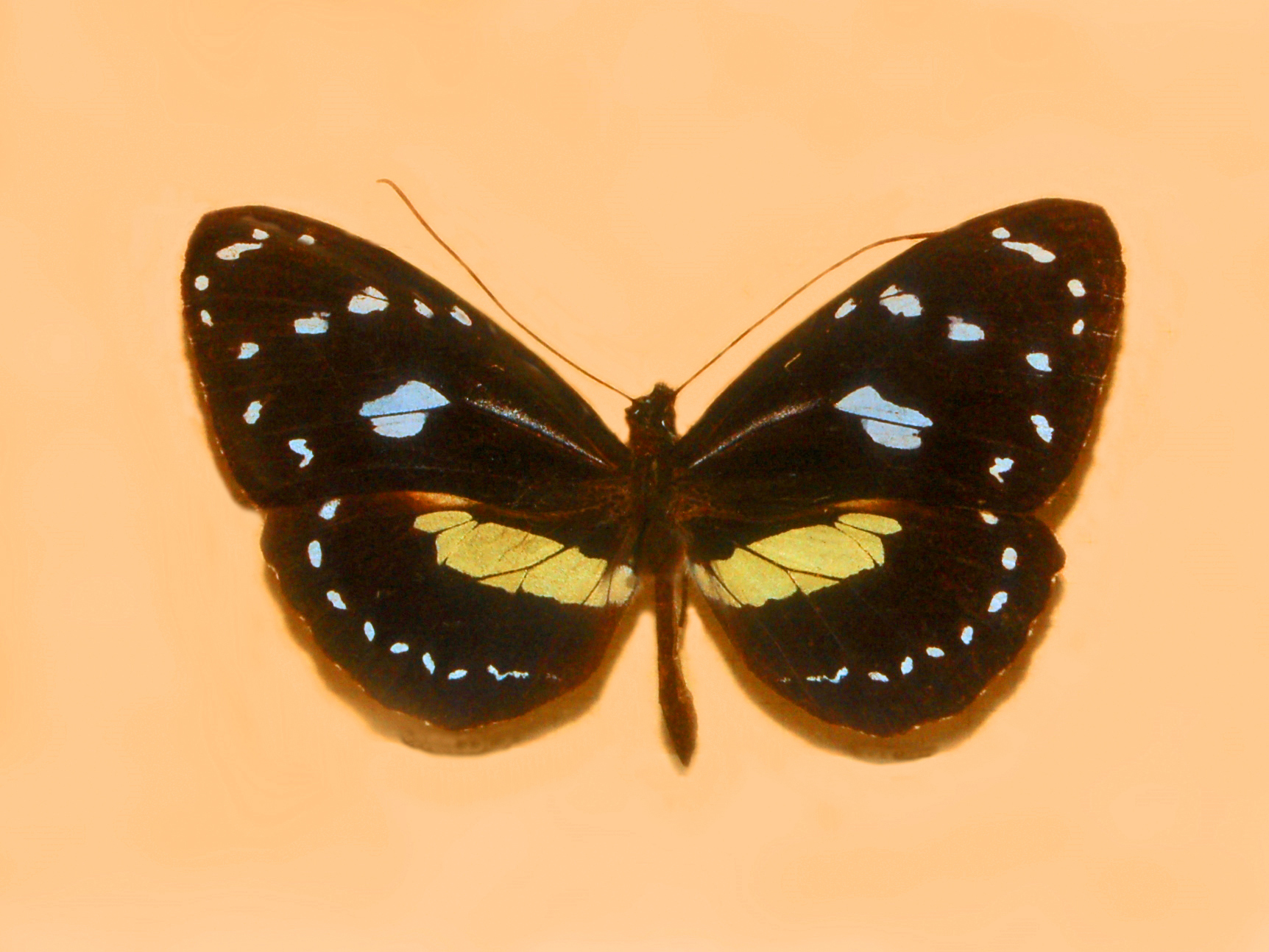
- E. h. bomplandii from Colombia

Scientific classification
- Kingdom: Animalia
- Phylum: Arthropoda
- Class: Insecta
- Order: Lepidoptera
- Family: Nymphalidae
- Genus: Elzunia
- Species: E. humboldt

Binomial name
- Elzunia humboldt (Latreille, 1809)

Synonyms
- Heliconius humboldt Latreille, 1809; Tithorea descandollesi Staudinger, 1885; Tithorea humboldtii flavomaculata Staudinger, 1885; Tithorea humboldtii latreillei Staudinger, 1885; Helicona bonplandii Guérin-Méneville, [1844]; Tithorea tamasea Hewitson, 1873; Tithorea tamasea f. lugubris Haensch, 1909; Tithorea cassandrina microguttata Röber, 1927; Tithorea cassandrina Srnka, 1885; Tithorea dagua Stichel, 1903; Tithorea bonplandii faba Weymer, 1909; Elzunia humboldtii coxeyi Fox, 1941

= Elzunia humboldt =

Species of butterfly

Elzunia humboldt is a species of butterfly of the family Nymphalidae, subfamily Danainae, tribus Ithomiini.

== Description ==
Elzunia humboldt has a wingspan of about 80–85 millimetres (3.1–3.3 in). This species is quite variable depending on the subspecies. The uppersides of the wings are black, with a series of small white spots on the margins. At the base of the hindwings usually there is a broad yellow band, while in the middle of the forewings usually there are one or more white spots. The undersides of the wings have a similar pattern to the uppersides, but the basic colour is reddish instead of black and the hindwings usually have two series of white spots.

== Distribution ==
This species can be found in Colombia, Ecuador and Peru.

== Subspecies ==
- E. h. humboldt (Colombia)
- E. h. bonplandii (Guérin-Méneville, [1844]) (Colombia)
- E. h. cassandrina Srnka, 1884 (Ecuador)
- E. h. regalis (Stichel, 1903) (Colombia)
- E. h. albomaculata (Haensch, 1903) (Ecuador)
- E. h. joiceyi (Kaye, 1918) (Colombia)
- E. h. atahualpa Fox, 1956 (Peru)
- E. h. judsoni Fox, 1956 (Peru)

== Etymology ==
The butterfly was named to honour the German explorer Alexander von Humboldt.
