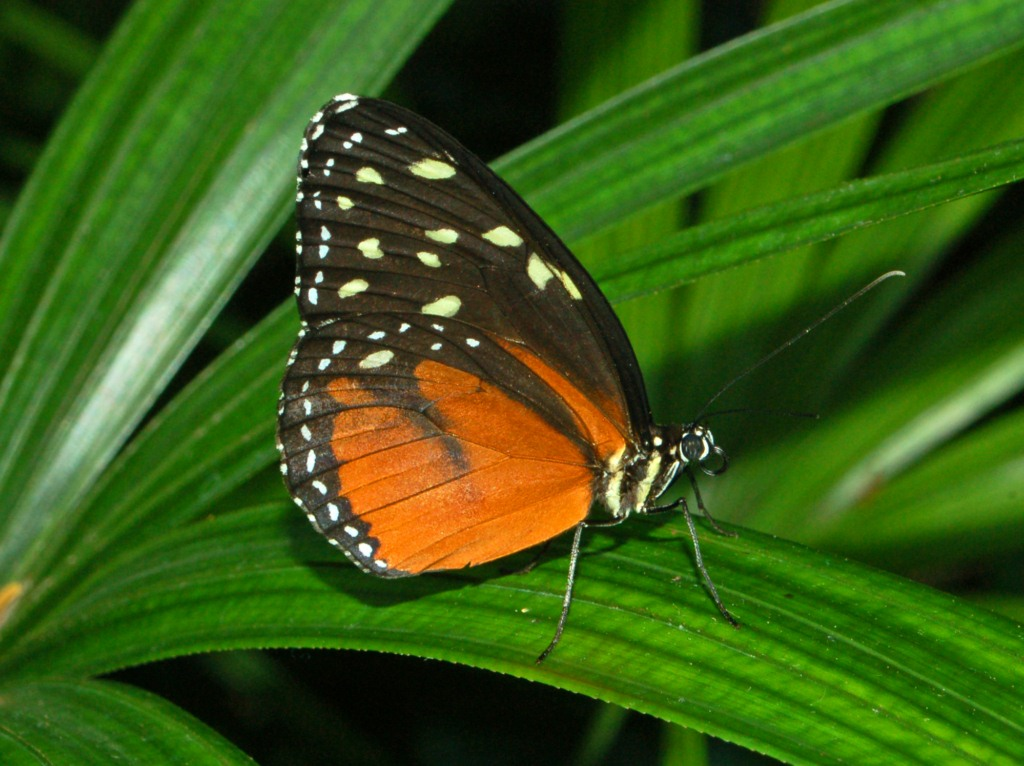

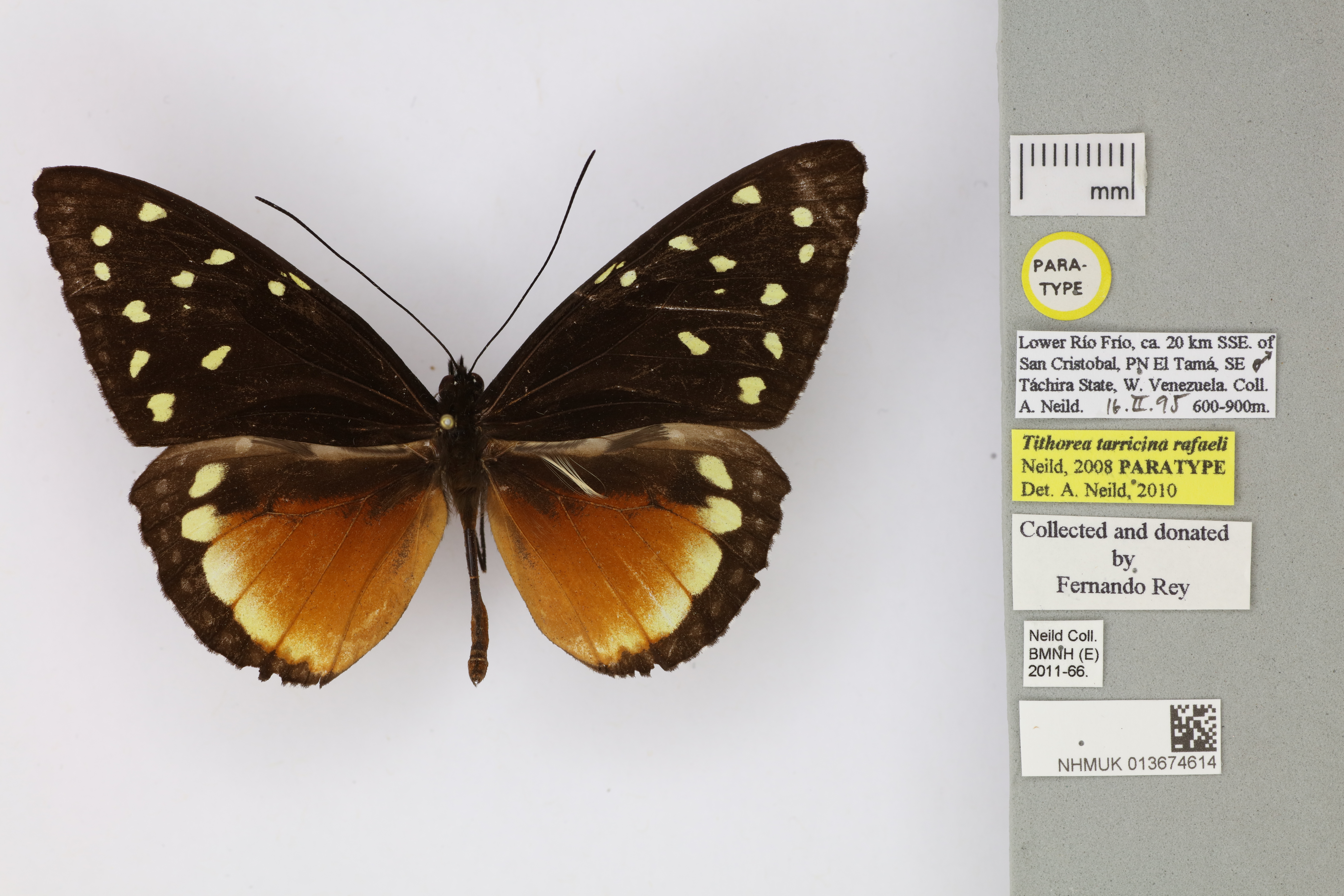

Scientific classification
- Kingdom: Animalia
- Phylum: Arthropoda
- Class: Insecta
- Order: Lepidoptera
- Family: Nymphalidae
- Genus: Tithorea
- Species: T. tarricina

Binomial name
- Tithorea tarricina Hewitson, 1858

Synonyms
- Tithorea duenna Bates, 1864; Tithorea anachoreta Thieme, 1903; Tithorea pinthias Godman & Salvin, 1878; Tithorea monosticta Godman & Salvin, 1897; Hirsutis pinthias f. macasica Niepelt, 1915; Tithorea pinthias melini Bryk, 1953

= Tithorea tarricina =

Species of butterfly

Tithorea tarricina, the tarricina longwing, variable presonian, or cream-spotted tigerwing, is a species of butterfly belonging to the family Nymphalidae.

== Description ==
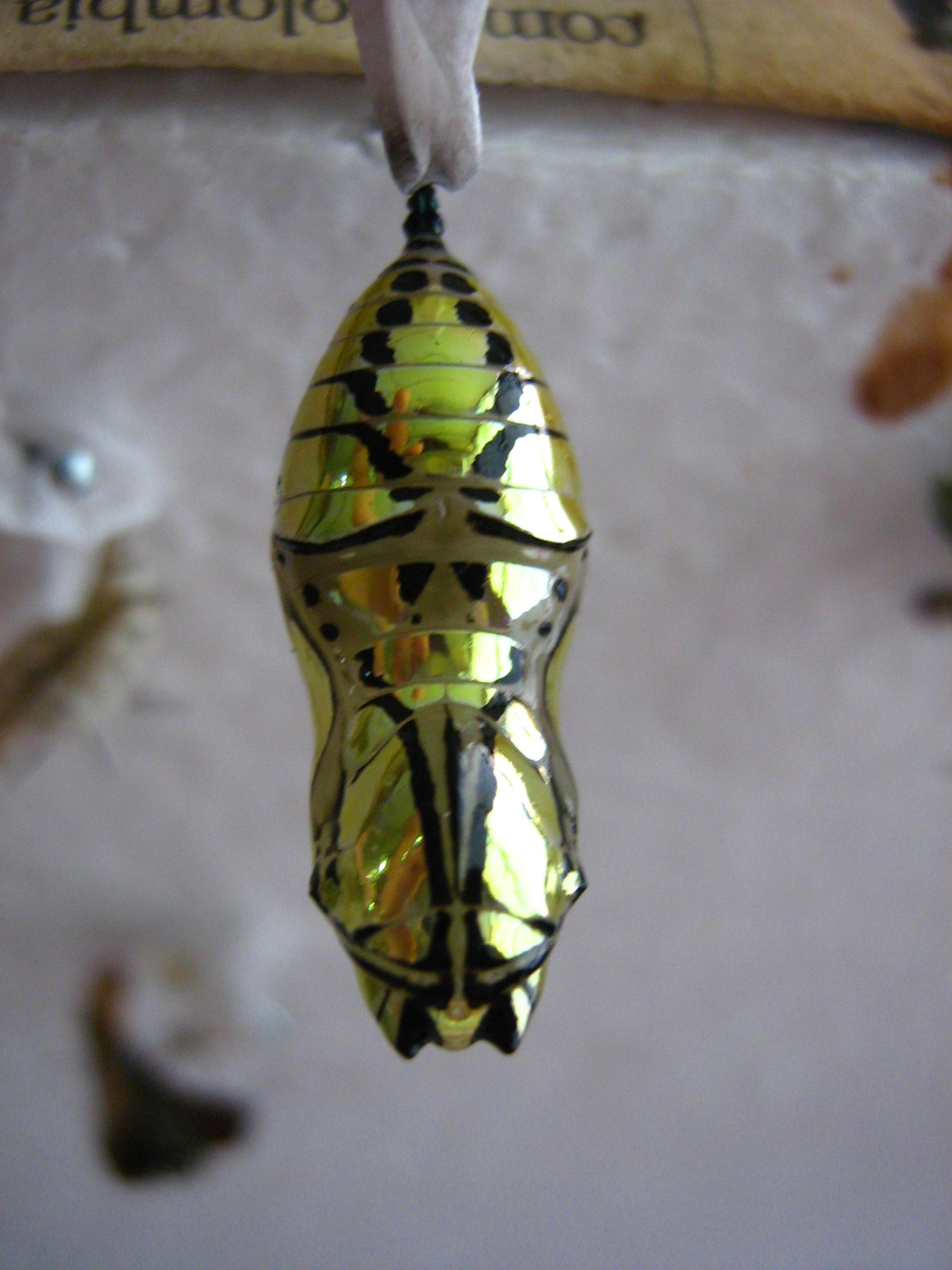
The golden chrysalis of Tithorea tarricina

Tithorea tarricina has a wingspan reaching about 75–80 millimetres (3.0–3.1 in), with a forewing of about 40 millimetres (1.6 in). The pattern of the wings is quite variable. Usually the dorsal sides of the forewings are black with white spots, while the hindwings are orange with black margins. The underside are similar, with many small white spots along the black margins. The antennae are black. The chrysalides are completely golden.

== Distribution ==
This rare species is present in Mexico and in Central and South America.

== Habitat ==
Tithorea tarricina can be found at the edges of forested areas in lowlands and mountain slopes, at an elevation up to 1,500 metres (4,900 ft) above sea level. The host plants are in the genus Prestonia (mainly P. longifolia and P. portabellensis – family Apocynaceae).

== Subspecies ==
The following subspecies are recognised:

- T. t. bonita Haensch, 1903 (Ecuador, Peru)
- T. t. duenna Bates, 1864 (Mexico to Guatemala)
- T. t. franciscoi Brown, 1977 (Venezuela)
- T. t. hecalesina C. & R. Felder, 1865 (Colombia)
- T. t. lecromi Vitale & Rodriguez, 2004 (Colombia)
- T. t. parola Godman & Salvin, 1898 (Colombia)
- T. t. pinthias Godman & Salvin, 1878 (Panama, Costa Rica, Nicaragua)
- T. t. tagarma Hewitson, 1874 (Bolivia, Peru)
- T. t. tarricina Hewitson, 1858 (Colombia)
