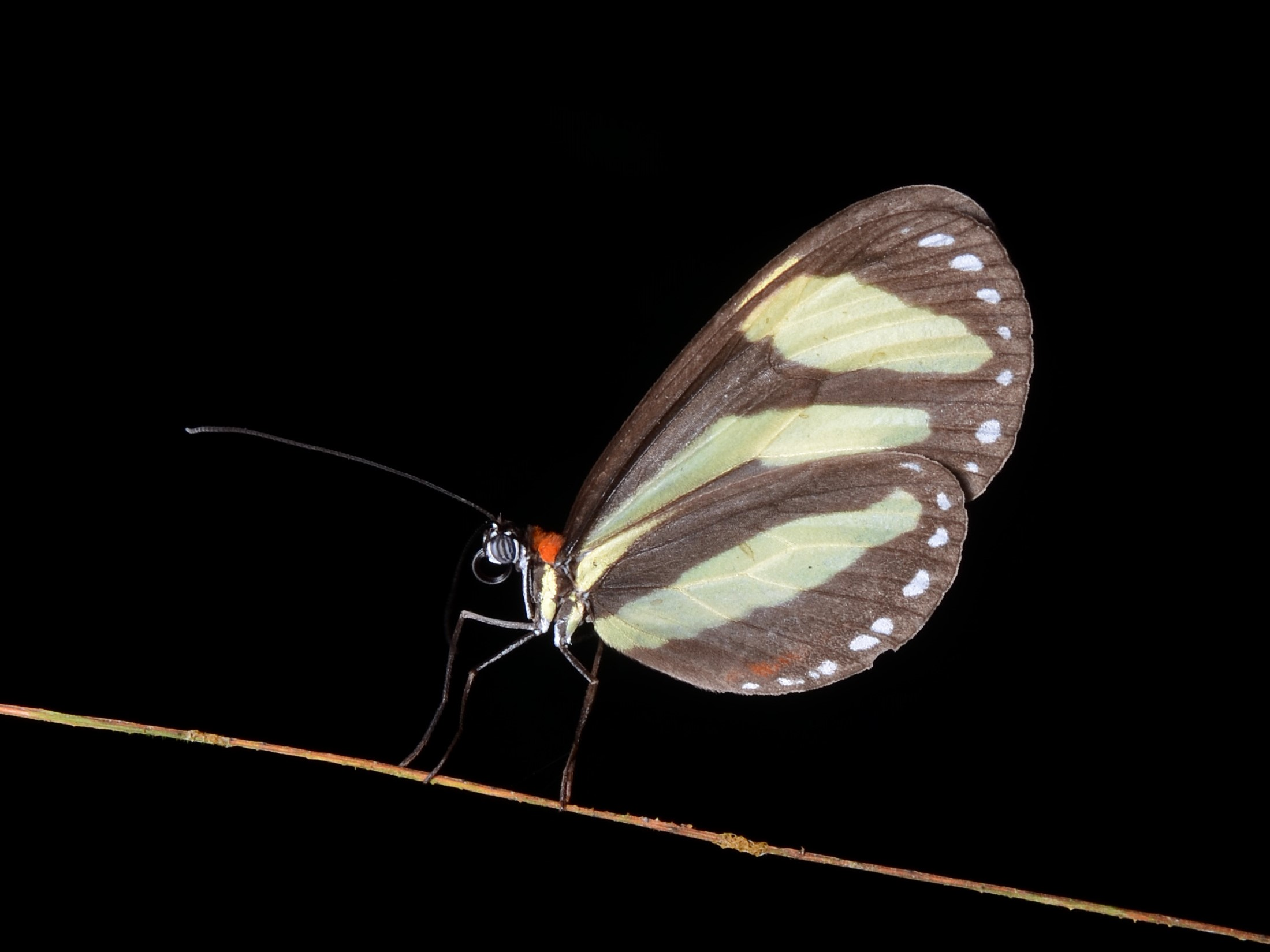

Scientific classification
- Domain: Eukaryota
- Kingdom: Animalia
- Phylum: Arthropoda
- Class: Insecta
- Order: Lepidoptera
- Family: Nymphalidae
- Genus: Aeria
- Species: A. eurimedia

Binomial name
- Aeria eurimedia (Cramer, [1777])

Synonyms
- List: Papilio eurimedia Cramer, [1777]; Ithomia eurimedia var. negricola C. & R. Felder, 1862; Aeria agna Godman & Salvin, [1879]; Ithomia indola Doubleday, [1845]; Ithomia agna Doubleday, 1847; Aeria pacifica Godman & Salvin, [1879]; Aeria sisenna palmara Haensch, 1903

= Aeria eurimedia =

Species of butterfly

Aeria eurimedia is a species of butterfly in the family Nymphalidae. It is found in Central America and northern South America.

The larvae have been recorded feeding on Prestonia portabellensis.

== Subspecies ==
- Aeria eurimedia eurimedia (Guianas, Surinam)
- Aeria eurimedia negricola (C. & R. Felder, 1862) (Peru)
- Aeria eurimedia agna Godman & Salvin, [1879] (Nicaragua to Panama and Venezuela)
- Aeria eurimedia pacifica Godman & Salvin, [1879] (Mexico, Guatemala)
- Aeria eurimedia sisenna Weymer, 1899 (Ecuador)
- Aeria eurimedia latistriga Hering, 1925 (Colombia)
