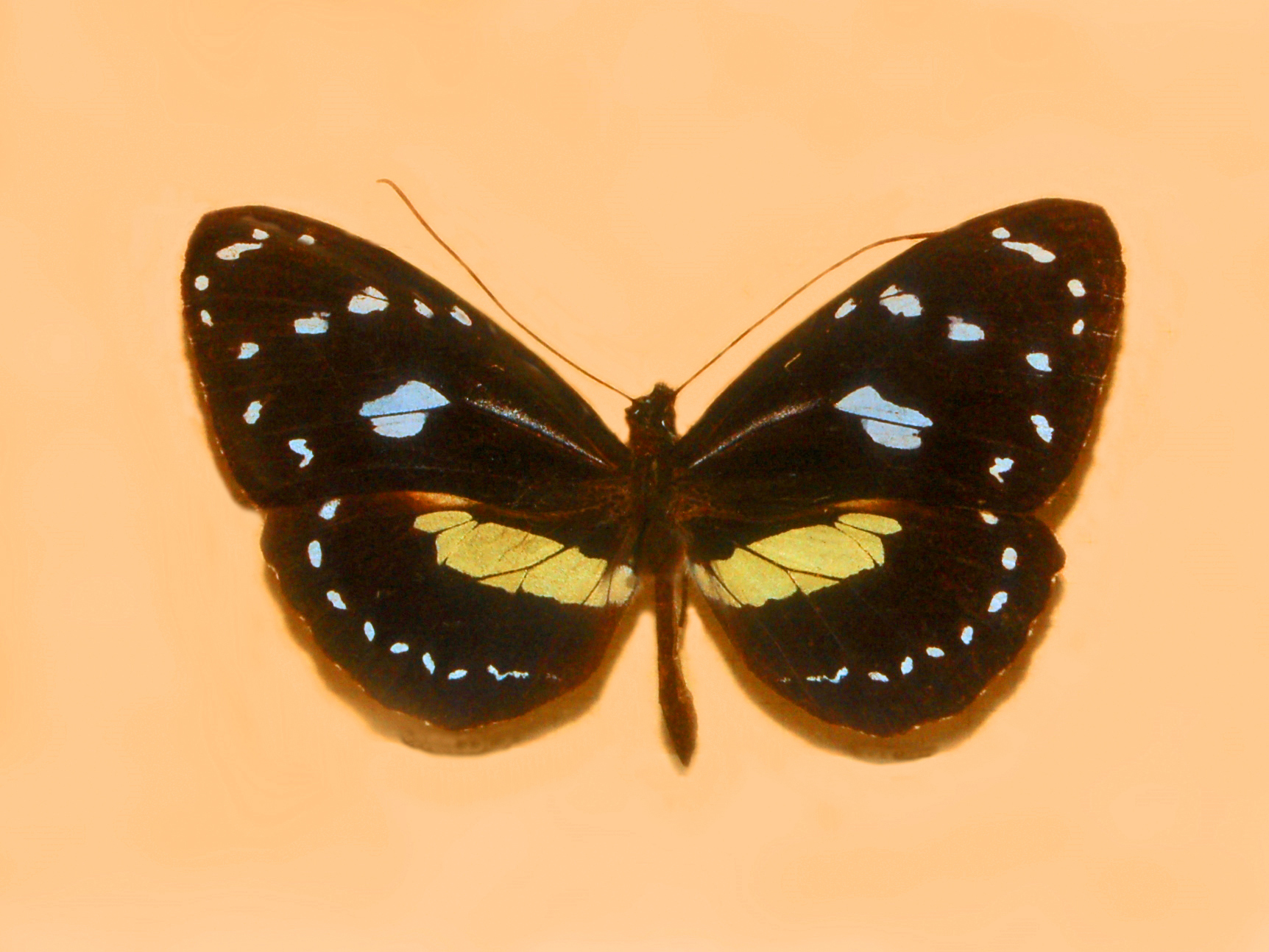
- Elzunia humboldt bomplandii from Colombia

Scientific classification
- Kingdom: Animalia
- Phylum: Arthropoda
- Class: Insecta
- Order: Lepidoptera
- Family: Nymphalidae
- Tribe: Ithomiini
- Genus: Elzunia; Bryk, 1937

= Elzunia =

Genus of brush-footed butterflies

Elzunia is a Neotropical genus of butterflies of the family Nymphalidae, subfamily Danainae, and tribe Ithomiini.

== List of species ==
- Elzunia humboldt (Latreille, 1809)
- Elzunia pavonii (Butler, 1873)
