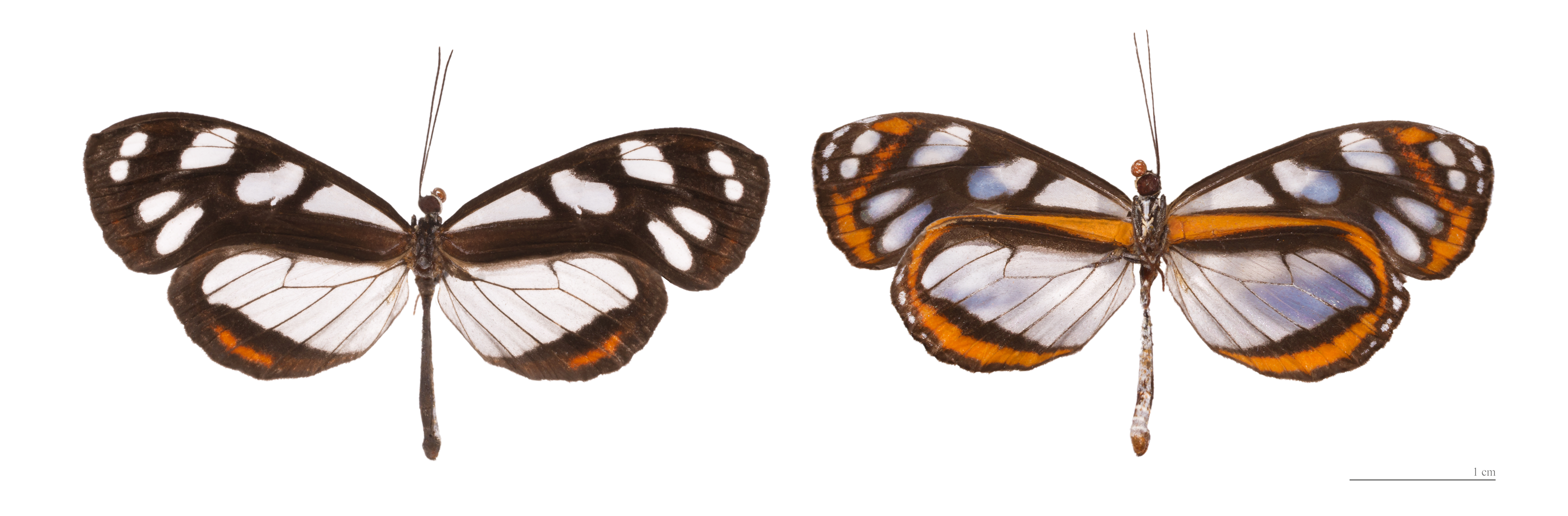
- H. i. dujardini
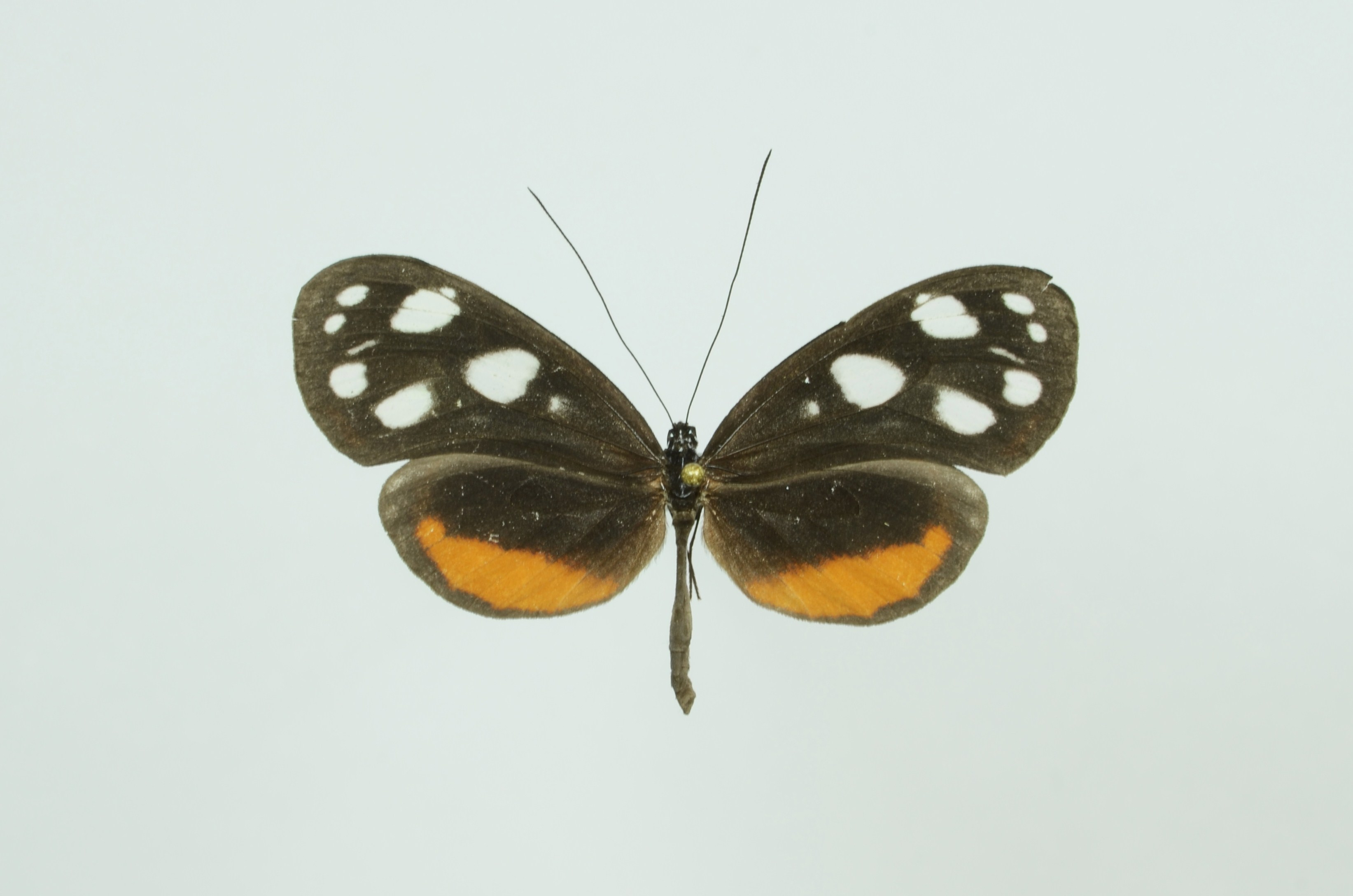
- H. i. sinilia

Scientific classification
- Domain: Eukaryota
- Kingdom: Animalia
- Phylum: Arthropoda
- Class: Insecta
- Order: Lepidoptera
- Family: Nymphalidae
- Genus: Hyposcada
- Species: H. illinissa

Binomial name
- Hyposcada illinissa (Hewitson, 1851)

Synonyms
- Ithomia illinissa Hewitson, 1851; Hyposcada multimacula Zikán, 1941; Ithomia sinilia Herrich-Schäffer, 1865; Hyposcada sinilia; Ithomia abida Hewitson, 1871; Ithomia dolabella Hewitson, 1876; Ithomia aesion Godman & Salvin, 1878; Ithomia illinissa ilerdinoides Staudinger, [1884]; Hyposcada ida Haensch, 1903; Hyposcada idina Haensch, 1905; Leucothyris illinissa brisotis Haensch, 1909

= Hyposcada illinissa =

Species of butterfly

Hyposcada illinissa, the illinissa glasswing, is a species of butterfly of the family Nymphalidae. It is found from Colombia to Bolivia. The habitat consists of lowland rainforests at altitudes between 100 and 1,100 metres.

== Subspecies ==
- H. i. illinissa (Brazil: Amazonas)
- H. i. abida (Hewitson, 1871) (Colombia)
- H. i. aesion (Godman & Salvin, 1878) (Panama, Ecuador)
- H. i. brisotis (Haensch, 1909) (Bolivia)
- H. i. cynthia Fox, 1941 (Ecuador)
- H. i. dolabella (Hewitson, 1876) (Bolivia)
- H. i. dujardini Brévignon, 1993 (Guianas)
- H. i. ida Haensch, 1903 (Ecuador)
- H. i. idina Haensch, 1905 (Peru)
- H. i. ilerdinoides (Staudinger, [1884]) (Brazil: Amazonas)
- H. i. margarita Fox, 1941 (Peru)
- H. i. napirida Zikán, 1941 (Brazil: Amazonas)
- H. i. napoensis Vitale & Bollino, 2001 (Ecuador)
- H. i. sinilia (Herrich-Schäffer, 1865) (Colombia)
- H. i. tundayme Martinez, 2008 (Ecuador)
