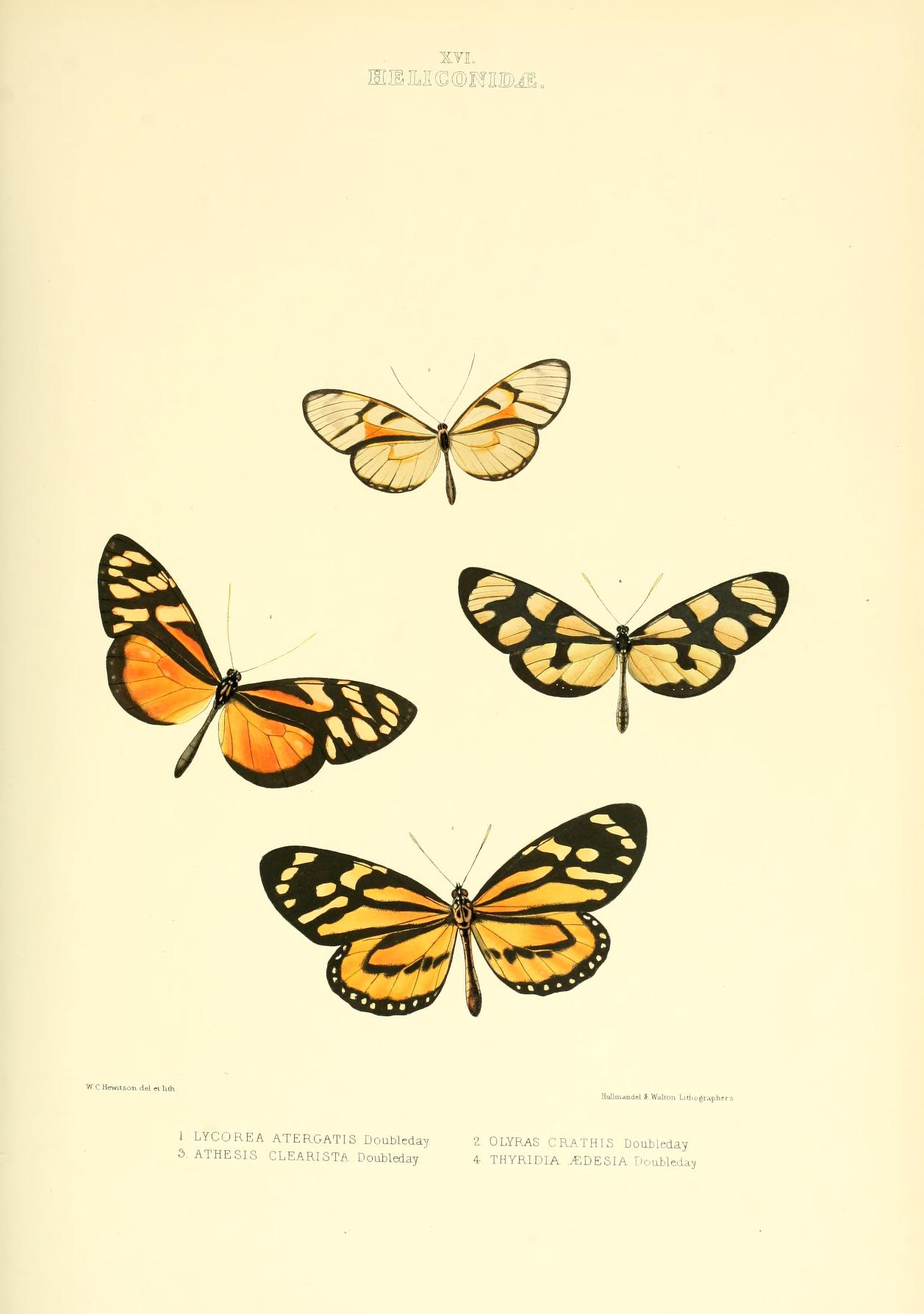
- Figure 3

Scientific classification
- Kingdom: Animalia
- Phylum: Arthropoda
- Class: Insecta
- Order: Lepidoptera
- Family: Nymphalidae
- Tribe: Ithomiini
- Genus: Olyras; Doubleday, 1847

Species
- See text

= Olyras =

Genus of brush-footed butterflies

Olyras is a genus of clearwing (ithomiine) butterflies, named by Henry Doubleday in 1847. They are in the brush-footed butterfly family, Nymphalidae.

== Species ==
Arranged alphabetically:

- Olyras crathis Doubleday, [1847]
- Olyras insignis Salvin, 1869
- Olyras theon Bates, 1866 – rusty ticlear
