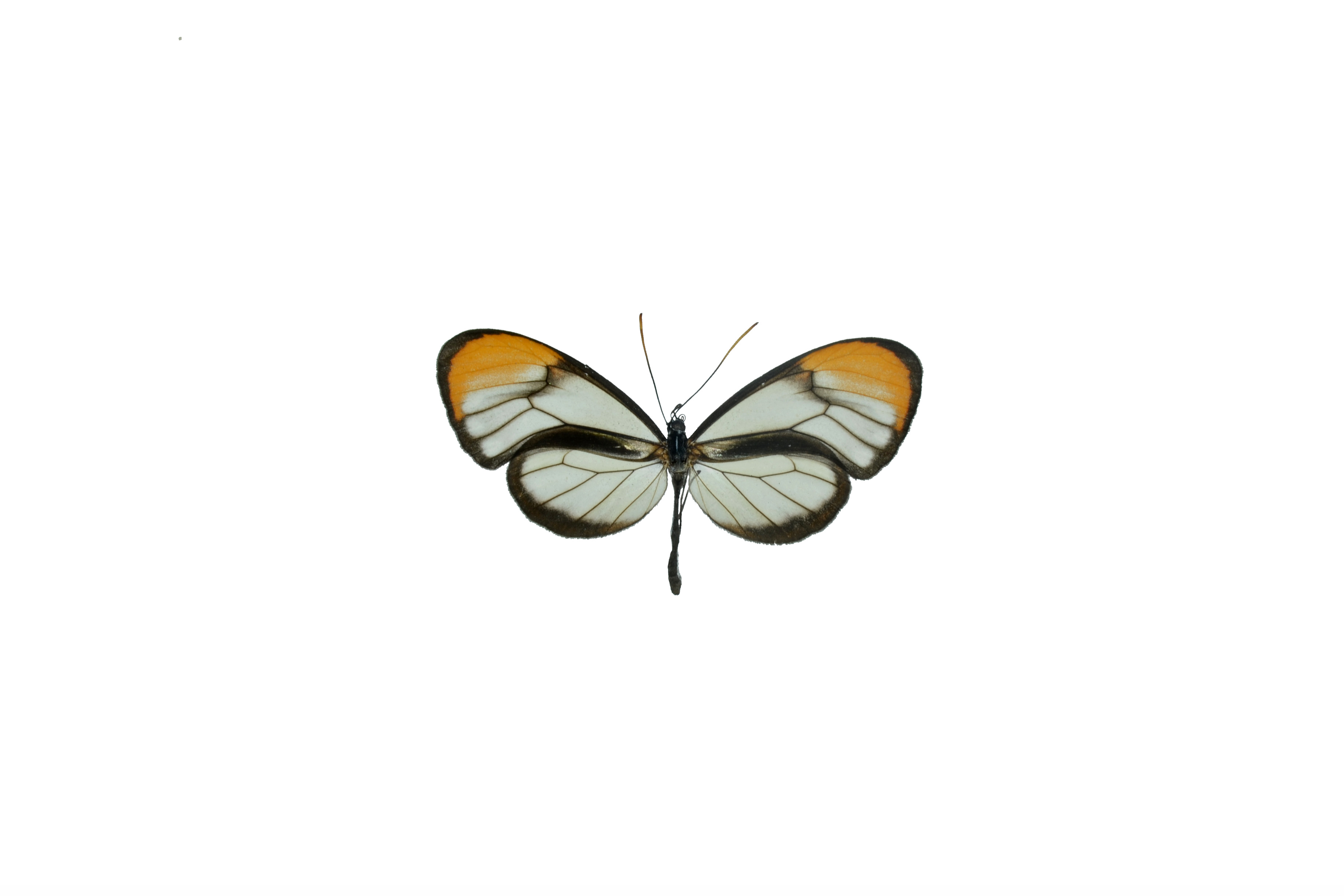
- Brevioleria arzalia

Scientific classification
- Kingdom: Animalia
- Phylum: Arthropoda
- Clade: Pancrustacea
- Class: Insecta
- Order: Lepidoptera
- Family: Nymphalidae
- Tribe: Ithomiini
- Genus: Brevioleria; Lamas, 2004

Species
- See text

= Brevioleria =

Genus of brush-footed butterflies

Brevioleria is a genus of clearwing (ithomiine) butterflies, named by Lamas in 2004. They are in the brush-footed butterfly family, Nymphalidae.

== Species ==
Arranged alphabetically:

- Brevioleria aelia (Hewitson, 1852)
- Brevioleria arzalia (Hewitson, 1876)
- Brevioleria coenina (Hewitson, 1869)
- Brevioleria seba (Hewitson, 1872)
