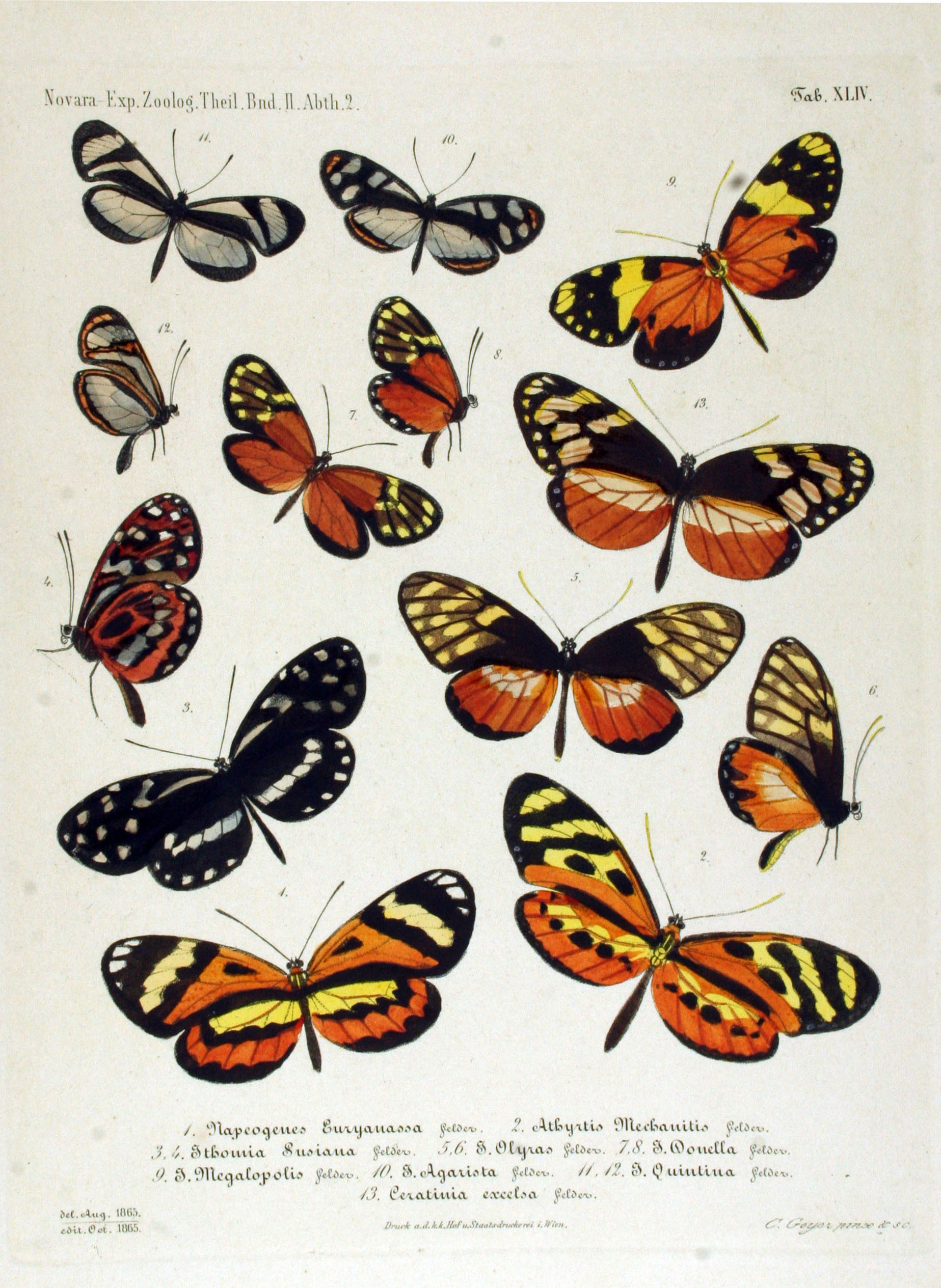
- Figure 1

Scientific classification
- Kingdom: Animalia
- Phylum: Arthropoda
- Class: Insecta
- Order: Lepidoptera
- Family: Nymphalidae
- Tribe: Ithomiini
- Genus: Placidina d'Almeida, 1928
- Species: P. euryanassa

Binomial name
- Placidina euryanassa (C. & R. Felder, 1860)

Synonyms
- Placidula d'Almeida, 1922

= Placidina =

Monotypic brush-footed butterfly genus

Placidina is a genus of clearwing (ithomiine) butterflies, named by d'Almeida in 1928. They are in the brush-footed butterfly family, Nymphalidae. It is a monotypic genus, containing only Placidina euryanassa described by father-and-son entomologists Cajetan and Rudolf Felder in 1860.
