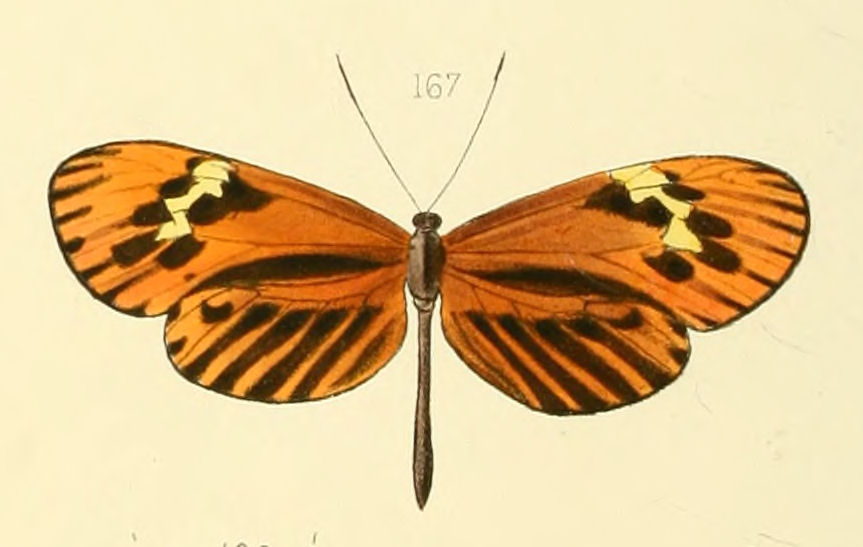
- Ithomia zitella - Illustrations of new species of exotic butterflies Ithomia XXVI

Scientific classification
- Domain: Eukaryota
- Kingdom: Animalia
- Phylum: Arthropoda
- Class: Insecta
- Order: Lepidoptera
- Family: Nymphalidae
- Subfamily: Danainae
- Tribe: Ithomiini
- Genus: Sais; Hübner, 1816

= Sais (butterfly) =

Genus of brush-footed butterflies

Sais is a Neotropical genus of clearwing (ithomiine) butterflies, named by Jacob Hübner in 1816. They are in the brush-footed butterfly family, Nymphalidae.

== Species ==
Arranged alphabetically:

- Sais browni Takahashi, 1977
- Sais rosalia (Cramer, [1779])
