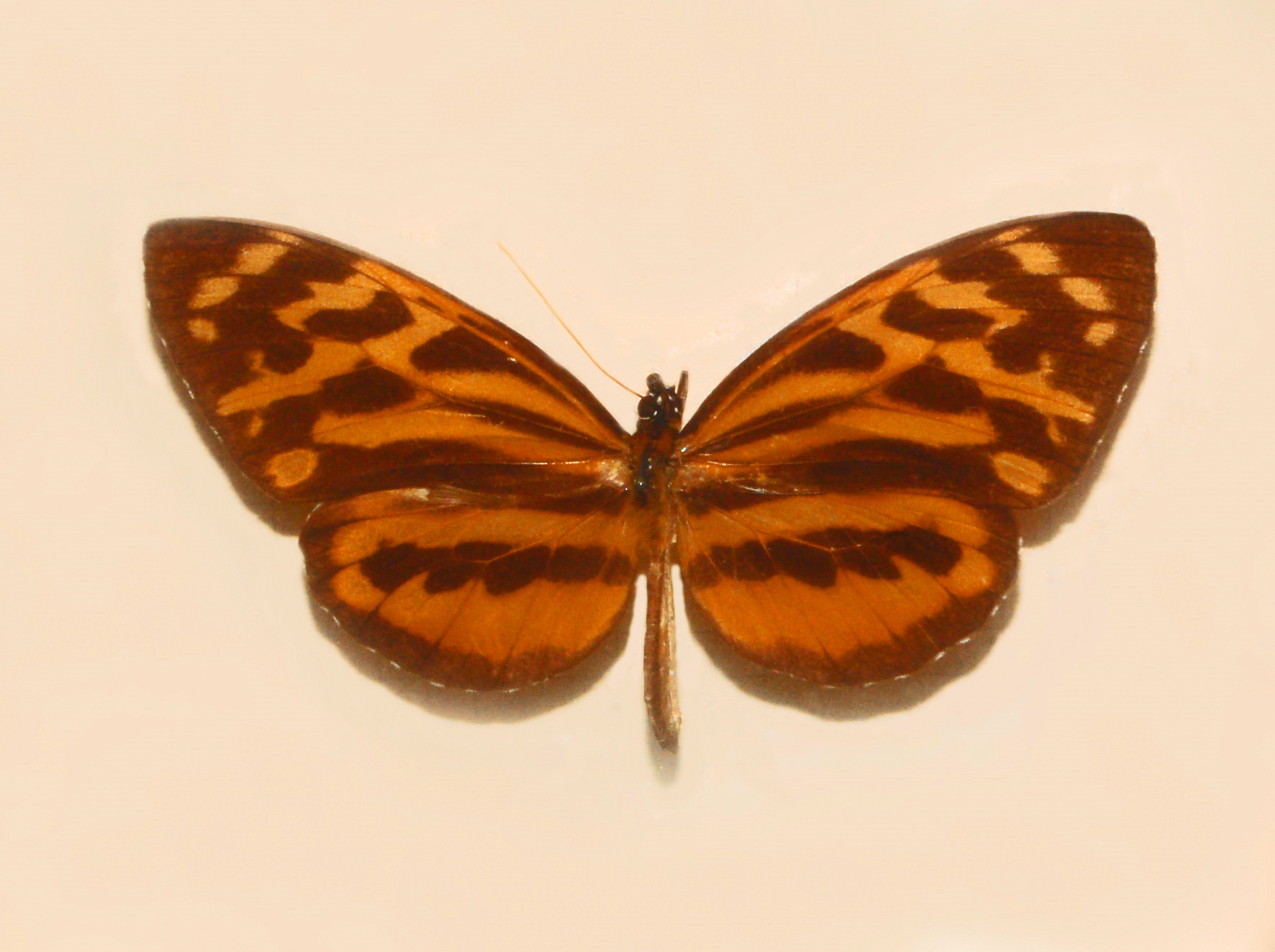
- T. harmonia hermias

Scientific classification
- Domain: Eukaryota
- Kingdom: Animalia
- Phylum: Arthropoda
- Class: Insecta
- Order: Lepidoptera
- Family: Nymphalidae
- Tribe: Ithomiini
- Genus: Tithorea; Doubleday, 1847

Synonyms
- Hirsutis Haensch, 1909

= Tithorea (butterfly) =

Genus of brush-footed butterflies

Tithorea is a Neotropical genus of butterflies belonging to the family Nymphalidae. The genus was erected by Henry Doubleday in 1847.

== List of species ==
- Tithorea harmonia (Cramer, [1777]) – Harmonia tiger or Harmonia tiger-wing
- Tithorea pacifica Willmott & Lamas, 2004
- Tithorea tarricina Hewitson, 1858 – tarricina longwing or cream-spotted tigerwing
