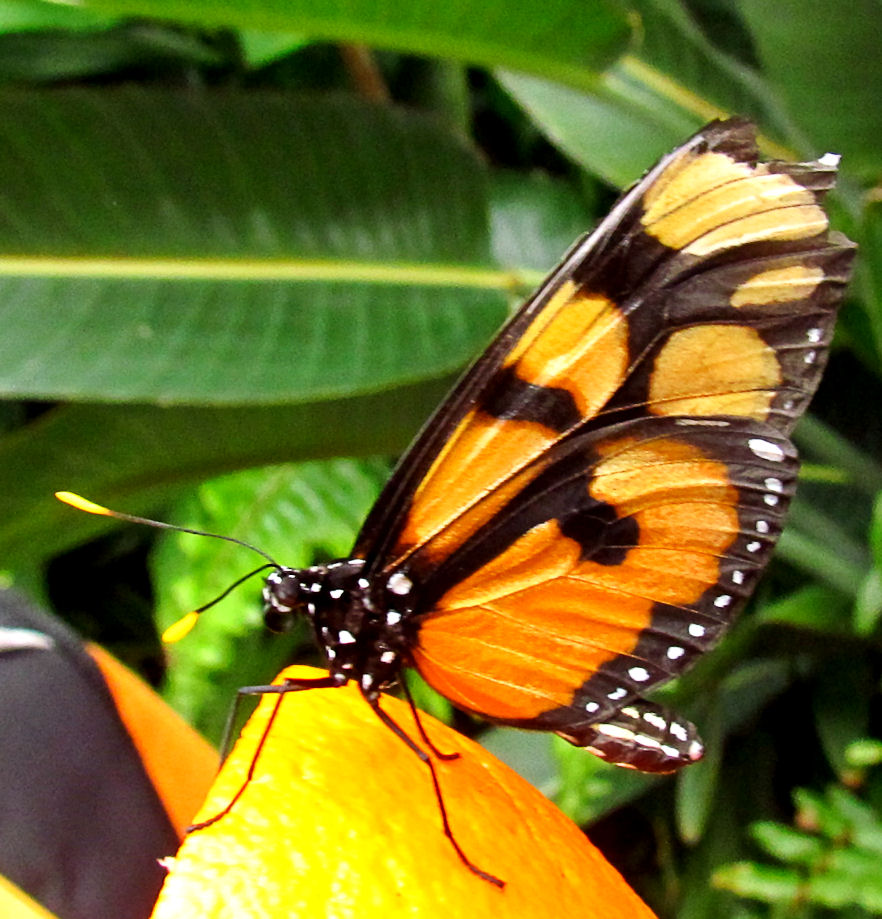

Scientific classification
- Domain: Eukaryota
- Kingdom: Animalia
- Phylum: Arthropoda
- Class: Insecta
- Order: Lepidoptera
- Family: Nymphalidae
- Tribe: Ithomiini
- Genus: Thyridia; Hübner, 1816
- Species: T. psidii

Binomial name
- Thyridia psidii (Linnaeus, 1758)

Subspecies
- See text

Synonyms
- Genus: Xanthocleis Boisduval, 1870; Aprotopus Kirby, 1871; Aprotopos Kirby, 1871; Species: Papilio psidii Linnaeus, 1758; Xanthocleis psidii Lewis, 1974; Thyridia psidii Lamas, 1999

= Thyridia =

Monotypic brush-footed butterfly genus

Thyridia is a monotypic genus of clearwing (ithomiine) butterflies, named by Jacob Hübner in 1816. Its only species is Thyridia psidii, the Melantho tigerwing or clapping ticlear. It is in the brush-footed butterfly family, Nymphalidae and is found in the Neotropical zone.

== Subspecies ==
Arranged alphabetically:

- Thyridia psidii aedesia Doubleday, [1847]
- Thyridia psidii cetoides (Rosenberg & Talbot, 1914)
- Thyridia psidii hippodamia (Fabricius, 1775)
- Thyridia psidii ino C. & R. Felder, 1862
- Thyridia psidii melantho Bates, 1866
- Thyridia psidii pallida Godman & Salvin, 1898
- Thyridia psidii psidii (Linnaeus, 1758)
