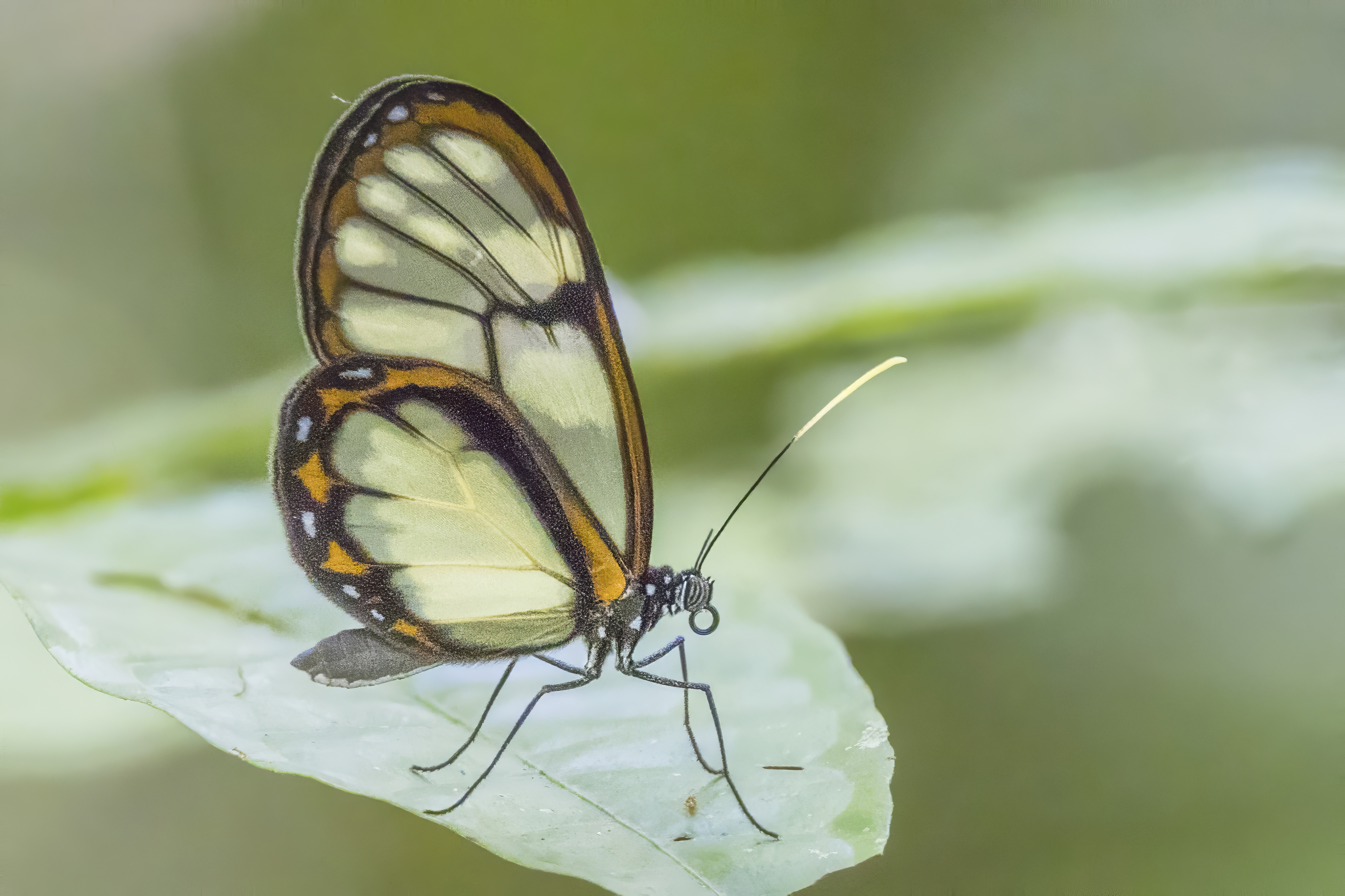
- in Ecuador

Scientific classification
- Domain: Eukaryota
- Kingdom: Animalia
- Phylum: Arthropoda
- Class: Insecta
- Order: Lepidoptera
- Family: Nymphalidae
- Tribe: Ithomiini
- Genus: Pteronymia; Butler & H. Druce, 1872

Synonyms
- Pteronymia Butler & H. Druce, 1872; Ernicornis Capronnier, 1874; Parapteronymia Kremky, 1925; Talamancana Haber, Brown & Freitas, 1994

= Pteronymia =

Genus of brush-footed butterflies

Pteronymia is a genus of clearwing (ithomiine) butterflies, named by Arthur Gardiner Butler and Herbert Druce in 1872. They are in the brush-footed butterfly family, Nymphalidae.

== Species ==
Arranged alphabetically:

- Pteronymia alcmena (Godman & Salvin, 1877)
- Pteronymia aletta (Hewitson, 1855)
- Pteronymia alida (Hewitson, 1855)
- Pteronymia alissa (Hewitson, 1869)
- Pteronymia artena (Hewitson, 1855)
- Pteronymia calgiria Schaus, 1902
- Pteronymia cotytto (Guérin-Méneville, [1844])
- Pteronymia dispaena (Hewitson, 1876)
- Pteronymia donella (C. Felder & R. Felder, [1865])
- Pteronymia euritea (Cramer, [1780])
- Pteronymia forsteri Baumann, 1985
- Pteronymia fulvimargo Butler & H. Druce, 1872
- Pteronymia fumida Schaus, 1913
- Pteronymia gertschi Fox, 1945
- Pteronymia glauca Haensch, 1903
- Pteronymia granica (Hewitson, 1877)
- Pteronymia hara (Hewitson, 1877)
- Pteronymia latilla (Hewitson, 1855)
- Pteronymia laura (Staudinger, 1885)
- Pteronymia linzera (Herrich-Schäffer, 1864)
- Pteronymia lonera (Butler & H. Druce, 1872)
- Pteronymia medellina Haensch, 1905
- Pteronymia nubivaga Fox, 1947
- Pteronymia obscuratus (Fabricius, 1793)
- Pteronymia olimba Haensch, 1905
- Pteronymia oneida (Hewitson, 1855)
- Pteronymia ozia (Hewitson, 1870)
- Pteronymia parva (Salvin, 1869)
- Pteronymia picta (Salvin, 1869)
- Pteronymia primula (Bates, 1862)
- Pteronymia rufocincta (Salvin, 1869)
- Pteronymia sao (Hübner, [1813])
- Pteronymia semonis Haensch, 1909
- Pteronymia serrata Haensch, 1903
- Pteronymia simplex (Salvin, 1869)
- Pteronymia sylvo (Geyer, 1832)
- Pteronymia tamina Haensch, 1909
- Pteronymia teresita (Hewitson, 1863)
- Pteronymia ticida (Hewitson, 1869)
- Pteronymia tucuna (Bates, 1862)
- Pteronymia veia (Hewitson, 1853)
- Pteronymia vestilla (Hewitson, 1853)

== See also ==
- Nymphalidae - Brush-footed Butterflies
