= Hyalenna =

Scientific classification
- Kingdom: Animalia
- Phylum: Arthropoda
- Clade: Pancrustacea
- Class: Insecta
- Order: Lepidoptera
- Family: Nymphalidae
- Tribe: Ithomiini
- Genus: Hyalenna; Forbes, 1942

Species
- See text

Genus of brush-footed butterflies

Hyalenna is a genus of clearwing (ithomiine) butterflies described by William Trowbridge Merrifield Forbes in 1942. They are in the brush-footed butterfly family, Nymphalidae.

== Species ==
Arranged alphabetically:

- Hyalenna alidella (Hewitson, 1869)
- Hyalenna buckleyi Lamas & Willmott, 2005
- Hyalenna paradoxa (Staudinger, [1884])
- Hyalenna pascua (Schaus, 1902)
- Hyalenna perasippe (Hewitson, 1877)
- Hyalenna sulmona (Hewitson, 1877)
