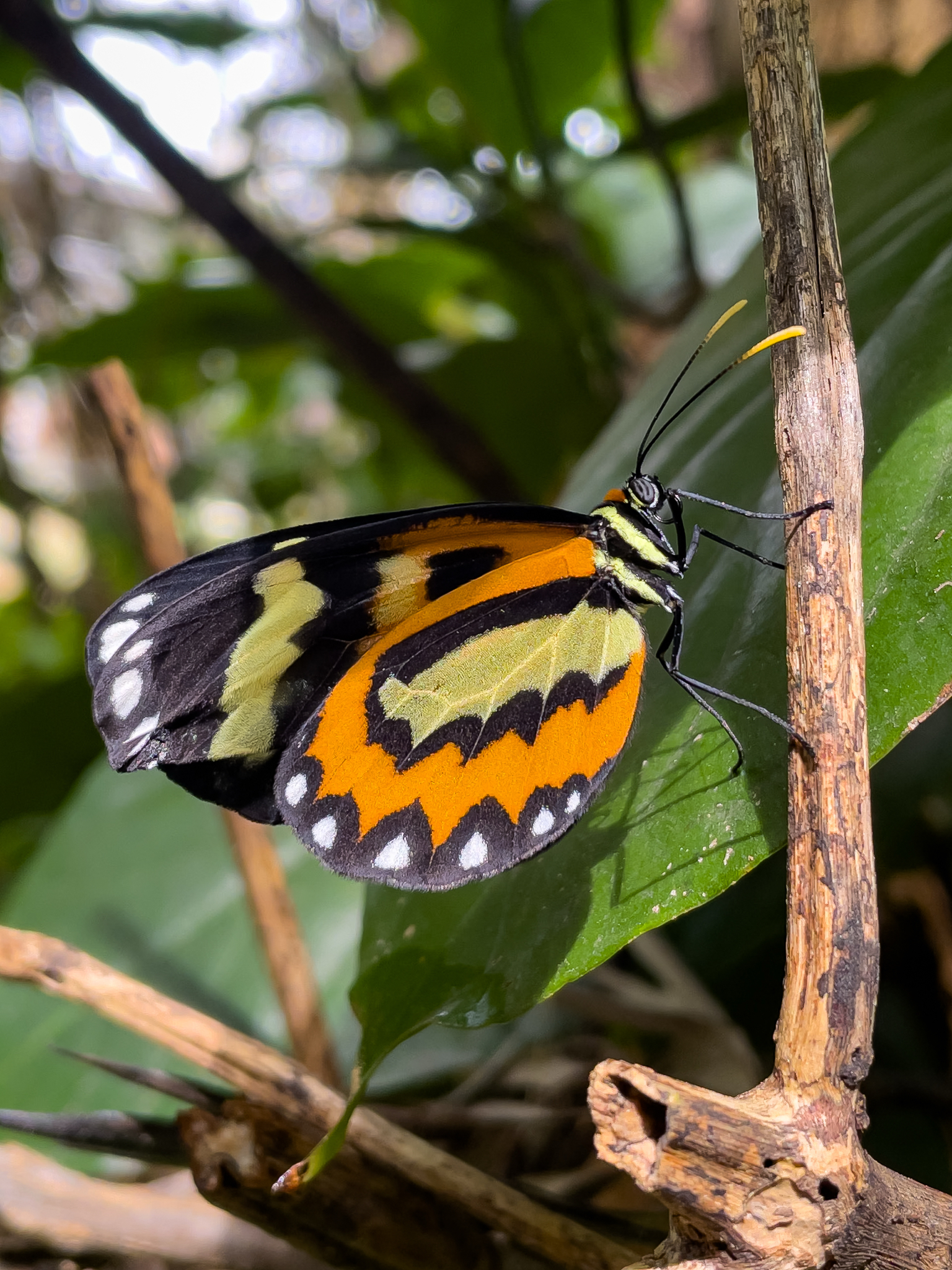

Scientific classification
- Kingdom: Animalia
- Phylum: Arthropoda
- Clade: Pancrustacea
- Class: Insecta
- Order: Lepidoptera
- Family: Nymphalidae
- Tribe: Ithomiini
- Genus: Pagyris; Boisduval, 1870

Species
- See text

Synonyms
- Miraleria Haensch, 1903

= Pagyris =

Genus of brush-footed butterflies

Pagyris is a genus of clearwing (ithomiine) butterflies, named by Jean Baptiste Boisduval in 1870. They are in the brush-footed butterfly family, Nymphalidae.

== Species ==
Arranged alphabetically:

- Pagyris cymothoe (Hewitson, 1855)
- Pagyris priscilla Lamas, 1986
- Pagyris renelichyi (Neild, 2008)
- Pagyris ulla (Hewitson, 1857)
