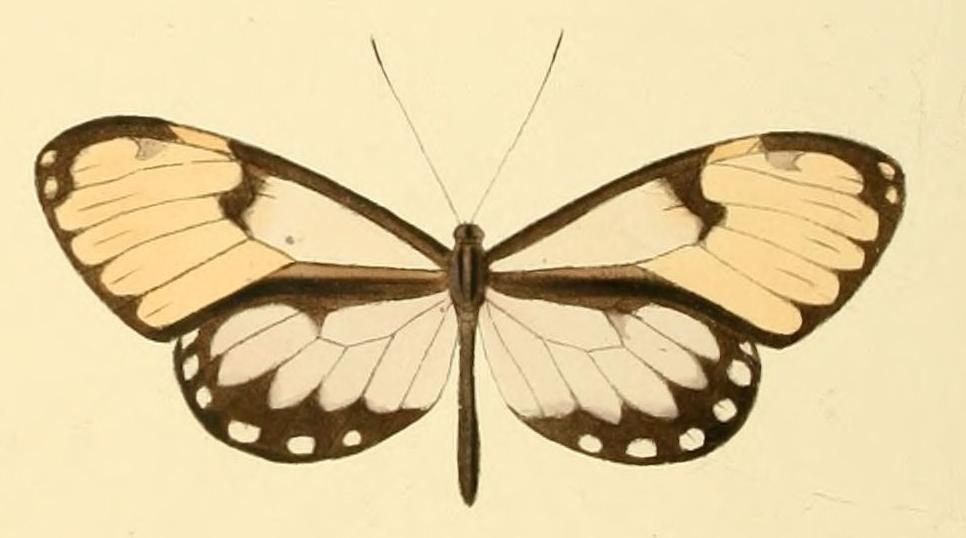

Scientific classification
- Kingdom: Animalia
- Phylum: Arthropoda
- Class: Insecta
- Order: Lepidoptera
- Family: Nymphalidae
- Tribe: Ithomiini
- Genus: Veladyris; Fox, 1945
- Species: V. pardalis

Binomial name
- Veladyris pardalis (Salvin, 1869)

Synonyms
- Ithomia pardalis Salvin, 1869; Ithomia cytharista Hewitson, 1874; Velamysta pardalis totumbra Kaye, 1919

= Veladyris =

Monotypic brush-footed butterfly genus

Veladyris is a genus of clearwing (ithomiine) butterflies, named by Fox in 1945. They are in the brush-footed butterfly family, Nymphalidae. It contains only one species, Veladyris pardalis, which is found in Ecuador and Peru.

== Subspecies ==
- V. p. pardalis (Ecuador)
- V. p. aurea Lamas, 1980 (Ecuador)
- V. p. christina Lamas, 1980 (Peru)
- V. p. cytharista (Hewitson, 1874) (Peru)
- V. p. totumbra (Kaye, 1919) (Peru)

There is one more undescribed subspecies from Peru.
