= Heterosais =

- Heterosais

Scientific classification
- Kingdom: Animalia
- Phylum: Arthropoda
- Clade: Pancrustacea
- Class: Insecta
- Order: Lepidoptera
- Family: Nymphalidae
- Tribe: Ithomiini
- Genus: Heterosais; Godman & Salvin, [1880]

Species
- See text

Synonyms
- Rhadinoptera d'Almeida, 1922

Genus of brush-footed butterflies

Heterosais is a genus of clearwing (ithomiine) butterflies, named by Frederick DuCane Godman and Osbert Salvin in 1880. They are in the brush-footed butterfly family, Nymphalidae.

== Species ==
Arranged alphabetically:

- Heterosais edessa (Hewitson, 1855)
- Heterosais giulia (Hewitson, 1855)
