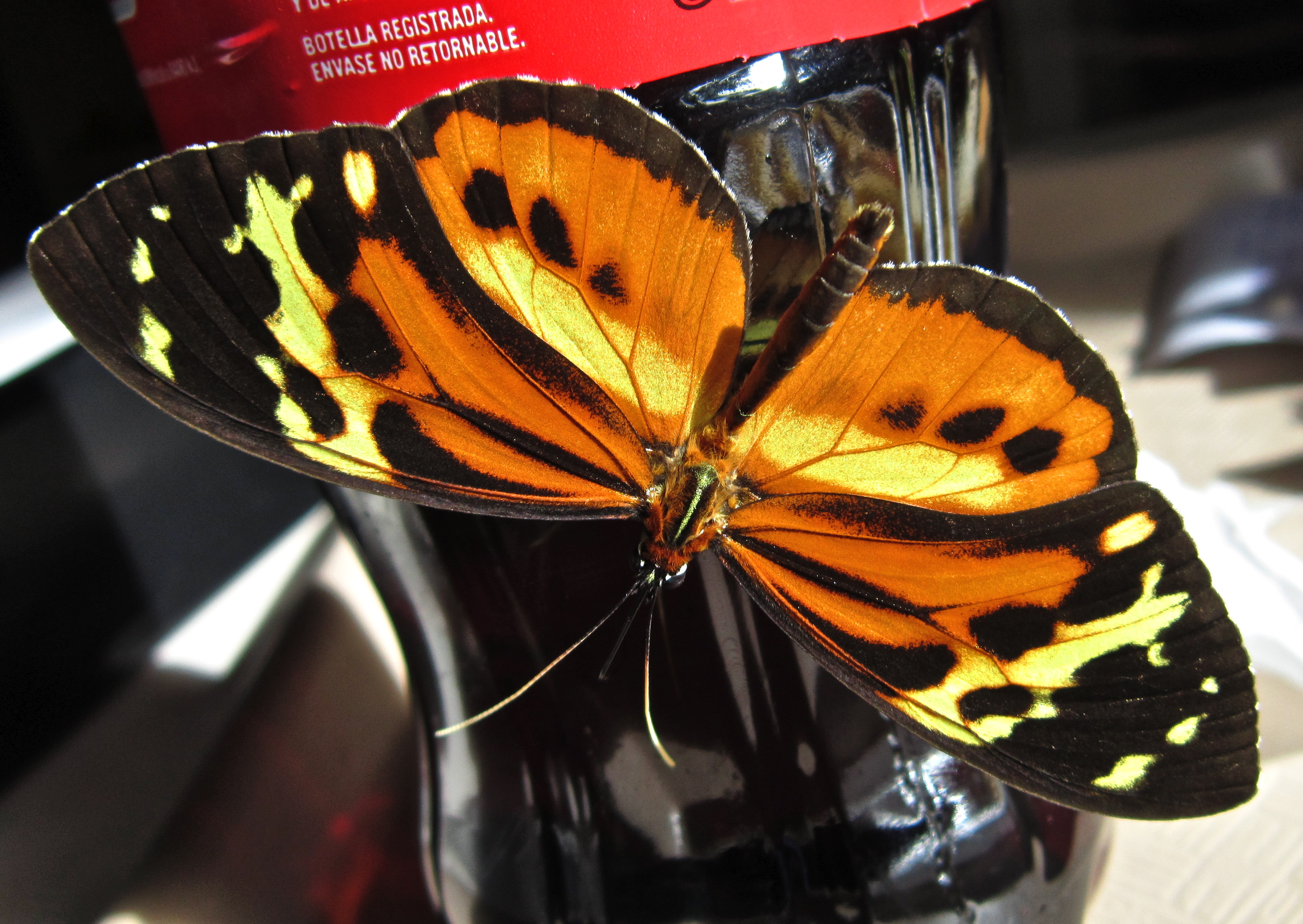

Scientific classification
- Kingdom: Animalia
- Phylum: Arthropoda
- Class: Insecta
- Order: Lepidoptera
- Family: Nymphalidae
- Genus: Tithorea
- Species: T. harmonia

Binomial name
- Tithorea harmonia (Cramer, 1777)

Synonyms
- Papilio harmonia Cramer, 1777; Tithorea harmonia f. moppa Bryk, 1937; Tithorea harmonia deltana Fox, 1956; Papilio irene Drury, 1782; Tithorea umbratilis Bates, 1866; Heliconia megara Godart, [1819]; Tithorea flavescens Kirby, 1889; Tithorea egaensis Butler, 1873; Tithorea pseudethra Butler, 1873; Tithorea neitha Hopffer, 1874; Tithorea neitha Hopffer, 1879; Tithorea helicaon Godman & Salvin, [1879]; Tithorea hippothous Godman & Salvin, [1879]; Tithorea furea var. salvadoris Staudinger, 1885; Tithorea tyro Doubleday, 1847; Hirsutis pseudonyma mira Neustetter, 1929; Tithorea hermias hermina ab. napona Haensch, 1903; Tithorea assimilis Haensch, 1905

= Tithorea harmonia =

Species of butterfly

Tithorea harmonia, the Harmonia tiger-wing or Harmonia tiger, is a species of butterfly belonging to the family Nymphalidae.

== Description ==
Tithorea harmonia has a wingspan reaching about 70 millimetres (2.8 in). This toxic "tiger" butterfly has the usual pattern of black wings with bright orange bands. The forewings have a black tip. Also the antennae are orange. Larvae feed on Prestonia species.

== Distribution ==
This widespread species can be found from Mexico to South America.

== Subspecies ==
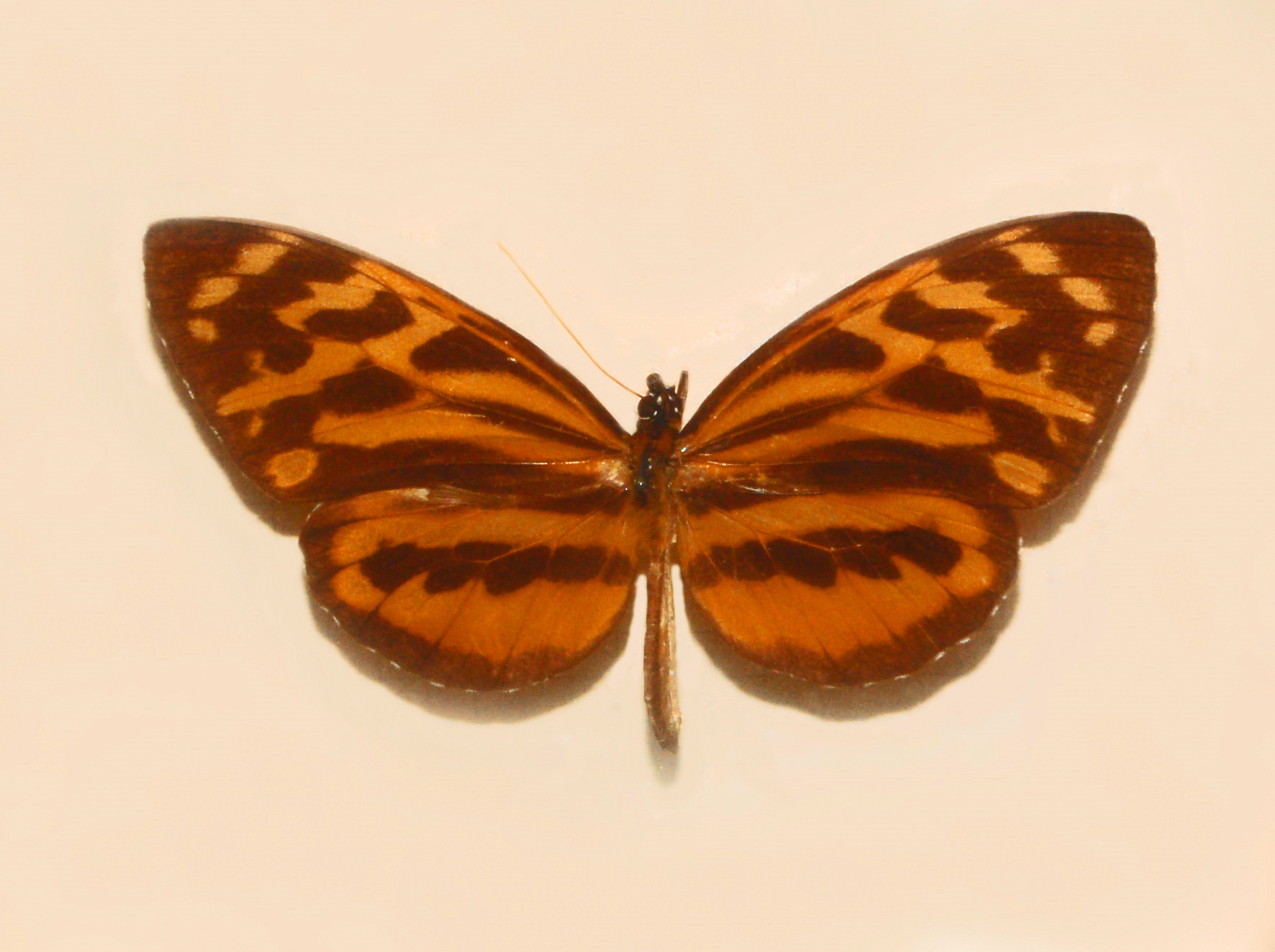
T. h. hermias

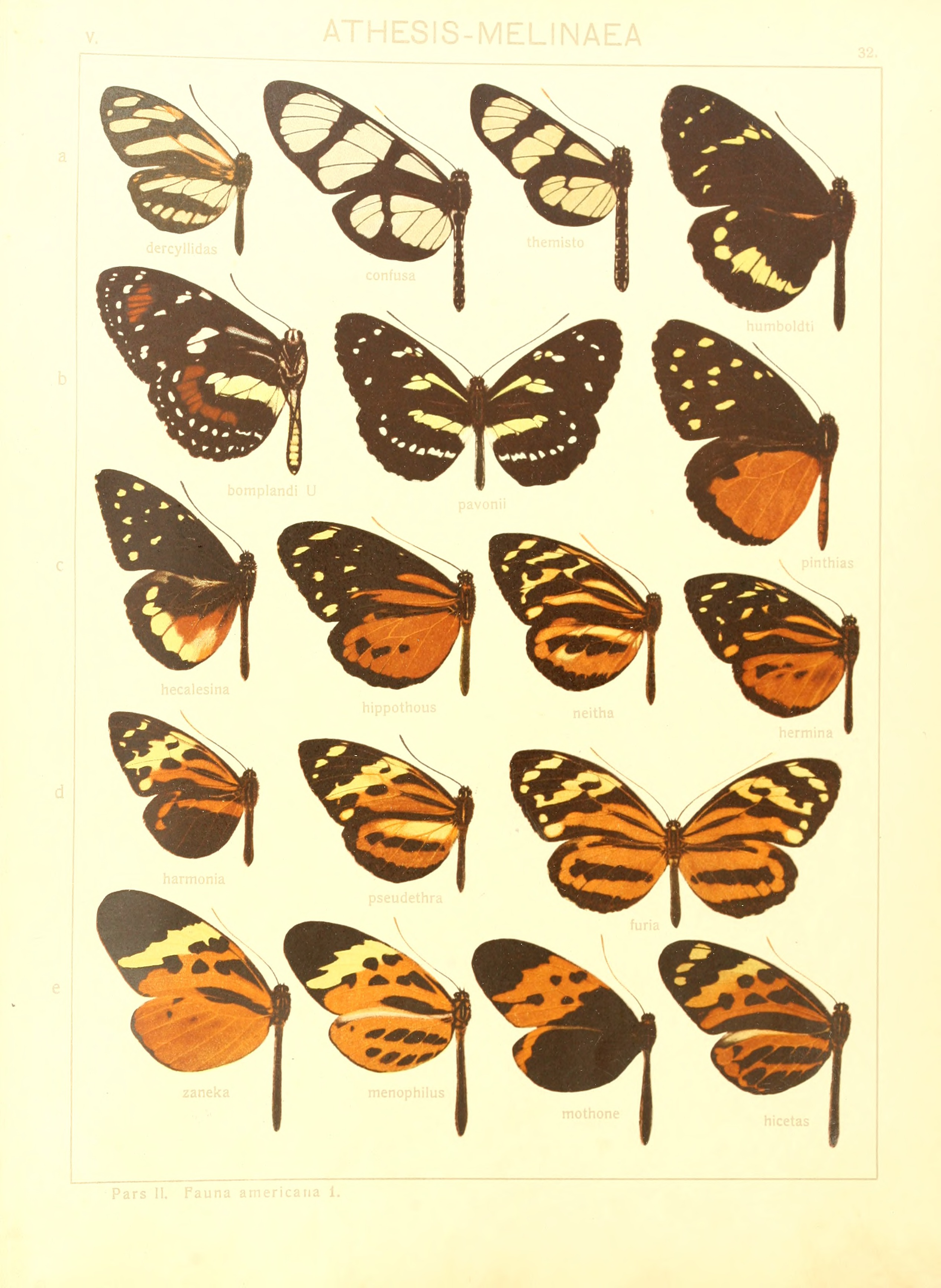
Tithorea harmonia in Adalbert Seitz

Listed alphabetically:

- T. h. brunnea Haensch, 1905 (Peru)
- T. h. caissara (Zikán, 1941) (Brazil)
- T. h. cuparina Bates, 1862 (Brazil)
- T. h. dorada Brown, 1977 (Venezuela)
- T. h. egaensis Butler, 1873 (Brazil)
- T. h. flacilla Godman & Salvin, 1898 (Colombia)
- T. h. furia Staudinger, 1884 (Ecuador - Venezuela)
- T. h. furina Godman & Salvin, 1898 (Colombia)
- T. h. gilberti Brown, 1977 (Peru)
- T. h. harmonia (Surinam, Venezuela, French Guiana)
- T. h. helicaon Godman & Salvin, 1879 (Nicaragua - Panama, Costa Rica)
- T. h. hermias Godman & Salvin, 1898 (Ecuador, Amazon)
- T. h. hermina Haensch, 1903 (Ecuador)
- T. h. hippothous Godman & Salvin, 1879 (Guatemala)
- T. h. irene (Drury, 1782) (Panama)
- T. h. lateflava (Haensch, 1909) (Bolivia)
- T. h. manabiana Fox, 1956 (Ecuador)
- T. h. martina Fox, 1956 (Peru)
- T. h. megara (Godart, 1819) (Trinidad)
- T. h. melanina Haensch, 1905 (Peru)
- T. h. neitha Hopffer, 1874 (Peru)
- T. h. pseudethra Butler, 1873 (Brazil)
- T. h. pseudonyma Staudinger, 1894 (Bolivia)
- T. h. salvadoris Staudinger, 1885 (El Salvador)
- T. h. sulphurata (Zikán, 1941) (Brazil)
