= Mcclungia =

- Mcclungia cymo is seen top right

Scientific classification
- Kingdom: Animalia
- Phylum: Arthropoda
- Clade: Pancrustacea
- Class: Insecta
- Order: Lepidoptera
- Family: Nymphalidae
- Tribe: Ithomiini
- Genus: Mcclungia; Fox, 1940
- Species: M. cymo

Binomial name
- Mcclungia cymo (Hübner, [1806])

Monotypic brush-footed butterfly genus

Mcclungia is a genus of clearwing (ithomiine) butterflies, named by Fox in 1940. They are in the brush-footed butterfly family, Nymphalidae. The genus is monotypic, containing only Mcclungia cymo named by Jacob Hübner in 1806.
