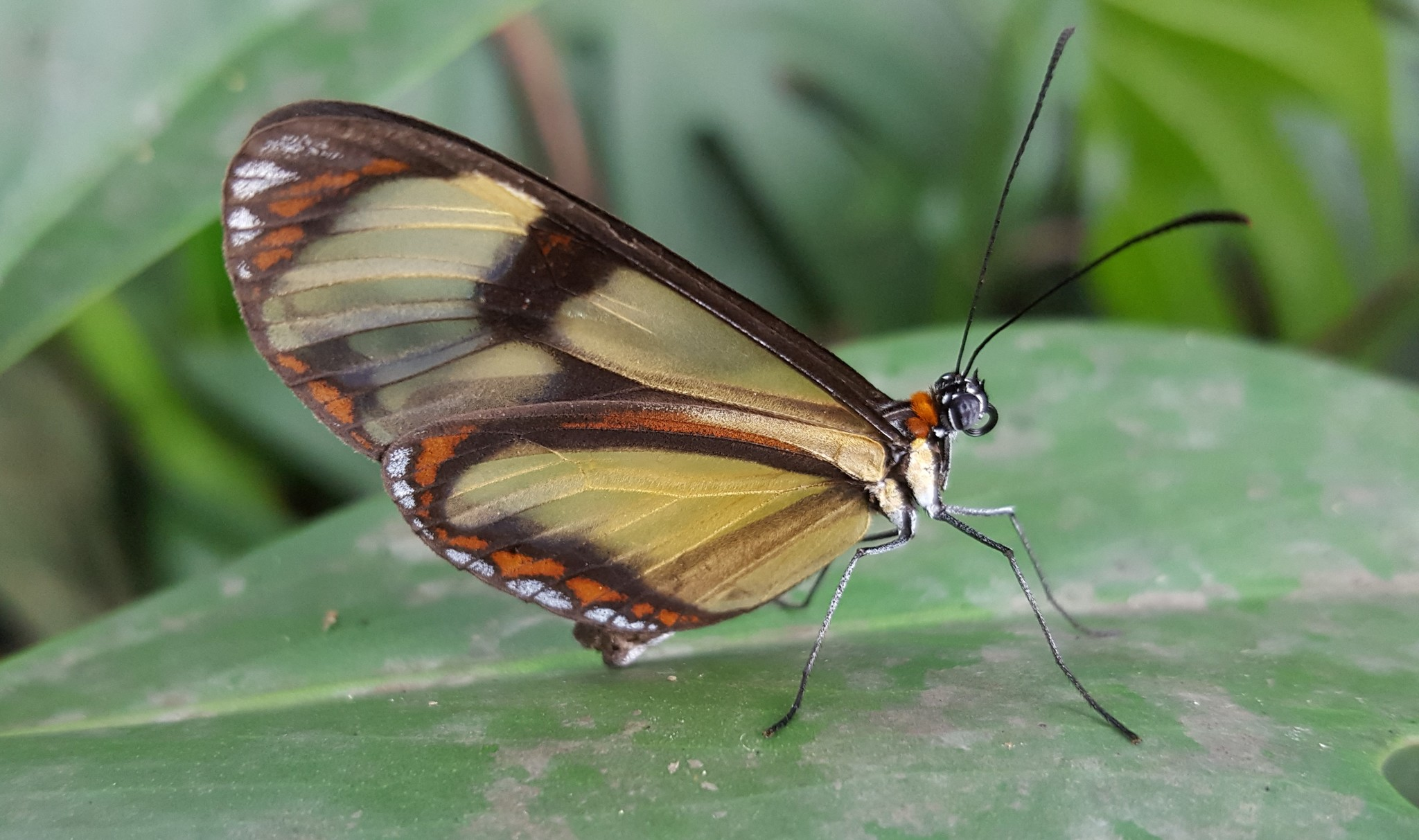
- Epityches eupompe

Scientific classification
- Domain: Eukaryota
- Kingdom: Animalia
- Phylum: Arthropoda
- Class: Insecta
- Order: Lepidoptera
- Family: Nymphalidae
- Subfamily: Danainae
- Tribe: Ithomiini
- Genus: Epityches d'Almeida, 1938
- Species: E. eupompe

Binomial name
- Epityches eupompe (Geyer, 1832)

Synonyms
- Tritonia Geyer, 1832

= Epityches =

Monotypic brush-footed butterfly genus

Epityches is a monotypic genus of clearwing (ithomiine) butterflies, named by d'Almeida in 1938. They are in the brush-footed butterfly family, Nymphalidae. Its sole species is Epityches eupompe.
