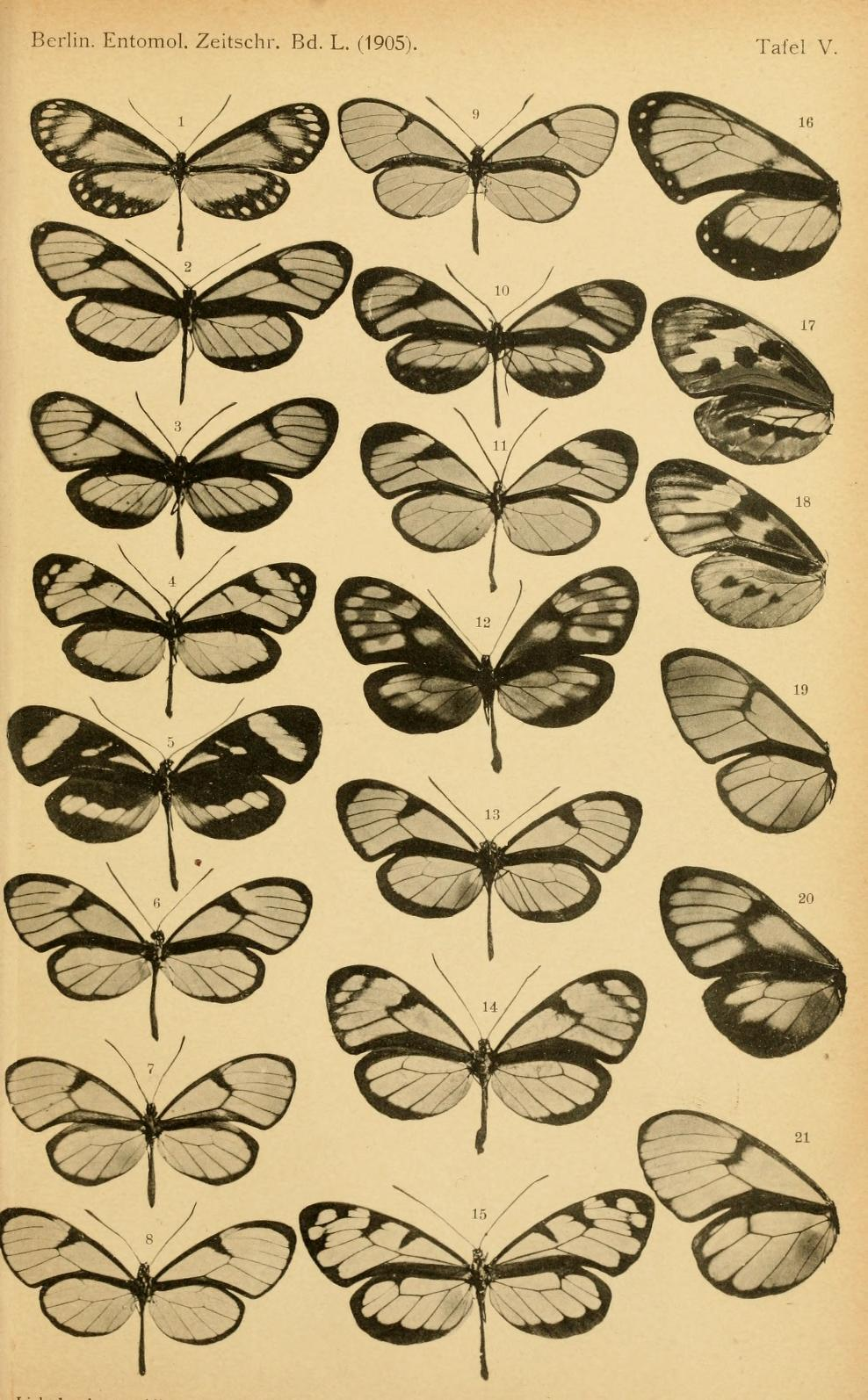
- Figure 8

Scientific classification
- Kingdom: Animalia
- Phylum: Arthropoda
- Class: Insecta
- Order: Lepidoptera
- Family: Nymphalidae
- Tribe: Ithomiini
- Genus: Haenschia; Lamas, 2004

Species
- See text

= Haenschia =

Genus of brush-footed butterflies

Haenschia is a genus of clearwing (ithomiine) butterflies, named by Lamas in 2004. They are in the brush-footed butterfly family, Nymphalidae. The name honours German entomologist and insect dealer Richard Haensch.

== Species ==
Arranged alphabetically:

- Haenschia derama (Haensch, 1905)
- Haenschia sidonia (Haensch, 1905)
