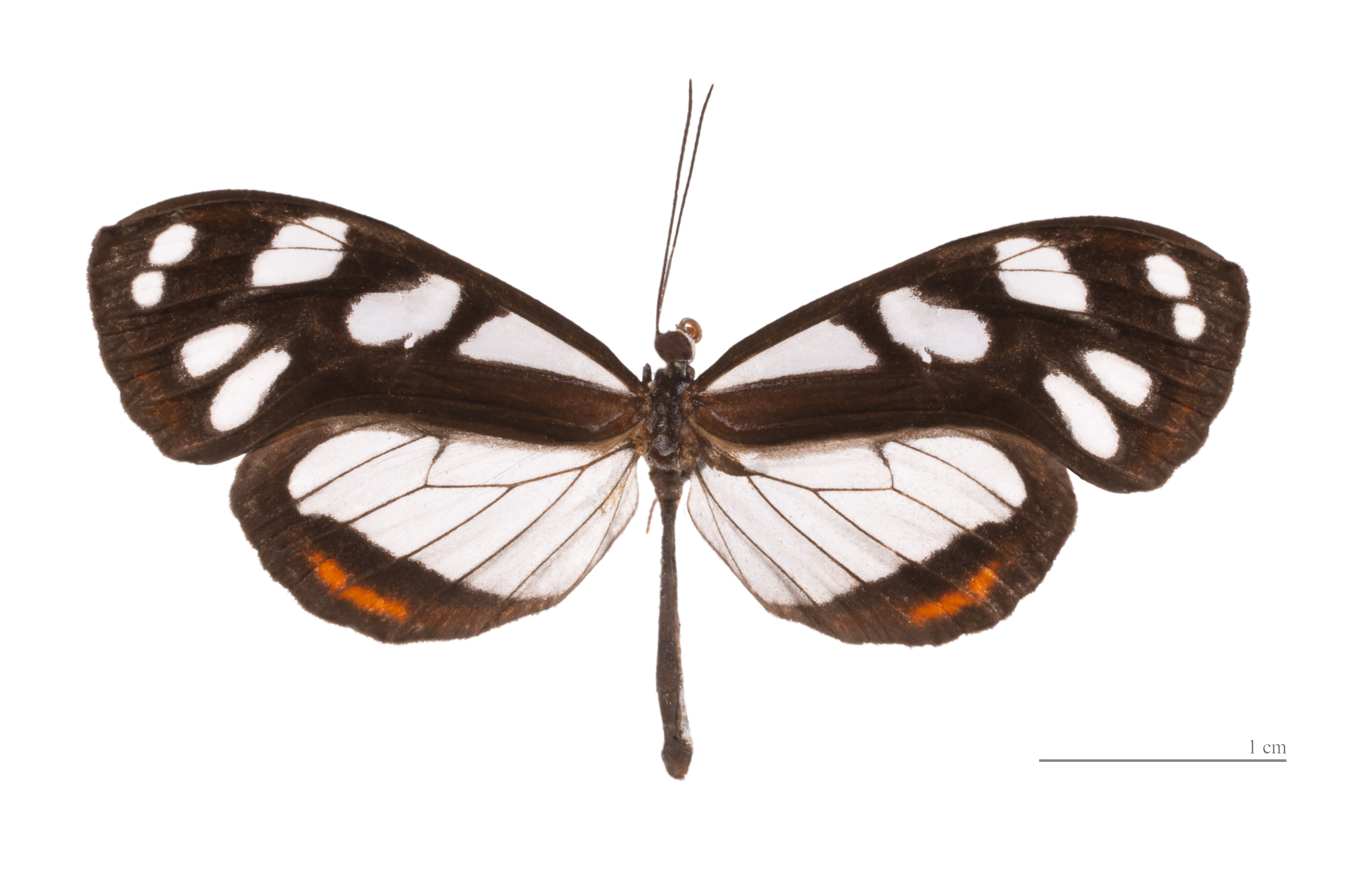
- Hyposcada illinissa

Scientific classification
- Domain: Eukaryota
- Kingdom: Animalia
- Phylum: Arthropoda
- Class: Insecta
- Order: Lepidoptera
- Family: Nymphalidae
- Tribe: Ithomiini
- Genus: Hyposcada; Godman & Salvin, [1879]

Species
- See text

= Hyposcada =

Genus of brush-footed butterflies

Hyposcada is a genus of clearwing (ithomiine) butterflies, named by Frederick DuCane Godman and Osbert Salvin in 1879. They are in the brush-footed butterfly family, Nymphalidae.

== Species ==
Arranged alphabetically:

- Hyposcada anchiala (Hewitson, 1868)
- Hyposcada attilodes Kaye, 1918
- Hyposcada illinissa (Hewitson, 1851)
- Hyposcada schausi Fox, 1941
- Hyposcada taliata (Hewitson, 1874)
- Hyposcada virginiana (Hewitson, 1856)
- Hyposcada zarepha (Hewitson, 1869)
