= Dircenna =

Scientific classification
- Kingdom: Animalia
- Phylum: Arthropoda
- Clade: Pancrustacea
- Class: Insecta
- Order: Lepidoptera
- Family: Nymphalidae
- Subfamily: Danainae
- Tribe: Ithomiini
- Subtribe: Dircennina
- Genus: Dircenna; Doubleday, 1847

Species
- See text

Genus of brush-footed butterflies

Dircenna is a genus of clearwing (ithomiine) butterflies, named by Edward Doubleday in 1847. They are in the brush-footed butterfly family, Nymphalidae. The genus comprises fairly large ithomiines with elongated forewings which are characterized by quite straight costae and distinctively shaped discal cells. They occur from Mexico to Southern Brazil. Larvae feed on plants from the family Solanaceae, such as Solanum and Brunfelsia.

== Species ==
Arranged alphabetically:

- Dircenna adina (Hewitson, 1855)
- Dircenna dero (Hübner, 1823) — Dero Clearwing
- Dircenna jemina (Geyer, [1837])
- Dircenna klugii (Geyer, 1837) — Klug's Clearwing
- Dircenna loreta Haensch, 1903
- Dircenna olyras (C. & R. Felder, [1865])

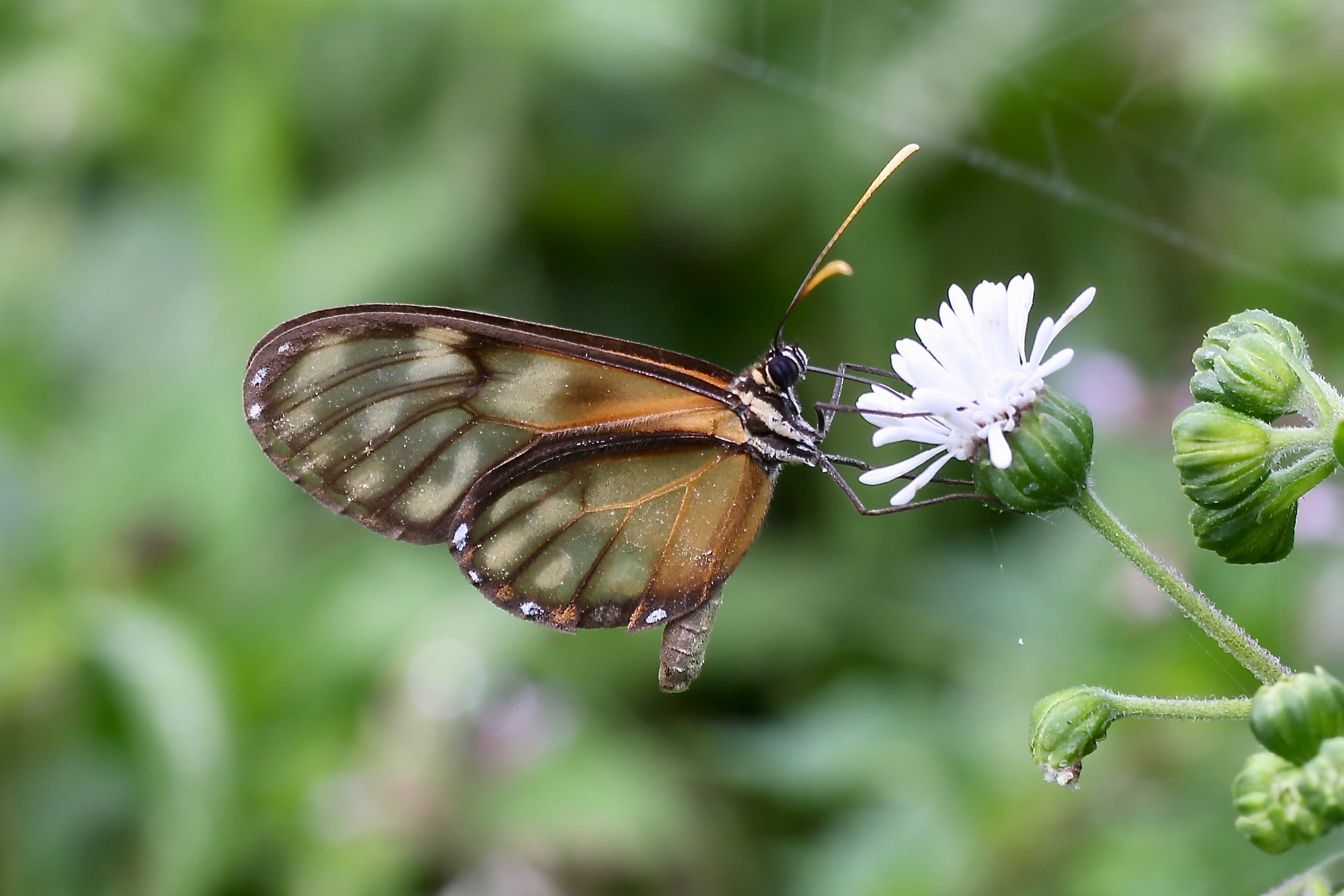
Dircenna jemina visina (male), Ecuador, Mindo

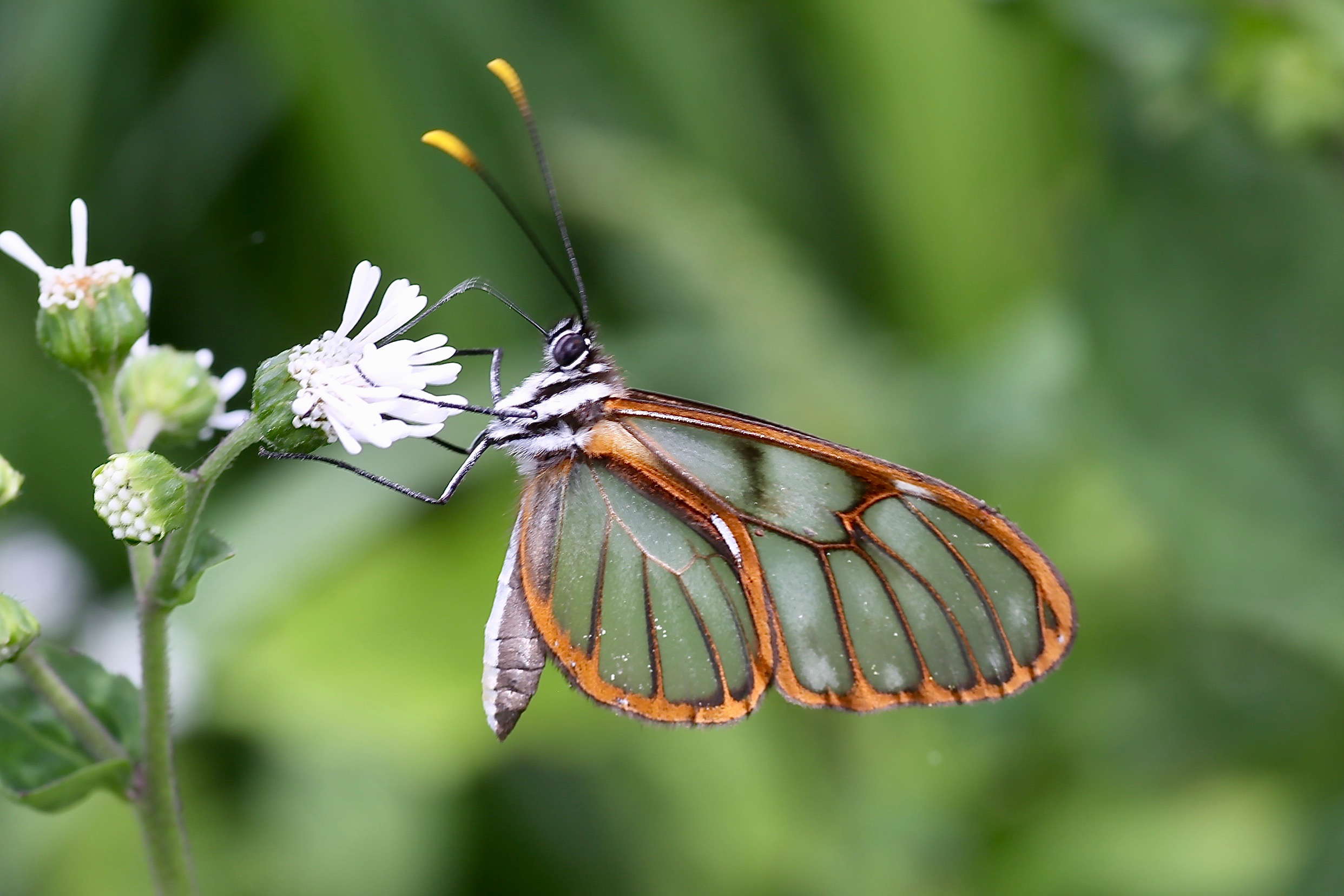
Dircenna adina suna, Ecuador, Mindo
