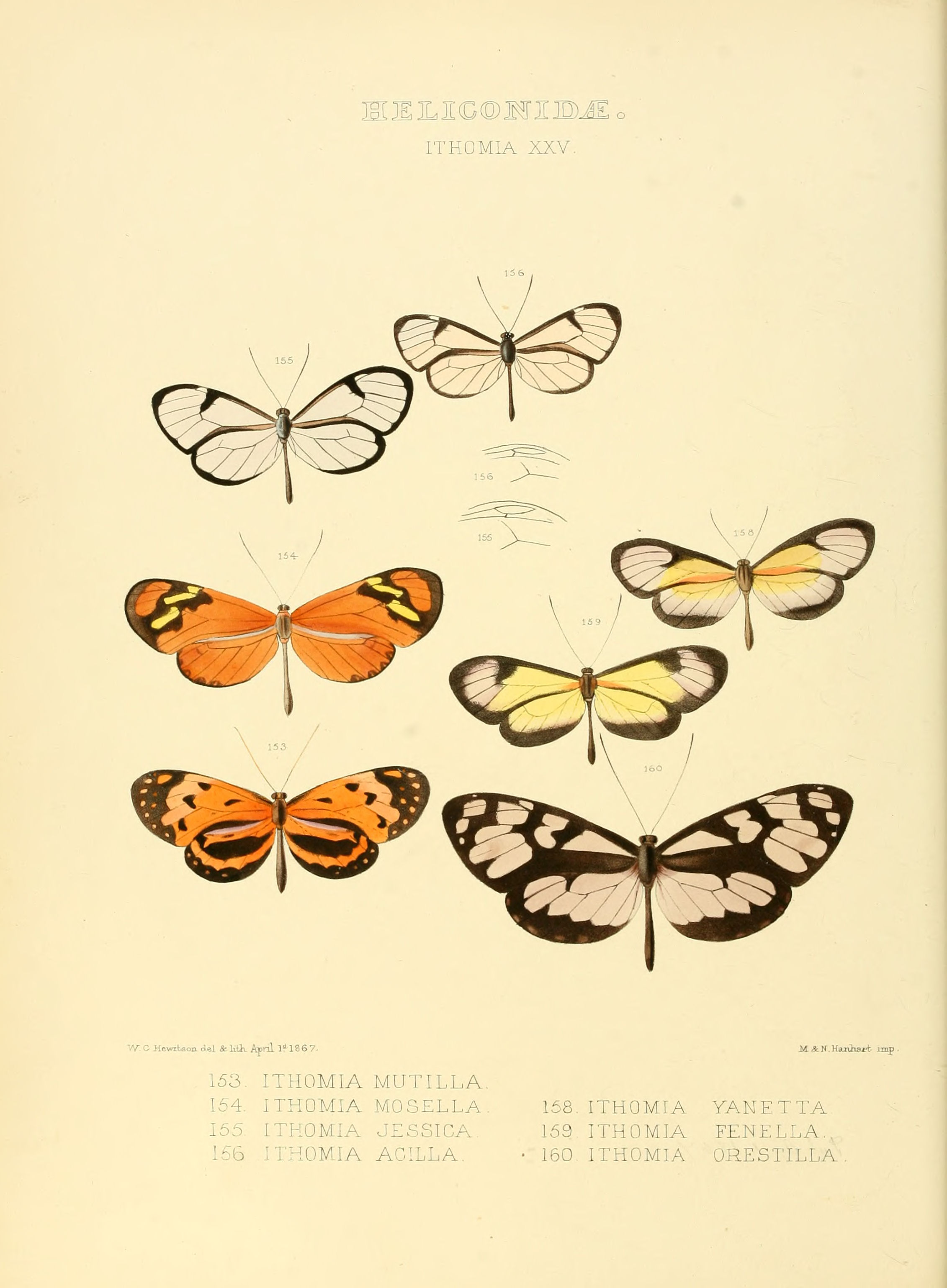
- Illustrations of new species of exotic butterflies

Scientific classification
- Kingdom: Animalia
- Phylum: Arthropoda
- Class: Insecta
- Order: Lepidoptera
- Family: Nymphalidae
- Tribe: Ithomiini
- Genus: Megoleria; Constantino, 1999

Species
- See text

= Megoleria =

Genus of brush-footed butterflies

Megoleria is a genus of clearwing (ithomiine) butterflies, named by Constantino in 1999. They are in the brush-footed butterfly family, Nymphalidae.

== Species ==
Arranged alphabetically:

- Megoleria orestilla (Hewitson, 1867)
- Megoleria susiana (C. & R. Felder, 1862)
