= Paititia =

Scientific classification
- Kingdom: Animalia
- Phylum: Arthropoda
- Class: Insecta
- Order: Lepidoptera
- Family: Nymphalidae
- Tribe: Ithomiini
- Genus: Paititia; Lamas, 1979
- Species: P. neglecta

Binomial name
- Paititia neglecta Lamas, 1979

Monotypic genus of brush-footed butterflies

Paititia is a butterfly genus in the tribe Ithomiini in the brush-footed butterfly family, Nymphalidae. The genus is monotypic, containing only Paititia neglecta.
