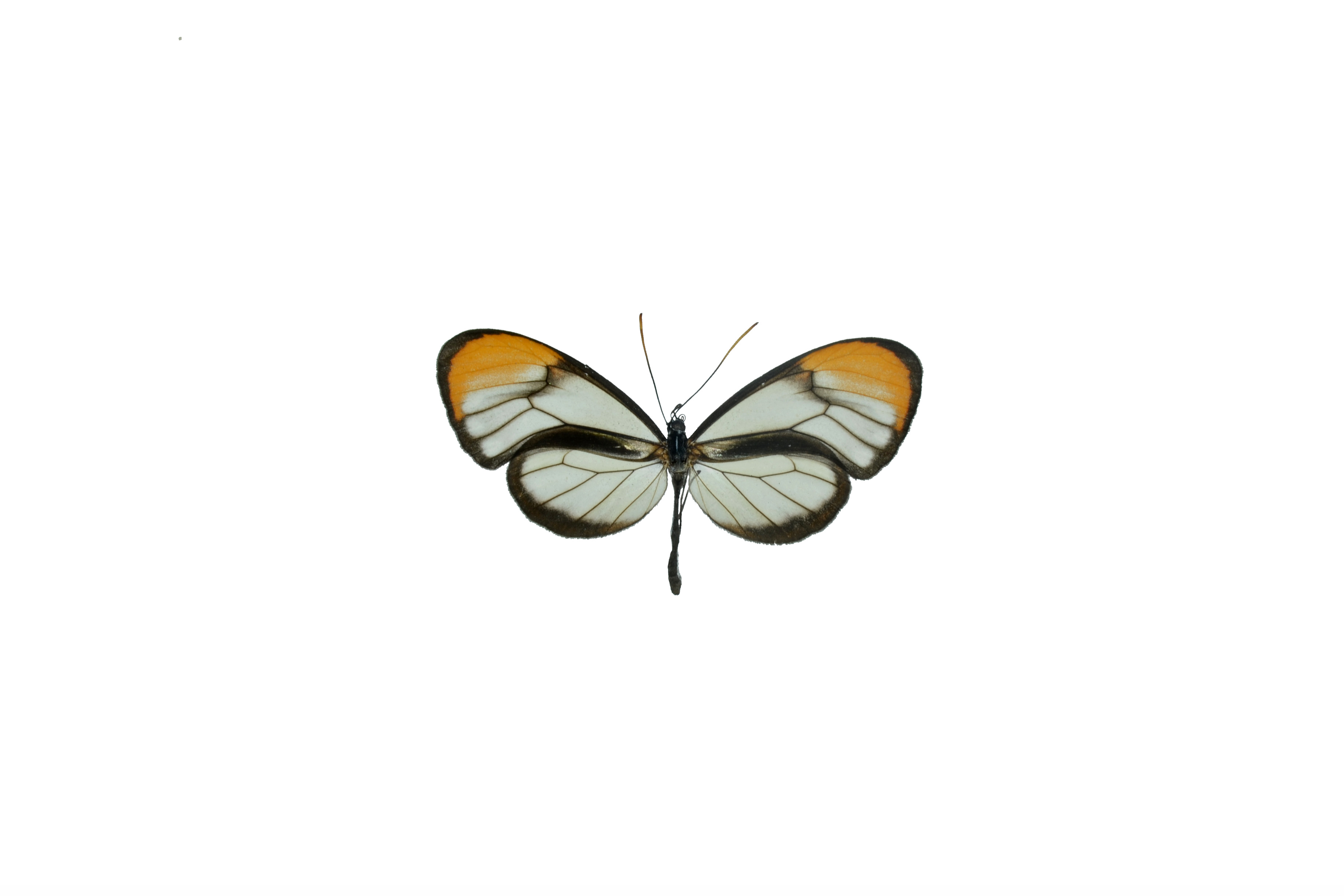

Scientific classification
- Kingdom: Animalia
- Phylum: Arthropoda
- Class: Insecta
- Order: Lepidoptera
- Family: Nymphalidae
- Genus: Brevioleria
- Species: B. arzalia

Binomial name
- Brevioleria arzalia (Hewitson, 1876)

Synonyms
- Ithomia arzalia Hewitson, 1876

= Brevioleria arzalia =

Species of butterfly

Brevioleria arzalia is a species of butterfly of the family Nymphalidae. It is found in Bolivia and Peru.
