= Patricia (butterfly) =

Scientific classification
- Domain: Eukaryota
- Kingdom: Animalia
- Phylum: Arthropoda
- Class: Insecta
- Order: Lepidoptera
- Family: Nymphalidae
- Subfamily: Danainae
- Tribe: Ithomiini
- Genus: Patricia; Fox, 1940

Genus of brush-footed butterflies

Patricia is a genus of clearwing (ithomiine) butterflies, named by Richard Middleton Fox in 1940. They are in the brush-footed butterfly family, Nymphalidae.

== Species ==
Arranged alphabetically:

- Patricia demylus (Godman & Salvin, 1879)
- Patricia dercyllidas (Hewitson, 1864)
- Patricia oligyrtis (Hewitson, 1877)
