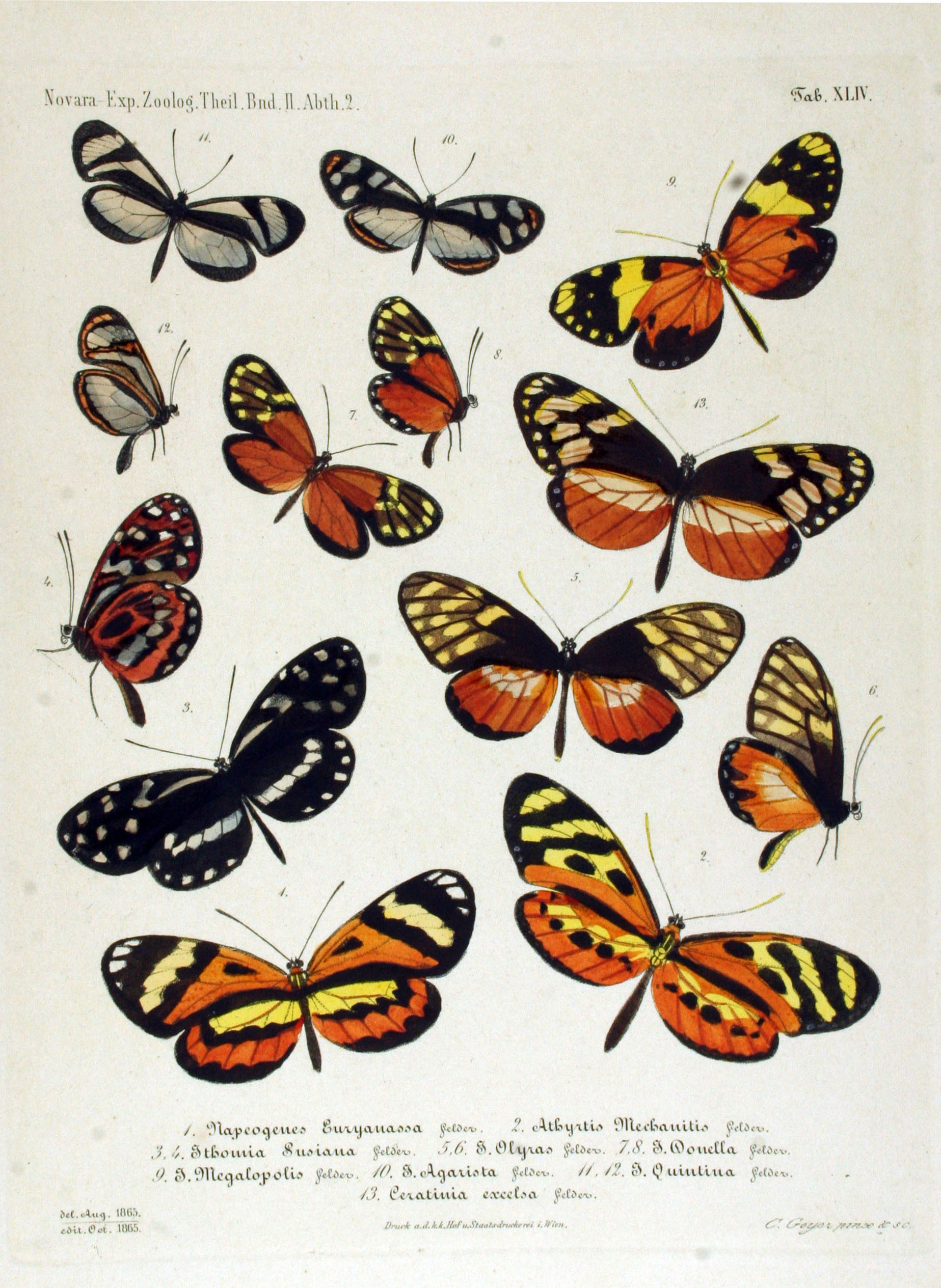
- Figure 2

Scientific classification
- Kingdom: Animalia
- Phylum: Arthropoda
- Class: Insecta
- Order: Lepidoptera
- Family: Nymphalidae
- Tribe: Ithomiini
- Genus: Athyrtis; C. & R. Felder, 1862
- Species: A. mechanitis

Binomial name
- Athyrtis mechanitis C. & R. Felder, 1862

= Athyrtis =

Monotypic brush-footed butterfly genus

Athyrtis is a butterfly genus of the Ithomiini tribe in the brush-footed butterfly family, Nymphalidae. It is a monotypic genus, containing only Athyrtis mechanitis. The genus and the species were named by father and son entomologists Cajetan and Rudolf Felder in 1862.
