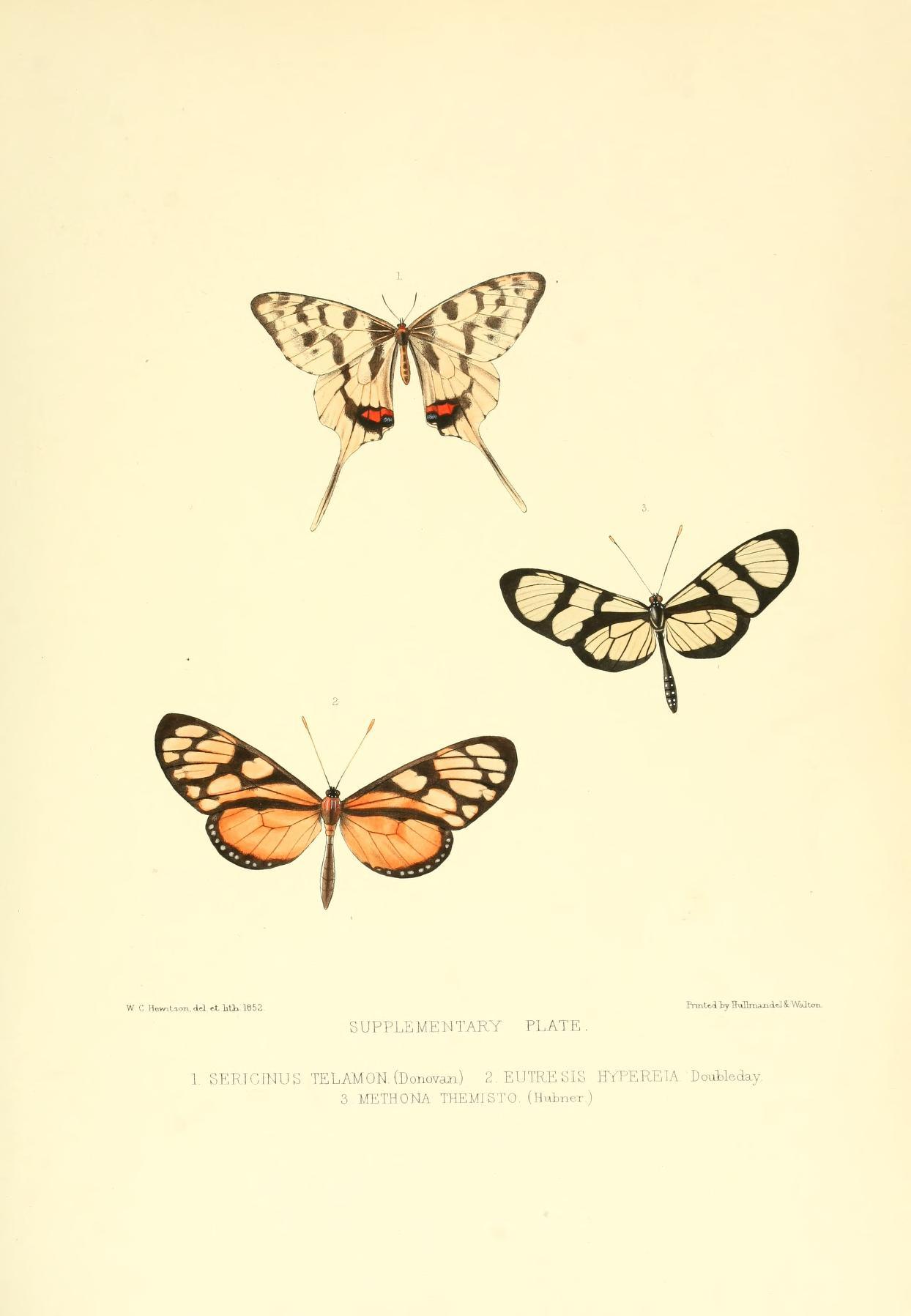
- Eutresis hypereia, figure 2

Scientific classification
- Kingdom: Animalia
- Phylum: Arthropoda
- Class: Insecta
- Order: Lepidoptera
- Family: Nymphalidae
- Tribe: Ithomiini
- Genus: Eutresis; Doubleday, 1847

Species
- See text

= Eutresis =

Genus of brush-footed butterflies

Eutresis is a genus of clearwing (ithomiine) butterflies, named by Edward Doubleday in 1847. They are in the brush-footed butterfly family, Nymphalidae.

== Species ==
Arranged alphabetically:

- Eutresis dilucida Staudinger, 1885
- Eutresis hypereia Doubleday, [1847]
