= Eutresis (Arcadia) =

Eutresis (Ancient Greek: Εὔτρησις) was a town in ancient Arcadia, in the district Eutresia.

Its site is unlocated.
