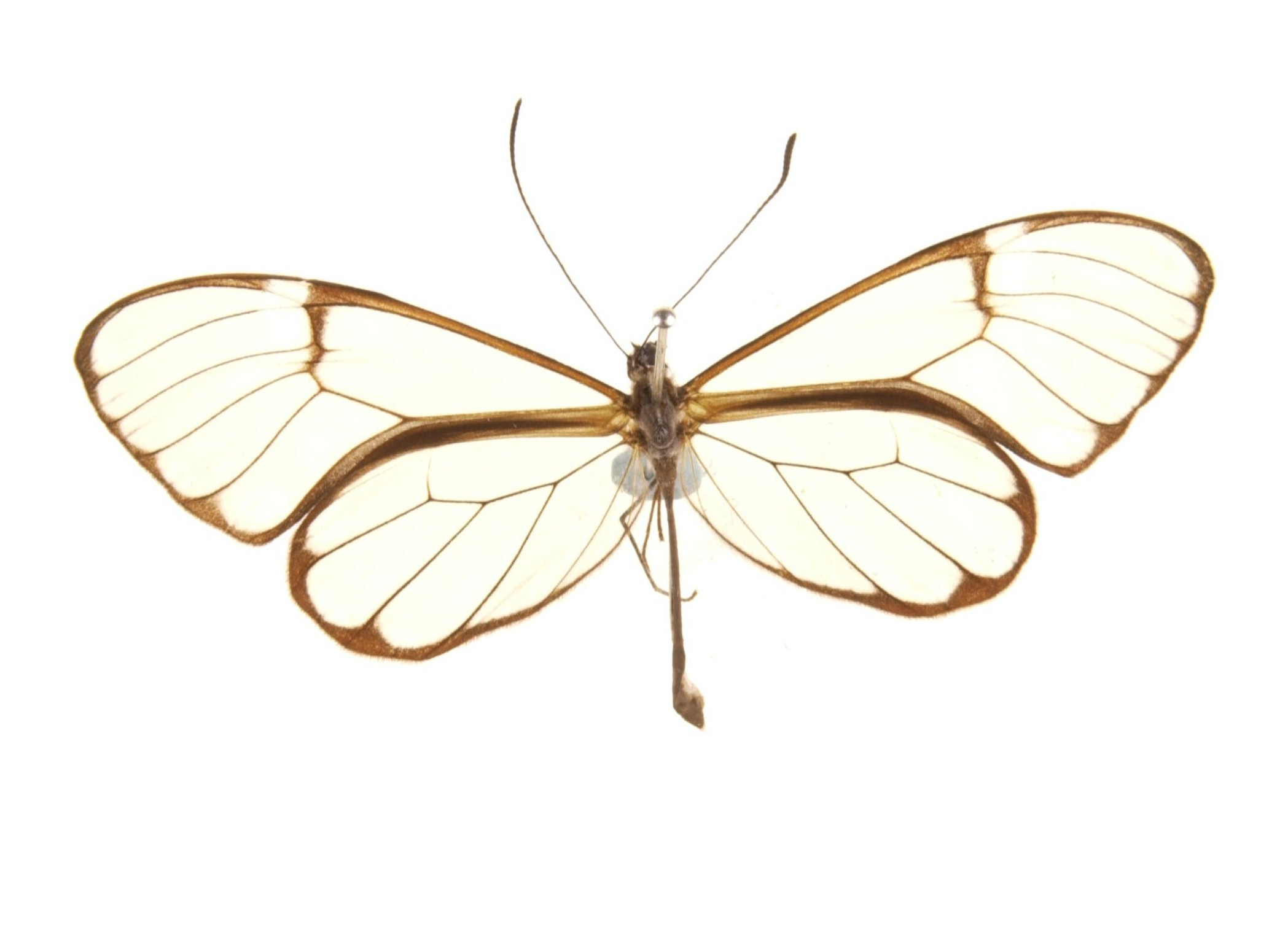
- Pteronomyia apuleia from Bolivia

Scientific classification
- Kingdom: Animalia
- Phylum: Arthropoda
- Class: Insecta
- Order: Lepidoptera
- Family: Nymphalidae
- Subfamily: Danainae
- Tribe: Ithomiini; Godman & Salvin, 1879

Genera
- 43 genera, see text

Diversity
- c. 370 species

= Ithomiini =

Tribe of butterflies in the subfamily Danainae

Ithomiini is a butterfly tribe in the nymphalid subfamily Danainae. It is sometimes referred to as the tribe of clearwing butterflies or glasswing butterflies. Some authors consider the group to be a subfamily (Ithomiinae). These butterflies are exclusively Neotropical, found in humid forests from sea level to 3000 m, from Mexico to Argentina. There are around 370 species in some 40–45 genera.

== Ithomiini biology ==
Ithomiines are unpalatable because their adults seek out and sequester pyrrolizidine alkaloids from plants that they visit, especially composite flowers (Asteraceae) and wilted borages (Boraginaceae). The slow-flying adults are Müllerian mimics of each other as well as of many other Lepidoptera. Henry Walter Bates referred to a "transparency group" of Amazon butterfly species. It was originally with seven species belonging to six different genera. Reginald Punnett suggested 28 species of this peculiar facies are known, though some are excessively rare. The majority are ithomiines, but two species of the Danaine genus Lycorea, the pierine Dismorphia orise the swallow-tail Parides hahneli, and several species of diurnal moths belonging to different families also enter into the combination. Identification of adult ithomiines relies on hindwing venation and male androconial scales (sex brushes located on the hindwing costa).

The group has repeatedly been proposed as biological indicators of ecological conditions or biological diversity within neotropical forests, but individual sites harbor between 10 and 50 species, for the most part, and beta diversity is often great, even over relatively short distances.

Ithomiine larvae feed mostly on Solanaceae host plants. Exceptions are the more basal genera Tithorea, Aeria, and Elzunia that, like Tellervo and some Danainae, feed on Echiteae vines (Apocynaceae, Apocynoideae), as well as Megoleria and Hyposcada that feed on Gesneriaceae.

The local abundance of ithomiine butterflies in the Amazon forest, the lack of observations of predation, and their "peculiar smell" led Henry Walter Bates in 1867 to suggest that these organisms should be chemically defended. This was first experimentally demonstrated in 1889 when Thomas Belt fed ithomiines (that he called "Heliconii") to birds, the spider Nephila, and the white faced monkey Cebus capucinus. The butterflies were consistently rejected, but other insects were eaten. Lincoln P. Brower in 1964 also showed that adults of Ithomia drymo pellucida were rejected by the blue jay Cyanocitta cristata bromia, and Haber showed that nine species of birds also rejected several ithomiine species. Besides, João Vasconcellos-Neto and Thomas M. Lewinsohn demonstrated that the Neotropical orb-weaving spider Nephila clavipes released unharmed 14 species of field-caught ithomiine butterflies.

The source of the protecting chemicals in the bodies of adult ithomiines proved not to be their larval host plants, as was first suggested, but rather in plants visited by the butterflies. Adults of ithomiine, mainly males, visit flowers of some Boraginaceae, (Tournefortia, Heliotropium), Asteraceae (mostly in the tribe Eupatorieae, and rarely on Senecio species), Apocynaceae (Prestonia, belonging to the tribe Echiteae) and Orchidaceae (Epidendrum paniculatum). Dead or withered plants are also visited and, when feeding on these plants, the butterflies scratch the tissues with their legs and suck the oozing sap. These plants are known to contain pyrrolizidine alkaloids, indicating their role as chemical sources for sequestration. Other butterfly and moth species that sequester pyrrolizidine alkaloids (Danainae, Ctenuchidae, and Arctiidae) also visit similar sources. The first demonstration that pyrrolizidine alkaloids were involved in the chemical defense of insects was given by Thomas Eisner, who showed that the spiders Nephila and Argiope rejected adults of the arctiid moth Utetheisa ornatrix that contain pyrrolizidine alkaloids from their larval host plant, Crotalaria (Fabaceae: Crotalarieae). Eisner's best-selling popular science book For Love of Insects tells the story of this exciting discovery.

== Ithomiini classification ==
The subtribes in the Ithomiini help to organize the 43 recognized genera, but this group is the subject of ongoing molecular, phylogenetic and morphological research, and the classification presented below will no doubt be refined in the near future.

The sister group to the tribe Ithomiini is either the small tribe Tellervini (containing the single Australasian genus Tellervo) or the larger tribe Danaini. The relationships of the three tribes in the subfamily Danainae are still unclear.

- Source: "The higher classification of Nymphalidae". Nymphalidae.net. Archived February 20, 2009.
- Note: A species list with proposed new tribes for subfamily Ithomiinae is available from Keith Willmott at .
- Note: Names preceded by an equal sign (=) are synonyms, homonyms, rejected names or invalid names.

Tribe Ithomiini Godman & Salvin, 1879

- Subtribe Tithoreina Fox, 1940
  - Elzunia Bryk, 1937
  - Tithorea Doubleday, 1847 (= Hirsutis Haensch, 1909)
  - Aeria Hübner, 1816
- Subtribe Melinaeina Clark, 1947
  - Athesis Doubleday, 1847 (= Roswellia Fox, 1948)
  - Eutresis Doubleday, 1847
  - Athyrtis C. Felder & R. Felder, 1862
  - Paititia Lamas, 1979
  - Olyras Doubleday, 1847
  - Patricia Fox, 1940
  - Melinaea Hübner, 1816 (= homonym Melinaea Bates, 1862; = Czakia Kremky, 1925)
- Subtribe Mechanitina Bar, 1878
  - Methona Doubleday, 1847 (= Gelotophye d'Almeida, 1940)
  - Thyridia Hübner, 1816 (= Xanthocleis Boisduval, 1870; = Aprotopus Kirby, 1871; = Aprotopos Kirby, 1871)
  - Scada Kirby, 1871 (= homonym Salacia Hübner, 1823; = Heteroscada Schatz, 1886)
  - Sais Hübner, 1816
  - Forbestra Fox, 1967
  - Mechanitis Fabricius, 1807 (= homonym Nereis Hübner, 1806; = unavailable name Hymenitis Illiger, 1807; = Epimetes Billberg, 1820)
- Subtribe Napeogenina
  - Aremfoxia Réal, 1971
  - Epityches d'Almeida, 1938 (= homonym Tritonia Geyer, 1832)
  - Hyalyris Boisduval, 1870 (= Oreogenes Stichel, 1899)
  - Napeogenes Bates, 1862 (= homonym Ceratonia Boisduval, 1870; = Choridis Boisduval, 1870)
  - Hypothyris Hübner, 1821 (= Mansueta d'Almeida, 1922; = Pseudomechanitis Röber, 1930; = Garsauritis d'Almeida, 1938; = Rhodussa d'Almeida, 1939)
- Subtribe Ithomiina Godman & Salvin, 1879
  - Placidina d'Almeida, 1928 (= Placidula d'Almeida, 1922)
  - Pagyris Boisduval, 1870 (= Miraleria Haensch, 1903)
  - Ithomia Hübner, 1816 (= Dynothea Reakirt, 1866)
- Subtribe Oleriina
  - Megoleria Constantino, 1999
  - Hyposcada Godman & Salvin, 1879
  - Oleria Hübner, 1816 (= Leucothyris Boisduval, 1870; = Ollantaya Brown & Freitas, 1994)
- Subtribe Dircennina d'Almeida, 1941
  - Ceratinia Hübner, 1816 (= Calloleria Godman & Salvin, 1879; = Epileria Rebel, 1902; = Teracinia Röber, 1910)
  - Callithomia Bates, 1862 (= Cleodis Boisduval, 1870; = Epithomia Godman & Salvin, 1879; = Corbulis Boisduval, 1870; = Leithomia Masters, 1973)
  - Dircenna Doubleday, 1847
  - Hyalenna Forbes, 1942
  - Episcada Godman & Salvin, 1879 (= Ceratiscada Brown & d'Almeida, 1970; = Prittwitzia Brown, Mielke & Ebert, 1970)
  - Haenschia Lamas, 2004
  - Pteronymia Butler & H. Druce, 1872 (= Ernicornis Capronnier, 1874; = Parapteronymia Kremky, 1925; = Talamancana Haber, Brown & Freitas, 1994)
- Subtribe Godyridina
  - Velamysta Haensch, 1909
  - Godyris Boisduval, 1870 (= Dismenitis Haensch, 1903; = Dygoris Fox, 1945)
  - Veladyris Fox, 1945
  - Hypoleria Godman & Salvin, 1879 (= homonym Pigritia d'Almeida, 1922; = homonym Pigritina Hedicke, 1923; = homonym Heringia d'Almeida, 1924)
  - Brevioleria Lamas, 2004
  - Mcclungia Fox, 1940
  - Greta Hemming, 1934 (= homonym Hymenitis Hübner, 1819; = Hypomenitis Fox, 1945)
  - Heterosais Godman & Salvin, 1880 (= Rhadinoptera d'Almeida, 1922)
  - Pseudoscada Godman & Salvin, 1879 (= Languida d'Almeida, 1922)

== See also ==
- Mimicry
- Animal coloration
