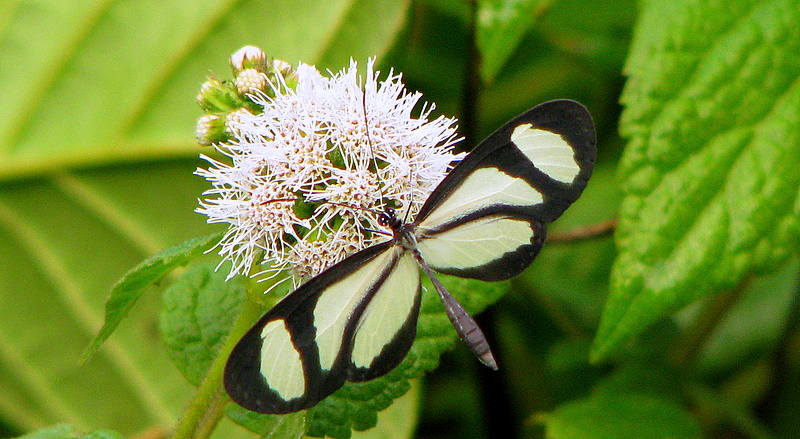
- Aeria olena

Scientific classification
- Kingdom: Animalia
- Phylum: Arthropoda
- Class: Insecta
- Order: Lepidoptera
- Family: Nymphalidae
- Subfamily: Danainae
- Tribe: Ithomiini
- Genus: Aeria; Hübner, 1816

= Aeria (butterfly) =

Genus of brush-footed butterflies

Aeria is a genus of clearwing (ithomiine) butterflies named by Jacob Hübner in 1816. They are in the brush-footed butterfly family, Nymphalidae.

The genus Aeria has one species and two subspecies: Aeria eurimedia is the species; the two subspecies are Aeria eurimedia pacifica and Aeria eurimedia agna.

Aeria eurimedia pacifica are typically found in places like Guatemala, British Honduras, and Honduras.

Aeria eurimedia agna are typically found in places like Nicaragua, Panama, coastal drainage regions of northern Colombia, Venezuela, and Trinidad. They may also be referred to as "Hypoleria agna". This subspecies is more common in southern Central America.

== Life cycle ==
The developmental stage for the Aeria eurimedia takes about 28 days. The process of the female laying eggs is called oviposition. First, she searches around the forest until she finds a plant suitable enough to lay her eggs. Once she finds an ideal location, she lays an egg near the edge of the leaf.

The host plant most females choose is called Prestonia. These plants are native to many different countries including but not limited to Argentina, Bolivia, Brazil, Colombia, Costa Rica, Ecuador, Guyana, Nicaragua, Panamá, Paraguay, Peru, Trinidad and Tobago, and Venezuela.

=== Larva ===
Once the caterpillar emerges from the egg and eats the shell, it must find a young leaf to begin feeding. Younger leaves are more ideal for this process. If it cannot find a younger leaf, it usually goes back to the original site. The caterpillar then remains on the ventral side of the leaf while it feeds.

The caterpillar first bites a whole through the midrib of the leaf. Its purpose is to weaken the leaf, making it easier to eat. They usually begin feeding at the edge of the leaf and work their way toward the center. Older leaves are eaten in a straight pattern. Younger leaves are eaten entirely by the caterpillar, mainly because they contain more nutrients which is ideal for a growing caterpillar. Their feeding pattern is to eat sporadically throughout the day.

At the time of oviposition, eggs are white in color and take on an oblong shape. They remain in this state for about 5 days. Once they're ready to hatch, they take on a deep yellow color. When they first hatch, the caterpillars emerge in dark green with hints of a lighter shade along the sides. The head is black and round with a pale green collar behind it. Within 4 days, the caterpillar can grow up to 4 millimeters. In the next stage, small blue and green stripes begin to appear along the body. The head is in a bulb-like shape and is orange with a glossy look to it. The collar is now a dull orange color. After another 4 days, the caterpillar grows up to 8 millimeters in length. In their third stage, they appear the same with a few new features. The stripes that were once blue and green are now light blue and black. The color becomes more prominent. Five days later, they grow to 14 millimeters. This marks the midpoint of their larvae state. The fourth and fifth stages are similar to the previous stage in that they don't change much in appearance. The black stripes become thicker in width and the light blue stripes are now white. In the fourth stage, the larvae grow up to 18 millimeters. In the fifth and final stage, they grow up to 25 millimeters. Both growth stages take about 5 days.

=== Pupa ===
The next phase of life is the pupa stage. The caterpillar positions itself on the host plant as it prepares to become a pupa. The pupa is translucent with black patterns along the wing cases. They're about 14 millimeters long and 6 millimeters wide. After about 3 days, their once translucent appearance is now gold and reflective. The wing cases now have a black border with a thick red stripe across. The antennal and leg cases appear black with a few black dots halfway along the case. This phase lasts about 12 days.

=== Adult ===
The butterfly then emerges from the pupa in a process called eclosion, which usually takes place in the morning hours. Once an adult, the butterfly's wingspan is about 50 millimeters in width while the body is 20 millimeters in length. In young adults, the wings appear bright and light yellow with black along the borders. Dark gray dots may also appear along the outer borders.

== Species ==
Arranged alphabetically:

- Aeria elara (Hewitson, 1855)
- Aeria eurimedia (Cramer, [1777])
- Aeria olena Weymer, 1875
