= Richard Haensch =

German entomologist and insect dealer

Richard Hänsch or Haensch (16 September 1865 – ?) was a German entomologist, zoologist, and insect dealer in Berlin.

Haensch was born in Rostock, Grand Duchy of Mecklenburg-Schwerin, to Carl Helmuth Hänsch and Maria Otilie Dorothea Krüger.

He collected in Bahia (1893–1894) and Minas Gerais (1896–1897) in Brazil, and in Ecuador (1899–1900).

He wrote the section "Familie Danaidae" in Die Gross-Schmetterlinge der Erde [The Large Butterflies of the World] (1909–1910) edited by Adalbert Seitz and published by Alfred Kernen, Stuttgart, Germany. His revision of the subfamily Ithomiinae is still the standard work. The types of the new taxa he described are in Museum für Naturkunde Berlin. Coleoptera and Arachnida supplied by his dealership are in the same museum. Hemiptera (rarely available from dealerships) are in Staatliches Museum für Tierkunde Dresden and Institute of Zoology, Polish Academy of Sciences, Warsaw (originally supplied to Natural History Museum, Stettin) and in the German Entomological Institute collection.

Haensch is commemorated in the scientific name of a species of South American lizard, Stenocercus haenschi.

== Sources ==
- Gädecke R., Groll, E.K. (editors) (2010). Biografien der Entomologen der Welt: Datenbank. Version 4.15. Senckenberg Deutsches Entomologisches Institut. (in German).
