= Morgan =

Morgan may refer to:

== Arts and entertainment ==
- Morgan – A Suitable Case for Treatment, also called Morgan!, a 1966 comedy film
- Morgan (2012 film), an American drama
- Morgan (2016 film), an American science fiction thriller
- Morgan (band), an early 1970s band
- Morgan, a graphic novel by Hugo Pratt

== Businesses ==
- Morgan (clothing) (Morgan de Toi), a French clothing brand
- Morgan Motor Company, a British sports car manufacturer
- Morgan's, formerly a Canadian department store
- Morgan Advanced Materials, a British manufacturing company
- Morgans Hotel Group, boutique style hotel group
  - Morgans Hotel, located on Madison Avenue, New York City
- CP Morgan, a defunct homebuilding company
- D. H. Morgan Manufacturing, a roller coaster manufacturer
- Roy Morgan, an Australian company which produces the Morgan Poll

== Places ==
=== United States ===
- Morgan, Georgia
- Morgan, Iowa
- Morgan, Minnesota
- Morgan, Missouri
- Morgan, Montana
- Morgan, New Jersey
- Morgan, Oregon
- Morgan, Pennsylvania
- Morgan, Texas
- Morgan, Utah
- Morgan, Vermont
- Morgan, West Virginia
- Morgan, Wisconsin
- Morgan, Oconto County, Wisconsin, an unincorporated community
- Morgan, Shawano County, Wisconsin, an unincorporated community
- Morgan Mountain, Tehama County, California
- Mount Morgan (Inyo County, California)
- Mount Morgan (Mono County, California)
- Mount Morgan (Montana)
- Morgan Farm, Texas

=== Elsewhere ===
- Mount Morgan (Antarctica), Marie Byrd Land
- Morgan Peak, Palmer Land, Antarctica
- Morgan, South Australia, Australia, a town

== Science and technology ==
- Morgan (unit), a unit of recombinant frequency in genetics
- Duron 'Morgan', an alias used by a model of the AMD Duron processor

=== Animals ===
- Morgan (orca), a killer whale in poor health captured in June 2010 for rehabilitation
- Morgan horse, one of the earliest horse breeds developed in the US

== People and fictional characters ==
- Morgan (given name), including a list of people and fictional characters
- Morgan (surname), a surname of multiple origins
- Morgan le Fay, a powerful witch in Arthurian legend
- Henry Morgan (c. 1635–1688; Captain Morgan), Welsh privateer and governor of Jamaica
- Morgan (singer) (born 1972), Italian musician Marco Castoldi
- Morgen (mythological creature) or Morgan, a Welsh or Breton water spirit

== Other uses ==
- Charles W. Morgan (ship), a historical ship (whaler)
- Morgan Farm (Sumter County, Georgia), historic farmstead in Georgia, US
- Morgan F.C., an early twentieth century US soccer team
- Morgan dollar, a U.S. coin minted from 1878 to 1921
- Morgan State University, Baltimore, Maryland, US
- Morgan station, Chicago, US, a former railway station, now a rapid transit station
- Moken or Morgan, a seafaring ethnic group in the Andaman Sea

== See also ==
- Captain Morgan, a brand of rum
- Morgan Stanley, an American multinational financial services corporation
- JPMorgan Chase, an American multinational banking and financial services holding company
- Morgan the Pirate (disambiguation)
- Morgan Bridge (disambiguation)
- Morgan City (disambiguation)
- Morgan County (disambiguation)
- Morgan Creek (disambiguation)
- Morgan le Fay (disambiguation)
- Morgan High School (disambiguation)
- Morgan Hill (disambiguation)
- Morgan House (disambiguation)
- Morgan Park (disambiguation)
- Morgan Run (disambiguation)
- Morgan Township (disambiguation)
- De Morgan, a surname
- Fort Morgan (disambiguation)
- Morganton (disambiguation)
- Morgantown (disambiguation)
- Morganville (disambiguation)
- Morgana (disambiguation)
- Morgane (disambiguation)
- Morgaine (disambiguation)
- Morgen (disambiguation)
