= Morgan House =

Morgan House may refer to several historical buildings in the following places:

== United States ==
(by state, then city)

- Morgan-Curtis House, Phenix City, Alabama, listed on the Alabama Register of Landmarks and Heritage
- John Tyler Morgan House, Selma, Alabama, listed on the National Register of Historic Places (NRHP)
- David Morgan-Earl A. Bronson House, Phoenix, Arizona, NRHP-listed in Maricopa County
- Morgan House (Willcox, Arizona), NRHP-listed in Cochise County
- Julia Morgan House, Sacramento, California, NRHP-listed
- Morgan-Ille Cottage, Tybee Island, Georgia, NRHP-listed in Chatham County
- Morgan-Wells House, Quincy, Illinois, NRHP-listed
- Morgan House (Bloomington, Indiana), NRHP-listed
- Morgan-Skinner-Boyd Homestead, Merrillville, Indiana, NRHP-listed
- W.H. Morgan House, Peabody, Kansas, NRHP-listed
- Morgan House (Topeka, Kansas), NRHP-listed in Shawnee County
- Joseph Morgan House, Harrodsburg, Kentucky, NRHP-listed in Mercer County
- Hunt-Morgan House, Lexington, Kentucky, in the NRHP-listed Gratz Park Historic District
- Ralph Morgan Stone House, Mount Sterling, Kentucky, NRHP-listed in Montgomery County
- Horace Gilbert/Morgan and Enos Miller House, Swartz Creek, Michigan, NRHP-listed
- Canfield-Morgan House, Cedar Grove, New Jersey, NRHP-listed
- George Jr. and Sarah Morgan House, Washington Township, Gloucester County, New Jersey, NRHP-listed
- Griffith Morgan House, Pennsauken Township, New Jersey, NRHP-listed
- E. B. Morgan House, Aurora, New York, NRHP-listed
- Morgan–Manning House, Brockport, New York, NRHP-listed
- Morgan House (South Mills, North Carolina), NRHP-listed
- Garrett Morgan House, Cleveland, Ohio, NRHP-listed in Cuyahoga County
- Morgan Mansion, Wellston, Ohio, NRHP-listed
- Melinda E. Morgan House, Portland, Oregon, NRHP-listed
- Legare-Morgan House, Aiken, South Carolina, NRHP-listed
- Morgan House (Central, South Carolina), NRHP-listed
- Morgan House (Christiana, Tennessee), NRHP-listed in Rutherford County
- Col. Gideon Morgan House, Kingston, Tennessee, NRHP-listed
- Chesser-Morgan House, Georgetown, Texas, NRHP-listed in Williamson County
- David Morgan House, Goshen, Utah, NRHP-listed
- Jesse Morgan House, Park City, Utah, NRHP-listed in Utah County
- Saratoga (Boyce, Virginia), Boyce, Virginia, NRHP-listed as the General Daniel Morgan House
- Daniel Morgan House, Winchester, Virginia, NRHP-listed
- O. L. and Josephine Morgan House, Port Townsend, Washington, NRHP-listed in Jefferson County
- Morgan-Gold House, Bunker Hill, West Virginia, NRHP-listed
- William G. Morgan House, Bunker Hill, West Virginia, NRHP-listed
- George Pinkney Morgan House, Rivesville, West Virginia, NRHP-listed
- Morgan-Bedinger-Dandridge House, Sheperdstown, West Virginia, NRHP-listed
- John R. Morgan House, Oskosh, Wisconsin, NRHP-listed in Winnebago County
- J. H. Morgan House, Plover, Wisconsin, NRHP-listed in Portage County
- George E. Morgan House, Shorewood, Wisconsin, NRHP-listed in Milwaukee County

== India ==
Morgan House, Kalimpong
