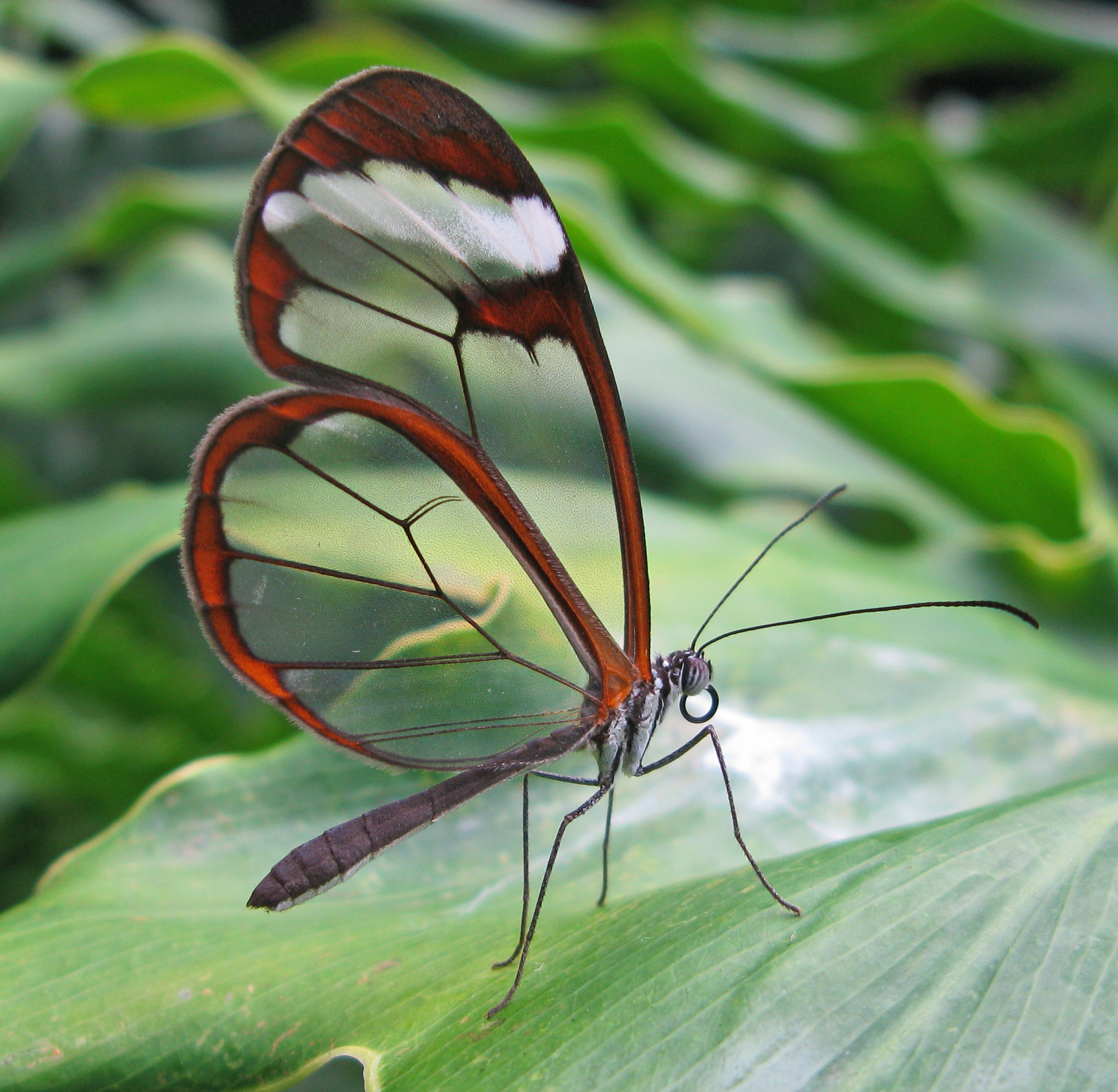

Scientific classification
- Kingdom: Animalia
- Phylum: Arthropoda
- Clade: Pancrustacea
- Class: Insecta
- Order: Lepidoptera
- Family: Nymphalidae
- Genus: Greta
- Species: G. oto

Binomial name
- Greta oto (Hewitson, 1854)
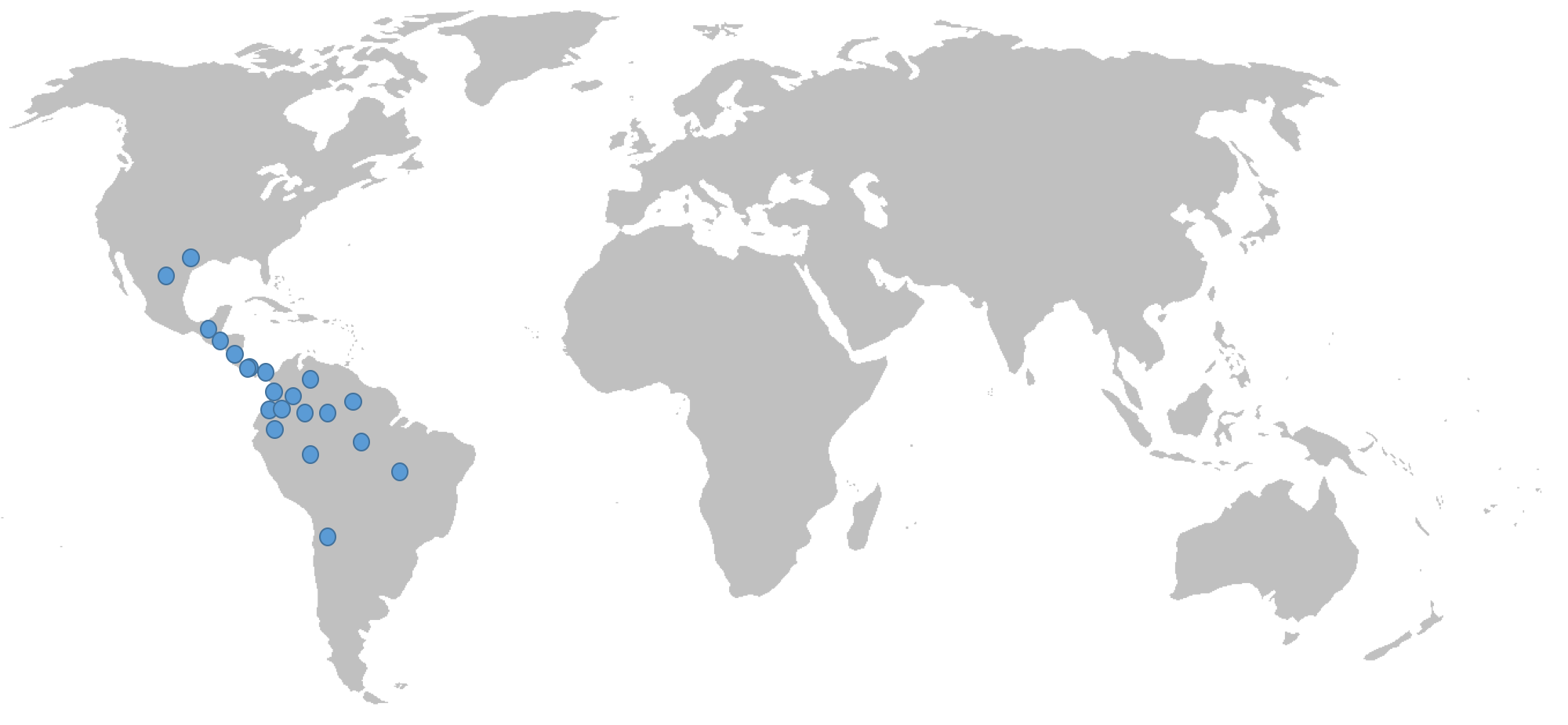
- Distribution of Greta oto

= Greta oto =

Glasswing butterfly

Species of butterfly

Greta oto is a species of brush-footed butterfly and member of the subfamily Danainae, tribe Ithomiini, and subtribe Godyridina. It is known by the common name glasswing butterfly for its transparent wings, which allow it to camouflage without extensive coloration. In Spanish-speaking regions, it may also be referred to as espejitos, meaning "little mirrors" because of its transparent wings. The butterfly is mainly found in Central America and northern regions of South America, with sightings as far north as Texas and as far south as Chile. While its wings appear delicate, the butterfly is able to carry up to 40 times its own weight. In addition to its wing physiology, the butterfly is known for behaviors such as long migrations and lekking. Greta oto closely resembles Greta andromica.

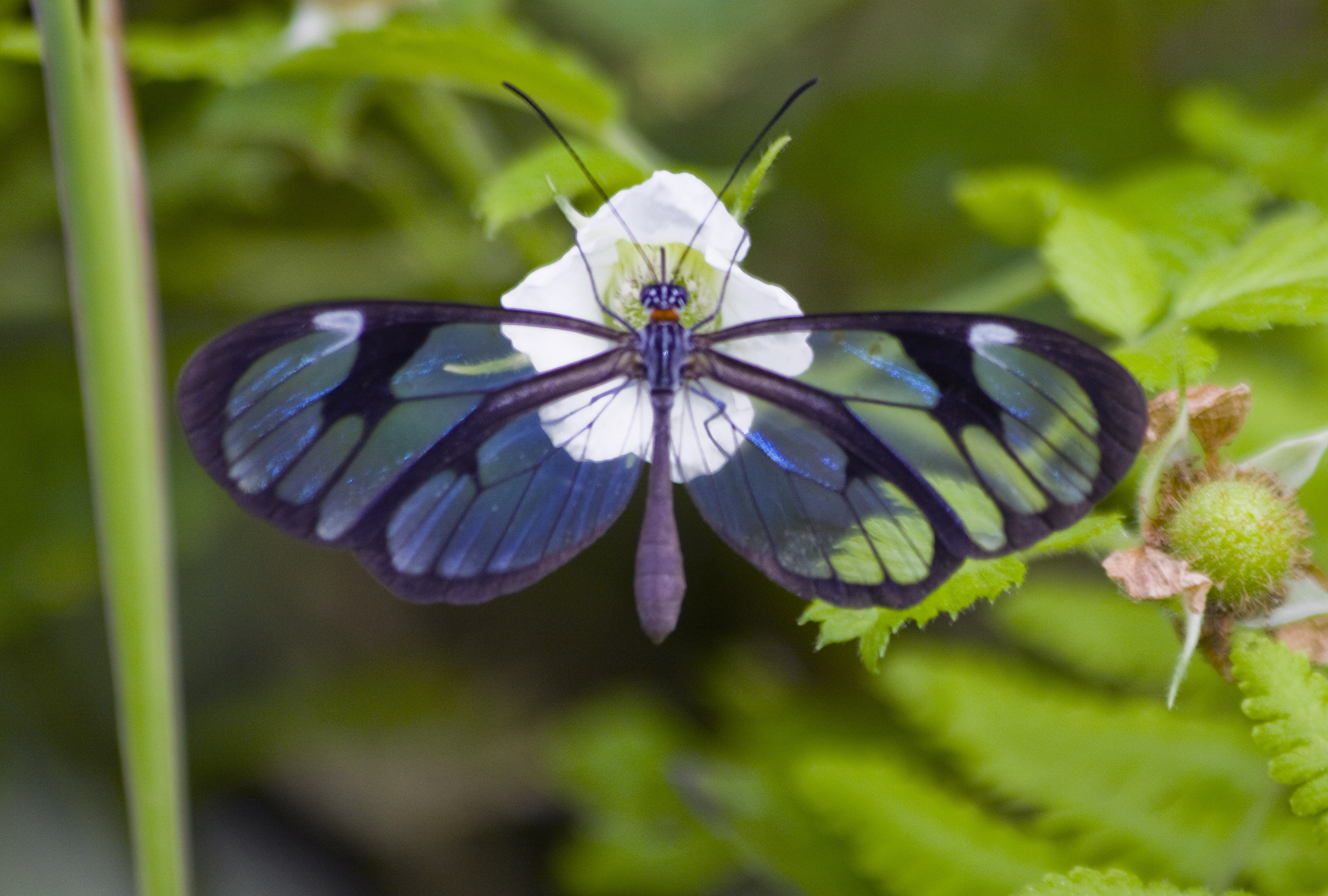
Greta oto in the Juréia-Itatins Ecological Station (state of São Paulo, Brazil)

== Geographic range and habitat ==
The glasswing butterfly is most commonly found from Central to South America as far south as Chile, with appearances as north as Mexico and Texas. This butterfly thrives in the tropical conditions of the rainforests in the Central and South American countries.

== Lifecycle ==
=== Egg ===
Eggs are typically laid on plants of the genus Cestrum, a member of the nightshade family, which serves as a food source for their later life stages.

=== Larva ===
The caterpillars of the glasswing butterfly have green bodies, with yellow stripes in later stages. They are found on the host plants of the genus Cestrum. The larvae are cylindrical in shape with dorsal projections that are smooth with filaments. These properties make the larvae extremely reflective, which essentially causes them to be invisible to predators.

=== Pupa ===
The pupae are initially green with black specks, later becoming silver in colour. During the fifth instar stage, the pupa produces a silk pad on the lower surface of leaves through four spinning movements, onto which it attaches. The silk fibers are important in providing greater flexibility to the pupal attachment. The cremaster, a hooked bristle-like structure on the pupa, attaches to this silk pad by a series of lateral movements of the pupa's posterior abdomen. Pupal attachment failure occurs when the silk pad breaks. Additionally, the pupal attachment has high tensile strength and toughness, which prevent the pupa from being pulled by predators or breaking off in the wind, allowing it to swing safely.

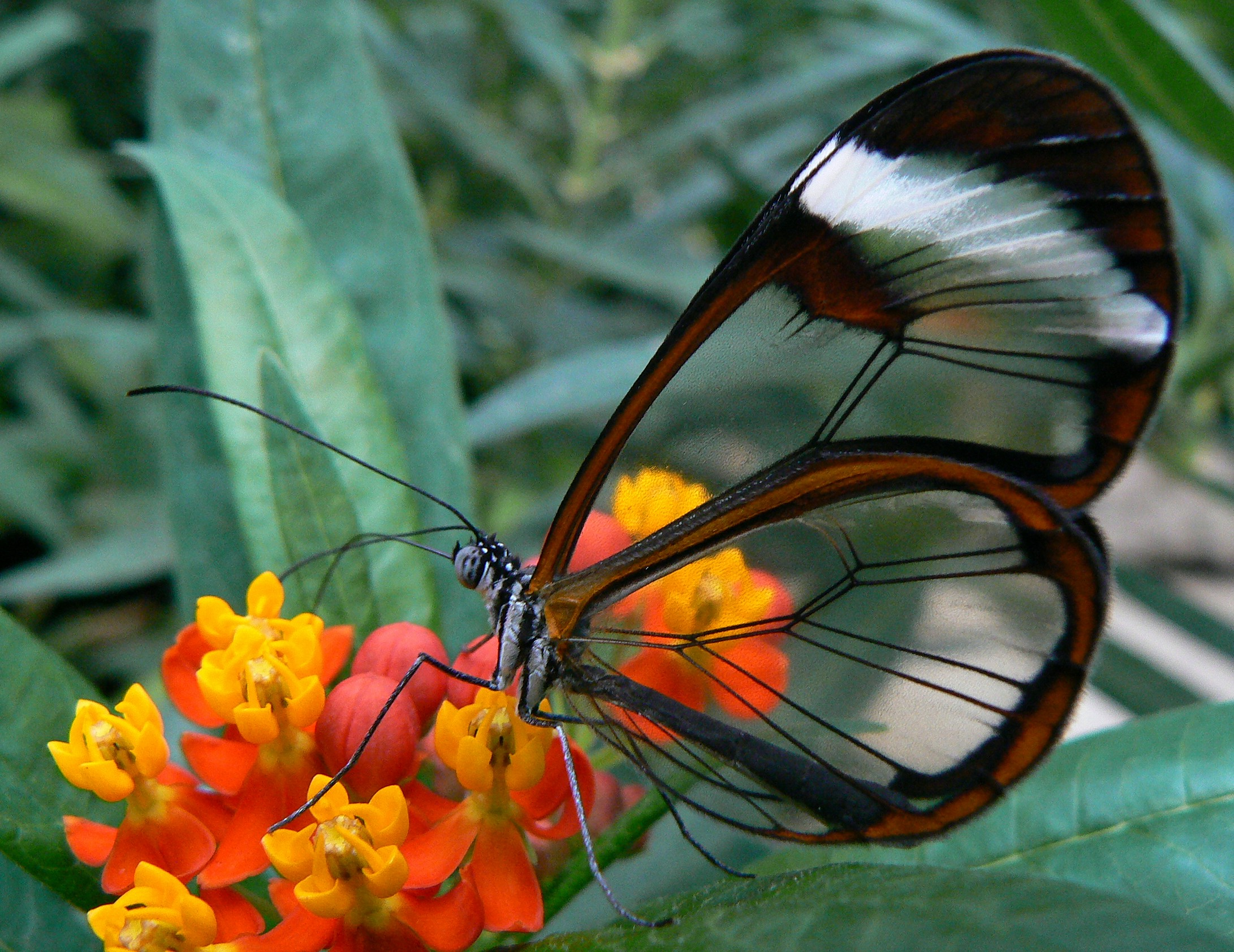
Greta oto adult

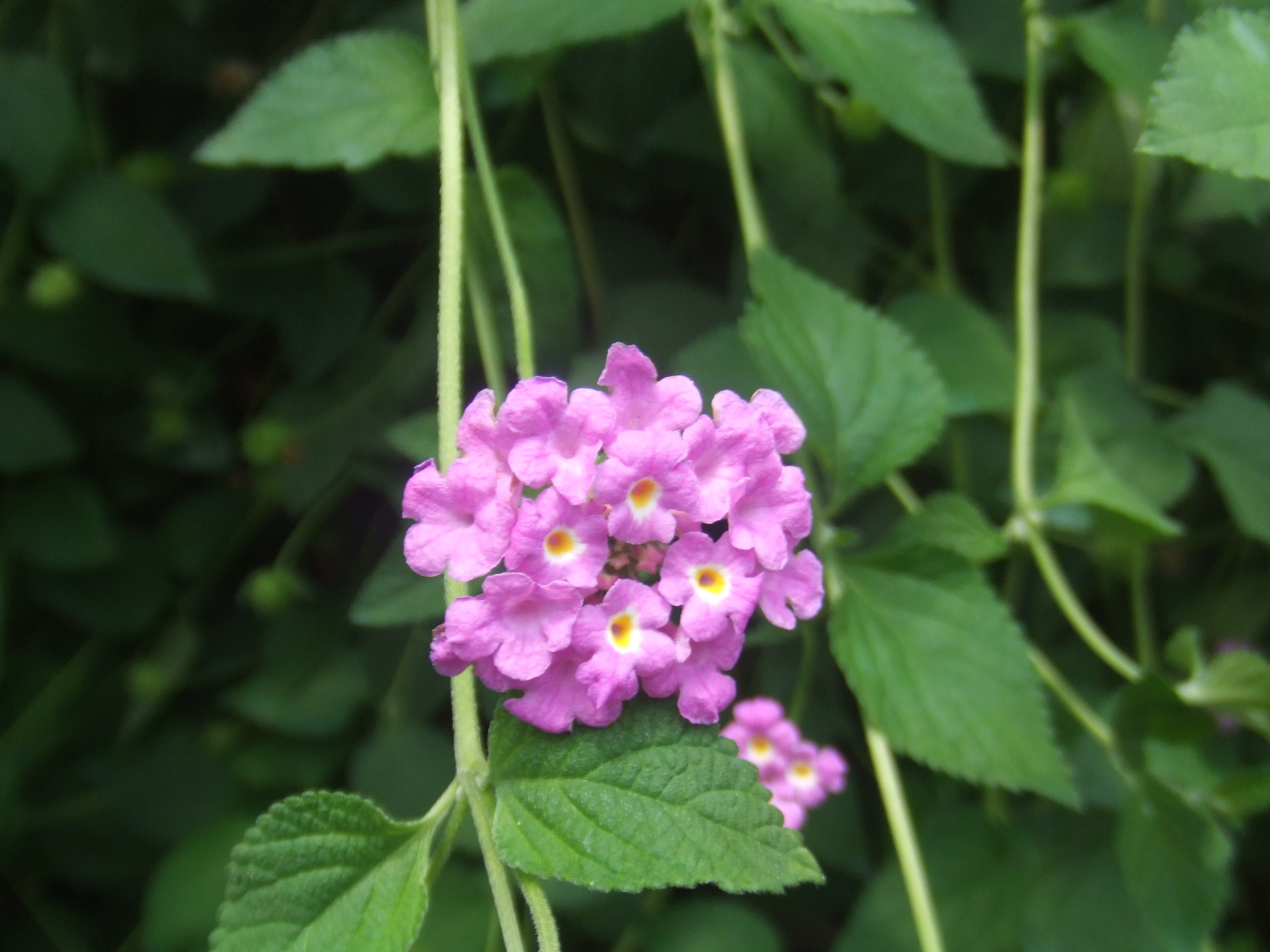
Lantana flower nectar is a food source for adult glasswing butterflies.

=== Adult ===
The adult glasswing butterfly can be identified by its transparent wings with opaque, dark-brown borders tinted with red or orange. Its body is a dark brown color. The butterfly is 2.8 to 3.0 cm (1.1 to 1.2 in) long and has a wingspan of 5.6 to 6.1 cm (2.2 to 2.4 in).

== Food resources ==
=== Caterpillar ===
Poisonous plants of the genus Cestrum provide the best source of nutrition for the caterpillar; when larvae use other host plants, they often die in the first instar stage or develop more slowly. The caterpillars feed on these toxic plants and are perhaps toxic to predators through secondary chemicals stored in their tissues. For example, the caterpillar's chemical extracts are unpalatable to Paraponera clavata ants.

=== Adult ===
The adult butterfly feeds mainly on the nectar of the flowers of the genus Lantana, which includes 150 species of perennial flowering plants. They also eat flowers in the Asteraceae and Boraginaceae families and the droppings of insectivorous birds, absorbing amino acids that are later converted to proteins. Adult butterflies are also toxic due to the males consuming Asteraceae flowers whose nectar contains pyrrolizidine alkaloids.

== Migration ==
The glasswing butterfly is migratory and travels up to 12 mi (19 km) per day at speeds of up to 8 mph (13 km/h). It migrates to change elevations, which causes population density differences in varying geographical areas.

== Predation ==
Birds are common predators of this butterfly. The glasswing combats predators by consuming toxins through plants of genus Cestrum and family Asteraceae in both the caterpillar and butterfly stages. Toxin consumption gives the butterfly a foul taste that discourages predation.

=== Protective coloration ===
This butterfly uses its transparency to hide from predators by camouflaging into the background during flight. Transparency is a rare trait among the Lepidoptera; they more commonly use mimicry to ward off predators.

== Mating ==
This butterfly species mates polygynously, with males attempting to obtain one or more female mates per breeding season.

=== Lekking ===
To attract females, male butterflies form leks, or large gatherings, where males compete for mates. They gather in shaded areas of the rainforest and competitively display themselves to attract mates. Male glasswing butterflies also release pheromones during lekking to attract females. The pheromones produced are derived from pyrrolizidine alkaloids that the butterflies obtain through their diet of plants of the Asteraceae. The alkaloids are then converted to pheromones through the formation of a pyrrole ring, followed by ester cleavage and oxidation. Additionally, since the process by which the pheromone is produced is not only formed by butterflies and moths themselves, but also derived from plants, as with the glasswing butterfly, the pheromone is unlikely to be used to distinguish between species.

== Physiology ==
=== Wings ===
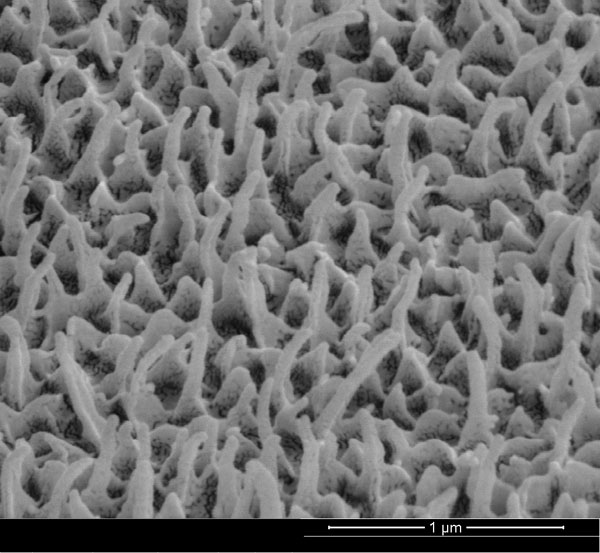
Glasswing butterfly wing nanopillars

Wing transparency in Greta oto results from the combination of several properties; low absorption of visible light, low scattering of the light that passes through the wings, and low reflection of the light impinging on the wing's surface. The majority of light across a broad range of incident wavelengths, covering the entire visible spectrum, allows light to pass rather than reflect, regardless of incidence angle.

This broadband and omnidirectional antireflection property originates from nanopillars on the wing's surface. The nanopillars create a smooth gradient of refraction angles between the wing's membrane and air. These nanopillars, seemingly randomly arranged on the wing's surface, possess a high aspect ratio (defined as height divided by radius), where the radii are below the wavelengths of the visible light. The random height and width distribution of the nanopillars creates an even refractive index gradient, causing light to pass without reflection across wavelengths and directions. These properties are further improved by the presence of pedestals at the base of the nanopillars. Additionally, the structure of the nanopillars allows for the wings to have a low roughness factor because of its tiny hair-like microtrichia features. This was experimentally tested through water droplet adhesion to the wings.

== Conservation ==
These parks and reserves in Costa Rica currently feature the glasswing butterfly and are working on their conservation: Guanacaste National Park, Rincón de la Vieja National Park, Monteverde Cloud Forest Reserve, Palo Verde National Park, Carara National Park, Poás Volcano National Park, La Selva Reserve and Biological Station, Juan Castro Blanco National Park, Irazú Volcano National Park, Chirripó National Park, and La Amistad International Park.

== Namesake ==
The species is the namesake of Project Glasswing, a 2026 cybersecurity initiative by Anthropic and other technology partners. The project name references the butterfly's transparent wings, drawing a parallel to hidden software vulnerabilities that "hide in plain sight".
