= Morgan (given name) =

- Morgan le Fay
- Gender: Unisex
- Language: Welsh / Breton

Origin
- Meaning: Sea chief or famous magic (male); Sea-born or Magic Enchantress (female)

Other names
- Related names: Morcant, Morgain, Morgaine, Morgana, Morgane, Morganna, Morgant, Morgen, Morghan, Morgue

Morgan is a name of Welsh and Breton origin. Traditionally, it is a masculine name in Wales and Brittany, but has become unisex in modern times. Morgan is also used as a surname, derived from the given name.

The name is a descendant of Old Welsh Morcant, possibly derived from môr (meaning "sea") and "cant" (the circle) or "gen" (come / origin) with the meaning: "sea chief", "sea protector", "sea defender" or "sailor/captain". Contemporaneous records of the first Mormaer, or count de Mar, spelt his name Morggán, Earl of Mar.

The use of the name for women may be inspired by the character Morgan le Fay from Arthurian legend. For the etymology of Morgan le Fay, see Morgan le Fay § Etymology and origins.

In the United States it is commonly used for any gender, although it has become a more popular name for women than men since the 1990s. The name is also used for any gender in other English-speaking countries, including Canada, Australia, the United Kingdom and New Zealand. The French feminine version of the name is Morgane.

== Notable people ==
=== Female ===
- Morgan Andrews (born 1995), American soccer player
- Morgan Brittany (born 1951), American actress
- Morgan Fairchild (born 1950), American actress
- Morgan Featherstone (born 1994), Australian fashion model
- Morgan Gautrat (born 1993), American soccer player
- Morgan Harper (born 1983), American attorney
- Morgan Hurd (born 2001), American gymnast
- Morgan James (born 1981), American musician
- Morgan Joanel, Australian pop singer-songwriter and visual artist
- Morgan Maly (born 2002), American basketball player
- Morgan Pressel (born 1988), American professional golfer
- Morgan Romano (born 1998), American model and beauty queen
- Morgan Tuck (born 1994), American basketball player
- Morgan Webb (born 1978), American television presenter and producer
- Morgan White (born 1983), American gymnast
- Morgan William (born 1996), American basketball player

=== Male ===
- Morgan (bishop), Bishop-elect of Durham in 1215 and illegitimate son of King Henry II of England
- Morgan Bulkeley (1837–1922), American politician and businessman
- Morgan Burtwistle (born 2001), English Twitch streamer and YouTuber
- Morgan Davies (born 2001), Australian actor
- Morgan De Sanctis (born 1977), Italian soccer player
- Morgan Earp (1851–1882), American lawman, brother of Wyatt Earp
- Morgan Ensberg (born 1975), American baseball player
- Morgan Dix (1827–1908), American Episcopal Church priest, theologian, and religious author
- Morgan M. Finley (1925–2016), American politician and businessman
- Morgan Fisher (born 1950), British musician and photographer
- Morgan Freeman (born 1937), American actor, director, and narrator
- Morgan Frost (born 1999), Canadian hockey player
- Morgan Green (born 1987), American footballer
- Morgan Grim (born 1988), American basketball player
- Morgan Groth (born 1943), American middle-distance runner
- Morgan Hamm (born 1982), American gymnast
- Morgan Johansson (born 1970), Swedish politician
- Morgan Jones (disambiguation), several people
- Morgan Luttrell (born 1975), American politician
- Morgan McSweeney (born 1977), Irish-born British political strategist
- Morgan Nicholls (born 1971), English musician
- Morgan Phillips (1902–1963), Welsh politician and trade union activist, General Secretary of the British Labour Party
- Morgan Philips Price (1885–1973), British politician
- Morgan Rielly (born 1994), Canadian ice hockey player
- Morgan Rogers (born 2002), English football player
- Morgan Sanson (born 1994), French football player
- Morgan Schneiderlin (born 1989), French football player
- Morgan Spurlock (1970–2024), American filmmaker, screenwriter and producer
- Morgan Stevens (1951–2022), American actor
- Morgan Tsvangirai (1952–2018), prime minister of Zimbabwe from 2009 to 2013
- Morgan Wallen (born 1993), American country pop musician
- Morgan Ward (1901–1963), American mathematician
- Morgan White (1924–2010), American radio DJ and actor
- Morgan Wootten (1931–2020), American basketball coach

== Fictional characters ==
- Morgan le Fay, a powerful enchantress in the Arthurian legend
- Morgan Jones, in The Walking Dead franchise
- Morgan the Midnight Fairy, in the book series Rainbow Magic
- Morgan, the child of Robin from the video game Fire Emblem Awakening
- Morgan Stark, a Marvel comics character
  - the Marvel Cinematic Universe version of the character
