= Morgaine =

Morgaine may refer to:

- Morgaine, alternative name for Morgan le Fay in original legends and some modern adaptations such as The Mists of Avalon
- Morgaine, heroine of The Morgaine Stories by C. J. Cherryh
- Morgaine le Fey (DC Comics), a character inspired by the legendary figure
- Morgaine, a sorceress in the Doctor Who serial Battlefield
- Morgaine, opera by Edmond Dédé (1887)

== See also ==
- Morgan (disambiguation)
- Morgana (disambiguation)
- Morgane (disambiguation)
- Morgan le Fay (disambiguation)
