= Morgan Creek =

Morgan Creek may refer to:

== Streams ==
- Morgan Creek (California), a tributary of Pine Creek in Mono and Inyo counties
- Morgan Creek (Minnesota), a tributary of the Minnesota River in Blue Earth and Brown counties
- Morgan Creek (New Hope River tributary)
- Morgan Creek (Tohickon Creek tributary), a tributary of the Tohickon Creek in Bucks County, Pennsylvania
- Morgan Creek (Tennessee), a tributary of the Duck River in Hickman County

== Other uses ==
- Morgan Creek Entertainment, an American movie studio
