= Morganna (disambiguation) =

Morganna is the most common name of the Kissing Bandit and ecdysiast Morganna Roberts.

Morganna may also refer to:

- Morganna (.hack), an artificial intelligence character in the .hack franchise
- An alternate name for Morgan le Fay

== See also ==
- Morgana (disambiguation)
