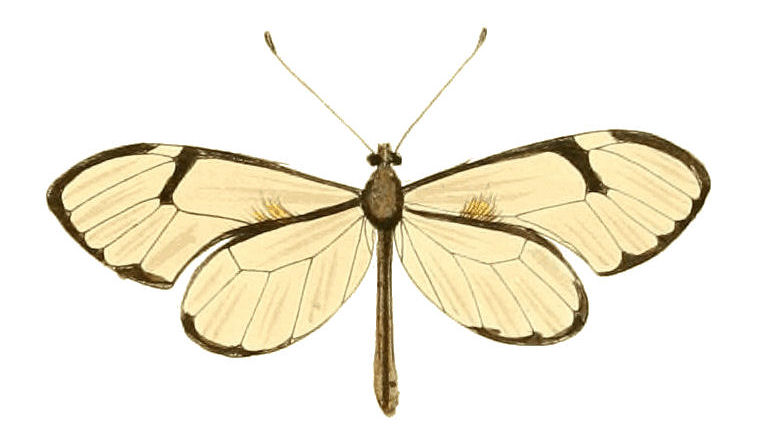

Scientific classification
- Kingdom: Animalia
- Phylum: Arthropoda
- Clade: Pancrustacea
- Class: Insecta
- Order: Lepidoptera
- Family: Nymphalidae
- Genus: Greta
- Species: G. diaphanus

Binomial name
- Greta diaphanus (Drury, 1773)

Synonyms
- Papilio diaphanus Drury, 1773; Heliconia diaphana (Drury, 1773); Papilio unzerina Herbst, 1792; Hymenitis diaphane Hübner, 1816; Hymenitis diaphanus quisqueya Fox, 1963; Greta diaphana charadra Schwartz, 1982; Greta diaphana calimete Schwartz, 1982; Greta diaphana galii Schwartz, 1982

= Greta diaphanus =

Species of butterfly

Greta diaphanus, the Antillean clearwing, is a species of clearwing (ithomiine) butterflies, named by Dru Drury in 1773.

== Description ==
Upperside: antennae black, and very long. thorax and abdomen dark brown. Wings transparent, vitreous (glass like). Anterior ones with the posterior edges bending as it were inwards. A small narrow border of dark brown runs entirely round the edges of these wings; and on the anterior edges, about a third from the tips, runs a dark brown streak towards the middle of the wing, close to which is a small white spot joining to the anterior edge. Posterior wings having also a very narrow border running about two-thirds round them, and stopping at the abdominal edges; some long yellowish hairs are placed on the anterior edges near the body.

Underside: palpi, breast, sides, ash-coloured. The dark brown borders surrounding the wings appear on this side of an orange-brown colour; the rest as on the upperside. Margins of the wings entire.

Wingspan 2 1/4 inches (57 mm).

== Subspecies ==
- Greta diaphanus diaphanus (Jamaica)
- Greta diaphanus quisqueya (Fox, 1963) (Dominican Republic)
