= Saint Sister =

Irish folk music duo

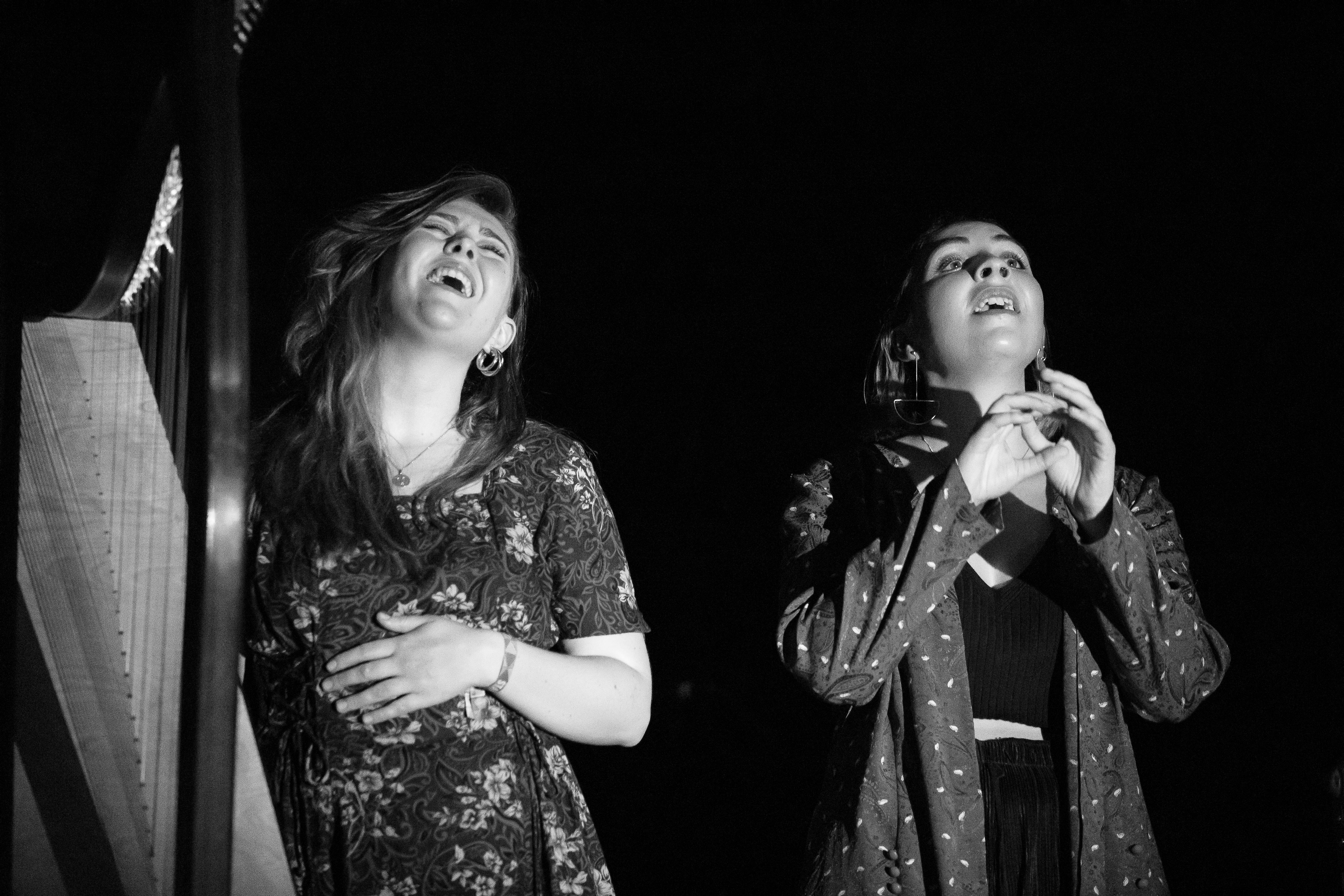
- Saint Sister performing live (2018)

Background information
- Origin: Ireland
- Genres: Irish traditional; folk; Electropop; Folktronica; Celtic fusion
- Years active: 2014–present
- Label: ie too
- Members: Morgan MacIntyre; Gemma Doherty
- Website: saintsisterband.com

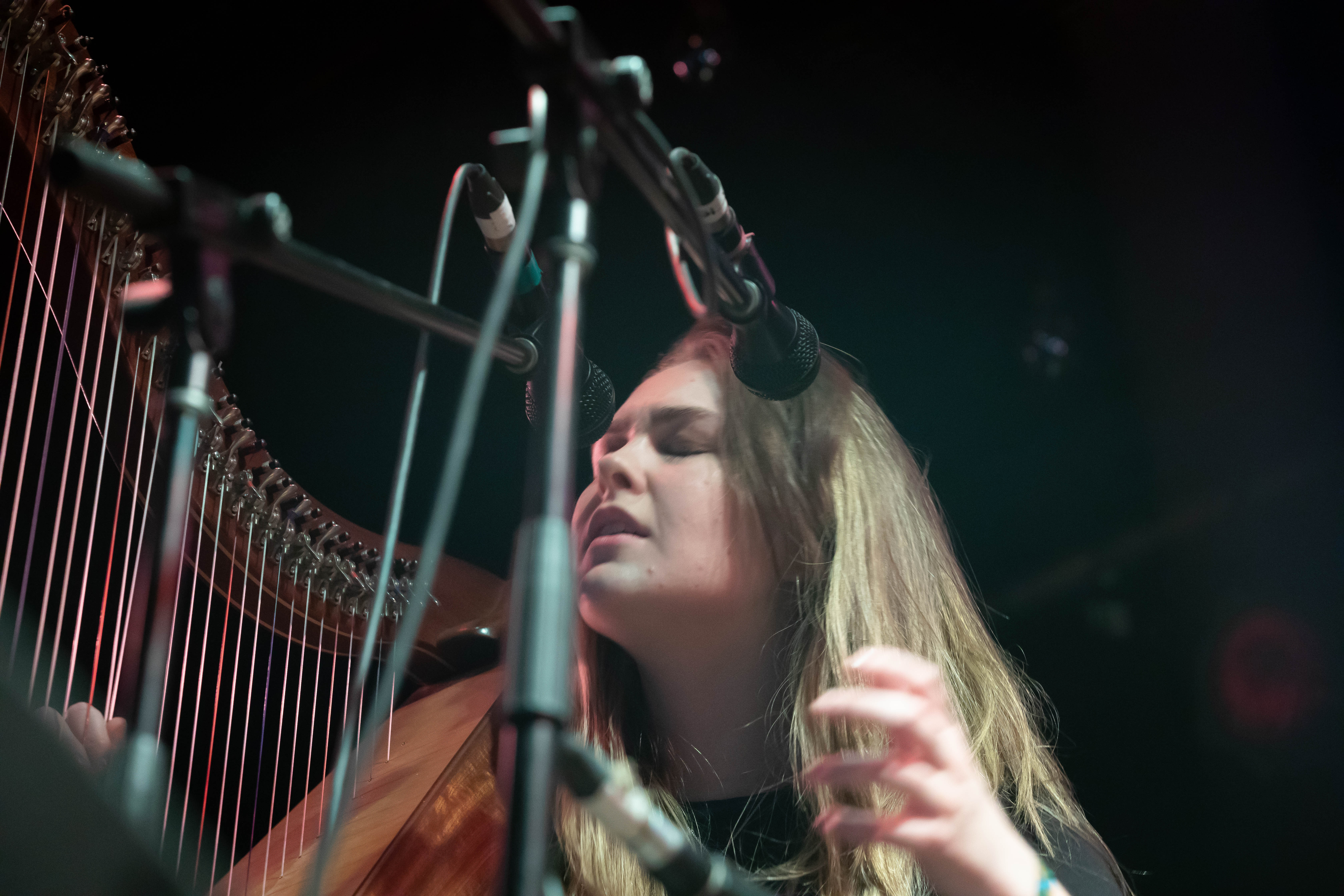
Gemma Doherty in November 2018

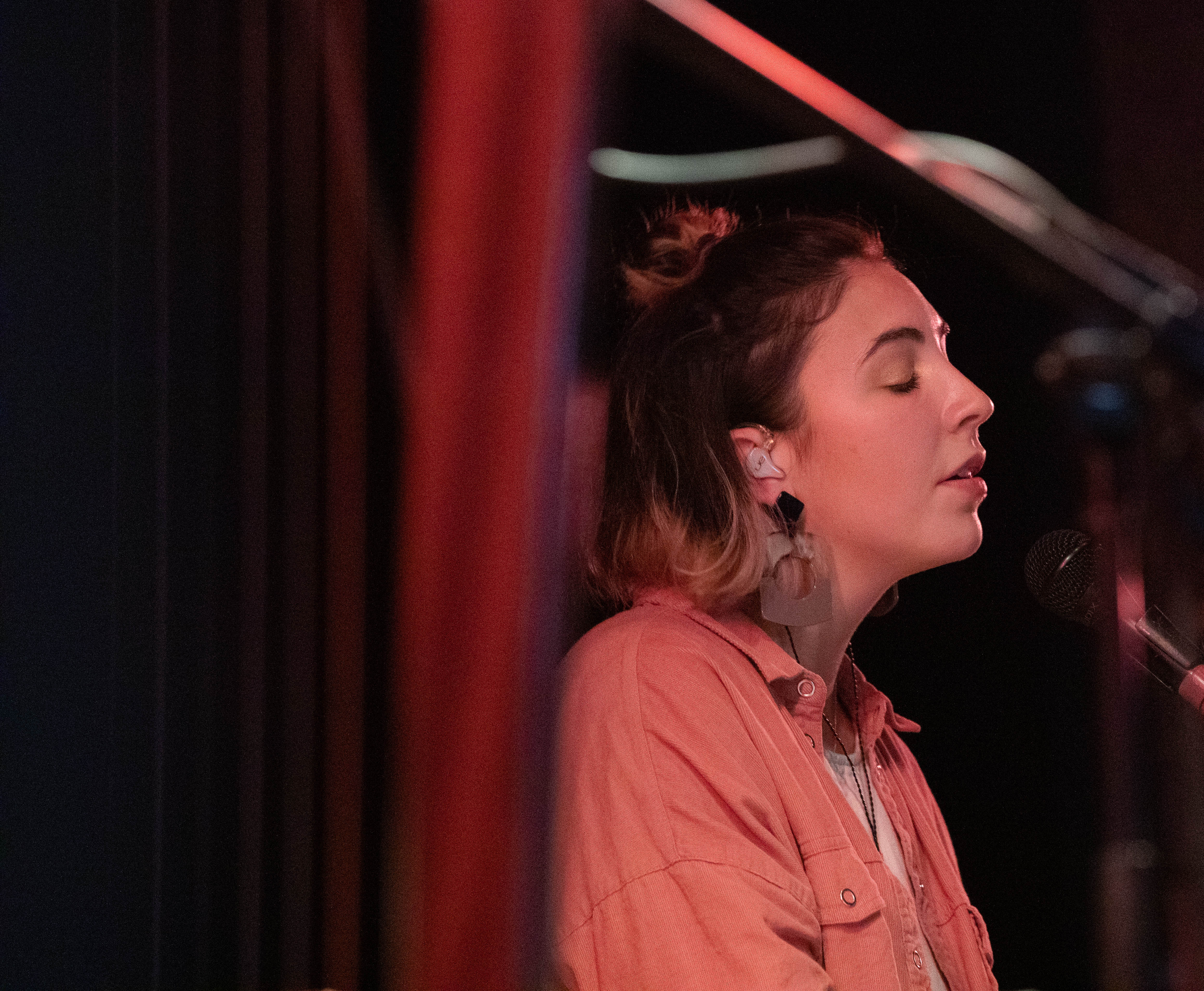
Morgan MacIntyre in November 2018

Saint Sister is an Irish traditional duo, whose music has been described as "atmosfolk."

== Career ==
Morgan MacIntyre (from Belfast) and Gemma Doherty (from Derry) met at Trinity College, Dublin. They founded Saint Sister in 2014. They were voted the “Best Irish Act" by the readers of The Irish Times in 2016. Their debut album, Shape of Silence, was released in 2018 and was nominated for the Choice Music Prize. They performed an a cappella rendition of the song "Dreams" by The Cranberries at Lyra McKee's funeral in Belfast, who was killed by the New IRA in April 2019.

In 2020, the duo were part of an Irish collective of female singers and musicians called Irish Women in Harmony, that recorded a version of the song "Dreams" in aid of the charity Safe Ireland, which deals with domestic abuse which had reportedly risen significantly during the COVID-19 lockdown.

The duo went on indefinite hiatus at the end of 2023. Since then, MacIntyre has launched her own solo project, releasing songs under the name "Morgana".

== Personnel ==
- Morgan MacIntyre (vocals, synths, drum pads)
- Gemma Doherty (vocals, electric harp)

== Discography ==
Albums

- Shape of Silence (2018)
- Where I Should End (2021)

EPs

- Madrid (2015)

Singles

- Tin Man (2016)
- Causing Trouble (2017)
- Is it too early? (Kilmainham) (2019)
- Dynamite (2020)
- The Place That I Work (2021)
- Oh My God Oh Canada (2021)
