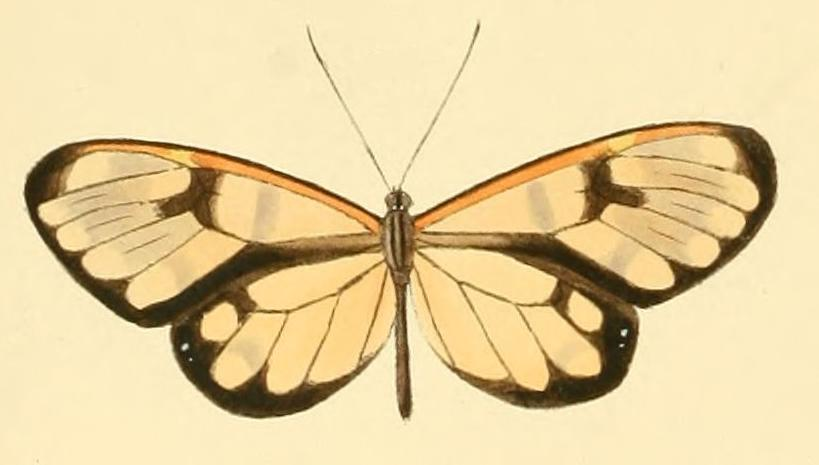

Scientific classification
- Domain: Eukaryota
- Kingdom: Animalia
- Phylum: Arthropoda
- Class: Insecta
- Order: Lepidoptera
- Family: Nymphalidae
- Genus: Greta
- Species: G. theudelinda

Binomial name
- Greta theudelinda (Hewitson, 1861)

Synonyms
- Ithomia theudelinda Hewitson, 1861; Hypomenitis theudelinda; Ithomia zalmunna Hewitson, 1869; Ithomia cyrcilla Hewitson, 1874; Hypomenitis theudelinda bonita Vitale & Bollino, 2001

= Greta theudelinda =

Species of butterfly

Greta theudelinda is a species of butterfly of the family Nymphalidae. It is found in Colombia, Ecuador, Bolivia and Peru.

The wingspan is about 70 millimetres (2.8 in).

== Subspecies ==
- Greta theudelinda theudelinda (Colombia)
- Greta theudelinda zalmunna (Hewitson, 1869) (Ecuador)
- Greta theudelinda cyrcilla (Hewitson, 1874) (Bolivia)
- Greta theudelinda bonita (Vitale & Bollino, 2001) (Ecuador)

There are also three undescribed subspecies from Peru.
