= Morgana =

Morgana may refer to:

== People ==
- Morgana Gmach (born 1994), Brazilian female rhythmic gymnast
- Morgana King (1930–2018), American singer and actress
- Morgana O'Reilly (born 1985), New Zealand actress
- Morgana Robinson (born 1982), British comedian
- Nina Morgana (1891–1986), Italian-American soprano
- Morgana Ignis (born 1989), American actress and writer
- Morgana (musician), Irish singer-songwriter

== Fictional characters ==
- Morgana, an alternative name of Morgan le Fay, a sorceress in the Arthurian legend (a version popular in many modern adaptations)
- Morgana (comics), a DC comics character
- Morgana (The Little Mermaid), a villain of the film The Little Mermaid II: Return to the Sea
- Morgana (Jewel Riders), second season character in Jewel Riders
- Morgana (One Thousand and One Nights), a clever slave-girl from the tale "Ali Baba and the Forty Thieves"
- Morgana (Power Rangers), a villain from Power Rangers: S.P.D.
- Morgana Macawber, a Darkwing Duck character
- Morgana (Persona), a character from the video game Persona 5
- Morgana, a champion in the League of Legends video game
- Morgana (Merlin character), a character in Merlin
- Morgana le Fay, a character in the video game Trollhunters: Tales of Arcadia
- Morgana, character in the Netflix series Cursed
- Morgana, character in the video game The House in Fata Morgana
- Morgana Stradivarius, character from the Brazilian series, Castelo Rá-Tim-Bum
- Morgana Go, character from the Philippine drama TV series Abot-Kamay na Pangarap

== Other uses ==
- Morgana (documentary), a 2019 Australian film about pornographic film star Morgana Muses
- "Morgana" (Jewel Riders episode), episode in Princess Gwenevere and the Jewel Riders
- The Morgana Show, a British television sketch comedy
- Teatro Morgana, former name of Teatro Brancaccio
- Morgana, a 2012 Mexican film

== See also ==
- Fata Morgana (disambiguation)
- Morganna (disambiguation)
- Morgan le Fay (disambiguation)
- Morgaine (disambiguation)
- Morgan (disambiguation)
