= Morganton =

Morganton is the name of some places in the United States of America:

- Morganton, Georgia
- Morganton, North Carolina
- Morganton, Tennessee, former city in East Tennessee, near modern-day Greenback

== See also ==
- Morgantown (disambiguation)
