= Morgane =

Morgane may refer to:

== People ==
- Morgane Dubled (born 1984), French supermodel
- Morgane Patru (born 1998), French foil fencer
- Morgane Tschiember (born 1976), artist
- Morgane (born 1975), Belgian singer

== Other uses ==
- Greta morgane (thick-tipped greta), a butterfly in the family Nymphalidae
- Morgane le Fay, a powerful sorceress in Arthurian legend
- Morgane, a character in the 2018 French-Belgian film Girls With Balls

== See also ==
- Morgan (disambiguation)
- Morgana (disambiguation)
