= Morgan Parker =

Morgan Parker may refer to:

- Morgan Parker (businessman) (born 1974), Australian real estate businessman
- Morgan Parker (writer) (born 1987), American poet, novelist, and editor
- Morgan Parker, inventor of the two-piece scalpel
