= Morgan Park =

Morgan Park may refer to:

- Morgan Park, Baltimore, Maryland
- Morgan Park (Bunker Hill, West Virginia)
- Morgan Park, Chicago, Illinois
  - Two railway stations within the neighborhood:
    - 111th Street/Morgan Park station
    - 115th Street/Morgan Park station
- Morgan Park, Duluth, Minnesota
- Morgan Park, Queensland, a locality in the Southern Downs Region, Australia

== See also ==
- Morgan Parker (disambiguation)
