= Morgan the Pirate (disambiguation) =

Morgan the Pirate may refer to:

- Henry Morgan, 17th century privateer
- Morgan the Pirate (film), 1960 French-Italian film
- Morgan the Pirate (song), 1968 Richard and Mimi Fariña song

== See also ==
- Captain Morgan (disambiguation)
