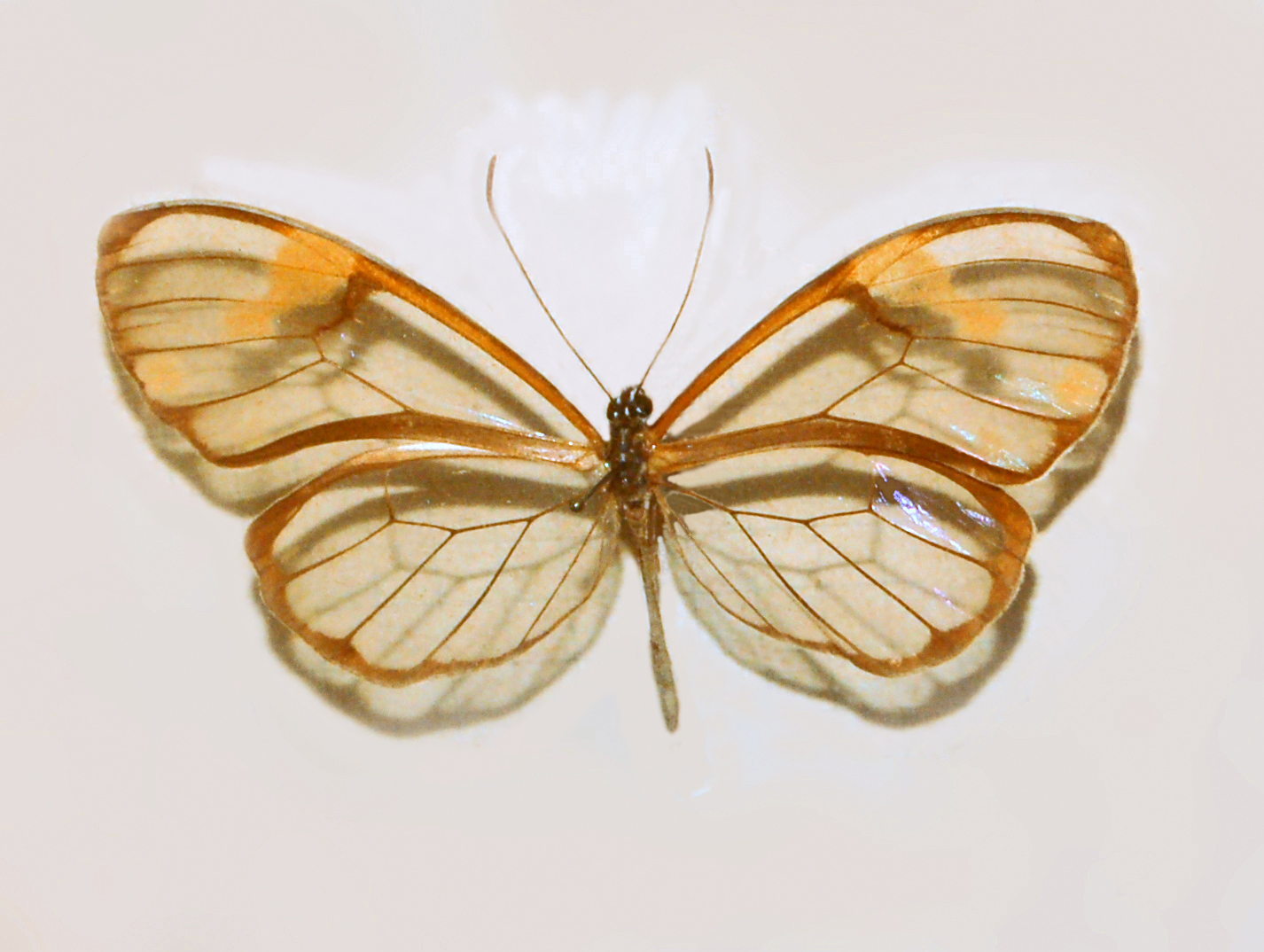
- Specimen from Colombia

Scientific classification
- Domain: Eukaryota
- Kingdom: Animalia
- Phylum: Arthropoda
- Class: Insecta
- Order: Lepidoptera
- Family: Nymphalidae
- Genus: Greta
- Species: G. libethris

Binomial name
- Greta libethris (Felder & Felder, 1867)

= Greta libethris =

Species of butterfly

Greta libethris, the Libethris clearwing, is a day active ithomiine butterfly from the subfamily Ithomiinae.

== Description ==
Greta libethris has a wingspan of about 55–57 millimetres (2.2–2.2 in). Wings are transparent with brown margins and yellow cross bars on the forewings.

== Distribution ==
This species can be found in Venezuela, Bolivia, Colombia and Peru.
