= Morgan le Fay (disambiguation) =

Morgan le Fay is a character in the Arthurian legend.

Morgan le Fay may also refer to:

- Morgan le Fay (Marvel Comics), a Marvel Comics character based on the legendary figure
- Morgaine le Fey (DC Comics), a DC Comics character based on the legendary figure
- Morgan le Fay (painting) an 1864 painting by Frederick Sandys

== See also ==
- Morgana (disambiguation)
- Morgaine (disambiguation)
- Morgana Lefay
- Fata Morgana
