= North Washington Street Historic District (Bloomington, Indiana) =

Historic district in Indiana, United States

- U.S. National Register of Historic Places
- U.S. Historic district
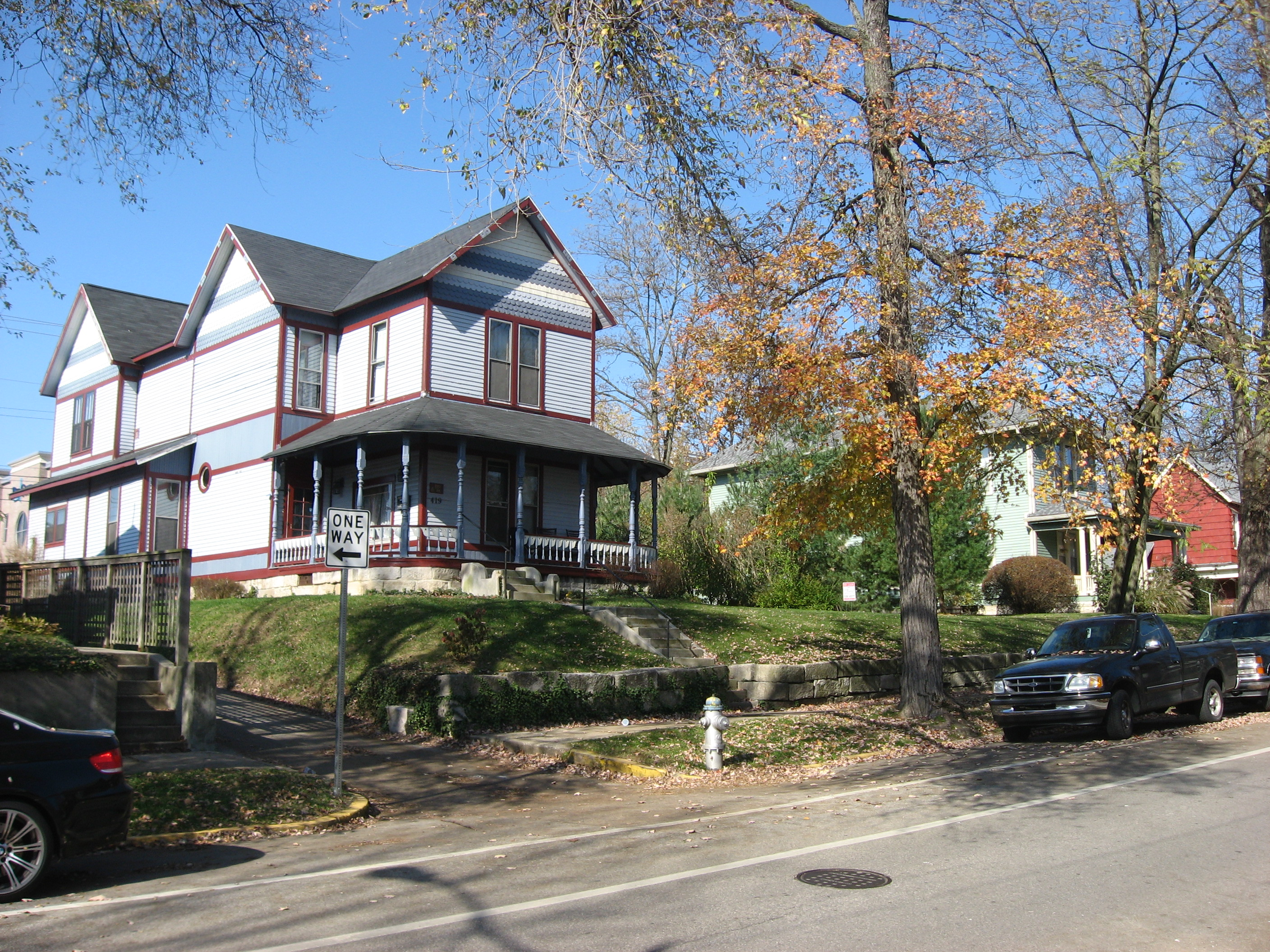
- North Washington Street Historic District, November 2009

- Location within Indiana Location within the United States
- Location: Roughly bounded by E. 10th, E. 8th, N. Walnut and N. Lincoln Sts., Bloomington, Indiana
- Coordinates: 39°10′13″N 86°31′57″W
- Area: 7.5 acres (3.0 ha)
- Architect: Multiple
- Architectural style: Classical Revival, Bungalow/craftsman, Queen Anne
- NRHP reference No.: 91000271
- Added to NRHP: March 14, 1991

North Washington Street Historic District is a national historic district located in Bloomington, Indiana. The district encompasses 35 contributing buildings and six contributing structures in a predominantly residential section of Bloomington. It developed between roughly 1870 and 1929, and includes notable examples of Queen Anne, Classical Revival, and Bungalow/American Craftsman style architecture. Located in the district is the separately listed Morgan House. Other notable buildings include the Showers-Graham House (c. 1905), Showers-Myers House (c. 1900), Teter House (c. 1913), and Washington Terrace Apartments (1929).

It was listed on the National Register of Historic Places in 1991.
