= Morgen (disambiguation) =

Morgen is a former unit of measurement, from the German and Dutch word meaning morning, which denoted the amount of land that could be plowed in a morning's time.

Morgen may also refer to:

== People ==
- Brett Morgen (born 1968), American film director
- Curt von Morgen (1858–1928), Prussian explorer and general
- Georg Konrad Morgen (1909–1982), German judge
- Morgan le Fay, a character in British Arthurian legend, "Morgen" being one of several variant spellings
- Morgen Witzel (born 1960), Canadian historian and business theorist
- Sandra Morgen (1950–2016), American feminist anthropologist

== Media ==
- De Morgen, a Flemish newspaper
- Der Morgen, a former German newspaper
- Morgen (film), a 2010 Romanian film

== Music ==
- Morgen (band), a psychedelic rock band from Long Island, New York
- "Morgen!", an 1894 song by Richard Strauss
- "Morgen" (Ivo Robić song), a 1959 German song
- "Morgen" (Ronnie Tober song), a 1968 Dutch song and Eurovision Song Contest entry

== Other uses ==
- Morgen (mythological creature), a Welsh or Breton water-sprite

== See also ==
- Morgen Freiheit, former Yiddish-language newspaper in New York
- Morgen schon, German television series
- Morgen und Abend, an opera by Georg Friedrich Haas
- Morgan (disambiguation)
