= Morganville =

Morganville may refer to:

== Places ==
=== Australia ===
- Morganville, Queensland

=== Canada ===
- Morganville, Nova Scotia

=== United States of America ===
- Morganville, Georgia
- Morganville, Kansas
- Morganville, New Jersey
- Morganville, New York
- Morganville, Ohio

== Other ==
- Morganville, an earlier name for Shelbyville on The Simpsons
- Morganville, Texas, the setting for the Morganville Vampires novels by Rachel Caine

== See also ==
- Morgansville, West Virginia
