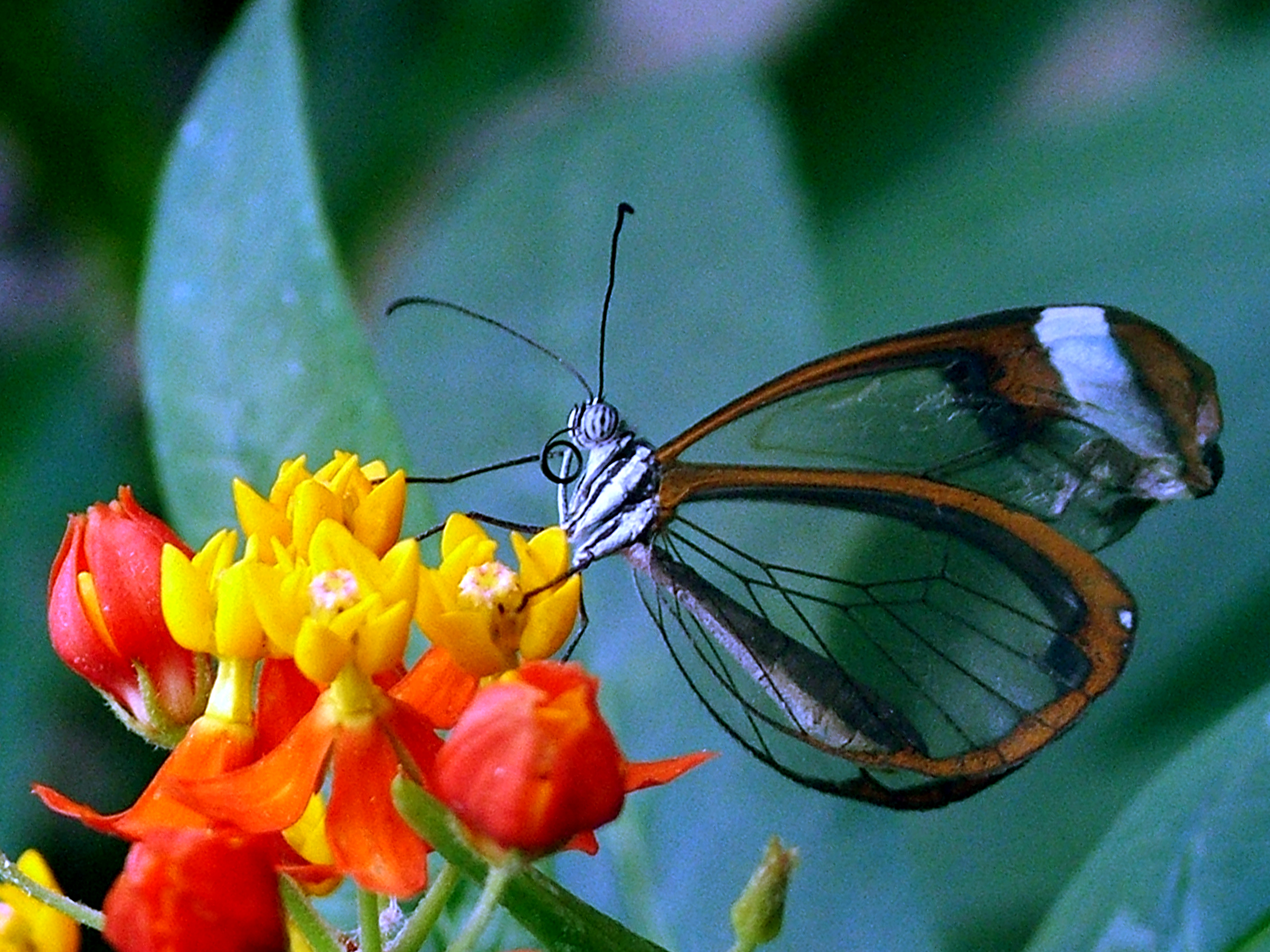
- Greta morgane

Scientific classification
- Kingdom: Animalia
- Phylum: Arthropoda
- Clade: Pancrustacea
- Class: Insecta
- Order: Lepidoptera
- Family: Nymphalidae
- Tribe: Ithomiini
- Genus: Greta; Hemming, 1934

Type species
- Papilio diaphanus (Drury, 1773)

Species
- See text

Synonyms
- Hymenitis Hübner, 1816 non Hymenitis Illiger, 1807 = Mechanitis Fabricius, 1807, a related genus; Hypomenitis Fox, 1945

= Greta (butterfly) =

Genus of brush-footed butterflies

Greta is a genus of clearwing (ithomiine) butterflies, named by Arthur Francis Hemming in 1934. They are in the brush-footed butterfly family, Nymphalidae, and are found in Central America, South America, and the Caribbean.

== Species ==
Arranged alphabetically:

- Greta alphesiboea (Hewitson, 1869)
- Greta andromica (Hewitson, [1854]) – andromica clearwing
- Greta annette (Guérin-Ménéville, [1844]) – white-spotted clearwing
- Greta cubana (Herrich-Schaeffer, 1862) – Cuban clearwing
- Greta clavijoi
- Greta depauperata (Boisduval, 1870)
- Greta dercetis (Doubleday & Hewitson, 1847)
- Greta diaphanus (Drury, [1773]) – Antillean clearwing
- Greta enigma (Haensch, 1905)
- Greta esula (Hewitson, 1855)
- Greta gabiglooris (Brabant & Bischler, 2005) – Gabi's clearwing
- Greta gardneri (Weeks, 1901)
- Greta hermana (Haensch, 1903)
- Greta libethris (C & R Felder, 1867) – Libethris clearwing
- Greta lojana (Vitale & Bollino, 2001)
- Greta lydia (Weymer, 1899)
- Greta morgane (Geyer, 1833) – thick-tipped greta, Morgane clearwing, rusty clearwing
- Greta nero (Hewitson, 1854) – Nero clearwing
- Greta ochretis (Haensch, 1903)
- Greta oneidodes (Kaye, 1918)
- Greta ortygia (Weymer, 1890) – orthygia clearwing
- Greta oto (Hewitson, 1854) – glasswing
- Greta polissena (Hewitson, [1863]) – Polissena clearwing
- Greta telesilla (Weymer, 1899)
- Greta theudelinda (Hewitson, [1861])
