= Morgan House (Bloomington, Indiana) =

Historic house in Indiana, United States

- U.S. National Register of Historic Places
- U.S. Historic district – Contributing property
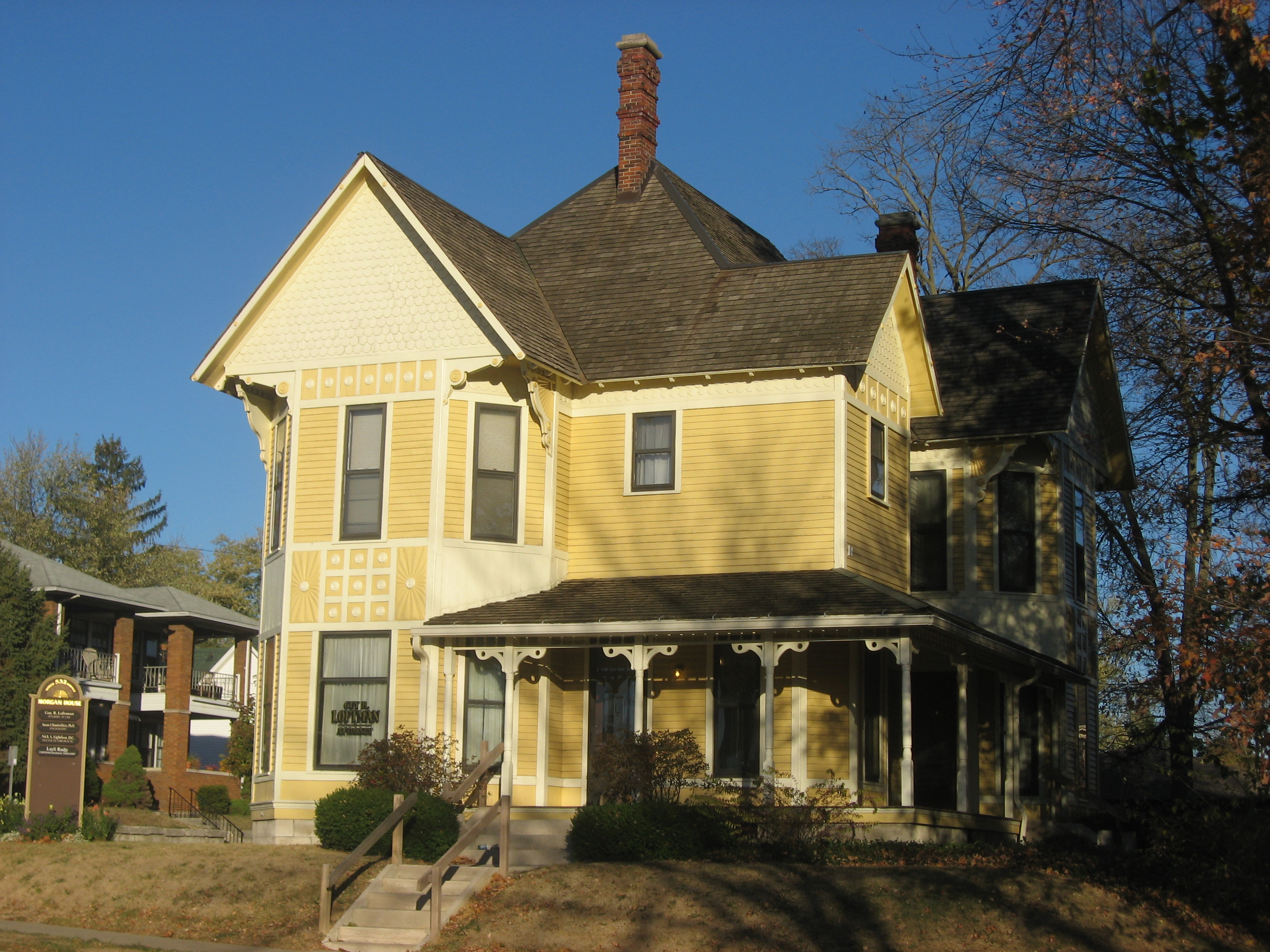
- Front of the house

- Location within Indiana Location within the United States
- Location: 532 N. Walnut St., Bloomington, Indiana
- Coordinates: 39°10′16″N 86°32′0″W
- Area: less than one acre
- Built: 1890
- Architect: Barber, George F.
- Architectural style: Queen Anne
- NRHP reference No.: 83000140
- Added to NRHP: March 3, 1983

Morgan House is a historic home located at Bloomington, Indiana. It was designed by architect George Franklin Barber and built in 1890. It is a two-story, Queen Anne style frame dwelling with an irregular plan. It features a long narrow veranda, two-story polygonal bay, multi-gabled roof, decorative shingles, and four brick chimneys with decorative corbelling.

It was listed on the National Register of Historic Places in 1983. It is located in the North Washington Street Historic District.

== See also ==
- List of George Franklin Barber works
