= Captain Morgan (disambiguation) =

Captain Morgan is a brand of flavored rums.

Captain Morgan may also refer to:

- Frederick E. Morgan (1894–1967), British Army senior officer
- Henry Morgan (c. 1635–1688), Welsh privateer for whom the rum is named
- Miles Morgan (1616–1699), Welsh colonist of America
- Robert Clark Morgan (1798–1864), English sea captain
- Eoin Morgan, England cricket captain (nickname)
- Captain "Axe-Hand" Morgan, minor antagonist from the manga One Piece

== See also ==
- Captain Morgan's Revenge, 2008 studio album by Scottish heavy metal band Alestorm
- Captain Morgan Trophy, Rugby League knock-out trophy for season 1973–74
