= CP Morgan =

CP Morgan was a family-owned homebuilding company, based in the United States. Founded in 1983, its headquarters were in Indianapolis, Indiana, with additional offices in Charlotte, North Carolina and Kernersville, North Carolina.

CP Morgan offered homes that ranged from 1,000 to 5,000 square feet (460 m^{2}), with starting prices of $95,000 - $260,000. The company focused primarily on single-family homes for first time and first time move-up homebuyers.

CP Morgan was recognized as a winner of the National Award for Innovation in Workforce Housing of the National Association of Home Builders and the 2006 Silver Award of the National Housing Quality Awards. CP Morgan was recognized as one of the largest privately owned homebuilders in the United States.

== History ==
The company was founded by Charles P. Morgan in Indianapolis, Indiana in 1983. The company had built more than 24,000 homes in over 150 communities before going out of business in 2009.

The company used the Rayco Model, which uses centralized management systems and buyer-driven concepts to streamline the home building process.

In 2004, the company expanded to Charlotte, North Carolina, and in May 2007, CP Morgan continued their expansion by moving into the Piedmont Triad of North Carolina. Due to economic strain, CP Morgan pulled out of the triad effective November 19, 2008.

In 2009, the company announced that it would be going out of business, citing the poor housing market as the reason why. Operations ceased February 27, 2009. Homeowners were serviced by their ongoing homeowners' New Home Warranties.
