= Morgantown =

Morgantown is the name of several places in the United States of America:

== Places ==
- Morgantown, Indiana, a town
- Morgantown, Kentucky, a city
- Morgantown, Maryland, an unincorporated community
- Morgantown, Adams County, Mississippi, a census-designated place
- Morgantown, Marion County, Mississippi, an unincorporated community
- Morgantown, Oktibbeha County, Mississippi, an unincorporated community
- Morgantown, Burlington, North Carolina, a neighborhood
- Morgantown, Ohio, an unincorporated community
- Morgantown, Pennsylvania, a census-designated place
- Morgantown, West Virginia, a city; the largest Morgantown

== Roads ==
- Morgantown Expressway

== See also ==
- Morgantown Historic District (disambiguation)
