= Morgan High School =

Morgan High School may refer to:

== United States ==
- West Morgan High School, in Trinity, Alabama
- The Morgan School, in Clinton, Connecticut; in the Shoreline Conference
- Fort Morgan High School, in Fort Morgan, Colorado
- Morgan County High School, in Madison, Georgia; Morgan County School District
- Morgan Park High School, in Chicago, Illinois
- Morgan Township Middle-High School, in Valparaiso, Indiana
- Morgan County High School, in West Liberty, Kentucky
- Morgan City High School, in Morgan City, Louisiana
- Morgan County R-I High School, in Morgan County, Missouri
- Morgan County R-II High School, in Morgan County, Missouri
- Morgan High School (McConnelsville, Ohio), in McConnelsville, Ohio)
- Jefferson-Morgan Middle/Senior High School, in Jefferson, Pennsylvania
- Morgan High School (Texas), in Morgan, Texas
- Morgan High School (Utah), in Morgan, Utah

== Elsewhere ==
- Morgan Girls High School, Narayanganj, Bangladesh
- Morgan High School Harare, in Harare, Zimbabwe
