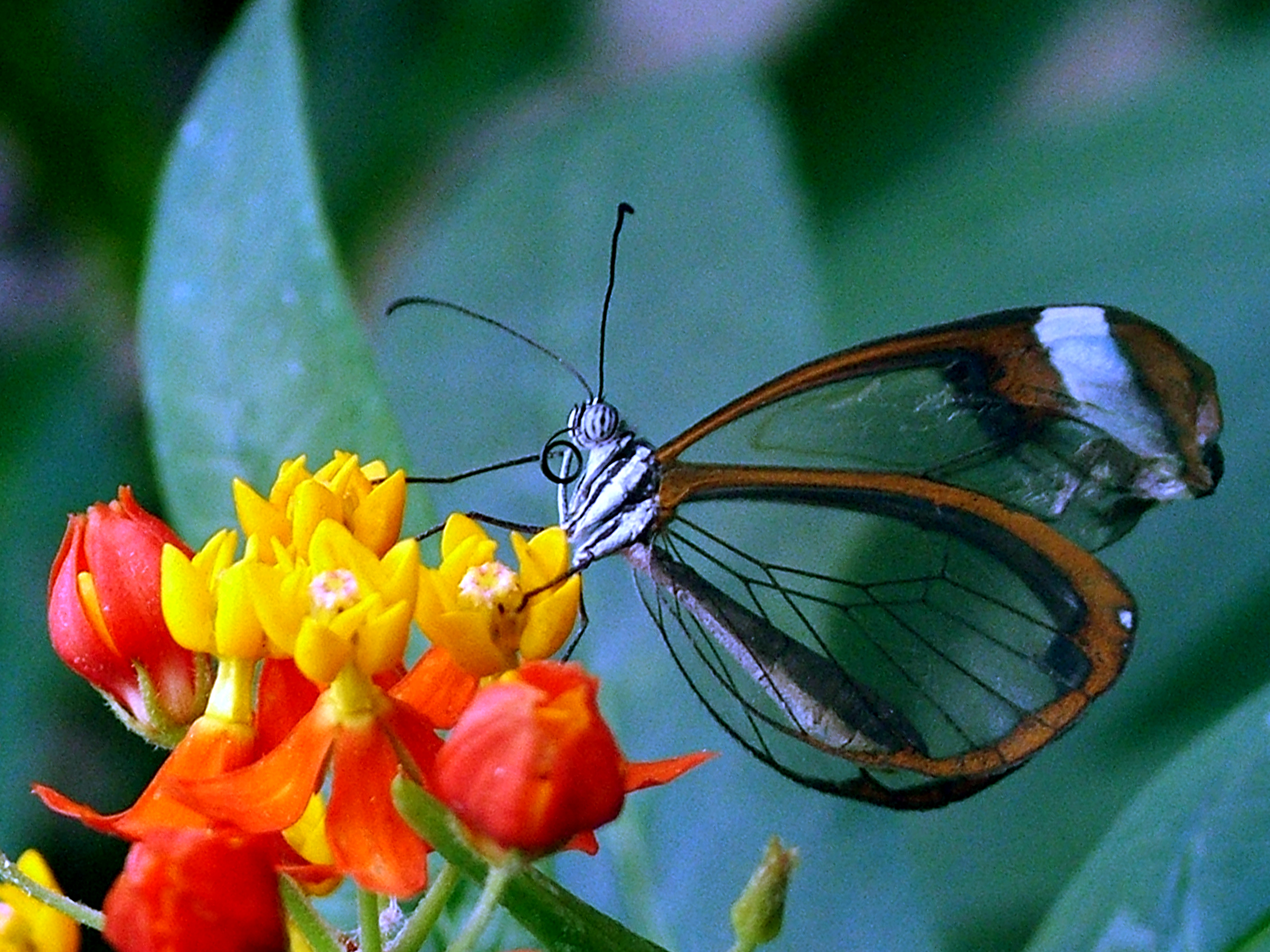

Scientific classification
- Kingdom: Animalia
- Phylum: Arthropoda
- Clade: Pancrustacea
- Class: Insecta
- Order: Lepidoptera
- Family: Nymphalidae
- Genus: Greta
- Species: G. morgane

Binomial name
- Greta morgane Geyer, 1833

= Greta morgane =

Species of butterfly

Greta morgane, the thick-tipped greta, is a day active ithomiine butterfly from the subfamily Ithomiinae. The length of the wings of this clearwing butterfly range from 56 to 58 mm. It is a common butterfly in Mexico, Middle-America, and the Caribbean.
