= Morgan Bridge =

Morgan Bridge may refer to:

- Morgan Bridge (Old Peru, Iowa)
- Morgan Covered Bridge in Belvidere, Vermont
- Murray Morgan Bridge in Tacoma, Washington
- David Morgan Memorial Bridge in Fairmont, West Virginia
