= Morgan Creek (Minnesota) =

Stream in Minnesota, U.S.

Coordinates: 44°14′47″N 94°19′20″W

Morgan Creek is a stream in Blue Earth County, Minnesota and Brown County, Minnesota, in the United States. It is a tributary of the Minnesota River.

Morgan Creek was probably named for Richard Morgan, a pioneer who settled there.

== See also ==
- List of rivers of Minnesota
