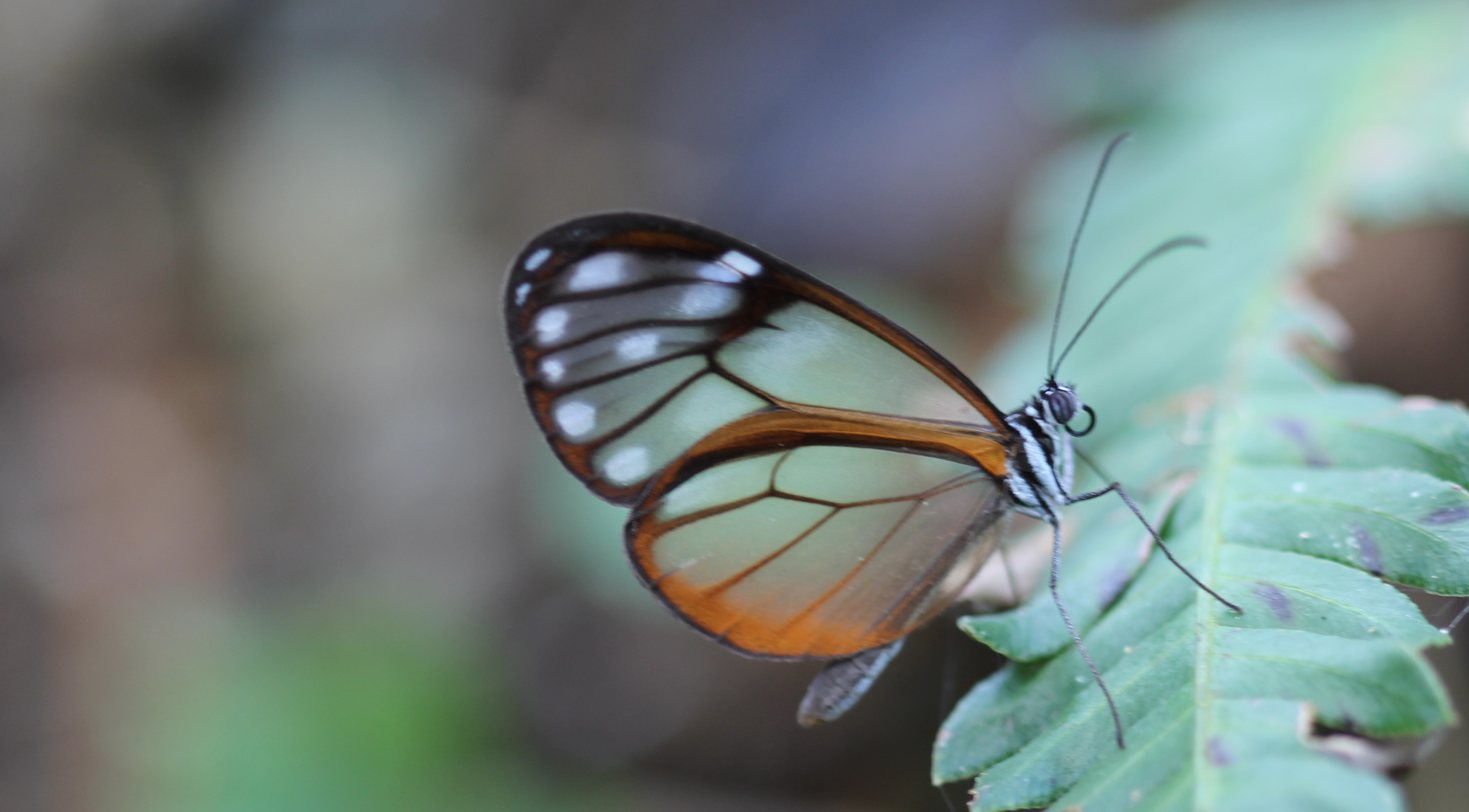
- Specimen from Colombia

Scientific classification
- Kingdom: Animalia
- Phylum: Arthropoda
- Class: Insecta
- Order: Lepidoptera
- Family: Nymphalidae
- Genus: Greta
- Species: G. andromica

Binomial name
- Greta andromica (Hewitson, 1854)

Synonyms
- Ithomia andromica Hewitson, 1855; Ithomia lyra Salvin, 1869; Hymenitis andania Hopffer, 1874; Hymenitis lyrina Haensch, 1903; Hymenitis nerina Haensch, 1905; Hymenitis andromica dromica Haensch, 1910

= Greta andromica =

Species of butterfly

Greta andromica, the Andromica clearwing, is an ithomiine butterfly from the subfamily Ithomiinae. It was described by William Chapman Hewitson in 1854.

== Subspecies ==
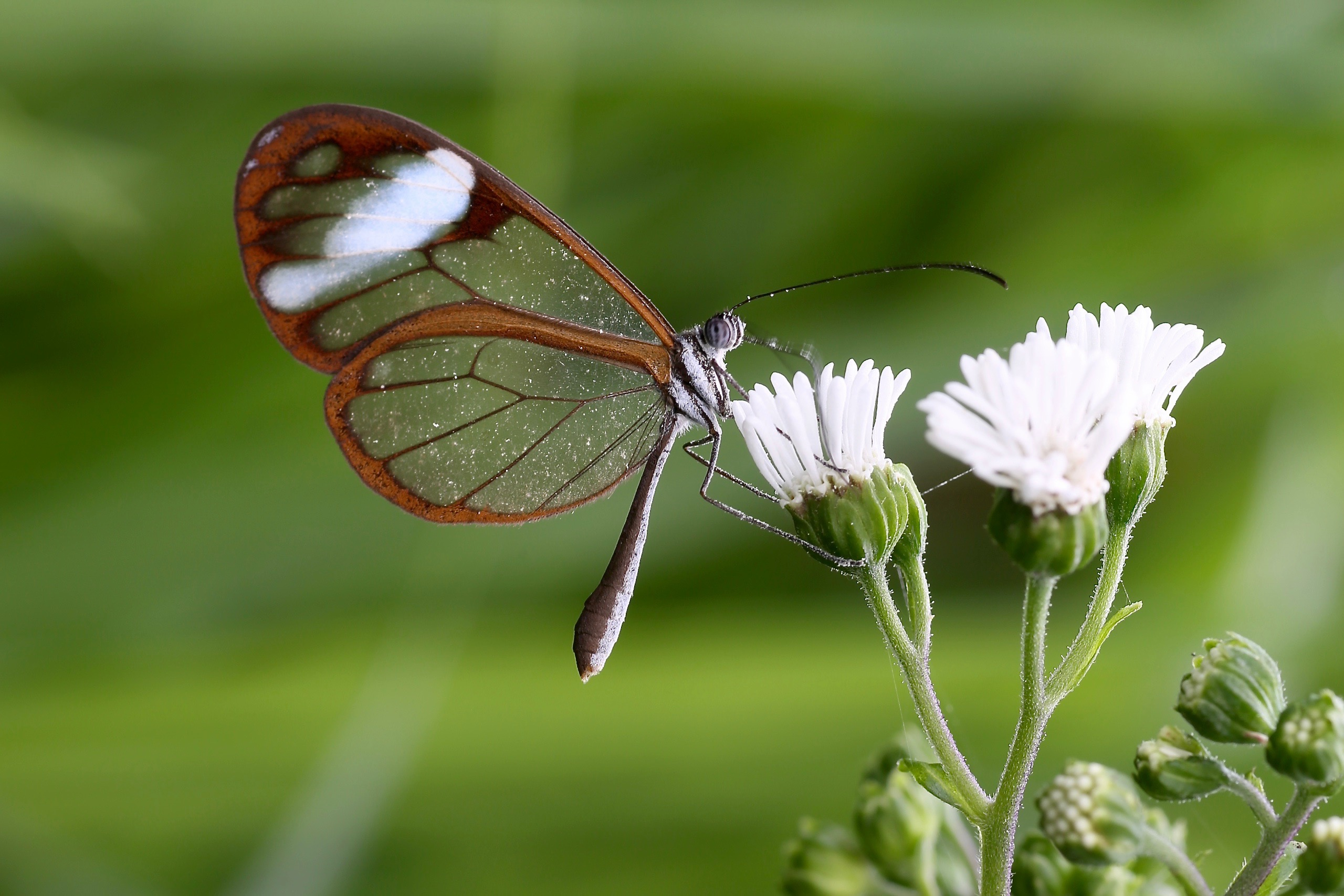
Greta andromica from Ecuador

- Greta andromica andromica (Venezuela)
- Greta andromica andania Hopffer, 1874 (Ecuador, Peru)
- Greta andromica dromica Haensch, 1909 (Colombia)
- Greta andromica lyra Salvin, 1869 (Guatemala to Panama)
- Greta andromica nerina (Haensch, 1905) (Colombia)
- Greta andromica trifenestra Fox, 1941 (Trinidad)
