= George Pinkney Morgan House =

Historic house in West Virginia, United States

- U.S. National Register of Historic Places
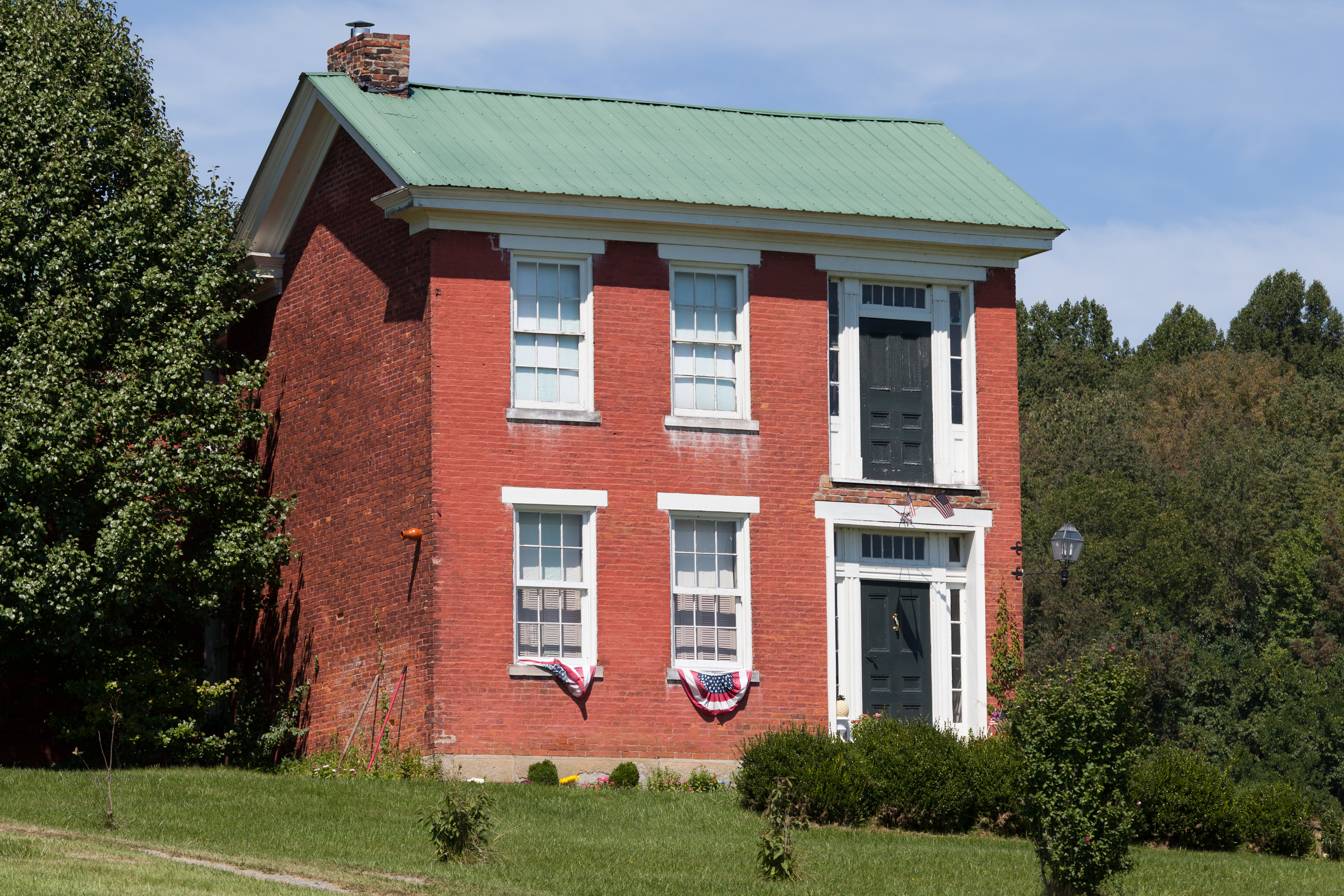

- Location within West Virginia Location within the United States
- Nearest city: County Route 19/3, Rivesville, West Virginia
- Coordinates: 39°32′1″N 80°5′42″W
- Area: 2 acres (0.81 ha)
- Built: 1857-1860
- Architectural style: Greek Revival
- NRHP reference No.: 03000348
- Added to NRHP: May 1, 2003

George Pinkney Morgan House, also known as David Morgan Homeplace, is a historic home located at Rivesville, Marion County, West Virginia. It was built between 1857 and 1860, and is a two-story, red brick farmhouse in the Greek Revival style.

== Description ==
The George Pinkney Morgan House is a brick farmhouse in the Greek Revival style erected c. 1857–60. The two-story, red brick structure contains 10 rooms and as is typical of many houses built in the 19" century, incorporates a rear ell housing the kitchen, backstairs, and a servants bedroom or storeroom. The brick used in its construction was hand molded. The clay for the brick was obtained from a bank in front of, and slightly to the northeast of, the house. The walls are of masonry construction and appear to be three courses thick on the first story and two courses on the second story. This change in the masonry can be seen on the interior, along the main staircase wall, where it creates a wide ridge at the level of the landing. The building is supported by a foundation of two rows of rectangular, tooled stone creating a strong architectural and stylistic base for the brick laid above.

=== Cemetery ===
The Morgan Family Cemetery resides about 500 feet northeast of the house. A post and rail fence with a swing gate currently surrounds the graves. The rectangular site is approximately 60 feet by 50 feet with the larger length running parallel to the current road. A stately evergreen marks the southwest corner of the enclosure. Contained within are the remains of the original settlers of this property, Sarah and David Morgan. Their graves are the earliest extant stones, dating from 1799 and 1813 respectively. Other family members reside within the cemetery. Of particular interest is the grave of George Pinkney Morgan, the owner of the property at the time of the house's construction. His stone is inscribed with the following, "Sacred to the memory George Morgan who died in Camp Chase Dec 30, 1861 aged 41 years." It may be that his body does not reside at this location due to his death in a Confederate prison camp in the early years of the war. However, his name does not appear in the record of Confederate dead buried at Camp Chase, Ohio, leading one to suppose a family member claimed his body. In any case, the children and grandchildren of David Morgan reside in this cemetery, as do the children of George P. Morgan.

== History ==
=== Early Morgan family settlement (1720 - 1849) ===
The property originates from land acquired by David Morgan in the 1760s. According to his son Stephen Morgan (1761 - 1849), David defeated 9 Native Americans in single combat various times, and participated in several raids on Indian villages. Along with his brother Zackquill Morgan, David served in the Virginia forces. David served during the Braddock Expedition, along with the Forbes Expedition.

During the late 1700s, David was involved with a dispute between two Native Americans on his Rivesville farm. Morgan spotted two natives approaching his children, and managed to lead them away while the children fled to Prickett's Fort. The story was first covered in the United States Magazine, reported by Hugh Henry Brackenridge. David was memorialized when a monument dedicated to him was placed on the grave of one of the natives. David Morgan later served several terms as justice of the peace of Monongalia County. He later moved his family to Fairmont, and died in 1813.

David's brother Zackwell served in the American Revolutionary War. He served in the battles of Saratoga. Following the war, he founded two towns, Pleasantville (now Rivesville), and Morgantown.

=== Civil war (1820 - 1865) ===
George P. Morgan (1820 - 1861), a farmer, miner, inventor, and slave owner began construction of his house in 1857 and it was completed between 1857 and 1860. His house was being built at the same time as 3 other relatives, Albert Morgan, Henry Morgan, and John Morgan. At the time of the American Civil war, the Morgan family considered themselves to be Confederates. George served in the war, but was caught in a skirmish at Camp Bartow, and extradited to Camp Chase, Ohio. He died at the camp in 1861.

Following his death, George's wife Catherine Neeson completed the house. She lived with her 3 children, none of whom were ever married. However, they did adopt a young boy, Walter Curnutte, who lived there until his death in 1975.

=== Restoration and NRHP listing ===
In 1999, Jim Rote purchased the house and renovated it for 13 years.

It was listed on the National Register of Historic Places in 2003.
