= Morgan Township =

Morgan Township may refer to:

== Arkansas ==
- Morgan Township, Cleburne County, Arkansas, in Cleburne County, Arkansas
- Morgan Township, Franklin County, Arkansas, in Franklin County, Arkansas
- Morgan Township, Lawrence County, Arkansas, in Lawrence County, Arkansas
- Morgan Township, Sharp County, Arkansas, in Sharp County, Arkansas

== Illinois ==
- Morgan Township, Coles County, Illinois

== Indiana ==
- Morgan Township, Harrison County, Indiana
- Morgan Township, Owen County, Indiana
- Morgan Township, Porter County, Indiana

== Iowa ==
- Morgan Township, Crawford County, Iowa
- Morgan Township, Decatur County, Iowa
- Morgan Township, Franklin County, Iowa
- Morgan Township, Harrison County, Iowa
- Morgan Township, Woodbury County, Iowa

== Kansas ==
- Morgan Township, Thomas County, Kansas, in Thomas County, Kansas

== Minnesota ==
- Morgan Township, Redwood County, Minnesota

== Missouri ==
- Morgan Township, Mercer County, Missouri

== North Carolina ==
- Morgan Township, Rowan County, North Carolina
- Morgan Township, Rutherford County, North Carolina, in Rutherford County, North Carolina

== North Dakota ==
- Morgan Township, Traill County, North Dakota, in Traill County, North Dakota

== Ohio ==
- Morgan Township, Ashtabula County, Ohio
- Morgan Township, Butler County, Ohio
- Morgan Township, Gallia County, Ohio
- Morgan Township, Knox County, Ohio
- Morgan Township, Morgan County, Ohio
- Morgan Township, Scioto County, Ohio

== Pennsylvania ==
- Morgan Township, Pennsylvania

== South Dakota ==
- Morgan Township, Jones County, South Dakota, in Jones County, South Dakota
