= Morgantown Historic District =

Morgantown Historic District may refer to:

- Morgantown Historic District (Morgantown, Indiana), in Morgan County, Indiana
- Morgantown Historic District (Morgantown, Pennsylvania), in Berks County, Pennsylvania
- Morgantown Historic District (Marshall, Virginia), in Fauquier County, Virginia
- Downtown Morgantown Historic District, in Monongalia County, West Virginia
