= Morgan Parker (businessman) =

Australian businessman

Morgan Parker OAM
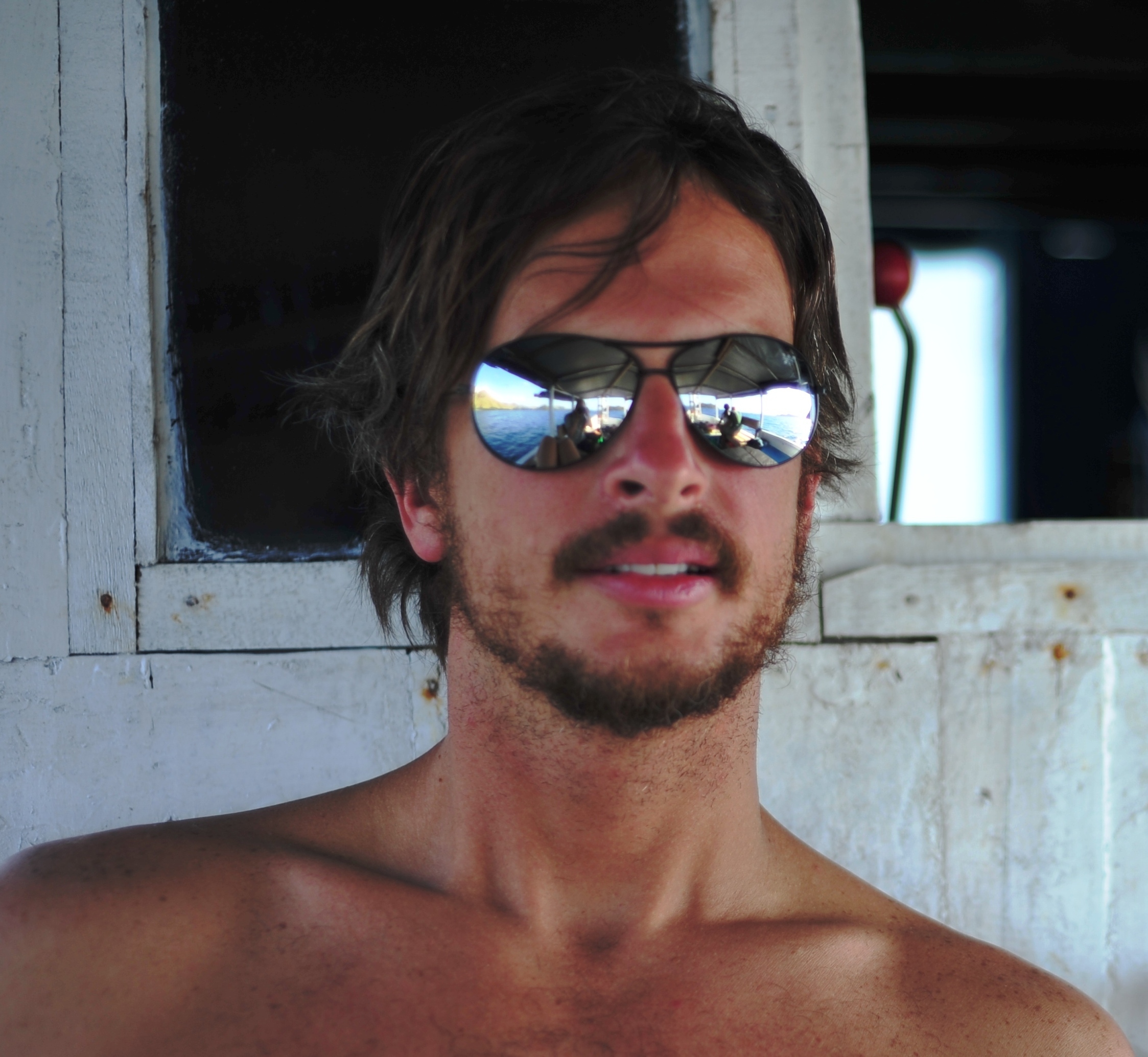
- Morgan Parker in 2011
- Born: Morgan Benn Parker; 1974 (age 51–52)
- Citizenship: Australia
- Occupations: real estate executive and philanthropic adventurer
- Television: Wheel 2 Wheel (television series}www.wheel2wheel.tv
- Children: 2

Morgan Benn Parker OAM (born 1974) is an Australian real estate executive and philanthropic adventurer who founded the non-profit organization Wheel2Wheel. He was COO at Dubai Holding He is the former CEO of Rose Rock Group, a private equity firm established by the Rockefeller family, and former president of Taubman Asia, a unit of The Taubman Company LLC.

In the 2024 Australia Day Honours, Parker received the Medal of the Order of Australia (OAM) "for service to business."

== Biography ==
Morgan Parker grew up in Brisbane, Australia. He attended Brisbane Boys' College. He was subsequently awarded a scholarship to study law at Bond University and completed his degree in 1994 at 19 years of age.

Parker's career started on Australia's Sunshine Coast in the midst of the economic expansionism of the mid-1990s. Parker worked in senior management positions with Macquarie Bank, Lend Lease, Morgan Stanley, Taubman Centers and Rock Rose across Asia.

In 2009, Parker founded the non-profit organization Wheel2Wheel to raise awareness and money throughout the Asia-Pacific by researching humanitarian issues and charities, stages expeditions and produces documentary television series. He rode a motorcycle from Hong Kong to Brisbane, visiting ten charities 25,000 kilometers apart in 125 days.

== Personal life ==
Parker has a son and a daughter.
