= David Morgan House =

Historic house in Utah, United States

- U.S. National Register of Historic Places
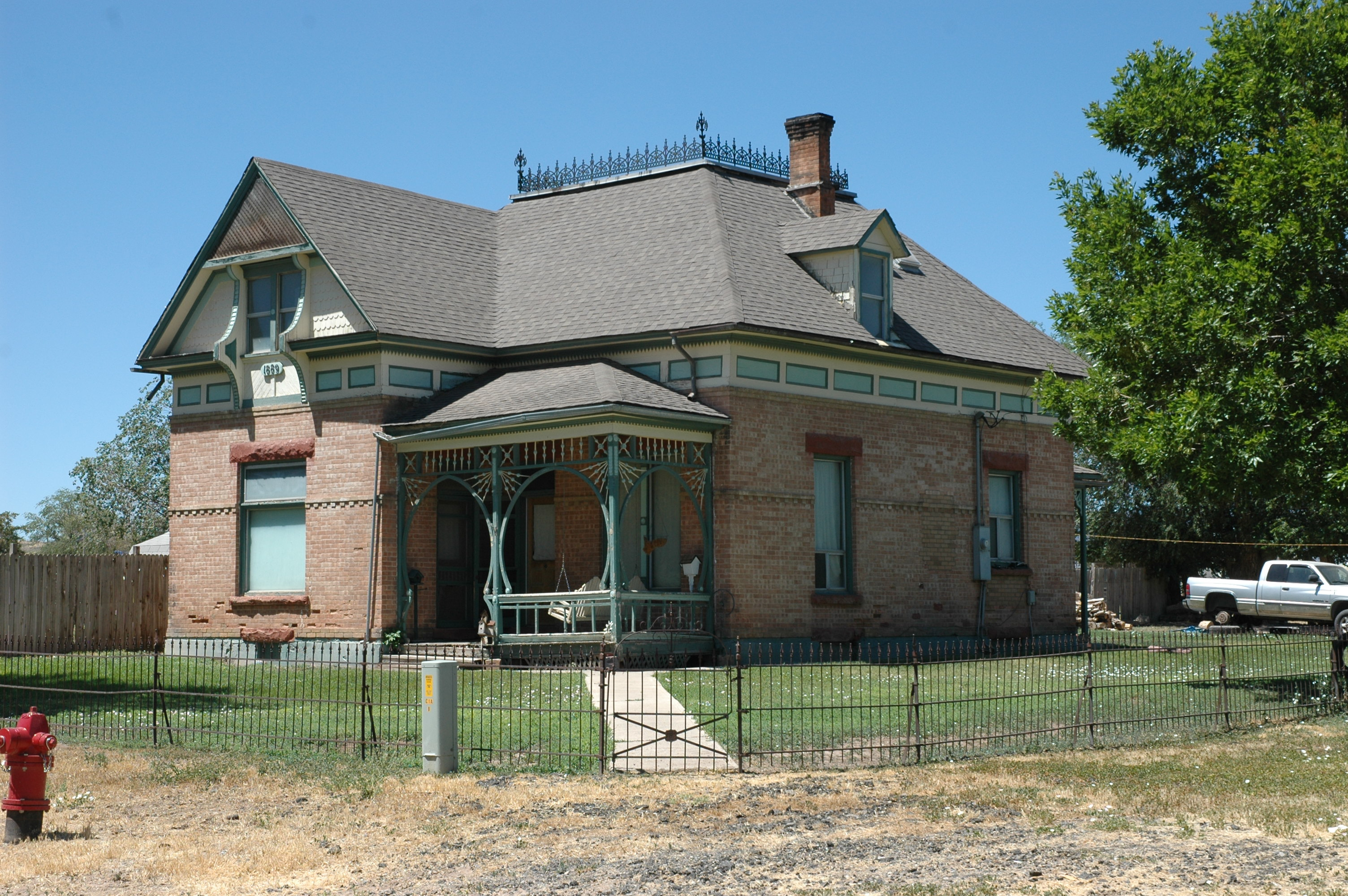

- Location within Utah Location within the United States
- Location: Center St. & 200 South, Goshen, Utah
- Coordinates: 39°56′54″N 111°54′1″W
- Area: 0.31 acres (0.13 ha)
- Built: 1897
- Architect: Albert Pettis
- Architectural style: Second Empire
- NRHP reference No.: 82004167
- Added to NRHP: February 19, 1982

The David Morgan House is a historic house located at Center Street and 200 South in Goshen, Utah.

== Description and history ==
The 1 1/2-story, brick, Second Empire style house was constructed in 1897, and was apparently built to a pattern book design. In fact, it is the only instance of this particular design method in the state of Utah.

It was listed on the National Register of Historic Places on February 19, 1982.
