= Morgan Creek (Tennessee) =

Stream in Hickman County, Tennessee, U.S.

Coordinates: 35.7970117°N 87.3777903°W

Morgan Creek is a stream in Hickman County, Tennessee, in the United States. It is a tributary of Duck River.

Morgan Creek was named for a pioneer who settled near its banks in 1815.

== See also ==
- List of rivers of Tennessee
