= Morgana (musician) =

Irish musician

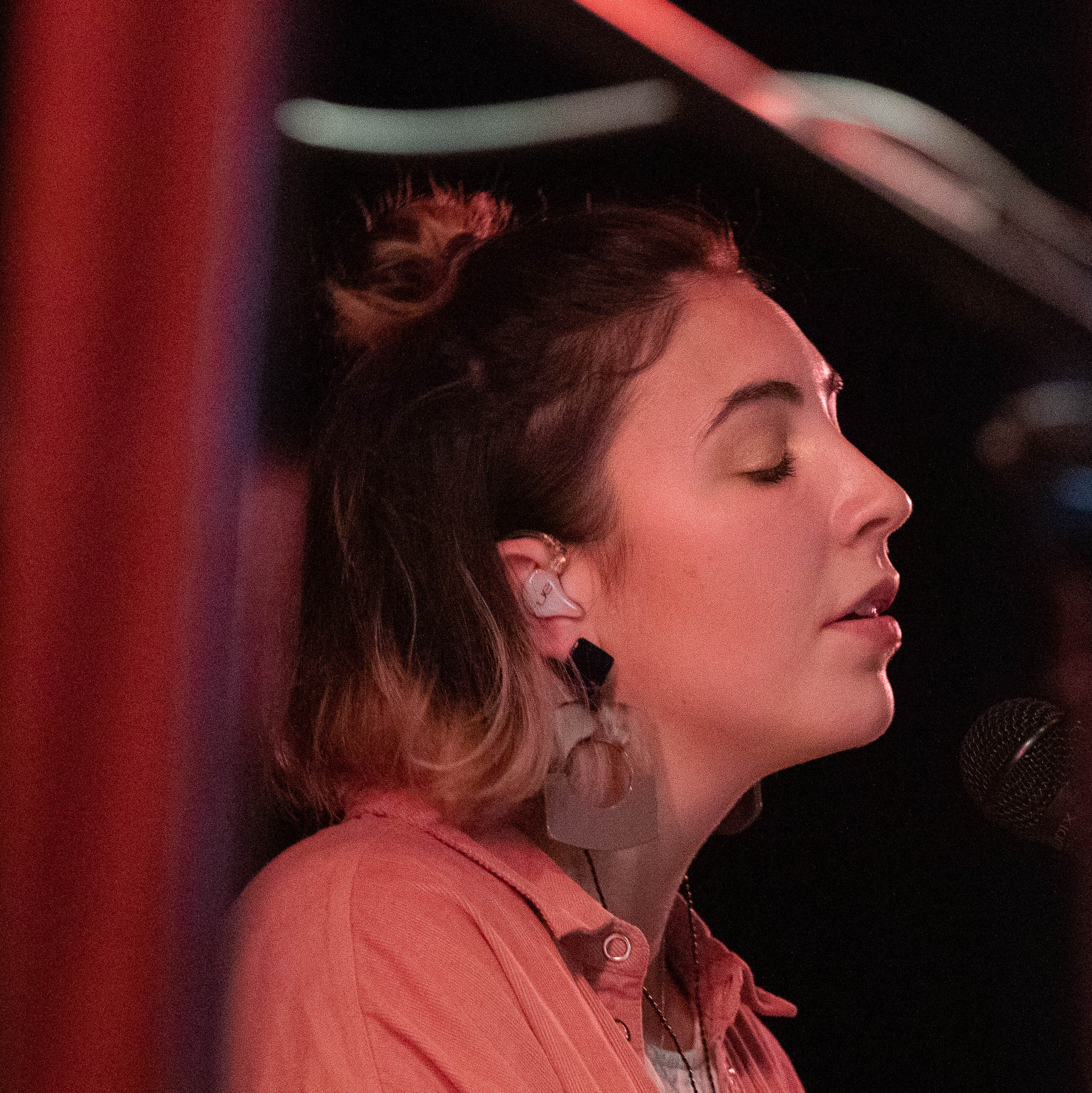

Background information
- Born: Morgan MacIntyre; Belfast, Northern Ireland
- Years active: 2012–present
- Website: morgana.ie

Morgan MacIntyre, known professionally as Morgana, is an Irish singer-songwriter. She was formerly a member of the folk duo Saint Sister, alongside Gemma Doherty.

== Early life ==
MacIntyre spent the first six years of her life in Belfast, before moving to the Gaeltacht in Donegal where her parents had bought a pub.

Her father is Catholic and from the Republic of Ireland, whereas her mother is Protestant and from Northern Ireland. Her mother's great-grandmother and great-grandfather were fluent in both Irish and English, according to the census.

In the five years she spent in Donegal she was raised through Irish, however after returning to Belfast she lost her fluency of the language.

She later moved to Dublin for college.

== Career ==
=== Early career ===
After early praise from Joan Armatrading and Gary Lightbody, she began her musical career as part of the dream folk duo Saint Sister, which she formed with Gemma Doherty in November 2014; the pair met as students in Trinity College Dublin.

== Discography ==
=== Albums ===
- The Whole Thing Was Very Very Emotional (2026)

=== Singles ===
- "I'll Cry When I'm Dead" (2024)
- "Power Cuts" (2025)
- "Party Killer" (2025)
- "I'm Not Going Anywhere" (2025)
- "Fix Your Heart for Free" (2026)
- "Sidekick" (2026)
