= Fort Morgan =

Fort Morgan can apply to any one of several places in the United States:

- Fort Morgan (Alabama), a fort at the mouth of Mobile Bay
- Fort Morgan, Alabama, a nearby community
- Fort Morgan (Colorado), a frontier military post located in present-day Fort Morgan, Colorado
- Fort Morgan, Colorado, a city located in Morgan County
