= Morgan Run =

Morgan Run may refer to:

- Morgan Run, Ohio, an unincorporated community
- Morgan Run (Youghiogheny River tributary), a stream in Fayette County, Pennsylvania
- Morgan Run Natural Environment Area, a protected area in Maryland
