= Morgan City =

Morgan City is the name of some places in the United States of America:

- Morgan City, Alabama
- Morgan City, Louisiana
- Morgan City, Mississippi

== Ship ==
- Morgan City (US Navy) was a US Navy transport, which sank off Kobe in 1899.
