= Morgan Hill (disambiguation) =

Morgan Hill, California is a city in Santa Clara County.

Morgan Hill may also refer to the following places in the United States:

- Morgan Hill (New York), a mountain in Onondaga and Cortland counties, New York
- Morgan Hill (Pennsylvania), a hill in Northampton County
- Morgan Hill, Pennsylvania, a census-designated place in Northampton County
- Morgan Hill Farm, a historic home in Calvert County, Maryland
- Morgan Hill station, a Caltrain station in Morgan Hill, California
- Morgan Hill State Forest, in Onondaga and Cortland counties, New York

== See also ==
- Morgan's Hill, Wiltshire, England
