= Morgan House (Willcox, Arizona) =

- U.S. National Register of Historic Places
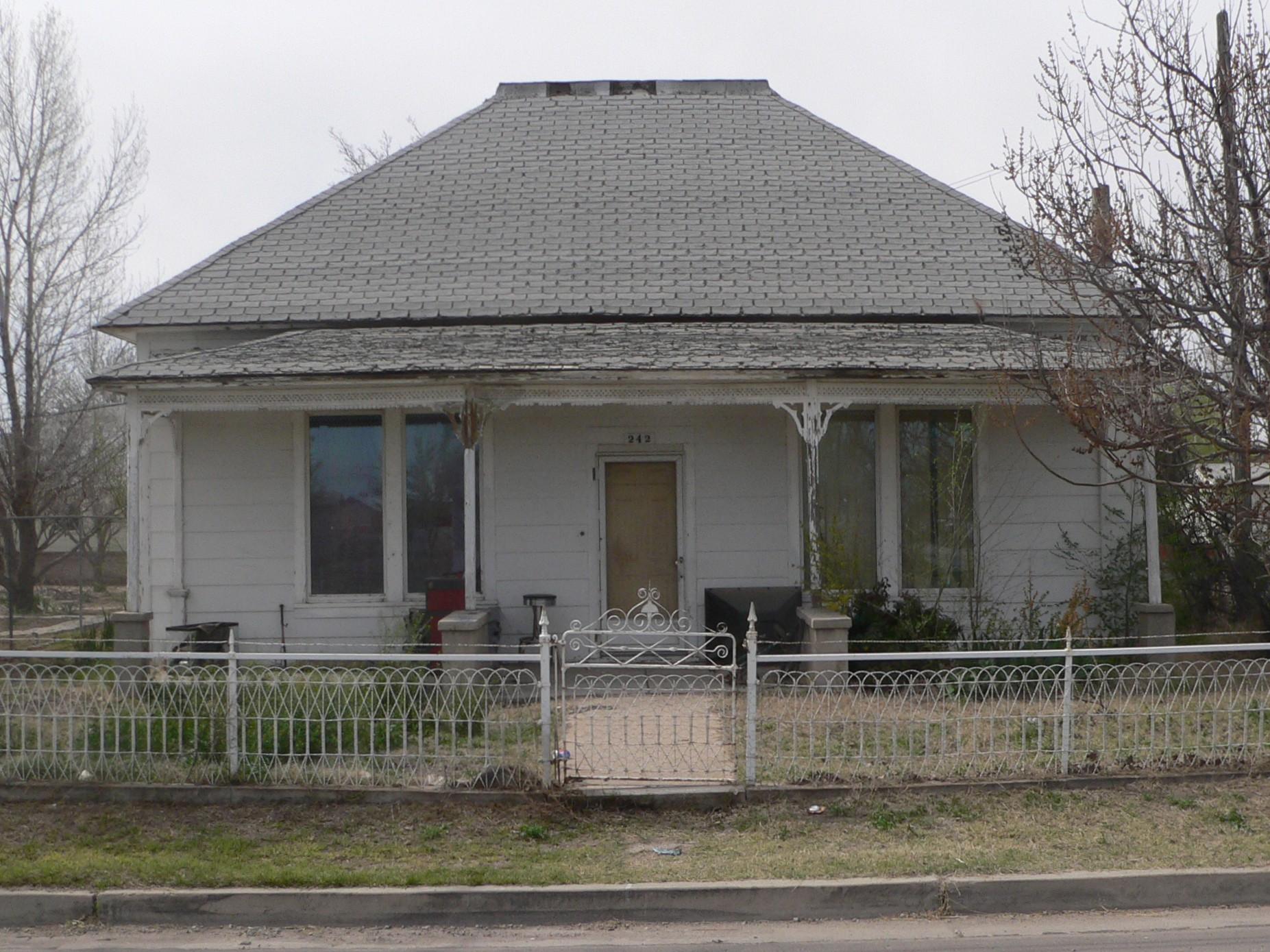

- Location within Arizona Location within the United States
- Location: 242 E. Maley Street, Willcox, Arizona
- Coordinates: 32°15′04″N 109°49′47″W
- NRHP reference No.: 87000746
- Added to NRHP: August 18, 1987

The Morgan House is an historic building in Willcox, Arizona which was added to the National Register of Historic Places in 1987. The house is named after Henry A. Morgan, one of the founders of Willcox, and its first mayor after its incorporation in 1915. He constructed the residence circa 1888. It is a wood-frame structure of Queen Anne architecture. It has a truncated hip roof, covered with asphalt shingles and a single chimney topped with a metal cap, and boxed cornice eaves. The entrance is centered on the home, with a wooden door with a single light and a wooden screen door. It has an open porch with turned wood posts, covered by a shed roof. The site also has a garage, but that was built much later, and is not a contributing structure to the NRHP.
