= Fata Morgana =

Fata Morgana often refers to:

- Fata Morgana (mirage), an optical phenomenon
- Morgan le Fay or Fata Morgana, a sorceress in Arthurian legend

Fata Morgana may also refer to:

== Film and television ==
- "Fata Morgana", a cinematic technique used by the Continental Wondergraph Company screening films in Australia around 1910
- Fata Morgana (1965 film), a Spanish drama
- Fata Morgana (1971 film), by Werner Herzog
- Fata Morgana (2007 film), a German film
- Fata Morgana (game show), a 2004–2008 Flemish TV show
- "Fata Morgana" (Sanctuary), a 2008 TV episode

== Literature ==
- Fata Morgana, an 1896 novel by Elisabeth Bürstenbinder
- Fata Morgana, a 1902–1910 novella by Mykhailo Kotsiubynsky
- Fata Morgana, a 1904 novel by André Castaigne
- Fata Morgana, a 1915 play by Ernest Vajda
- "Fata Morgana", a 1941 long poem by André Breton
- Fata Morgana, a 1977 crime novel by William Kotzwinkle
- Fata Morgana, a 1992 crime novel by Roy Jacobsen
- Fata Morgana, a 1999 science fiction novel by Leo Frankowski
- Fata Morgana, a 2007 poetry collection by Reginald Shepherd

== Music ==
=== Albums ===
- Nico's Last Concert: Fata Morgana, a 1994 album by Nico
- Fata Morgana, a 1995 album by Omer Faruk Tekbilek
- Fata Morgana, a 1995 EP by Fata Morgana, a side project of Mortiis
- Fata Morgana, a 1998 compilation album by Morgana Lefay
- Fata Morgana, a 2011 album by AWS
- Fata Morgana (L'Rain album), a 2026 album by L'Rain

=== Songs ===
- "Fata Morgana", a 1984 song by Dissidenten
- "Fata Morgana", a 1985 song by Erste Allgemeine Verunsicherung from Geld oder Leben!
- "Fata Morgana", a 1986 song by Fates Warning from Awaken the Guardian
- "Fatamorgana (Mirage)", a 1989 song by Ofra Haza from Desert Wind
- "Fata Morgana", a 1993 song by Litfiba from Terremoto
- "Fata Morgana", a 1993 song by Dana International from Danna International (Offer Nissim Presents)
- "Fata morgana", a 2003 song by Mariza Koch
- "Fata Morgana", a 2007 song by El Guincho from Alegranza
- "Fata Morgana", a 2014 song by Israeli Funk band Mercedes Band
- "Fata Morgana", a 2017 song by Markul & Oxxxymiron
- "Fata Morgana", a 2025 song by Spiritbox from Tsunami Sea
- Fata Morgana, a side project involving Tim Alexander of Primus

=== Classical music ===
- "Fata Morgana Polka-mazurka", a polka by Johann Strauss, 1868
- Fata Morgana, a character in Sergei Prokofiev's 1921 opera The Love for Three Oranges
- Fata Morgana, a gavotte Op. 59 by Franz Lehar

== Places ==
- Fata Morgana (Efteling), an amusement park ride in North Brabant, Netherlands
- Fata Morgana Land, a phantom island in the Arctic
- Fatamorgana (photo school), in Copenhagen, Denmark

== See also ==
- Fonte della Fata Morgana, a 15th-century building near Florence, Italy
- The House in Fata Morgana, a 2012 video game
