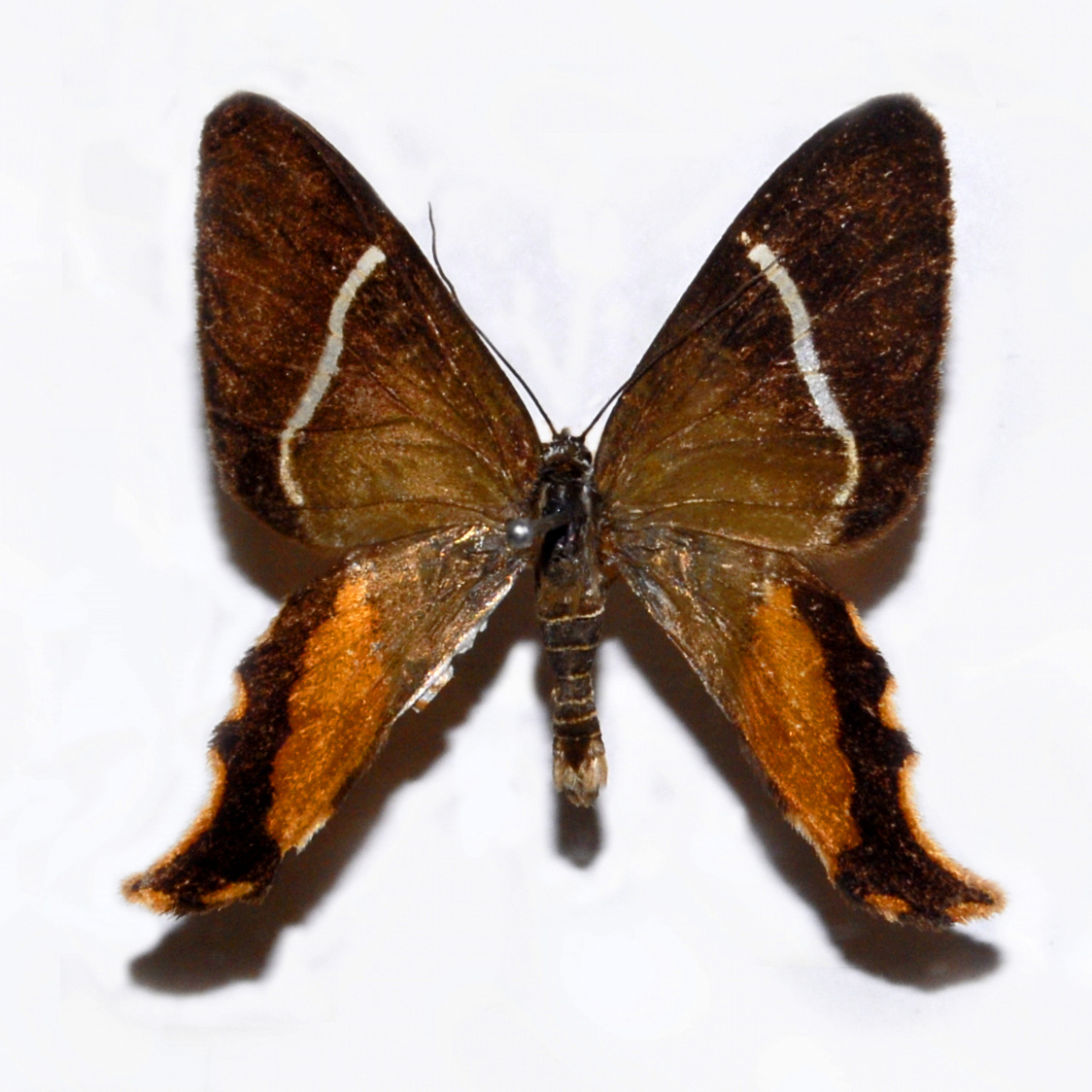
- Mounted specimen on display at the Museo Civico di Storia Naturale di Trieste

Scientific classification
- Kingdom: Animalia
- Phylum: Arthropoda
- Clade: Pancrustacea
- Class: Insecta
- Order: Lepidoptera
- Family: Geometridae
- Genus: Erateina
- Species: E. zoraida

Binomial name
- Erateina zoraida Doubleday, 1845

= Erateina zoraida =

Species of moth

Erateina zoraida is a species of moth in the family Geometridae first described by Edward Doubleday in 1845. It is the type species of the genus Erateina, by original designation.

== Description ==
This moth has elongated, caudate (tapering to a long, tail-like extension at the apex) hindwings.

Anterior and posterior wings are above of a fuscous brown, less tinged with fawn colour, especially towards the base of the wings, the colour varying with the direction of the light. The anterior wings are crossed about the middle by a flexuous white band, commencing below the subcostal nervure, and terminating slightly before the anal angle. The posterior wings are crossed by a sub- marginal band of a dull cinnabar colour, narrow, almost pointed at its commencement near the outer angle, broad at its termination on the inner margin above the anal angle; sending off two short branches to the outer margin. Outer margin is cinnabar-coloured. The under surface of the anterior wings has the base of a dull cinnabar colour, striped longitudinally with white, the cell is crossed by a slightly silvery white band, and the discocellular nervule is marked by a short band of the same colour.

— Original description, Doubleday 1845

== Distribution and habitat ==
These day-flying moths are typically montane and can be found in Neotropical cloud forests of Venezuela.

== Bibliography ==
- Pyrcz, T.W.; Stachowicz, I. & Garlacz, R. (2013). "A new Andean element in the lepidopterous fauna of the Guiana Shield: the day-flying genus Erateina Doubleday, with the description of two new species from Roraima, Tramen and Auyán Tepui (Geometridae: Larentiinae)". Genus. 24 (3–4): 291–301.
