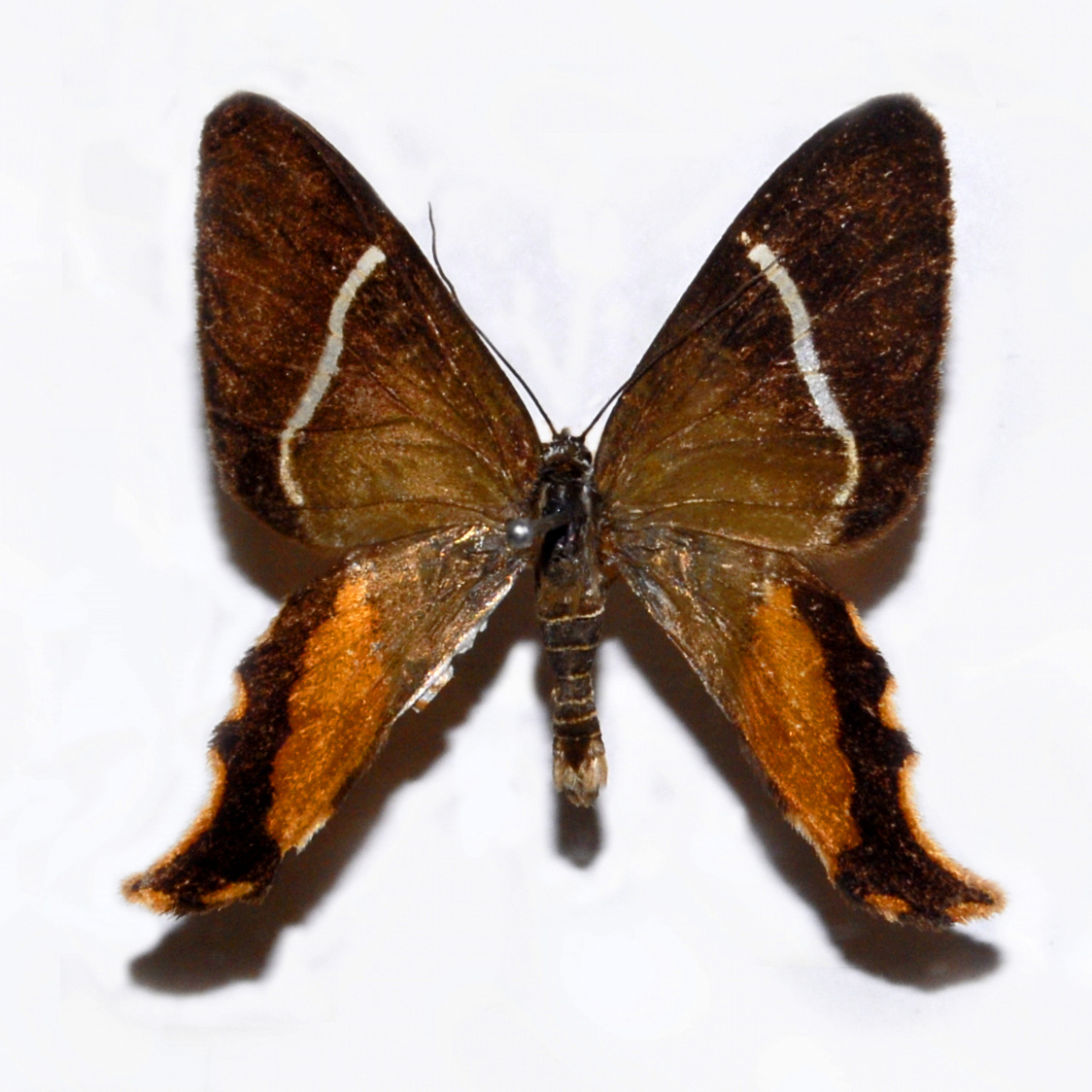
- Mounted specimen of Erateina zoraida on display at the Museo Civico di Storia Naturale di Trieste

Scientific classification
- Kingdom: Animalia
- Phylum: Arthropoda
- Class: Insecta
- Order: Lepidoptera
- Family: Geometridae
- Subfamily: Larentiinae
- Genus: Erateina; Doubleday, 1848

= Erateina =

Genus of moths

Erateina is a genus of moths in the family Geometridae erected by Edward Doubleday in 1848.

== Species ==
This genus contains 85 described species, including:

- Erateina amazonia
- Erateina artabates
- Erateina attali
- Erateina garrulata
- Erateina julia
- Erateina kuczynskii
- Erateina leptograta
- Erateina meduthina
- Erateina puellaastuta
- Erateina radiata
- Erateina rogersi
- Erateina siliquata
- Erateina staudingeri
- Erateina subjunctaria
- Erateina undulata
- Erateina zoraida

== Description ==
Species of this genus have a more or less elongated, caudate hindwings and a peculiar wing shape, characterized by the anal lobe of the males. They lack of a frenulum (in both sexes).

== Habitat ==
These day-flying moths are typically montane and can be found in Neotropical cloud forests.
