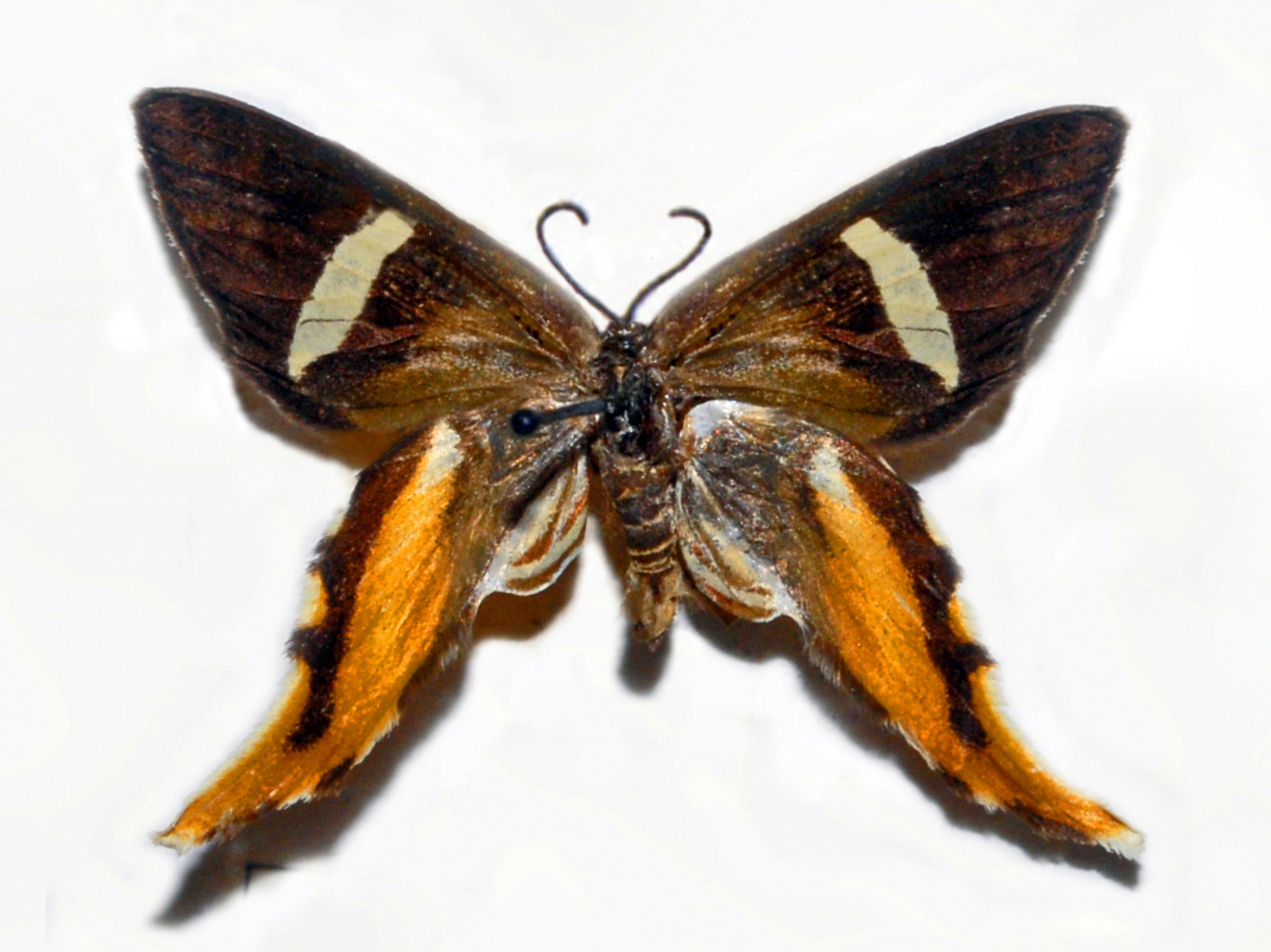
- Mounted specimen on display at the Museo Civico di Storia Naturale di Trieste

Scientific classification
- Kingdom: Animalia
- Phylum: Arthropoda
- Class: Insecta
- Order: Lepidoptera
- Family: Geometridae
- Genus: Erateina
- Species: E. julia

Binomial name
- Erateina julia Doubleday, 1848

Synonyms
- Erateina herbertina Dognin, 1900

= Erateina julia =

Species of moth

Erateina julia is a species of moth in the family Geometridae first described by Edward Doubleday in 1848. These day-flying moths are typically montane and can be found in Neotropical cloud forests of Bolivia.
