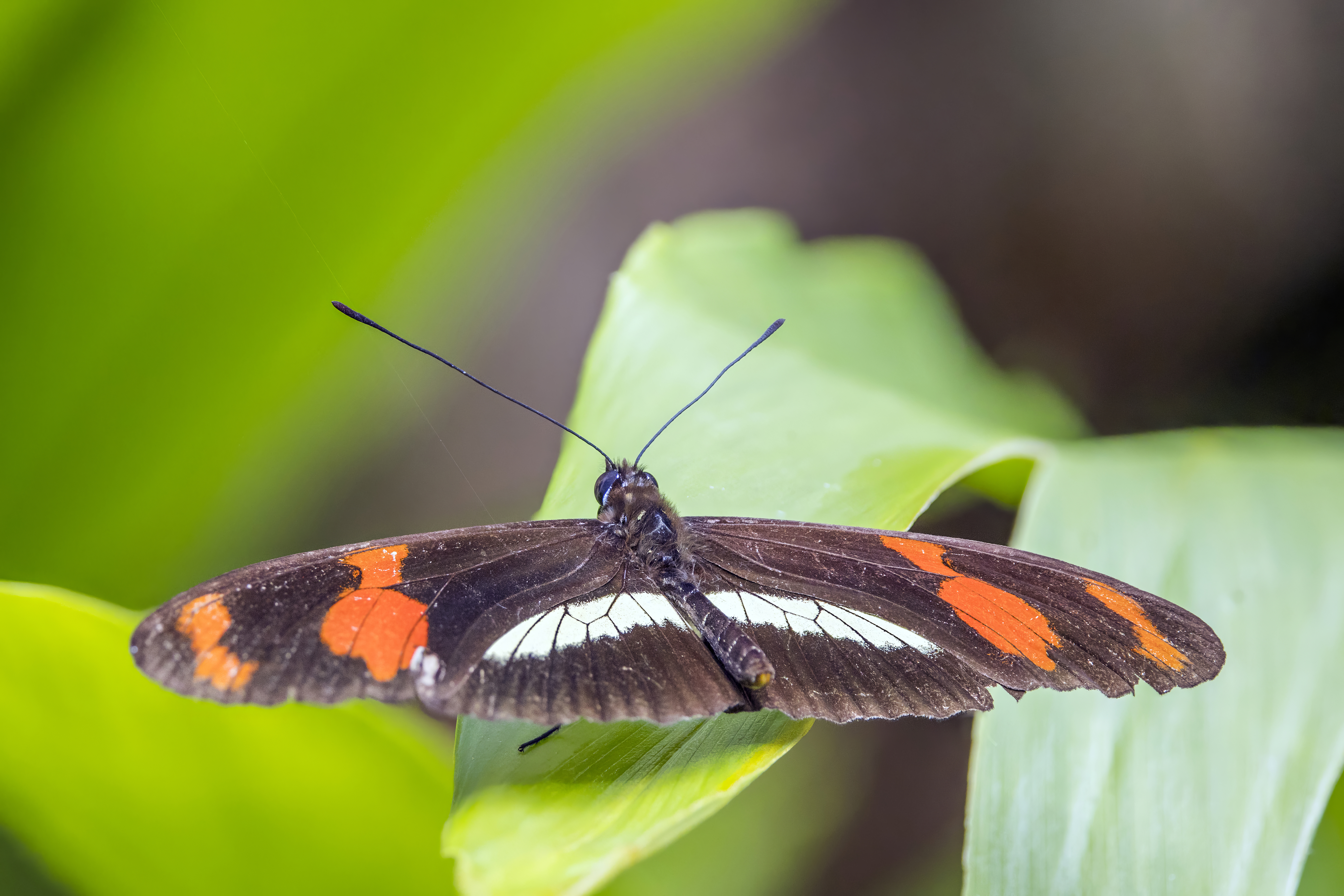

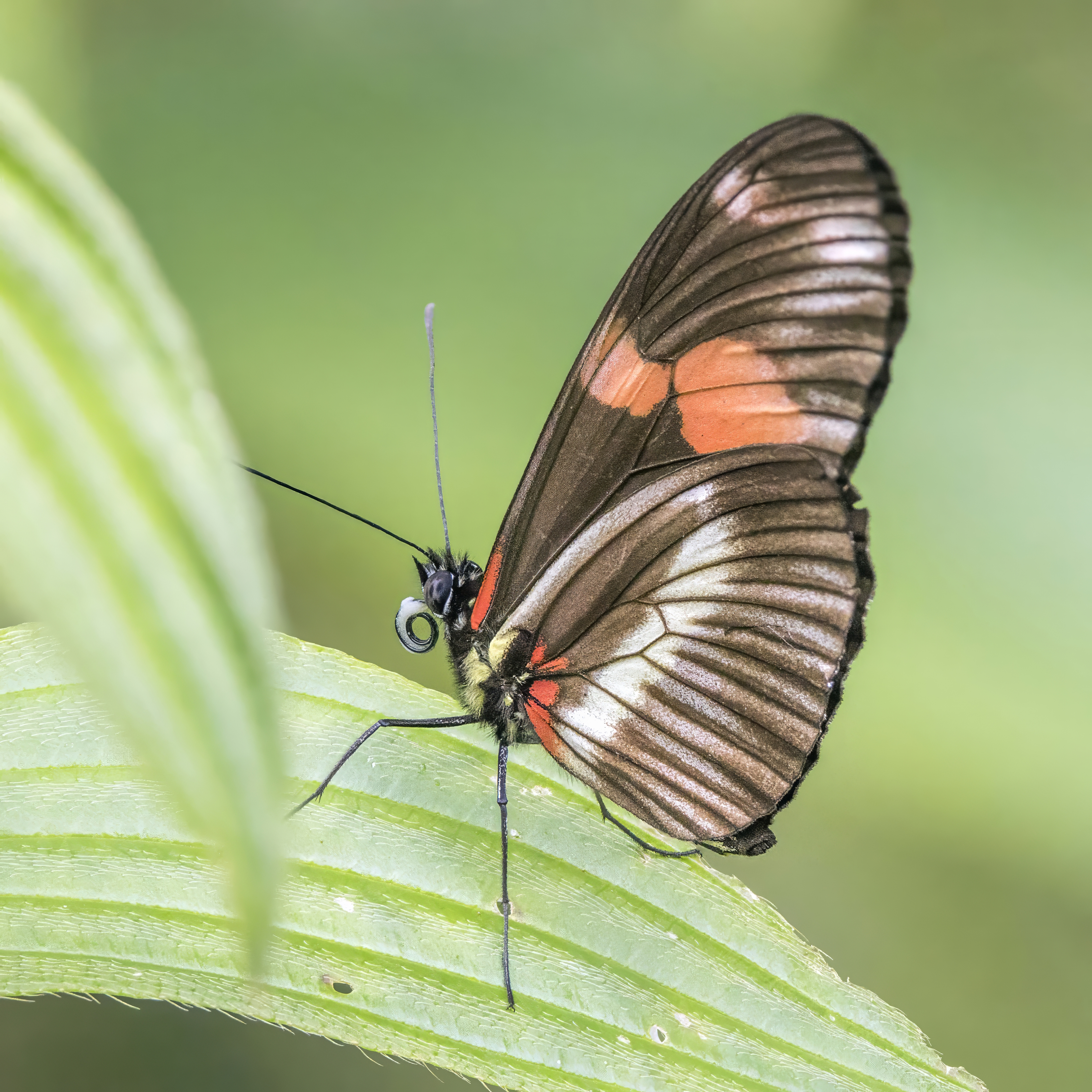
- both H. t. sotericus in Ecuador

Scientific classification
- Domain: Eukaryota
- Kingdom: Animalia
- Phylum: Arthropoda
- Class: Insecta
- Order: Lepidoptera
- Family: Nymphalidae
- Genus: Heliconius
- Species: H. telesiphe

Binomial name
- Heliconius telesiphe (Doubleday, 1847)

Synonyms
- Heliconia telesiphe Doubleday, 1847; Heliconius sotericus Salvin, 1871; Heliconius telesiphe ab. nivea Kaye, 1916

= Heliconius telesiphe =

Telesiphe longwing

Species of butterfly

Heliconius telesiphe, the telesiphe longwing, is a butterfly of the family Nymphalidae. It was described by Edward Doubleday in 1847. It is found at mid-elevations in the Andes. Its habitat is cloud forests.

The wingspan is 65–80 mm. The species is part of a mimicry complex with Podotricha telesiphe.

The larvae mostly feed on Passiflora species from the subgenus Plectostemma. This species assisted in the 1993 discovery of Passiflora telesiphe, a species in the subgenus Decaloba.

== Subspecies ==
- Heliconius telesiphe telesiphe (Bolivia)
- Heliconius telesiphe cretacea Neustetter, 1916 (Peru)
- Heliconius telesiphe sotericus Salvin, 1871 (Ecuador, Peru)
