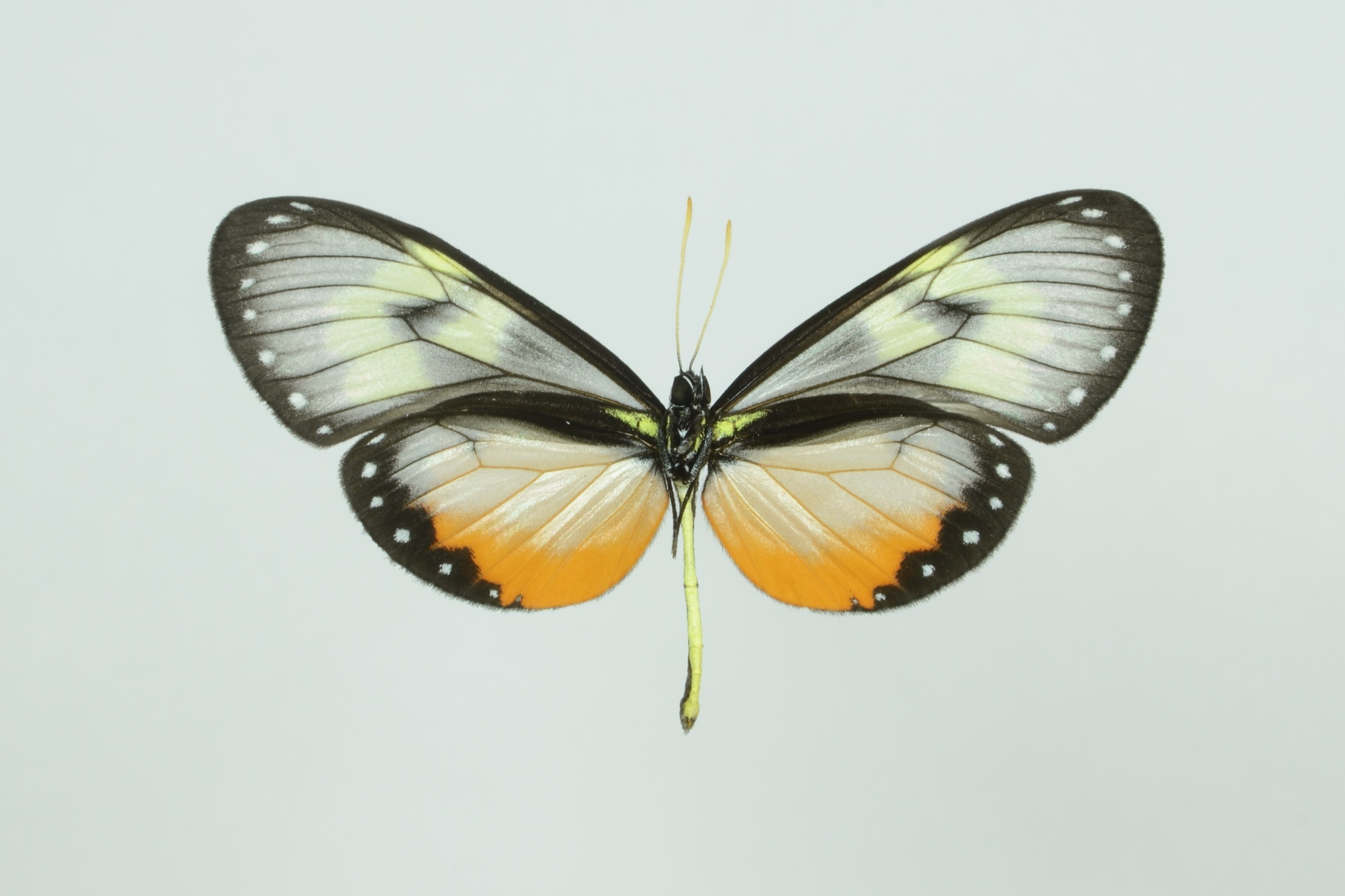

Scientific classification
- Domain: Eukaryota
- Kingdom: Animalia
- Phylum: Arthropoda
- Class: Insecta
- Order: Lepidoptera
- Family: Nymphalidae
- Genus: Hyalyris
- Species: H. coeno

Binomial name
- Hyalyris coeno (Doubleday, [1847])

Synonyms
- Ithomia coeno Doubleday, [1847]; Ceratinia coeno var. guttata Weymer, 1899; Hyalyris deuscula Fox, 1943; Hyalyris robiginota Fox & Real, 1971; Ithomia norella Hewitson, 1859; Hyalyris norella aquilonia Fox, 1941; Hyalyris norella vonhageni Real, 1971; Ceratinia acceptabilis Weeks, 1902; Ceratinia nora Haensch, 1905; Ceratinia norella norellana Haensch, 1903; Ceratinia coeno angustior Schaus & Cockerell, 1923; Teracinia coeno florida Röber, 1930; Hyalyris metaensis Real, 1971

= Hyalyris coeno =

Species of butterfly

Hyalyris coeno is a species of butterfly of the family Nymphalidae. It is found in South America.

== Subspecies ==
- H. c. coeno (Venezuela)
- H. c. acceptabilis (Weeks, 1902) (Bolivia)
- H. c. angustior (Schaus & Cockerell, 1923) (Colombia)
- H. c. atrata Fox, 1971 (Peru)
- H. c. avinoffi Fox, 1971 (Venezuela)
- H. c. florida (Röber, 1930) (Colombia)
- H. c. norella (Hewitson, 1859) (Ecuador)
- H. c. norellana (Haensch, 1903) (Ecuador)
