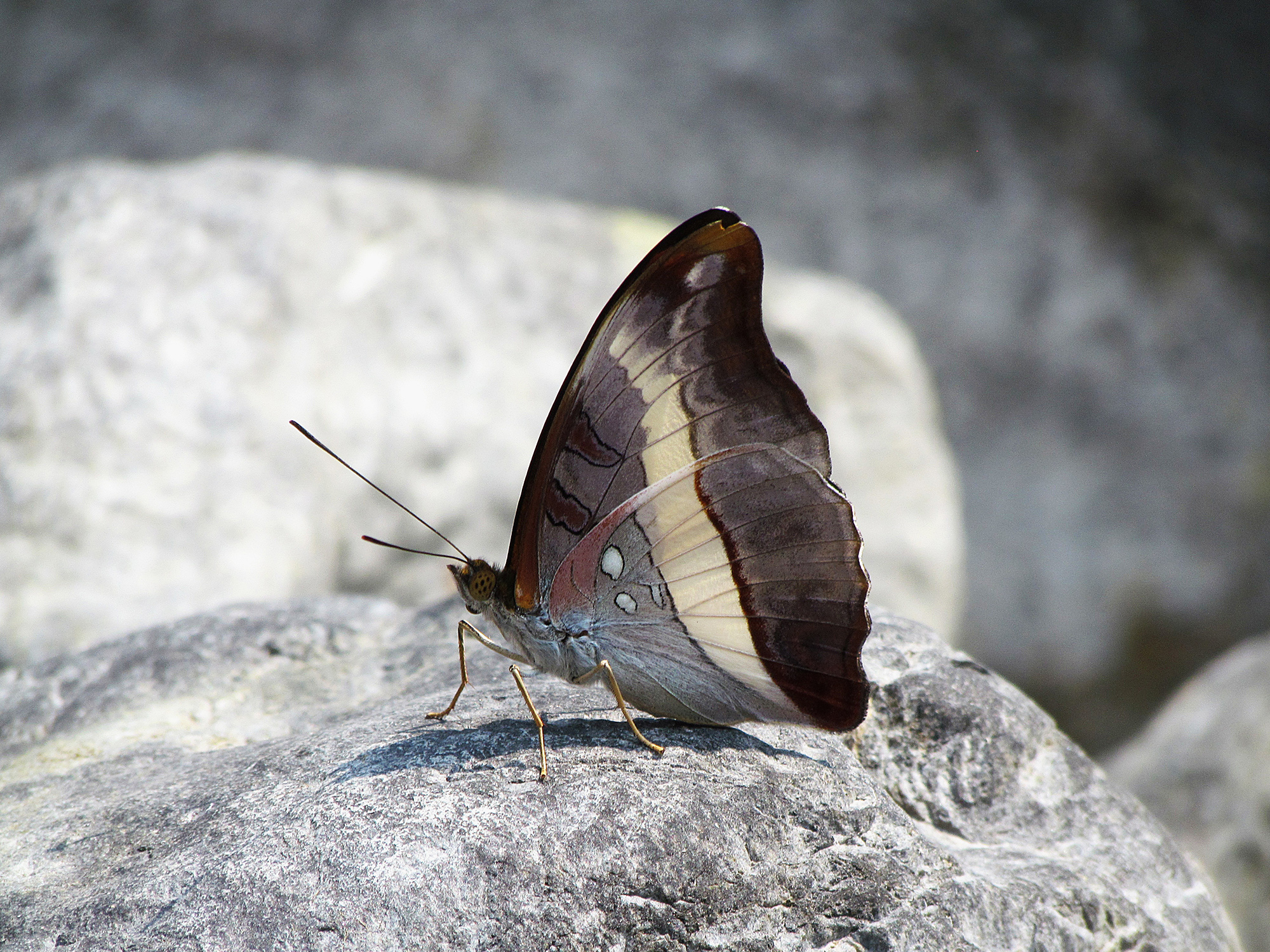
- Ventral View
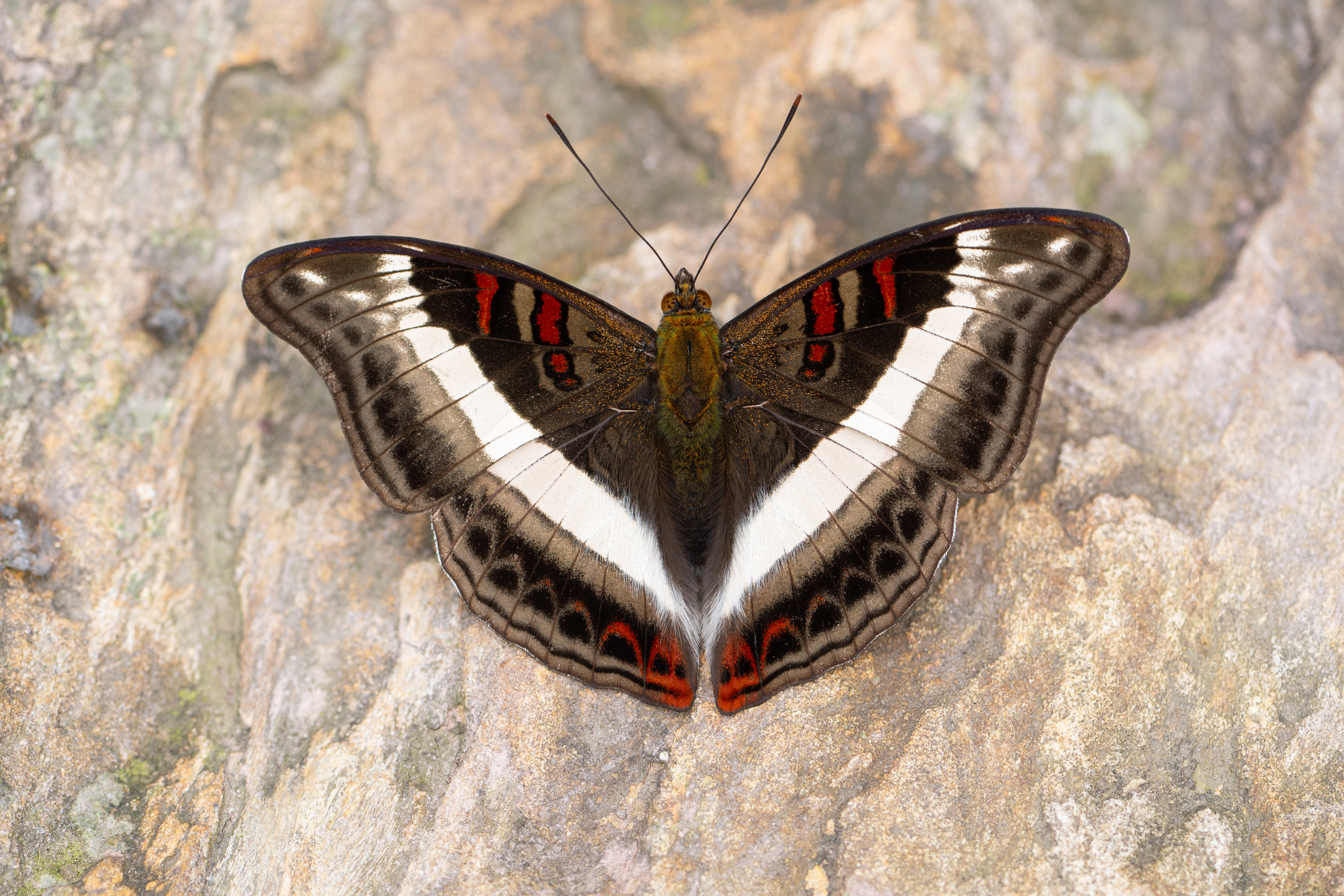
- Dorsal

Scientific classification
- Kingdom: Animalia
- Phylum: Arthropoda
- Class: Insecta
- Order: Lepidoptera
- Family: Nymphalidae
- Genus: Parasarpa
- Species: P. dudu

Binomial name
- Parasarpa dudu (Doubleday, 1848)

= Parasarpa dudu =

White commodore

Species of butterfly

Parasarpa dudu, the white commodore, is a species of nymphalid butterfly found in tropical and subtropical Asia.
