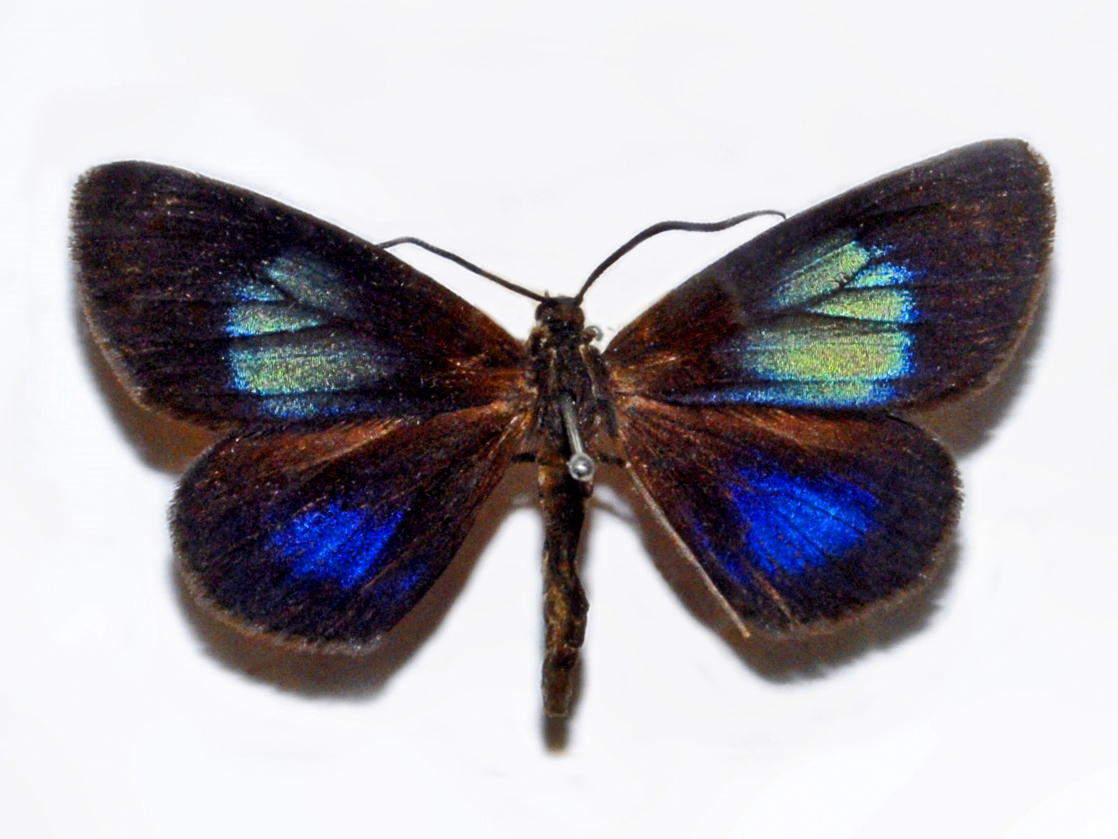
- On display at the Museo Civico di Storia Naturale di Trieste

Scientific classification
- Kingdom: Animalia
- Phylum: Arthropoda
- Class: Insecta
- Order: Lepidoptera
- Superfamily: Geometroidea
- Family: Geometridae
- Subfamily: Ennominae
- Genus: Drymoea
- Species: D. beata

Binomial name
- Drymoea beata (Walker, 1856)

Synonyms
- Sangala beata Godman & Salvin, 1885; Melanoptilon suavaria Snellen, 1874; Sangala suavaria; Nelo suavaria; Letocles decia Boisduval, 1870

= Drymoea beata =

Species of moth

Drymoea beata is a species of moth in the family Geometridae first described by Francis Walker in 1856.

== Description ==
Wings of Drymoea beata can reach a length of about 33–38 millimetres (1.3–1.5 in). Upperside of the wings is deep black, with deep bright blue-green disks.

== Distribution ==
This species can be found in Mexico, Honduras and Colombia.
