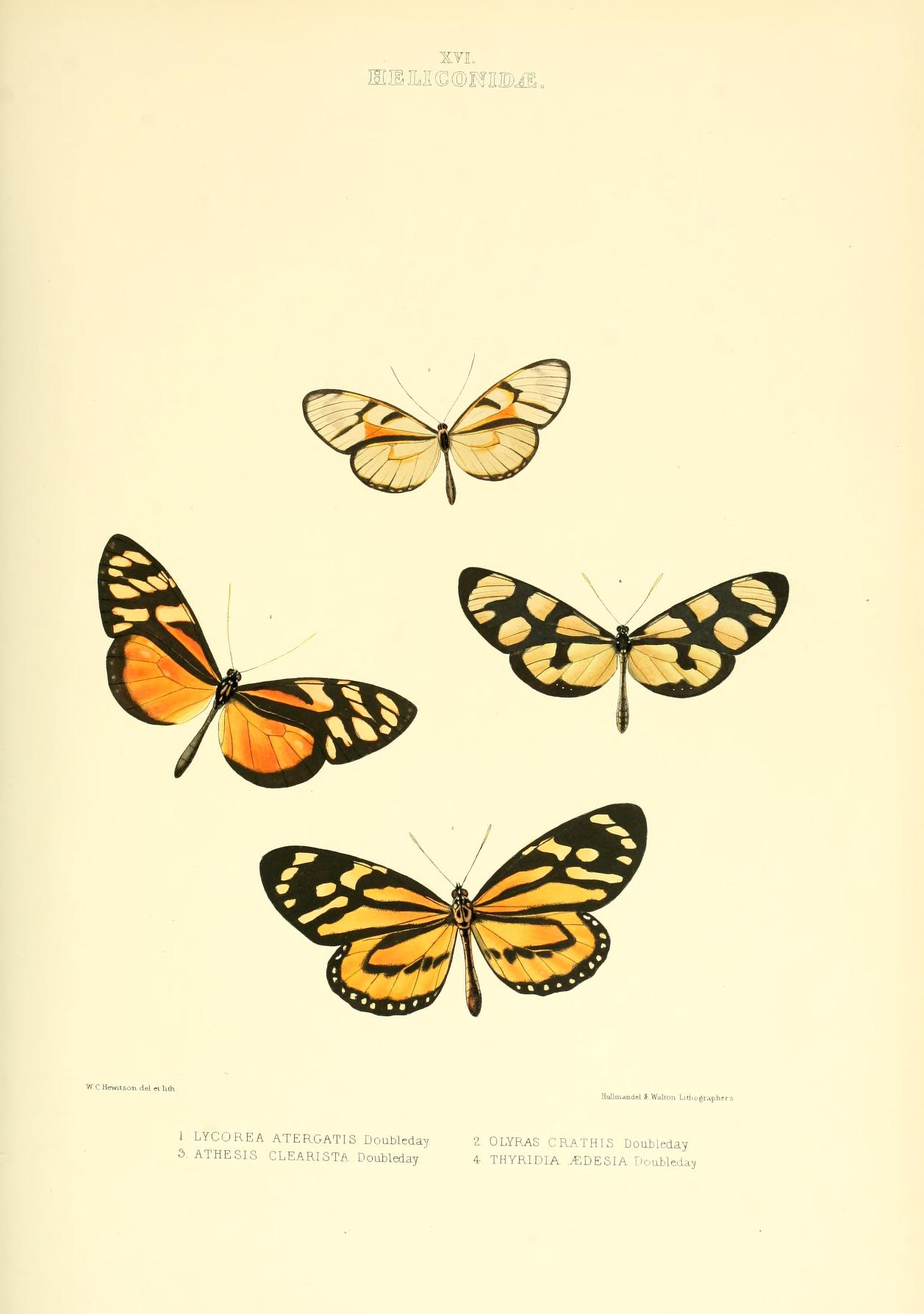
- Figure 3

Scientific classification
- Kingdom: Animalia
- Phylum: Arthropoda
- Class: Insecta
- Order: Lepidoptera
- Family: Nymphalidae
- Genus: Athesis
- Species: A. clearista

Binomial name
- Athesis clearista Doubleday, [1847]

Synonyms
- Athesis clearista bassleri Fox, 1941

= Athesis clearista =

Species of butterfly

Athesis clearista is a species of butterfly of the family Nymphalidae. It is found in Venezuela and Colombia.

== Subspecies ==
- Athesis clearista clearista (northern Venezuela)
- Athesis clearista colombiensis Kaye, 1918 (Colombia)
