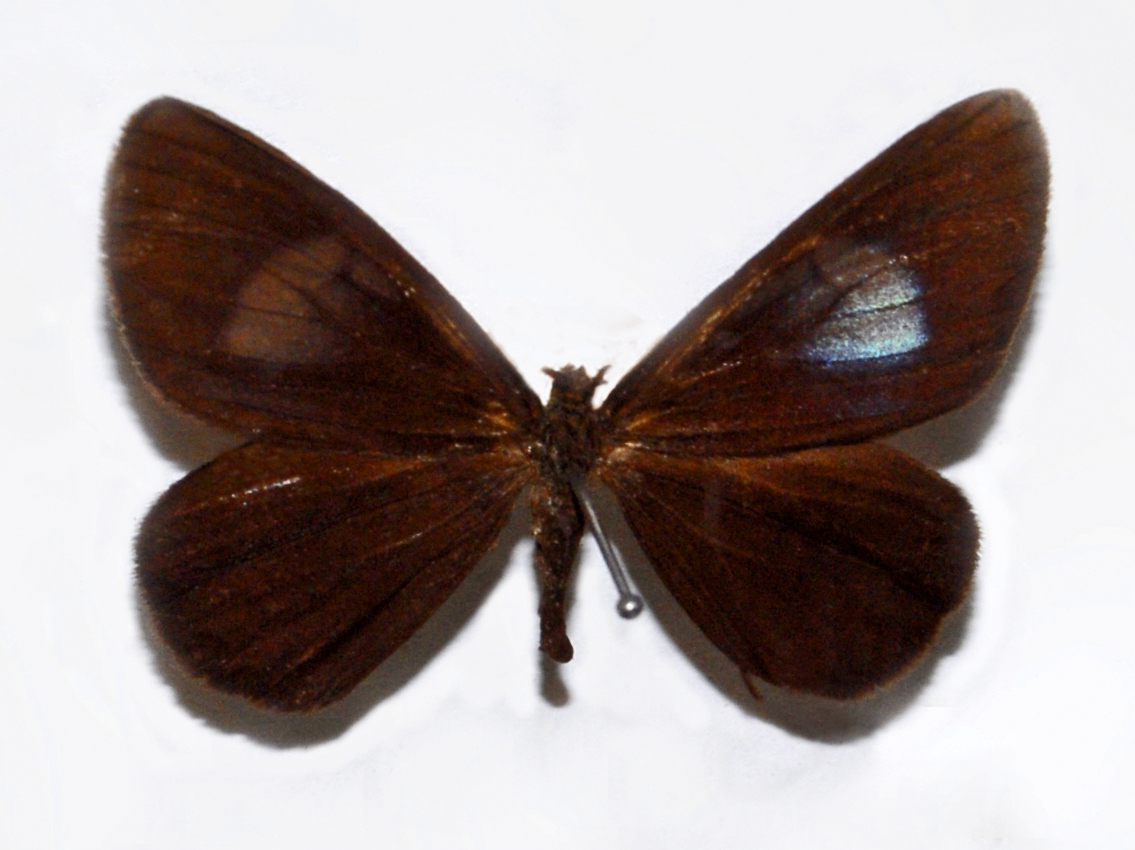
- On display at the Museo Civico di Storia Naturale di Trieste

Scientific classification
- Kingdom: Animalia
- Phylum: Arthropoda
- Class: Insecta
- Order: Lepidoptera
- Superfamily: Geometroidea
- Family: Geometridae
- Subfamily: Ennominae
- Genus: Drymoea
- Species: D. alcera

Binomial name
- Drymoea alcera (Boisduval, 1870)

Synonyms
- Letocles alcera Boisduval, 1870; Sangala alcera; Nelo philodamea Druce, 1885

= Drymoea alcera =

Species of moth

Drymoea alcera is a species of moth in the family Geometridae first described by Jean Baptiste Boisduval in 1870. This species can be found in Bolivia.
