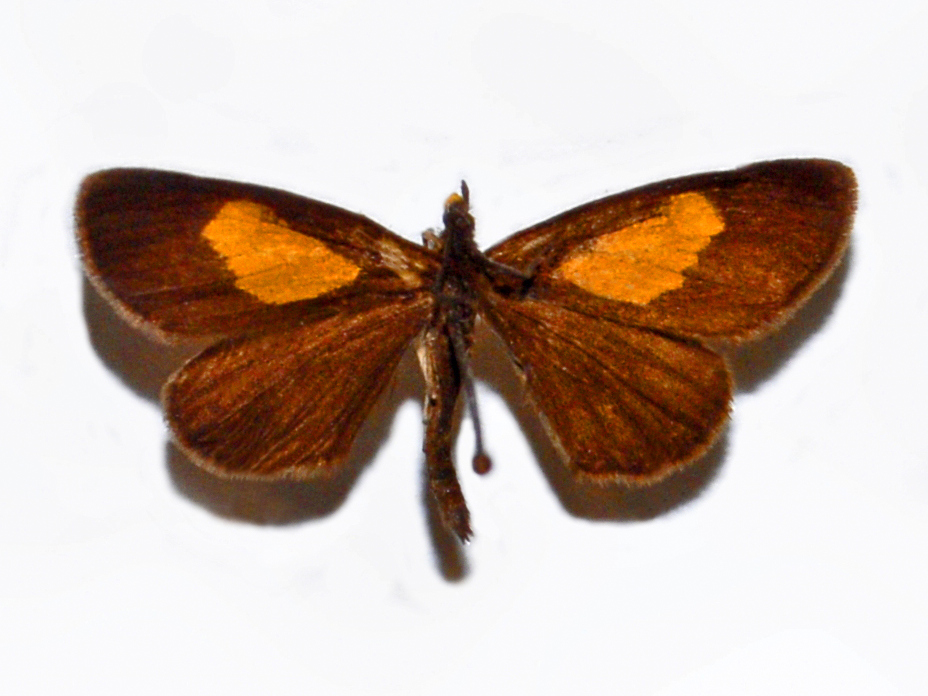
- On display at the Museo Civico di Storia Naturale di Trieste

Scientific classification
- Kingdom: Animalia
- Phylum: Arthropoda
- Clade: Pancrustacea
- Class: Insecta
- Order: Lepidoptera
- Superfamily: Geometroidea
- Family: Geometridae
- Subfamily: Ennominae
- Genus: Drymoea
- Species: D. veliterna

Binomial name
- Drymoea veliterna (H. Druce, 1885)

Synonyms
- Nelo veliterna H. Druce, 1885; Melanoptilon veliterna; Nelo racilia H. Druce, 1899

= Drymoea veliterna =

Species of moth

Drymoea veliterna is a species of moth in the family Geometridae first described by Herbert Druce in 1885. This species can be found in Bolivia.
