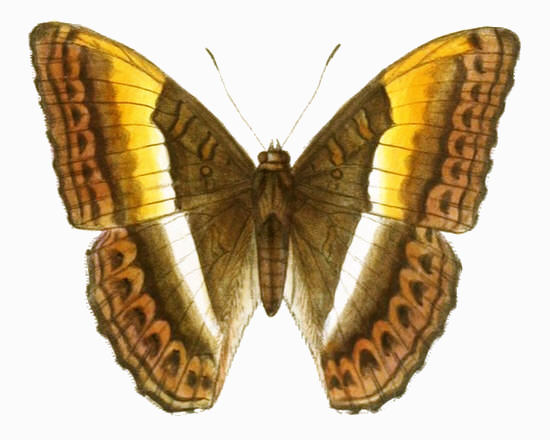

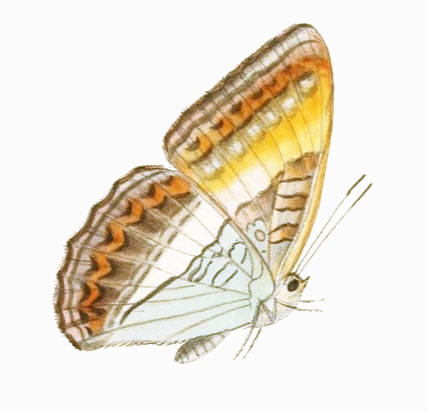

Scientific classification
- Kingdom: Animalia
- Phylum: Arthropoda
- Class: Insecta
- Order: Lepidoptera
- Family: Nymphalidae
- Genus: Parasarpa
- Species: P. zayla

Binomial name
- Parasarpa zayla (Doubleday, 1848)

= Parasarpa zayla =

Bicolor commodore

Species of butterfly

Parasarpa zayla, the bicolor commodore, is a species of nymphalid butterfly

== Distribution ==
It is found across tropical and subtropical Asia.

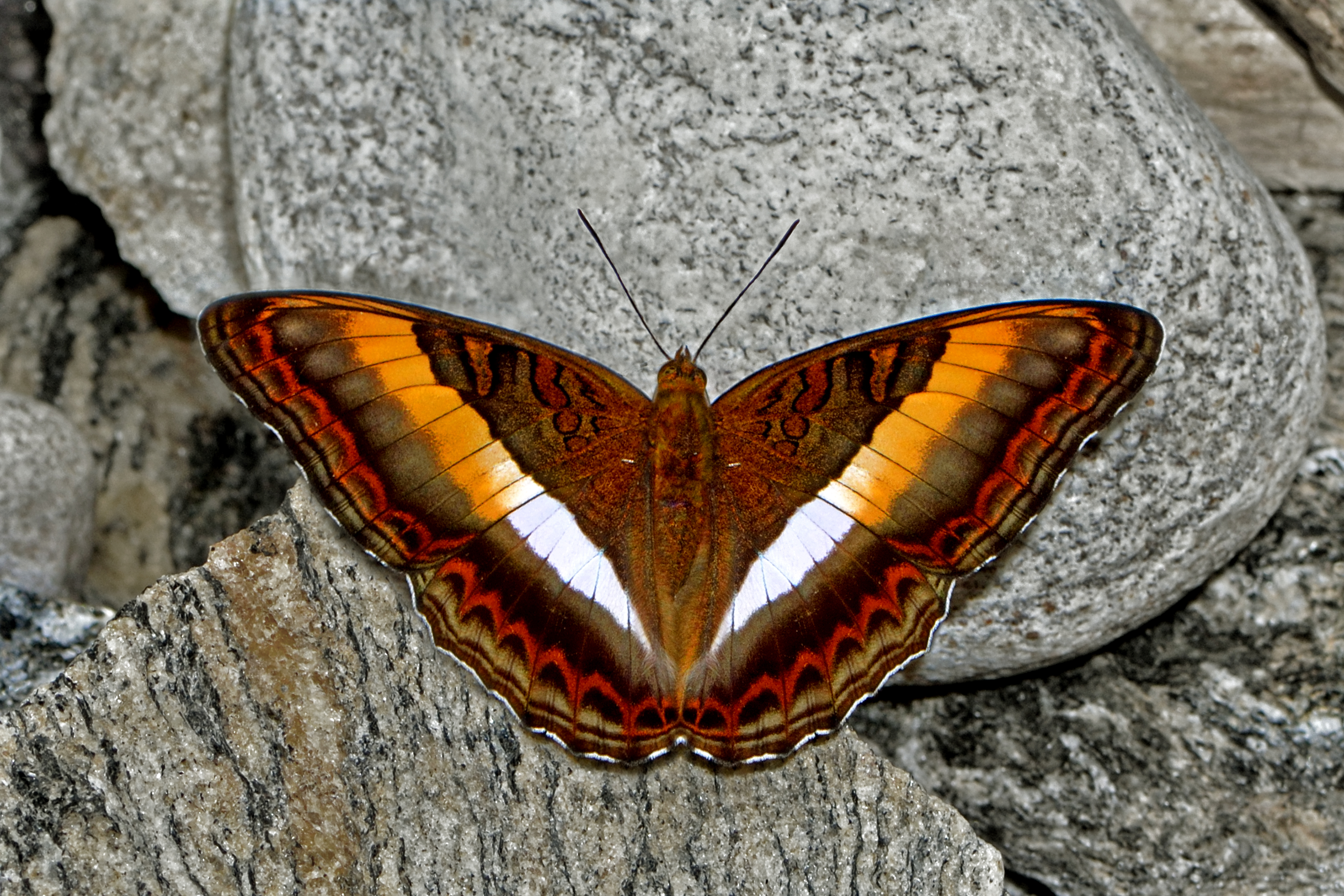
Open wing position of Parasarpa zayla Doubleday, 1848 – Bicolor Commodore
