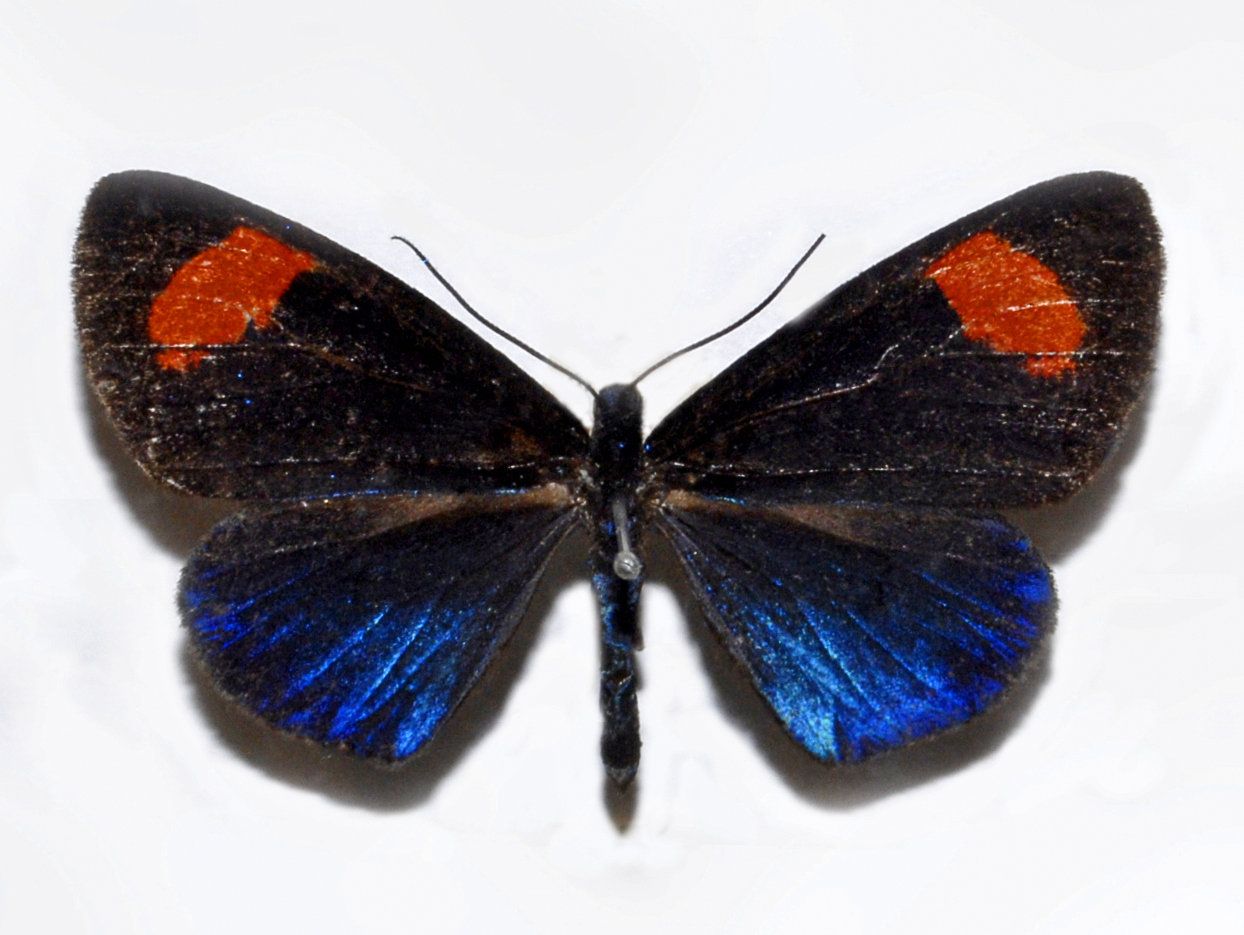
- Mounted specimen on display at the Museo Civico di Storia Naturale di Trieste

Scientific classification
- Kingdom: Animalia
- Phylum: Arthropoda
- Class: Insecta
- Order: Lepidoptera
- Family: Geometridae
- Subfamily: Ennominae
- Genus: Drymoea; Walker, 1854

Synonyms
- Sangala Walker, 1854; Melanoptilon Herrich-Schäffer, 1855; Nelo Walker, 1854; Nelopsis Warren, 1895

= Drymoea =

Genus of moths

Drymoea is a genus of moths in the family Geometridae erected by Francis Walker in 1854. This genus was originally proposed in the family Arctiidae, but was later transferred to the Geometridae. Some other genera (Sangala, Melanoptilon, Nelo and Nelopsis) were then included in this genus. The genus is confined to the Neotropical realm.

== Species ==
In alphabetical order:

- Drymoea aenea (Warren, 1904)
- Drymoea alcera (Boisduval, 1870)
- Drymoea antiphates (Druce, 1885)
- Drymoea beata (Walker, 1856)
- Drymoea caelisigna (Walker, 1854)
- Drymoea choba (Druce, 1899)
- Drymoea chrysomela (Butler & Druce, 1872)
- Drymoea collinsi (Fletcher, 1952)
- Drymoea crescens (Warren, 1904)
- Drymoea cyaneres (Prout, 1916)
- Drymoea cydrara (Druce, 1907)
- Drymoea cynara (Druce, 1907)
- Drymoea darthula (Thierry-Mieg, 1893)
- Drymoea discalis (Walker, 1854)
- Drymoea donuca (Druce, 1907)
- Drymoea flora (Warren, 1897)
- Drymoea glaucata (Fletcher, 1952)
- Drymoea hesperoides (Walker, 1854)
- Drymoea imparata (Walker, [1865])
- Drymoea lippa (Schaus, 1892)
- Drymoea mediata (Warren, 1906)
- Drymoea nasuta (Walker, [1865])
- Drymoea pandia (Druce, 1899)
- Drymoea sacrata (Felder & Felder, 1862)
- Drymoea satellitia (Warren, 1897)
- Drymoea simulans (Walker, 1854)
- Drymoea splendidissima (Bastelberger, 1911)
- Drymoea subcyanea (Dognin, 1903)
- Drymoea timidaria (Herrich-Schäffer, [1856])
- Drymoea tolosa (Druce, 1885)
- Drymoea tricolor (Thierry-Mieg, 1905)
- Drymoea unimaculata Butler, 1876
- Drymoea veliterna (Druce, 1885)
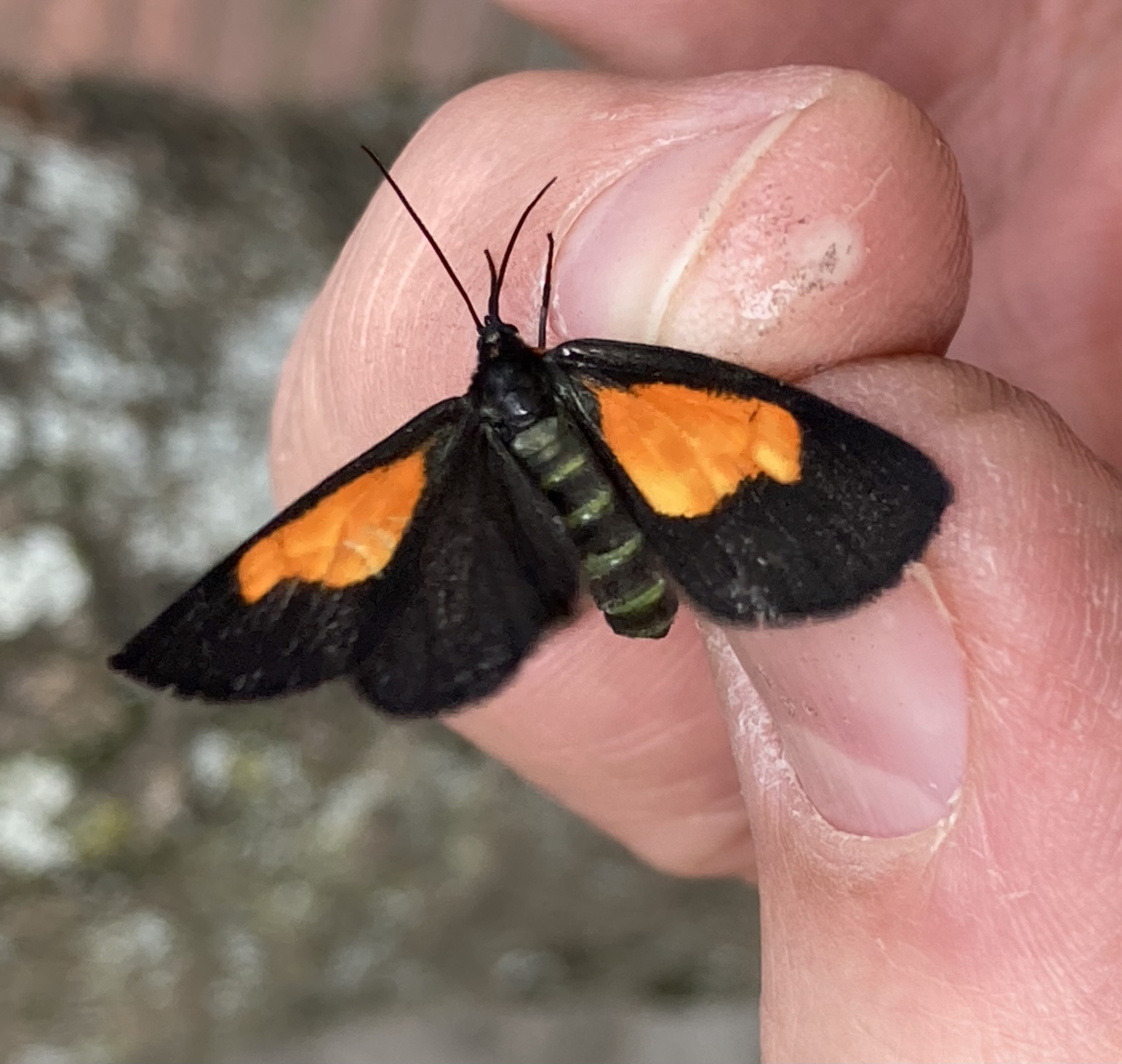
Drymoea veliterna, Colombia

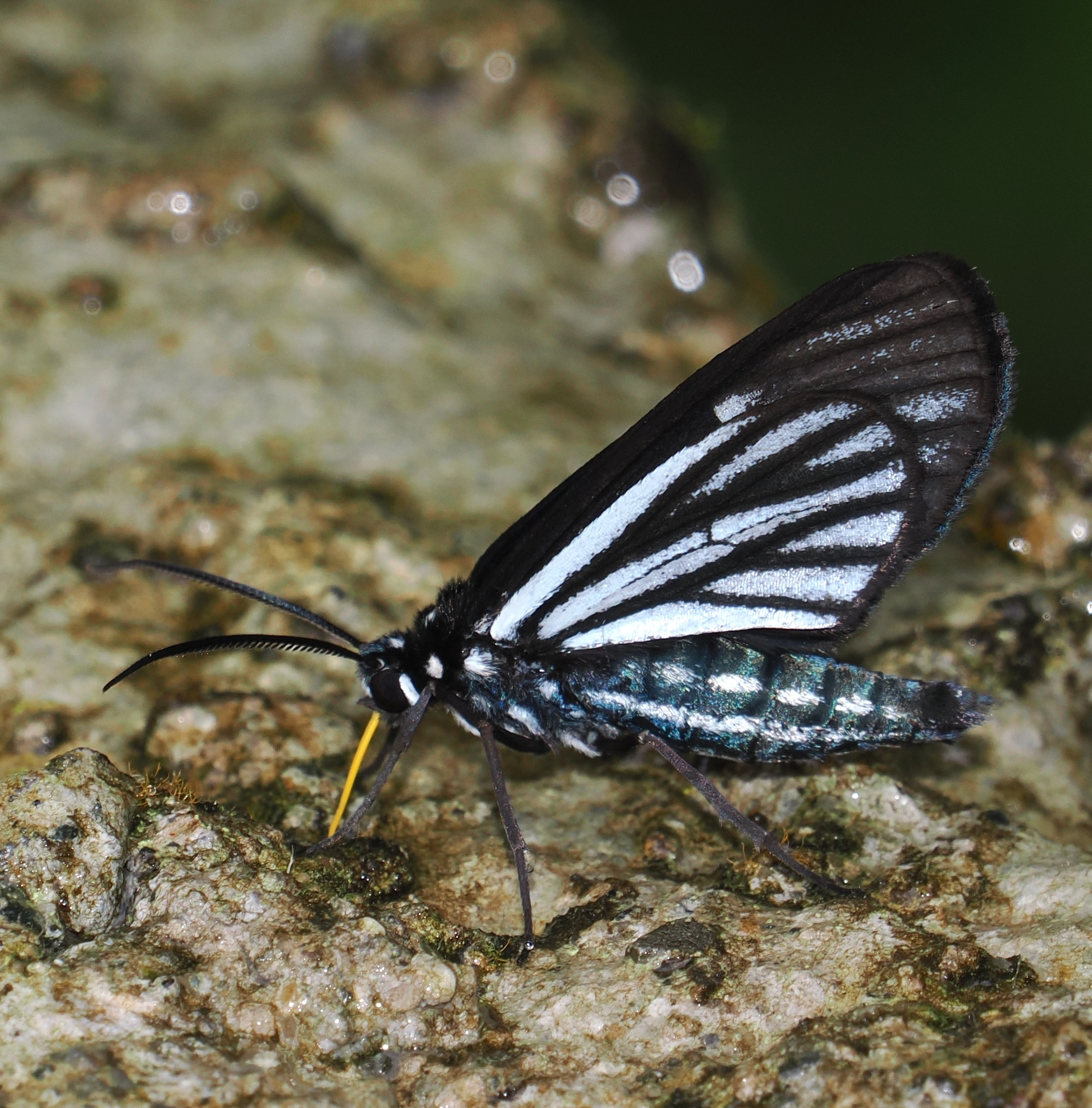
Drymoea hesperoides, Colombia

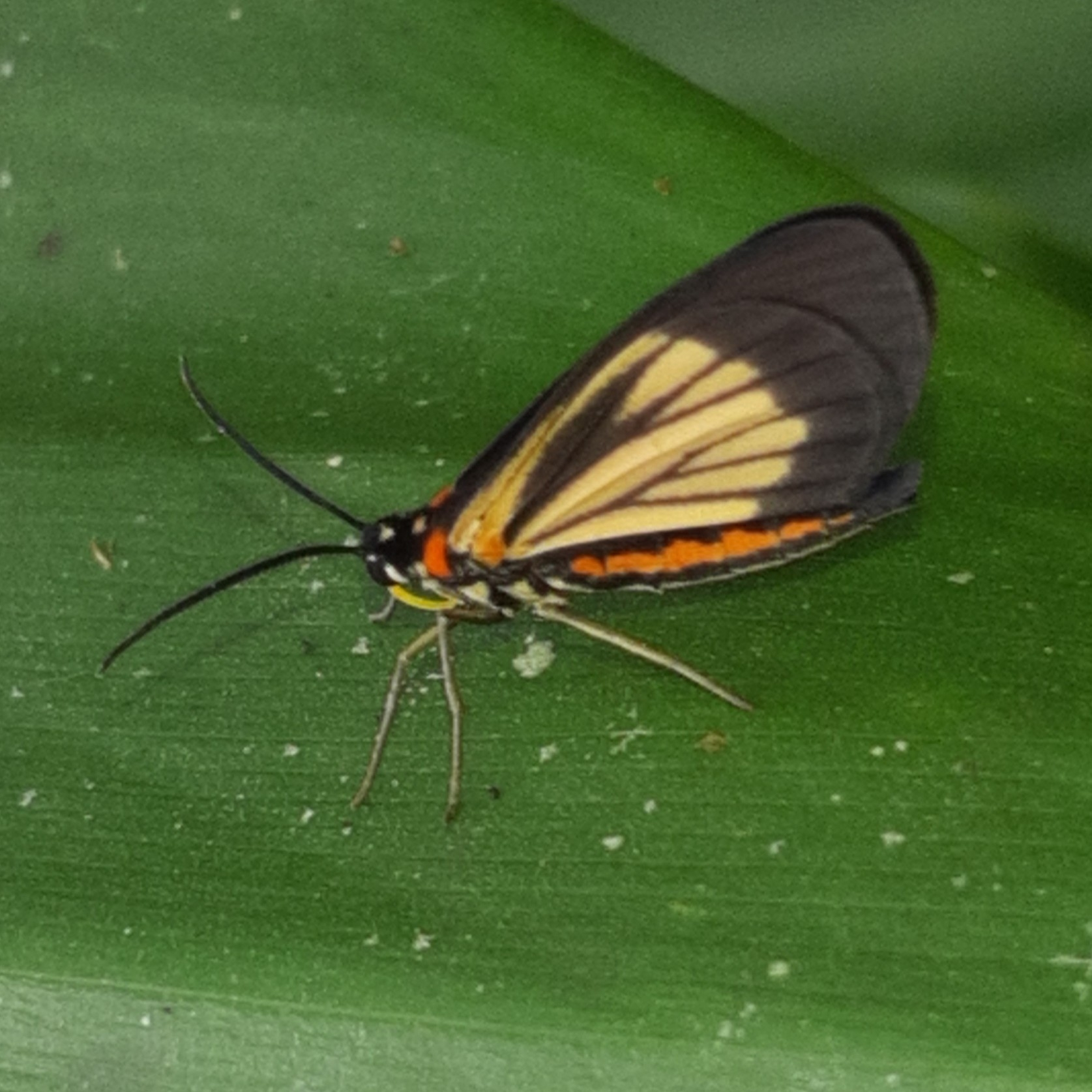
Drymoea chrysomela, Costa Rica

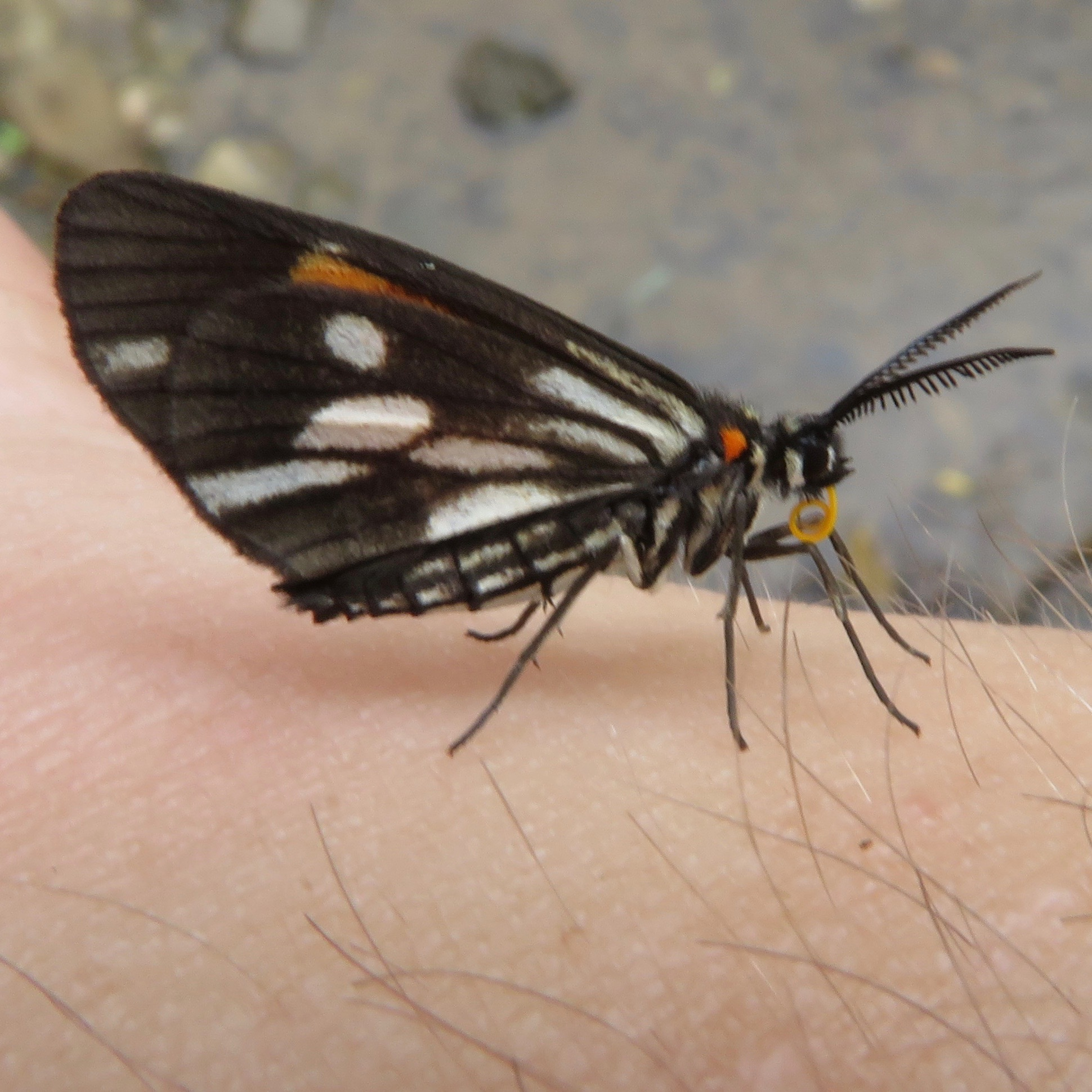
Drymoea satellitia, Costa Rica
