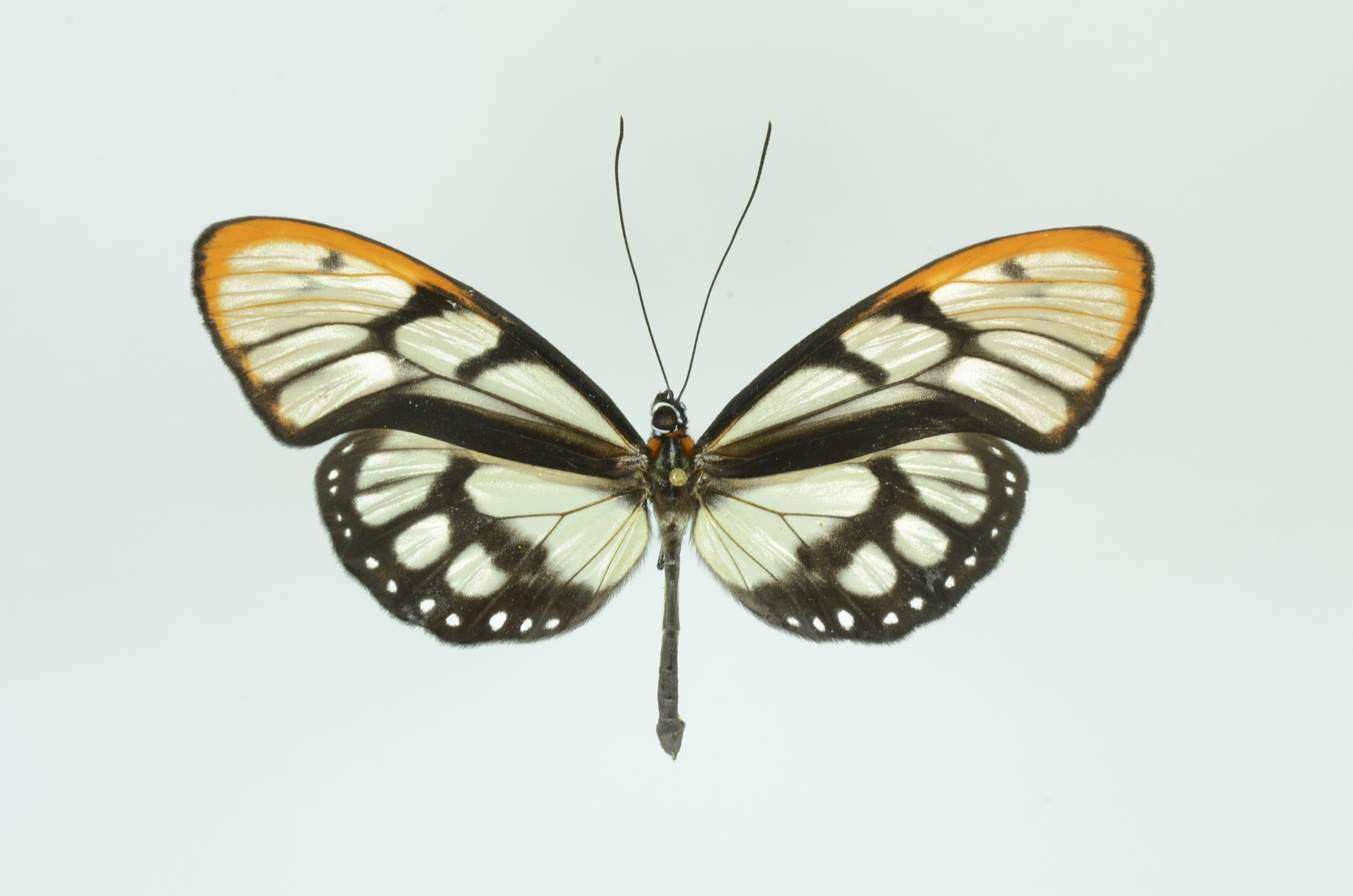
- Athesis acrisione

Scientific classification
- Kingdom: Animalia
- Phylum: Arthropoda
- Class: Insecta
- Order: Lepidoptera
- Family: Nymphalidae
- Tribe: Ithomiini
- Genus: Athesis; Doubleday, [1847]

Type species
- Athesis clearista Doubleday, 1847

Species
- See text

Synonyms
- Roswellia Fox, 1948

= Athesis =

Genus of brush-footed butterflies

Athesis is a Neotropical genus of clearwing (ithomiine) butterflies, named by Edward Doubleday in 1847. They are in the brush-footed butterfly family, Nymphalidae.

== Species ==
Arranged alphabetically:

- Athesis acrisione Hewitson, 1869
- Athesis clearista Doubleday, [1847]
- Athesis vitrala Kaye, 1918
