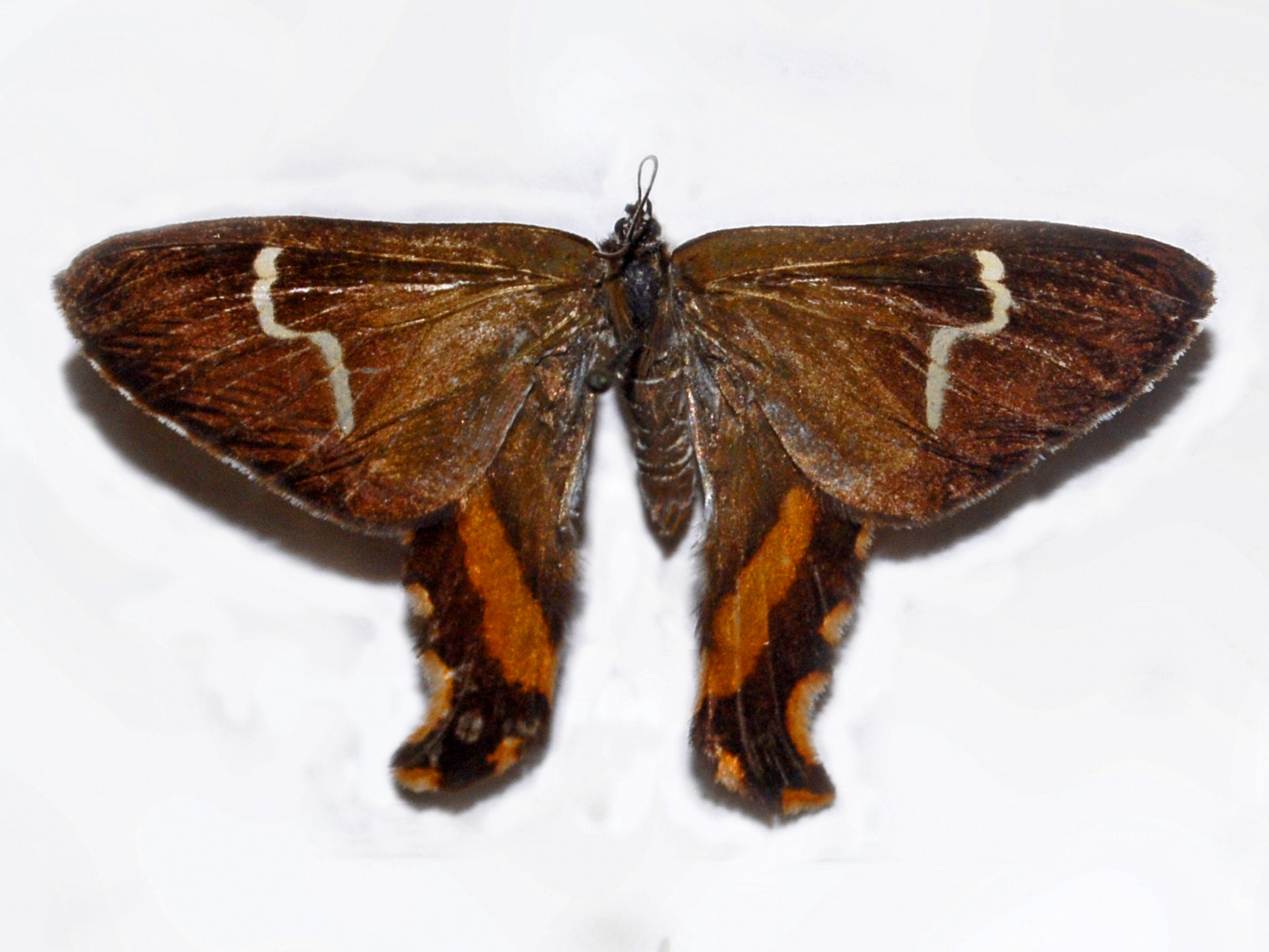
- Mounted specimen on display at the Museo Civico di Storia Naturale di Trieste

Scientific classification
- Kingdom: Animalia
- Phylum: Arthropoda
- Clade: Pancrustacea
- Class: Insecta
- Order: Lepidoptera
- Family: Geometridae
- Genus: Erateina
- Species: E. undulata

Binomial name
- Erateina undulata Saunders, 1860

= Erateina undulata =

Species of moth

Erateina undulata is a species of moth in the family Geometridae first described by William Wilson Saunders in 1860. These day-flying moths are typically montane and can be found in Neotropical cloud forests of Colombia.
