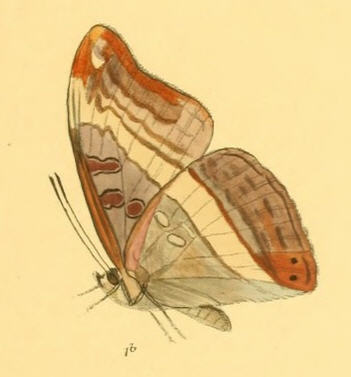
- Parasarpa dudu

Scientific classification
- Domain: Eukaryota
- Kingdom: Animalia
- Phylum: Arthropoda
- Class: Insecta
- Order: Lepidoptera
- Family: Nymphalidae
- Tribe: Limenitidini
- Genus: Parasarpa; Moore, [1898]

Species
- See text

Synonyms
- Hypolimnesthes Moore, [1898]

= Parasarpa =

Genus of brush-footed butterflies

Parasarpa is a genus of butterflies. Parasarpa hollandi ranges from Lombok to Timor. Parasarpa albidior and Parasarpa houlberti are known only from Yunnan. The three other species occur in northern India and southern China.

== Species ==
- Parasarpa albomaculata (Leech, 1891)
- Parasarpa albidior (Hall, 1930)
- Parasarpa dudu (Doubleday, [1848]) – white commodore
- Parasarpa hollandi Doherty, 1891
- Parasarpa houlberti (Oberthür, 1913)
- Parasarpa zayla (Doubleday, [1848]) – bicolor commodore
