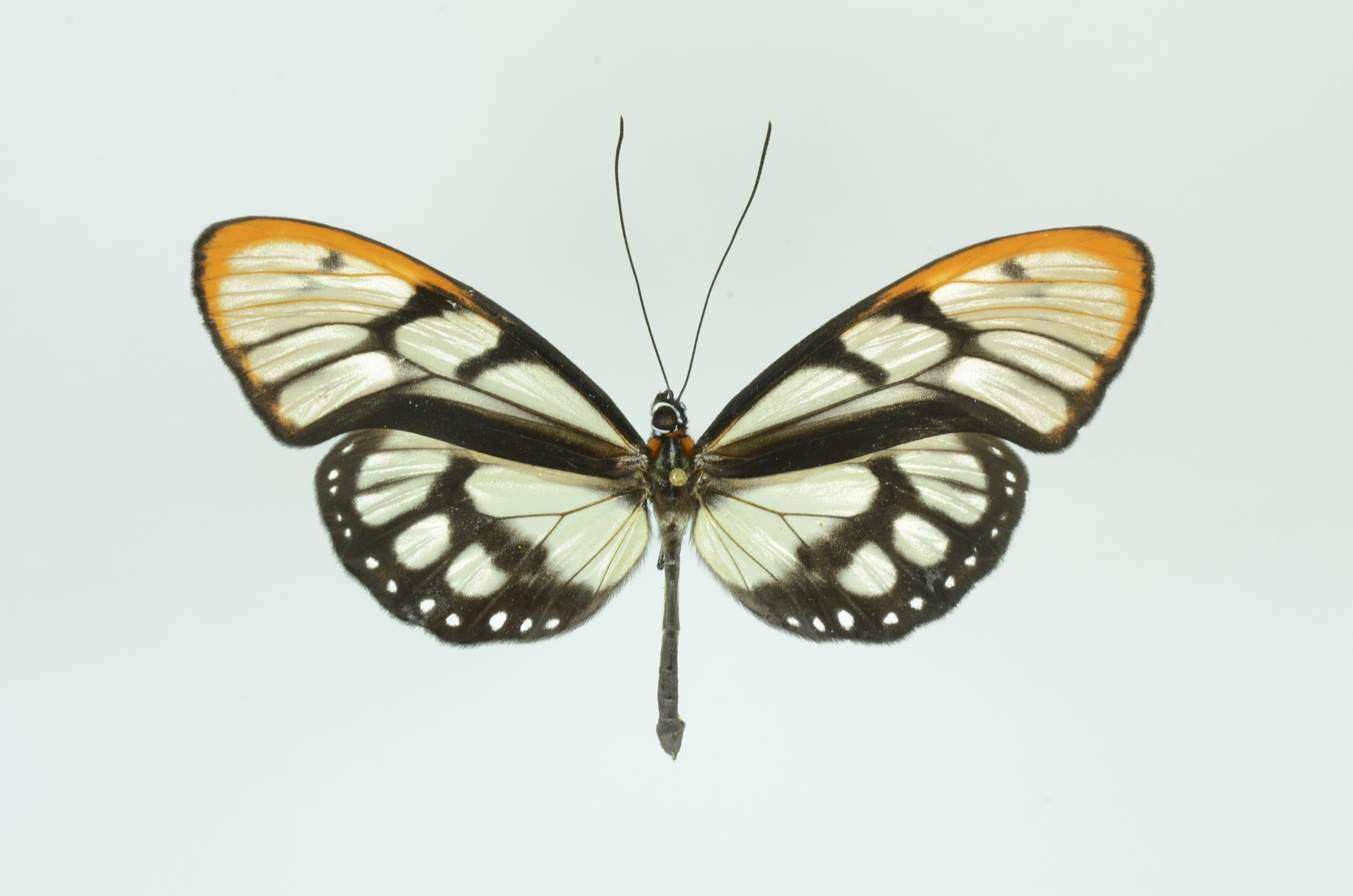

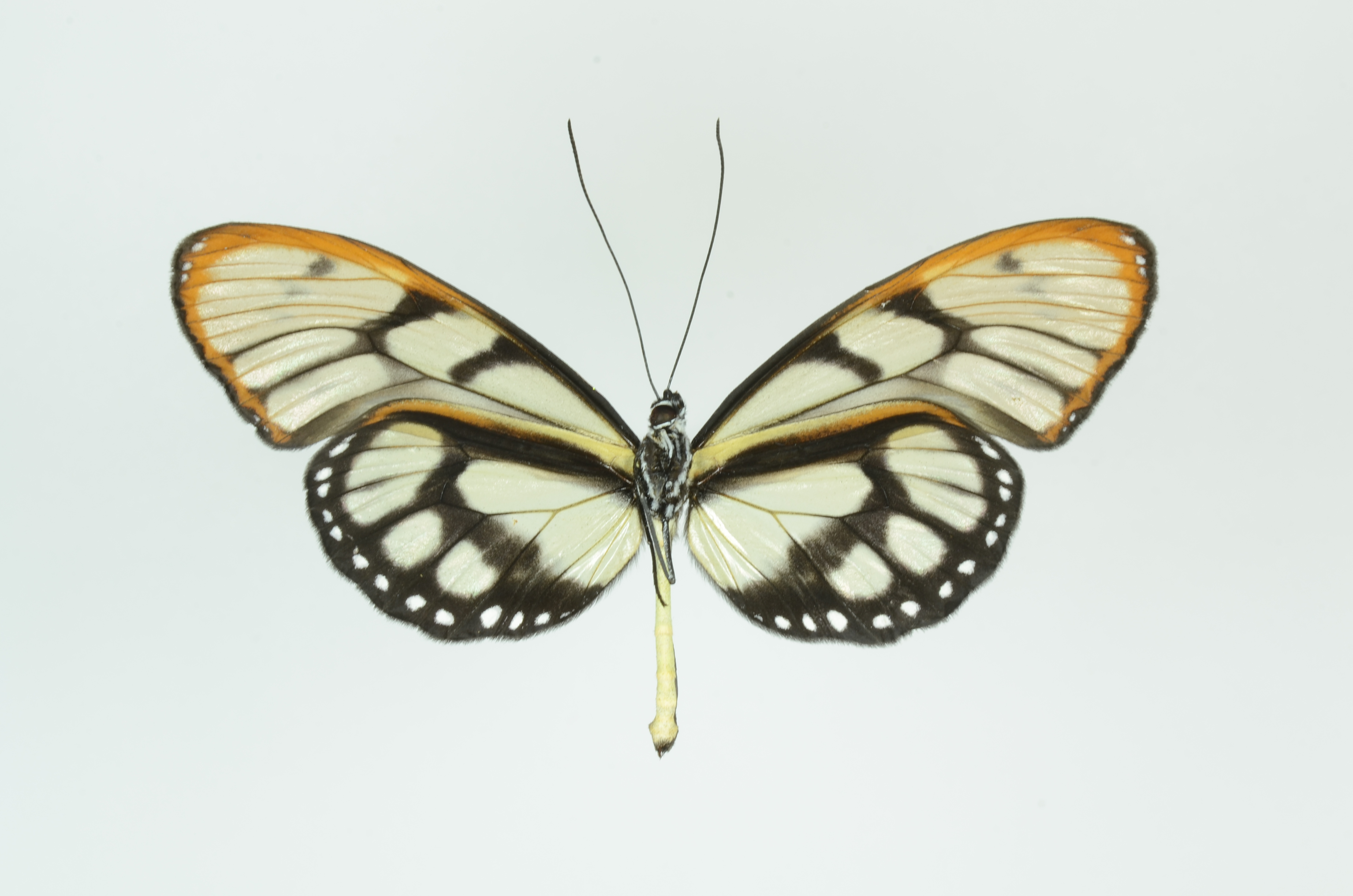

Scientific classification
- Kingdom: Animalia
- Phylum: Arthropoda
- Class: Insecta
- Order: Lepidoptera
- Family: Nymphalidae
- Genus: Athesis
- Species: A. acrisione

Binomial name
- Athesis acrisione Hewitson, 1869

Synonyms
- Roswellia acrisione

= Athesis acrisione =

Species of butterfly

Athesis acrisione is a species of butterfly of the family Nymphalidae. It is found from Colombia and Ecuador.

== Subspecies ==
- Athesis acrisione acrisione (eastern Ecuador)
- Athesis acrisione deflavata Niepelt, 1928 (Colombia)
