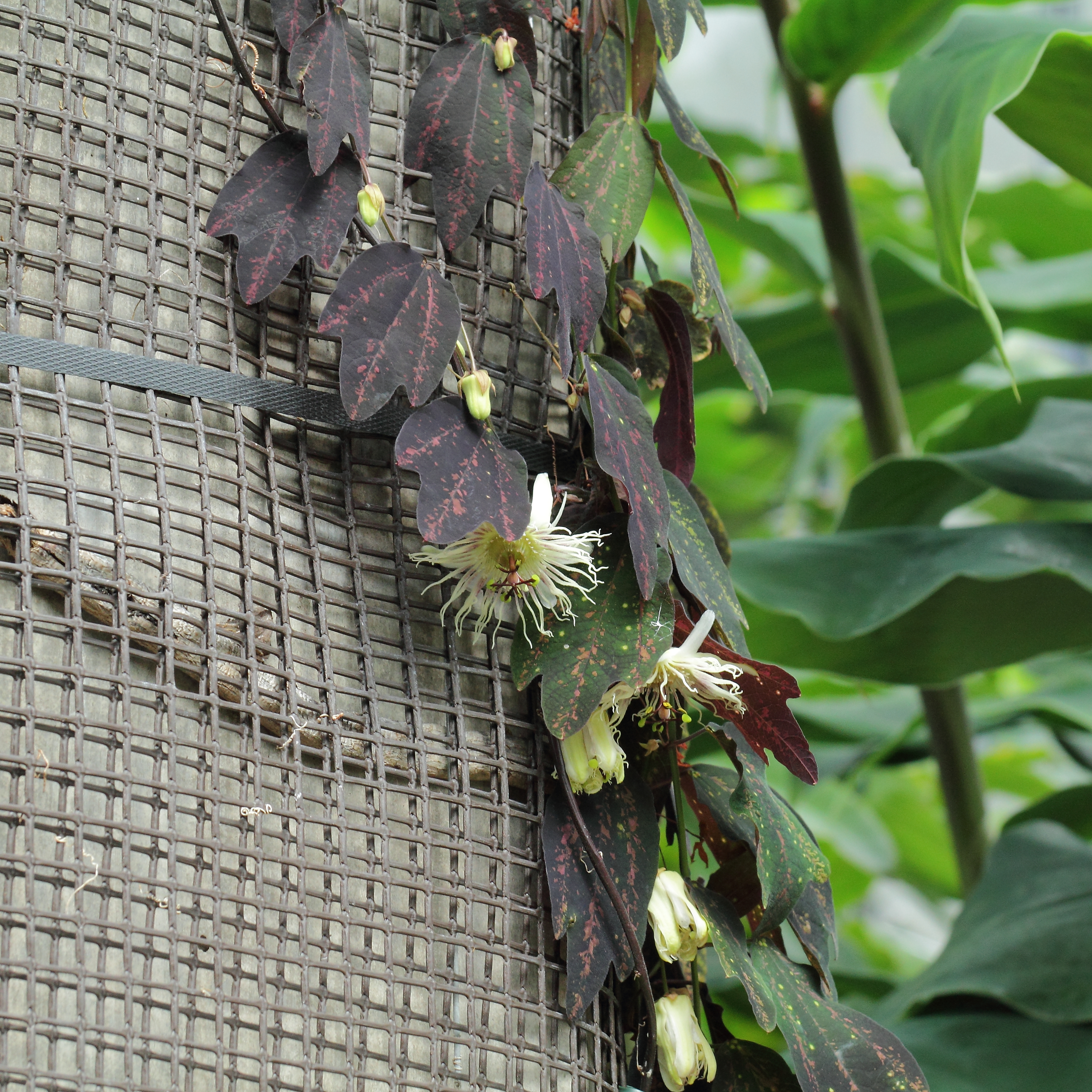
- at Kew Gardens

Conservation status
- Data Deficient (IUCN 3.1)

Scientific classification
- Kingdom: Plantae
- Clade: Tracheophytes
- Clade: Angiosperms
- Clade: Eudicots
- Clade: Rosids
- Order: Malpighiales
- Family: Passifloraceae
- Genus: Passiflora
- Species: P. telesiphe

Binomial name
- Passiflora telesiphe S.Knapp & Mallet

= Passiflora telesiphe =

Species of vine

Passiflora telesiphe is a species of flowering plant in the family Passifloraceae. It is endemic to Ecuador.

== Description ==
This is a vine with slender branches. The three-lobed leaves are up to 8 by 11 centimeters. The upper surface of the leaf is dark green, sometimes mottled with white, and the underside is purple. The flowers are solitary or paired with purple-tinged white petals. The filaments are white or purplish and are up to 2.6 centimeters long. The fruit has not been observed.

== Taxonomy ==
This plant was first formally described in 1998, when it was discovered in Ecuador five years earlier during an observation of local butterflies by naturalists. A male telesiphe longwing (Heliconius telesiphe) was noted hovering about a plant, and the eggs and pupa of the species were found on it. The new plant was then named after the butterfly. This species is a member of the subgenus Decaloba.

== Distribution and habitat ==
So far this plant is known only from Zamora-Chinchipe Province. It is found in low Andean forest habitat at elevations of 1,700m.
