= Athesis vitrala =

Scientific classification
- Kingdom: Animalia
- Phylum: Arthropoda
- Class: Insecta
- Order: Lepidoptera
- Family: Nymphalidae
- Genus: Athesis
- Species: A. vitrala

Binomial name
- Athesis vitrala Kaye, 1918

Synonyms
- Roswellia acrisione vitrala

Species of butterfly

Athesis vitrala is a species of butterfly of the family Nymphalidae. It is found in Peru.
