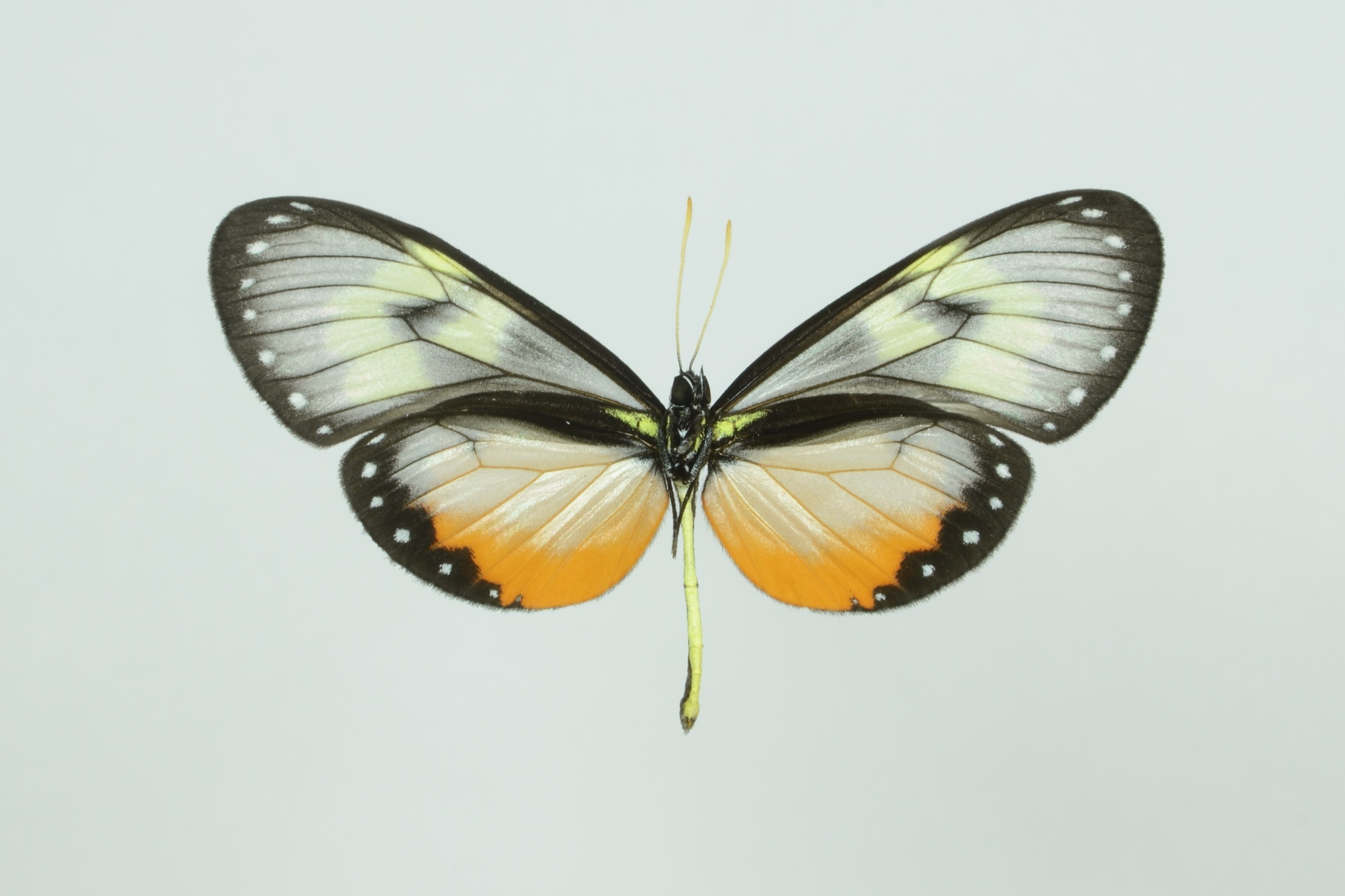
- Hyalyris coeno

Scientific classification
- Domain: Eukaryota
- Kingdom: Animalia
- Phylum: Arthropoda
- Class: Insecta
- Order: Lepidoptera
- Family: Nymphalidae
- Tribe: Ithomiini
- Genus: Hyalyris; Boisduval, 1870

Species
- See text

Synonyms
- Hyaliris Scudder, 1875; Oreogenes Stichel, 1899

= Hyalyris =

Genus of brush-footed butterflies

Hyalyris is a genus of clearwing (ithomiine) butterflies, named by Jean Baptiste Boisduval in 1870. They are in the brush-footed butterfly family, Nymphalidae.

== Species ==
Arranged alphabetically:

- Hyalyris antea (Hewitson, 1869)
- Hyalyris coeno (Doubleday, [1847])
- Hyalyris excelsa (C. & R. Felder, 1862)
- Hyalyris fiammetta (Hewitson, 1852)
- Hyalyris juninensis Fox & Real, 1971
- Hyalyris latilimbata (Weymer, 1890)
- Hyalyris leptalina (C. & R. Felder, 1865)
- Hyalyris mestra (Hopffer, 1874)
- Hyalyris ocna Herrich-Schäffer, 1865
- Hyalyris oulita (Hewitson, 1859)
- Hyalyris praxilla (Hewitson, 1870)
- Hyalyris schlingeri Real, 1971
