= Museo Civico di Storia Naturale di Trieste =

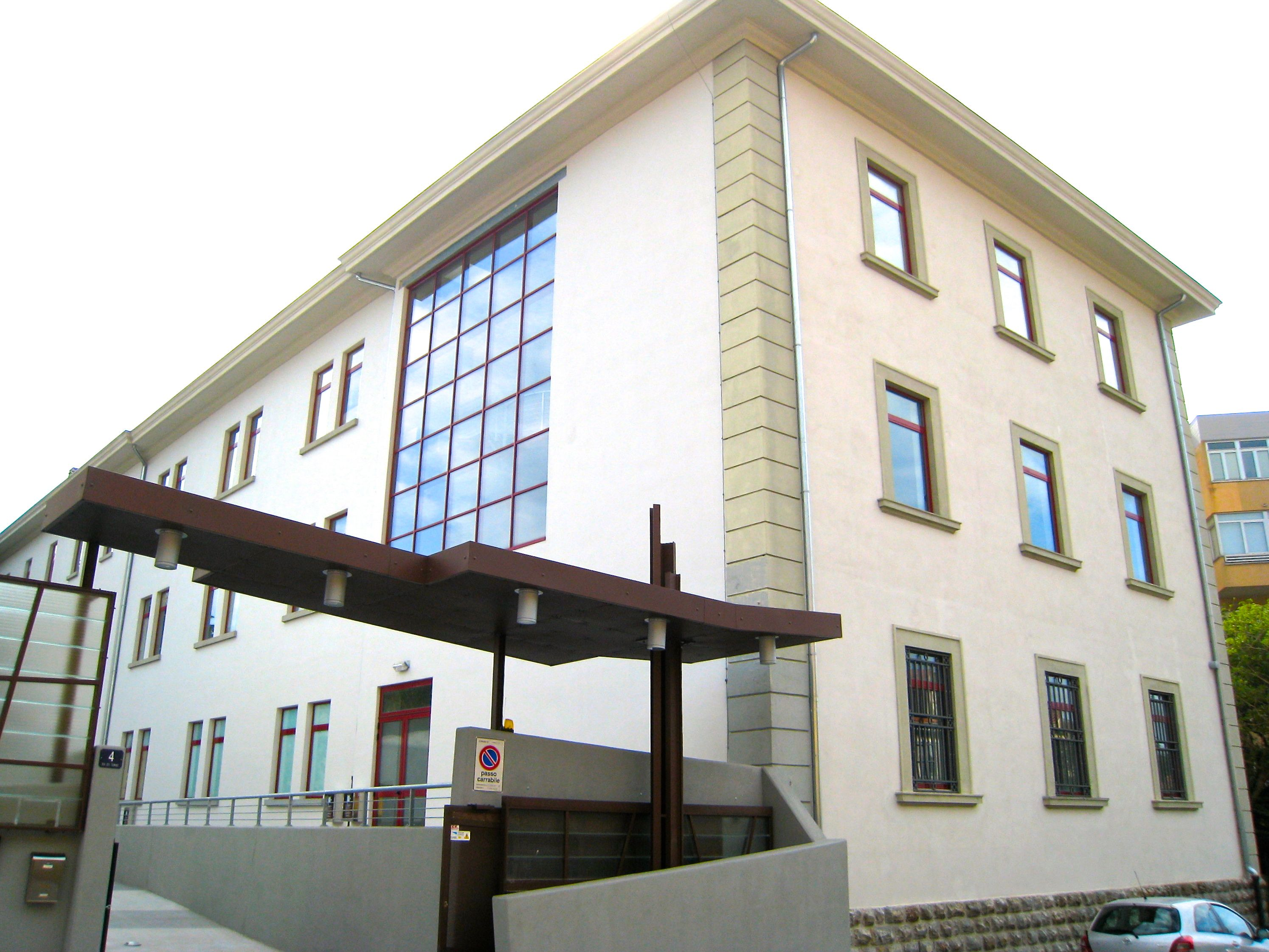
- Established: 1846
- Location: Via dei Tominz, 4 Trieste
- Coordinates: 45.640405°N 13.800529°E
- Type: Natural history museum
- Public transit access: 11, 22 buses
- Website: MuseodiStoriaNaturaleTrieste.it

Museo Civico di Storia Naturale di Trieste is a natural history museum in Trieste, northern Italy. It contains several collections, including more than two millions botanical, zoological, mineralogical, geological, and paleontological specimens.

== History ==
The museum was opened as a zoological museum in 1846 with the name "Gabinetto Zoologico Zootomico" and set in Palazzo Biserini in Piazza Hortis (ex Piazza Lipsia) in 1852, where it has coexisted with the Civic Library and the literary museums until 2010. In 1855, under the protectorate of Archduke Ferdinand Maximilian, the museum was renamed "Civico Museo Ferdinand Maximilian". Through many donations and as a result of several international expeditions (such as the Novara frigate), the museum has developed a range of exhibits. While keeping a zoological address, it now has flora, geological, and paleontological specimens and a large library containing works in various languages.

In 2010, the museum moved to the new headquarters in via Cumano (entrance from via dei Tominz 4), next to Civico Museo della Guerra per la Pace Diego de Henriquez, which is part of an only museum centre.

=== Curators and Directors ===
Heinrich Koch - Honorary Director (1846–1852)

Heinrich Freyer - Curator (1852–1864)

Adamo Simeone de Syrski - Director (1866–1876)

Charles de Marchesetti - Director (1876–1921)

Mario Stenta - Director (1921–1928)

Giuseppe Müller - Director (1928–1945)

Edoardo Gridelli - Curator (1945–1957)

Renato Mezzena - (1960–1987)

Sergio Dolce - (1990–2010)

== The collections ==
=== Botany ===
Botanical collection contains over 1,500,000 specimens, including herbaria of vascular plant from Italy and, especially, Friuli-Venezia Giulia, in addition to seaweed, moss, wood, seed, and fruit collections. All the sections have the name of the scientist who carried out the collection.

=== Zoology ===
Zoological collections consist of several parts:

- a fish collection, that contains marine and freshwater fishes, mostly preserved in a liquid environment. The collection includes the Carlotta shark, a specimen of white shark (Carcharodon carcharias) fished in Kvarner Gulf in 1906, which is the biggest shark conserved in a European museum;
- a herpetological collection, that contains reptiles and amphibians from all over the world, especially from Venezia Giulia and Dalmatia;
- an ornithological collection that contains over 5,000 specimens of 550 different bird species, including rarities such as New Zealand kākāpō, Mexican Quetzal, and New Guinea Birds of paradise.
- an entomological collection, that contains over 500,000 specimens from Friuli-Venezia Giulia, Slovenia, and other European and extra-European places. This collection includes specimens of hypogean insects from Karst caves. The curator of the entomological collection is Andrea Colla.

=== Paleontology ===
Paleontological collections consist of a historic collection and new additions. The 19th century collection includes fish and leaf fossils from Bolca, Eocene specimens from Istria, and Late Cretaceous specimens from the Karst, such as fish and reptilian fossils from Komen (Slovenia). The collection also contains 300 fish and nine reptiles, including Carsosaurus marchesettii and Adriosaurus microbrachis. Among Quaternary specimens, the fossils from breccia di Slivia and the specimens of cave bear (Ursus spelaeus) from Caverna Pocala (TS) are the most important. New addictions include fossils from Villaggio del Pescatore paleontological site. Among these, Antonio dinosaur, a specimen of Tethyshadros insularis dated 75 million years ago, is the most important exhibit of the museum.

The museum includes an exhibition hall referred to as human evolution. This hall contains the Lonche mandible, a human mandible dated 6400 years ago. It is the first archaeological evidence of a dental filling treated with some substance, in this case, beeswax.

=== Mineralogy ===
Mineralogical collection includes thousands of exhibits, mostly from the former Austro-Hungarian Empire and Italy. In addition, core sampling from Grotta Pocala (TS) and Borgo Grotta Gigante are part of the collection.

== The Halls ==
=== Wunderkammer ===
"Wunderkammer is a place where a collection of curiosities and rarities is exhibited". The museum has a hall dedicated to the original "Cabinet of Curiosities" that was established in 1846. The museum states on its official website that the hall is "a fundamental nucleus of any museum".

=== The Scientific Cabinet ===
The Scientific Cabinet showcases the Enlightenment Period from the late 1700s. Its exhibits include apothecary stations, alchemist labs, and the natural sciences.

=== Fossilization ===
This hall is referred to palaeontology in the Province of Trieste. Through its exhibits, the hall teaches visitors how fossilization occurs, both in a water environment and in a terrestrial environment. The hall contains a showcase with Rudists, ancient marine bivalves living on the sea bottom became extinct 65 million years ago, which are the most common fossils in Karst calcareous rocks. Another showcase displays how the Province of Trieste and, especially, the Karst have developed from the geopaleontologic point of view. The last part of the hall refers to the Villaggio del Pescatore paleontological site.

=== Antonio ===
This hall contains the dinosaur called Antonio (Tethyshadros insularis), a hadrosauroid dinosaur dated 75 million years ago, discovered in Villaggio del Pescatore paleontological site. It is one of the most complete dinosaurs that have been collected. 4-meters long and 1.3-meters tall, Tethyshadros lived on an island in the Western part of Tethys Ocean, between Africa and Northern Europe.

The hall includes other dinosaur exhibits from the same locality: front legs, a vertebra, a pelvis bone, and a skull. A showcase displays the linked fauna: fishes, crocodiles, shrimps, a pterosaur bone, and maybe a theropod one.

=== The Food Chain ===
This hall consists of three rooms. The first two rooms contain a parade of animals corresponding to their place in the food chain. The third room takes visitors into the city to observe the food chain and inner workings in a modern setting.
