= Edward Doubleday =

English entomologist and ornithologist

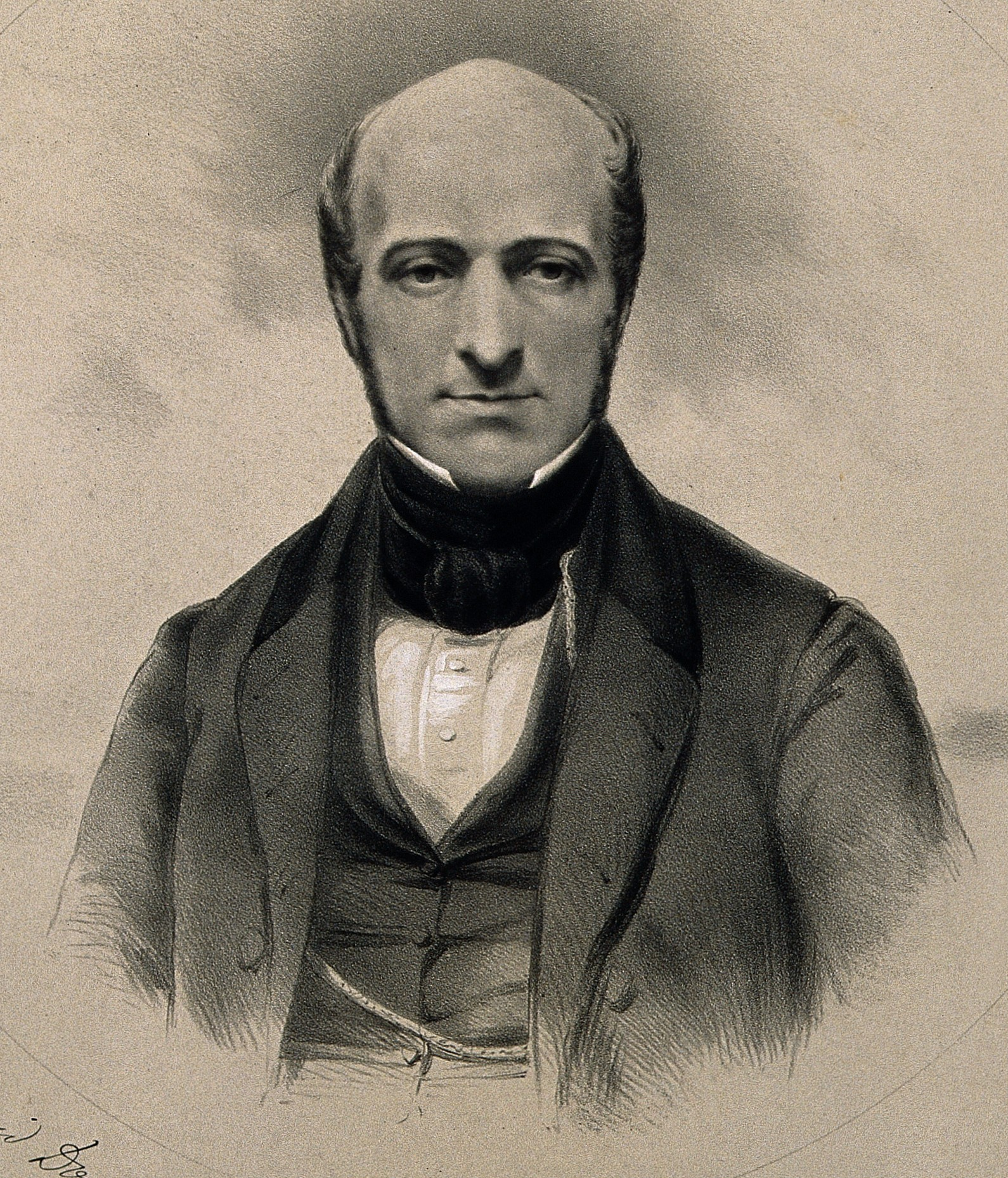
- Portrait by George Henry Ford
- Born: 9 October 1810; Epping, Essex, England
- Died: 14 December 1849 (aged 39)
- Known for: List of the Specimens of Lepidopterous Insects in the Collection of the British Museum
- Parent(s): Benjamin and Mary Doubleday
- Relatives: Henry Doubleday (brother)
- Scientific career
- Fields: Entomologist
- Workplaces: British Museum

Edward Doubleday (9 October 1810 – 14 December 1849) was an English entomologist primarily interested in Lepidoptera. He is best known for The Genera of Diurnal Lepidoptera: Comprising Their Generic Characters, a Notice of Their Habits and Transformations, and a Catalogue of the Species of Each Genus, co-written with John O. Westwood, and illustrated by William Chapman Hewitson; and List of the Specimens of Lepidopterous Insects in the Collection of the British Museum.

Doubleday was born on 9 October 1810 in Epping, Essex, the second son of Benjamin and Mary Doubleday. His older brother was Henry Doubleday who also grew up to become a notable entomologist. They were both interested in natural history and spent their childhood collecting specimens in the nearby Epping Forest. The boys grew up in a Quaker family and Edward received a good classical education at the local Quaker school.

In 1837, he joined a fellow Quaker named Robert Foster on a trip to the United States, and while there wrote a series of letters that appeared in the Entomological Magazine in London under the running title of "Communications on the Natural History of North America". He spent much time in upstate New York where he and Foster collected numerous insects, including half a dozen stoneflies new to science that Edward Newman, yet another Quaker, described and named in a paper in the Entomological Magazine. Doubleday also collected in other parts of the country including Kentucky where he was struck by the verdant beauty of the landscape. He spent about two years in the United States and amassed a significant collection of insects, much of which he shipped to the British Museum and other scientific institutions in England.

Upon his return to England, Doubleday tried for an appointment to the ill-fated Niger expedition of 1841. When he was turned down he accepted a position with the British Museum where he built one of the most comprehensive butterfly collections at that time. He remained at the museum until he died on 14 December 1849. As Robert Mays, author of the book Henry Doubleday: The Epping Naturalist wrote: "Had Edward lived longer his name would undoubtedly have found a place beside those of the eminent 19th century entomologists".
