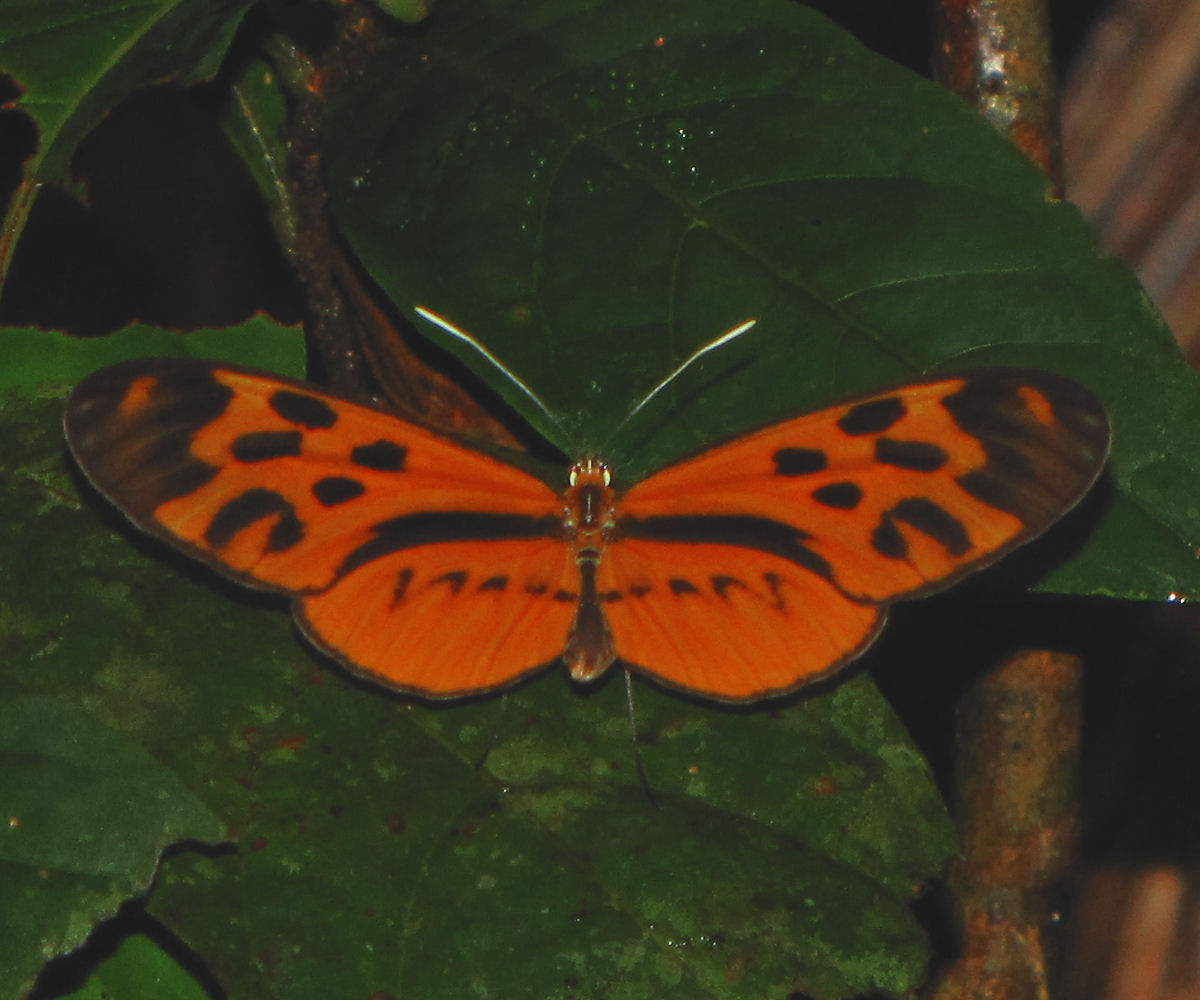
- Dorsal view
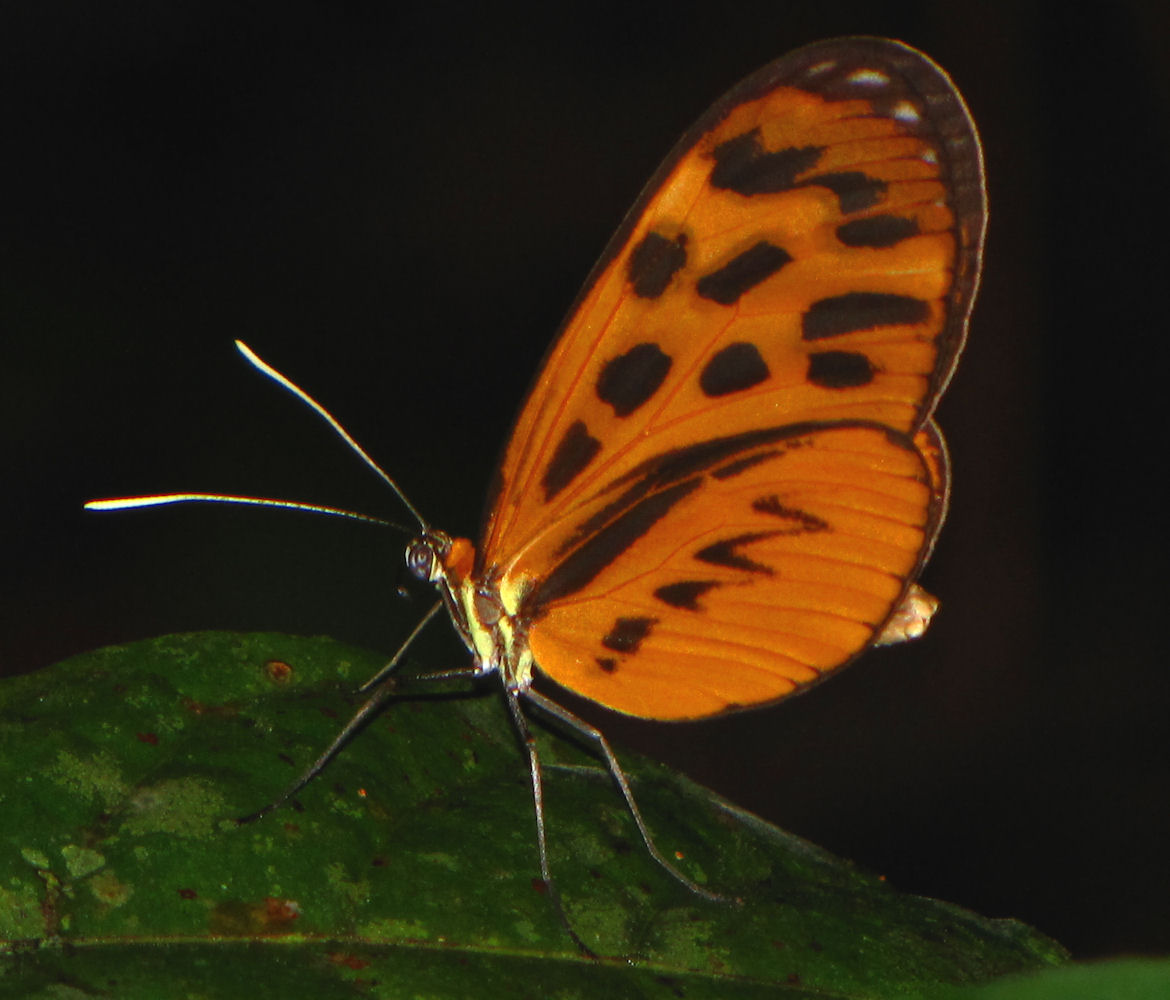
- Ventral view

Scientific classification
- Kingdom: Animalia
- Phylum: Arthropoda
- Class: Insecta
- Order: Lepidoptera
- Family: Nymphalidae
- Genus: Forbestra
- Species: F. olivencia

Binomial name
- Forbestra olivencia (Bates, 1862)

Synonyms
- Mechanitis olivencia Bates, 1862; Mechanitis huallaga Staudinger, [1884]; Mechanitis huallaga ab. jurimaguensis Staudinger, 1885

= Forbestra olivencia =

Olivencia tigerwing

Species of butterfly

Forbestra olivencia, the Olivencia tigerwing, is a species of butterfly of the family Nymphalidae. It is found in Brazil, Peru, and Ecuador.

== Subspecies ==
- F. o. olivencia (Brazil: Amazonas, Peru)
- F. o. juntana (Haensch, 1903) (Ecuador)
- F. o. oiticicai (d'Almeida, 1951) (Brazil: Pará)
- F. o. aeneola Fox, 1967 (Peru)
- F. o. truncata (Butler, 1867) (Brazil: Amazonas)
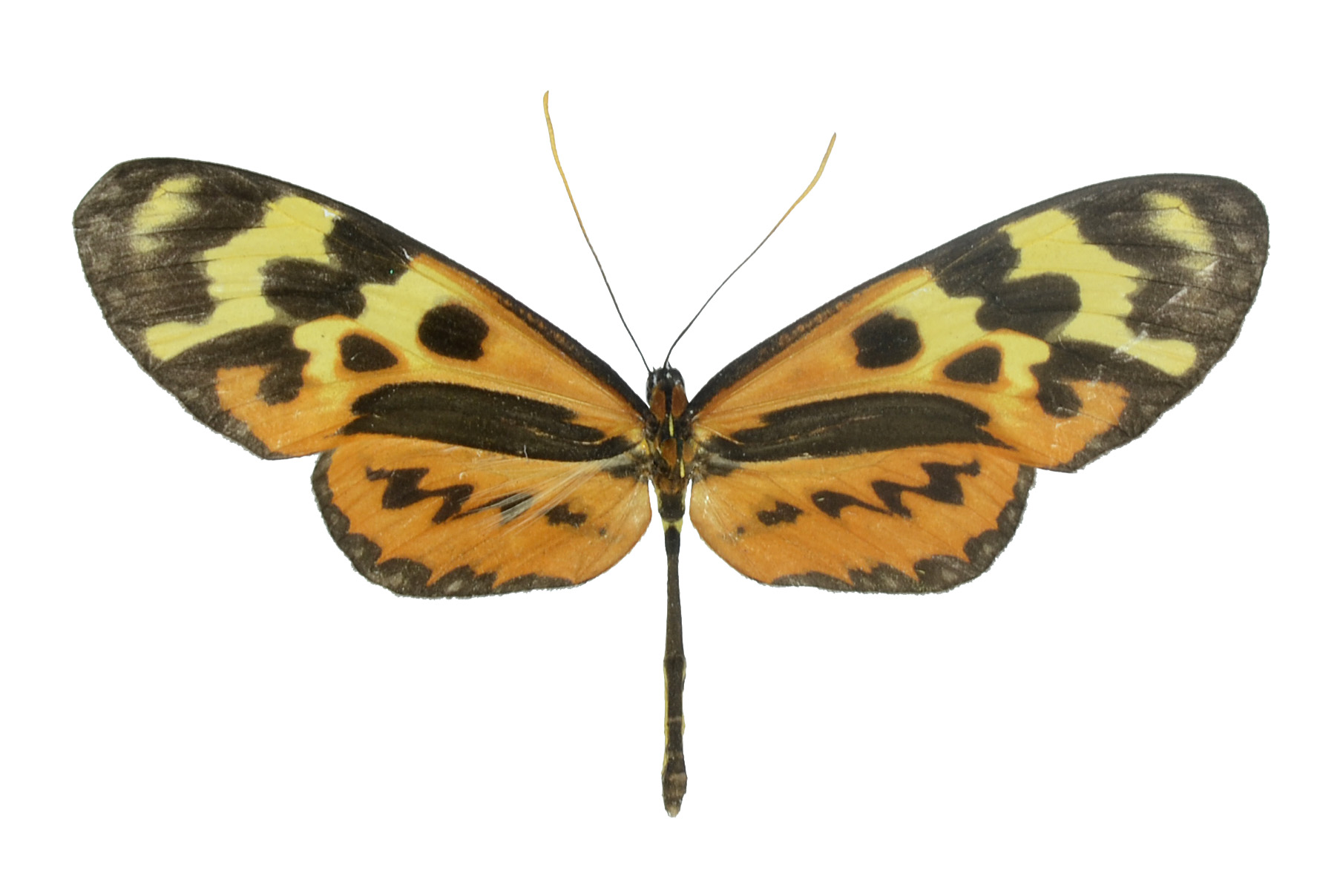
F. o. olivencia, dorsal view

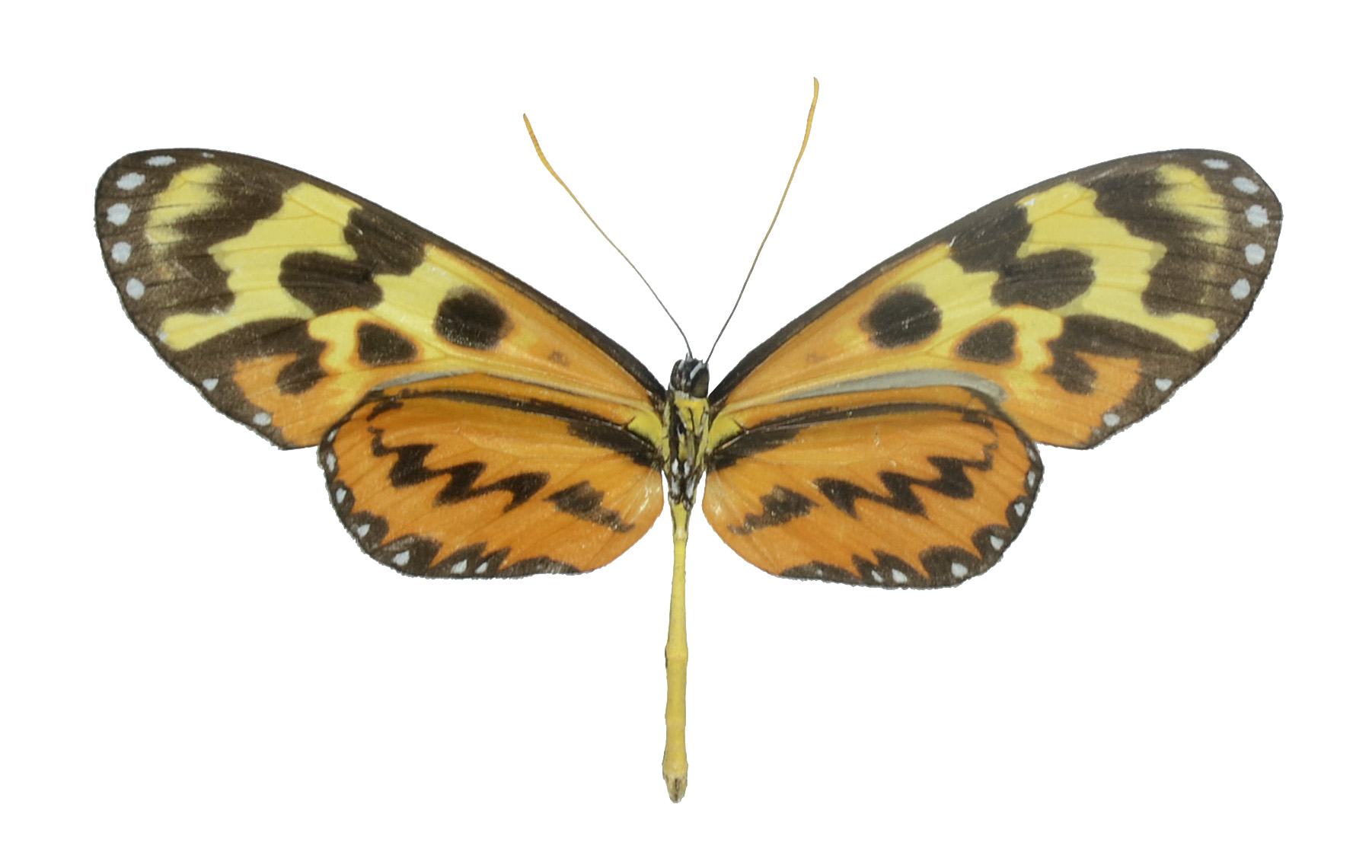
F. o. olivencia, ventral view
