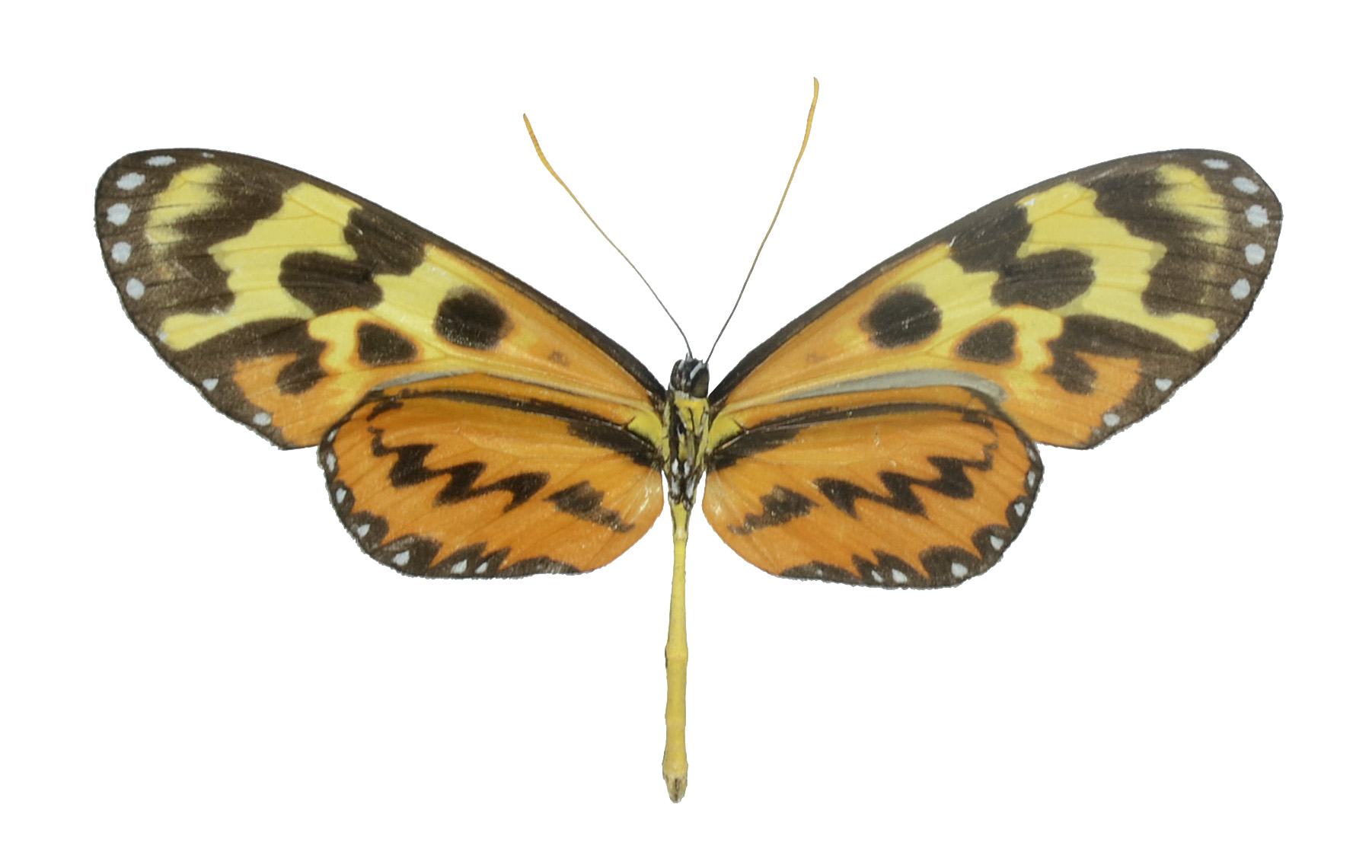
- Forbestra olivencia

Scientific classification
- Domain: Eukaryota
- Kingdom: Animalia
- Phylum: Arthropoda
- Class: Insecta
- Order: Lepidoptera
- Family: Nymphalidae
- Tribe: Ithomiini
- Genus: Forbestra; Fox, 1967

Species
- See text

= Forbestra =

Genus of brush-footed butterflies

Forbestra is a genus of clearwing (ithomiine) butterflies, named by Fox in 1967. They are in the brush-footed butterfly family, Nymphalidae.

== Species ==
Arranged alphabetically.

- Forbestra equicola (Cramer, [1780])
- Forbestra olivencia (Bates, 1862)
- Forbestra proceris (Weymer, 1883)
