= Velamysta =

- Velamysta peninna figure 211; Velamysta pupilla figure 212; Veladyris pardalis figure 214

Scientific classification
- Kingdom: Animalia
- Phylum: Arthropoda
- Clade: Pancrustacea
- Class: Insecta
- Order: Lepidoptera
- Family: Nymphalidae
- Tribe: Ithomiini
- Genus: Velamysta; Haensch, 1909

Species
- See text

Genus of brush-footed butterflies

Velamysta is a genus of clearwing (ithomiine) butterflies, named by Richard Haensch in 1909. They are in the brush-footed butterfly family, Nymphalidae.

== Species ==
Arranged alphabetically:

- Velamysta peninna (Hewitson, 1855)
- Velamysta phengites Fox, 1945
- Velamysta pupilla (Hewitson, 1874)
