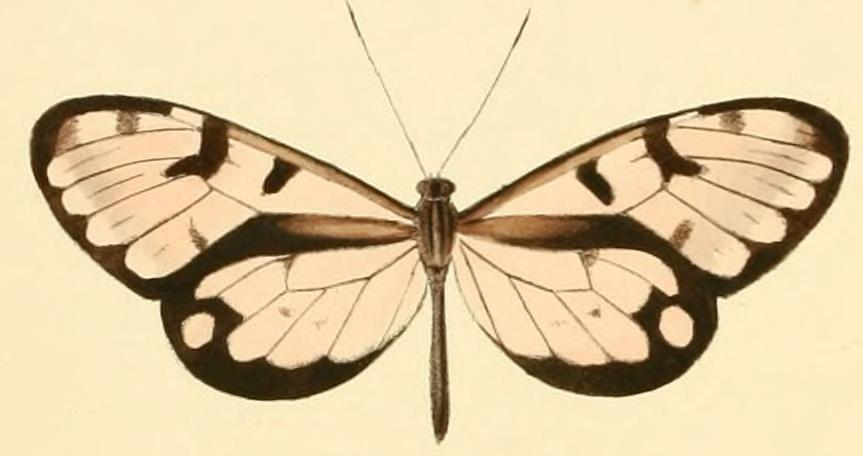

Scientific classification
- Kingdom: Animalia
- Phylum: Arthropoda
- Class: Insecta
- Order: Lepidoptera
- Family: Nymphalidae
- Genus: Velamysta
- Species: V. peninna

Binomial name
- Velamysta peninna (Hewitson, 1855)

Synonyms
- Ithomia peninna Hewitson, 1855

= Velamysta peninna =

Species of butterfly

Velamysta peninna is a species of butterfly of the family Nymphalidae. It is found in Bolivia and Peru.

== Subspecies ==
- Velamysta peninna peninna (Bolivia)
- Velamysta peninna new subspecies (Peru)
