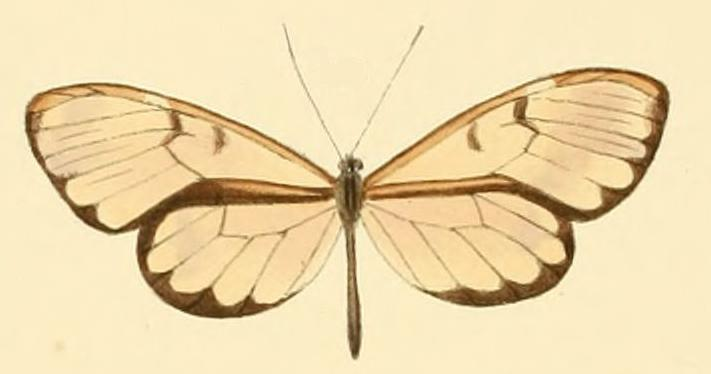

Scientific classification
- Kingdom: Animalia
- Phylum: Arthropoda
- Class: Insecta
- Order: Lepidoptera
- Family: Nymphalidae
- Genus: Velamysta
- Species: V. pupilla

Binomial name
- Velamysta pupilla (Hewitson, 1874)

Synonyms
- Ithomia pupilla Hewitson, 1874; Ithomia cruxifera Hewitson, 1877; Hypoleria veronica Weymer, 1899

= Velamysta pupilla =

Species of butterfly

Velamysta pupilla is a species of butterfly of the family Nymphalidae. It is found in Bolivia, Colombia and Ecuador.

== Subspecies ==
- Velamysta pupilla pupilla (Bolivia)
- Velamysta pupilla anomala (Staudinger, [1884]) (Colombia)
- Velamysta pupilla cruxifera (Hewitson, 1877) (Ecuador)
- Velamysta pupilla greeneyi Vitale & Bollino, 2003 (Ecuador)
- Velamysta pupilla veronica (Weymer, 1899) (Colombia)
