= Lepidoptera in the 10th edition of Systema Naturae =

Classification of arthropods

In the 10th edition of Systema Naturae, Carl Linnaeus classified the arthropods, including insects, arachnids and crustaceans, among his class "Insecta". Butterflies and moths were brought together under the name Lepidoptera. Linnaeus divided the group into three genera – Papilio, Sphinx and Phalaena. The first two, together with the seven subdivisions of the third, are now used as the basis for nine superfamily names: Papilionoidea, Sphingoidea, Bombycoidea, Noctuoidea, Geometroidea, Tortricoidea, Pyraloidea, Tineoidea and Alucitoidea.

== Themes ==
When naming the nearly 200 species of butterflies known to him at the time, Linnaeus used names from classical mythology as specific names. These were thematically arranged into six groups, and were drawn from classical sources including the Fabulae of Gaius Julius Hyginus and Pliny the Elder's Naturalis Historia. The first such group was the Equites, or knights, which were divided into the Equites Trojani (Trojan army) and Equites Achivi (Achaean army), and between them named most of the figures involved in the Trojan War. The second group was the Heliconii, comprising Apollo and Muses. The third group was the Danai, divided into the Danai Candidi and the Danai Festivi, representing the Danaids and their husbands. The fourth group was the Nymphales, or nymphs, divided into the Nymphales gemmati and the Nymphales phalerati, on the basis of the insects' wing markings. The fifth group, the Plebeji, were divided into Plebeji Rurales and Plebeji Urbicolae. There is little thematic connection between their names. The final group was the Barbari, or Argonauts.

== Papilio (butterflies) ==
(Note: The current names of all Linnaeus' Papilio species are taken from Honey & Scoble (2008).)

=== Equites Trojani ===
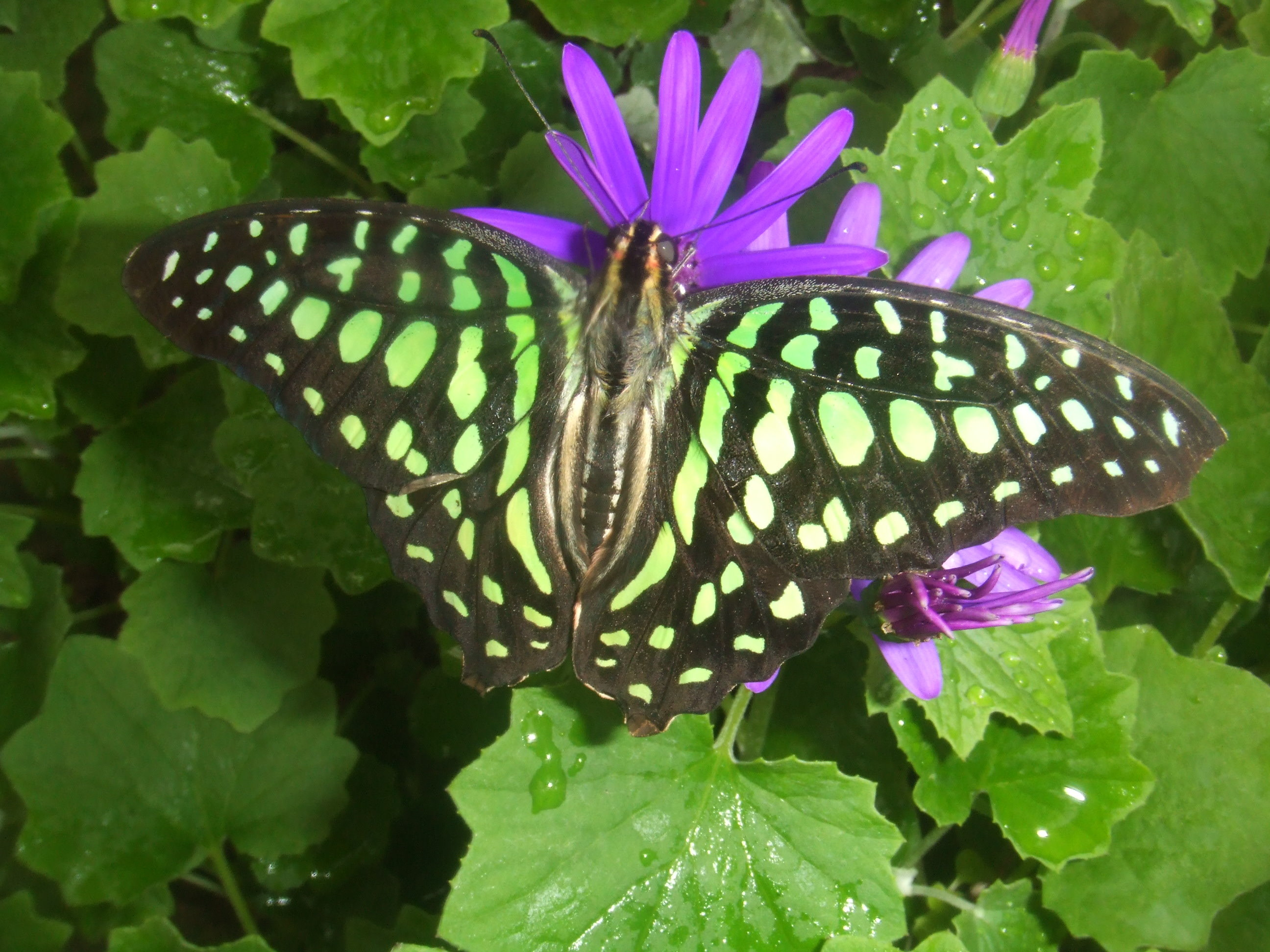
The name of Graphium agamemnon (originally Papilio agamemnon) commemorates Agamemnon.

- Papilio priamus – Ornithoptera priamus
- Papilio hector – Pachliopta hector
- Papilio paris – Papilio paris
- Papilio helenus – Papilio helenus
- Papilio troilus – Papilio troilus, spicebush swallowtail
- Papilio deiphobus – Papilio deiphobus
- Papilio polytes – Papilio polytes, common Mormon
- Papilio pammon – Papilio polytes
- Papilio glaucus – Papilio glaucus, eastern tiger swallowtail
- Papilio anchises – Parides anchises
- Papilio polydamas – Battus polydamas
- Papilio memnon – Papilio memnon, great Mormon
- Papilio agenor – subspecies of Papilio memnon, great Mormon
- Papilio sarpedon – Graphium sarpedon
- Papilio aeneas – Parides aeneas
- Papilio panthous – Ornithoptera priamus
- Papilio pandarus – Hypolimnas pandarus

=== Equites Achivi ===
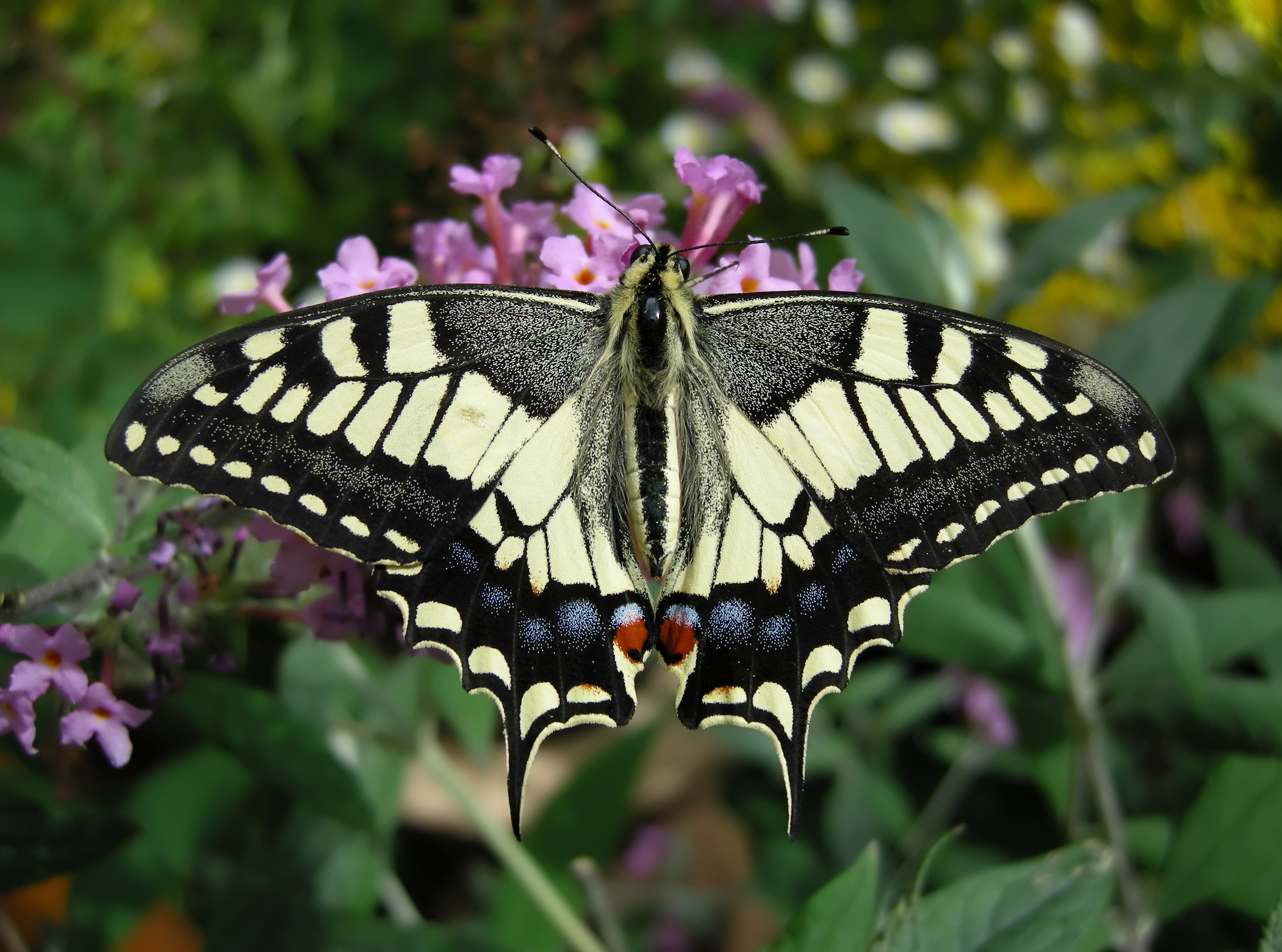
The Old World swallowtail was named Papilio machaon, after Machaon.

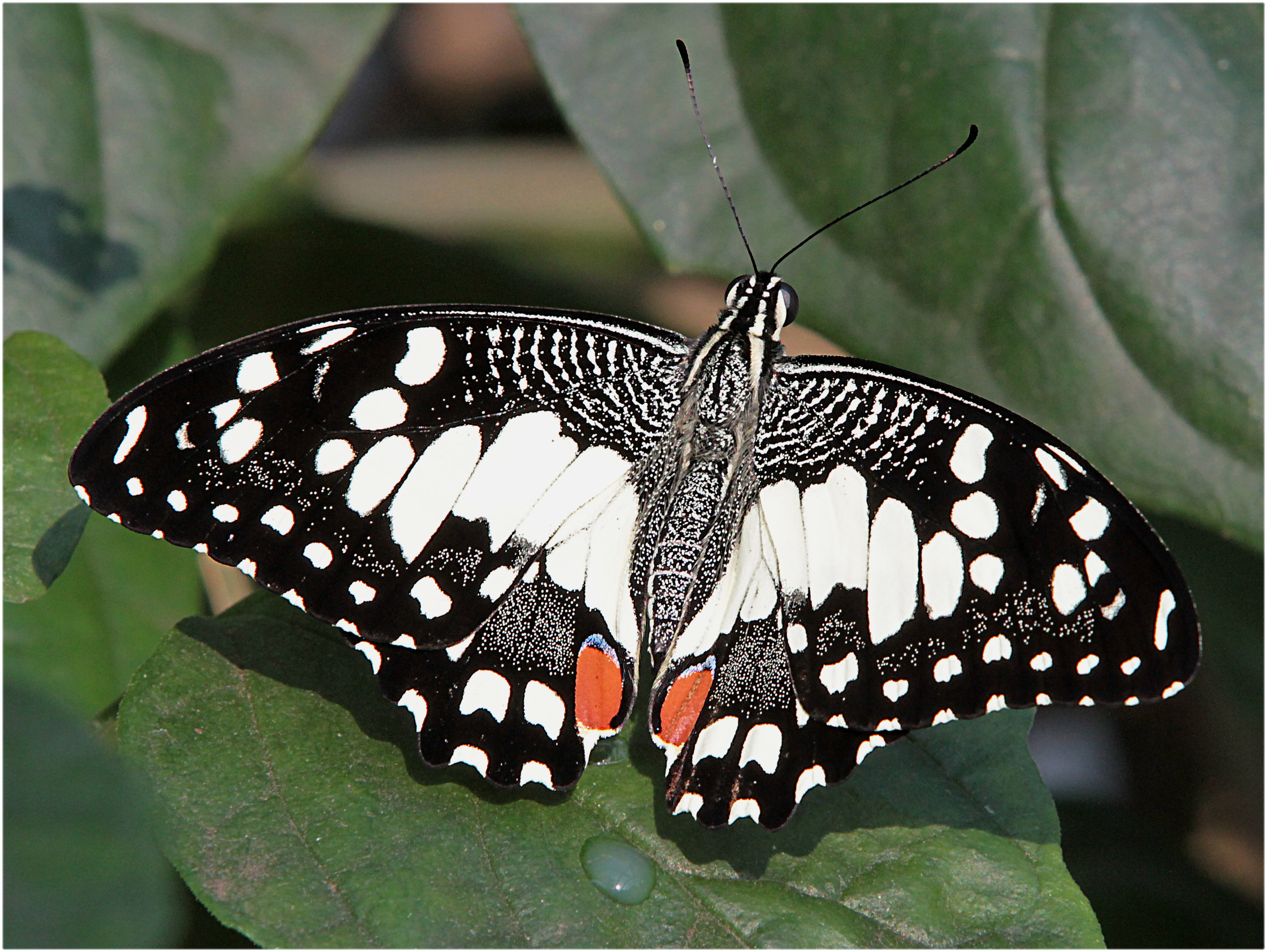
The common lime butterfly was named Papilio demoleus in 1758.

- Papilio helena – Troides helena
- Papilio menelaus – Morpho menelaus
- Papilio ulysses – Papilio ulysses
- Papilio agamemnon – Graphium agamemnon
- Papilio diomedes – Papilio ulysses
- Papilio patroclus – Lyssa patroclus (a moth)
- Papilio pyrrhus – Polyura pyrrhus
- Papilio leilus – Urania leilus (a moth)
- Papilio ajax – [rejected]
- Papilio machaon – Papilio machaon, Old World swallowtail
- Papilio antilochus – Papilio glaucus
- Papilio protesilaus – Protesilaus protesilaus
- Papilio nestor – Morpho menelaus
- Papilio telemachus – Morpho telemachus
- Papilio achilles – Morpho achilles
- Papilio podalirius – Iphiclides podalirius
- Papilio teucer – Caligo teucer
- Papilio idomeneus – Caligo idomeneus
- Papilio demoleus – Papilio demoleus
- Papilio demophon – Archaeoprepona demophon
- Papilio eurypylus – Graphium eurypylus
- Papilio nireus – Papilio nireus
- Papilio stelenes – Siproeta stelenes
- Papilio philoctetes – Antirrhea philoctetes

=== Heliconii ===
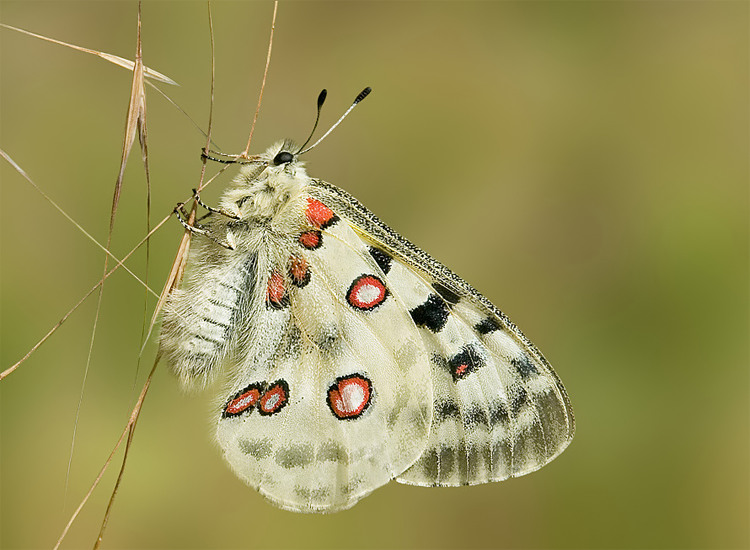
The Apollo was named Papilio apollo, after Apollo.

- Papilio apollo – Parnassius apollo, Apollo
- Papilio mnemosyne – Parnassius mnemosyne, clouded Apollo
- Papilio piera – Haetera piera
- Papilio aglaja – [rejected]
- Papilio terpsicore – [nomen dubium]
- Papilio calliope – Stalachtis calliope
- Papilio polymnia – Mechanitis polymnia
- Papilio urania – Taenaris urania
- Papilio euterpe – Stalachtis euterpe
- Papilio ricini – Heliconius ricini
- Papilio psidii – Thyridia psidii
- Papilio clio – Eresia clio
- Papilio thalia – Actinote thalia
- Papilio erato – Heliconius doris
- Papilio melpomene – Heliconius melpomene

=== Danai candidi ===
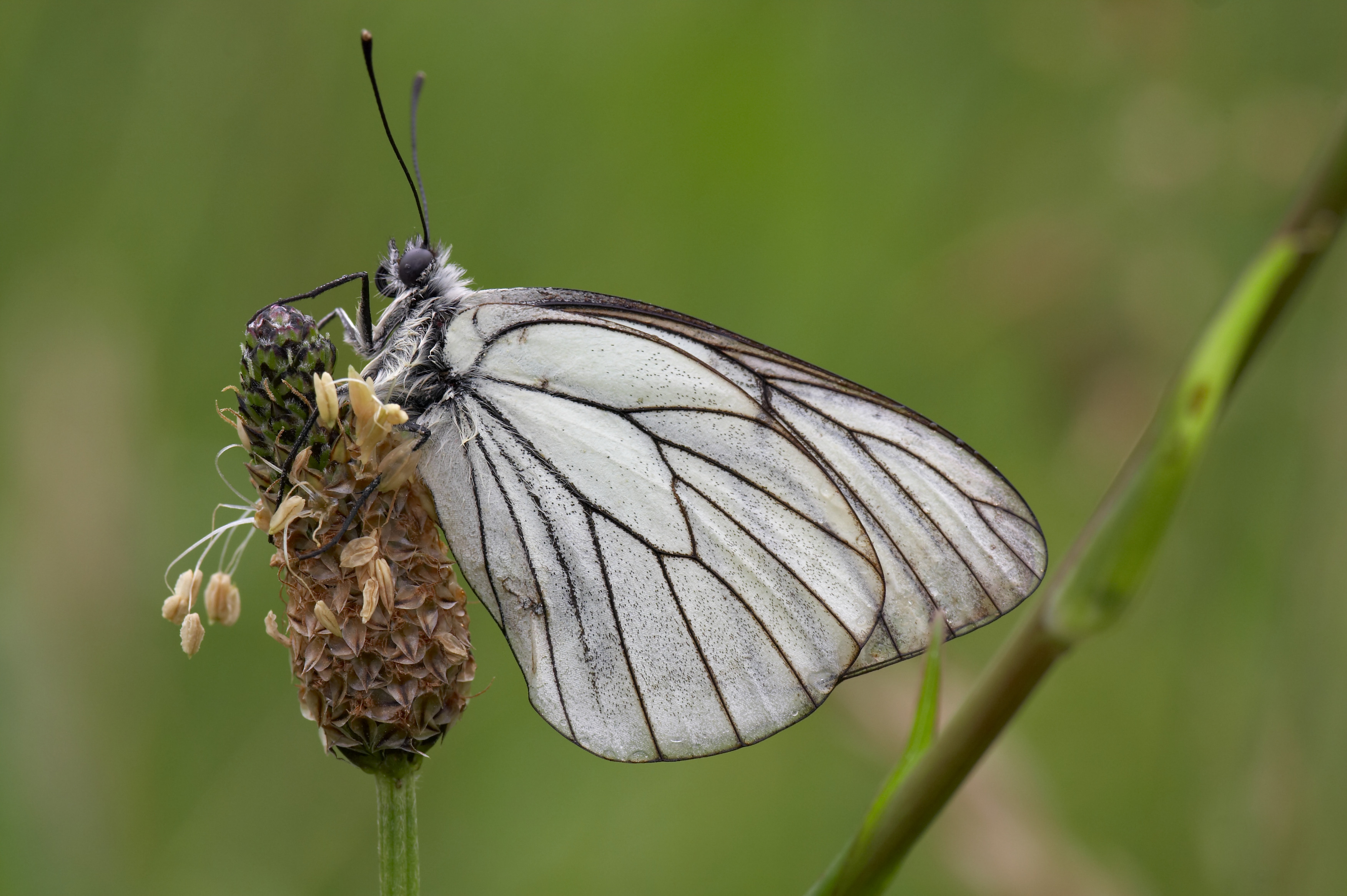
The black-veined white was named Papilio crataegi after the hawthorn bushes it feeds on.

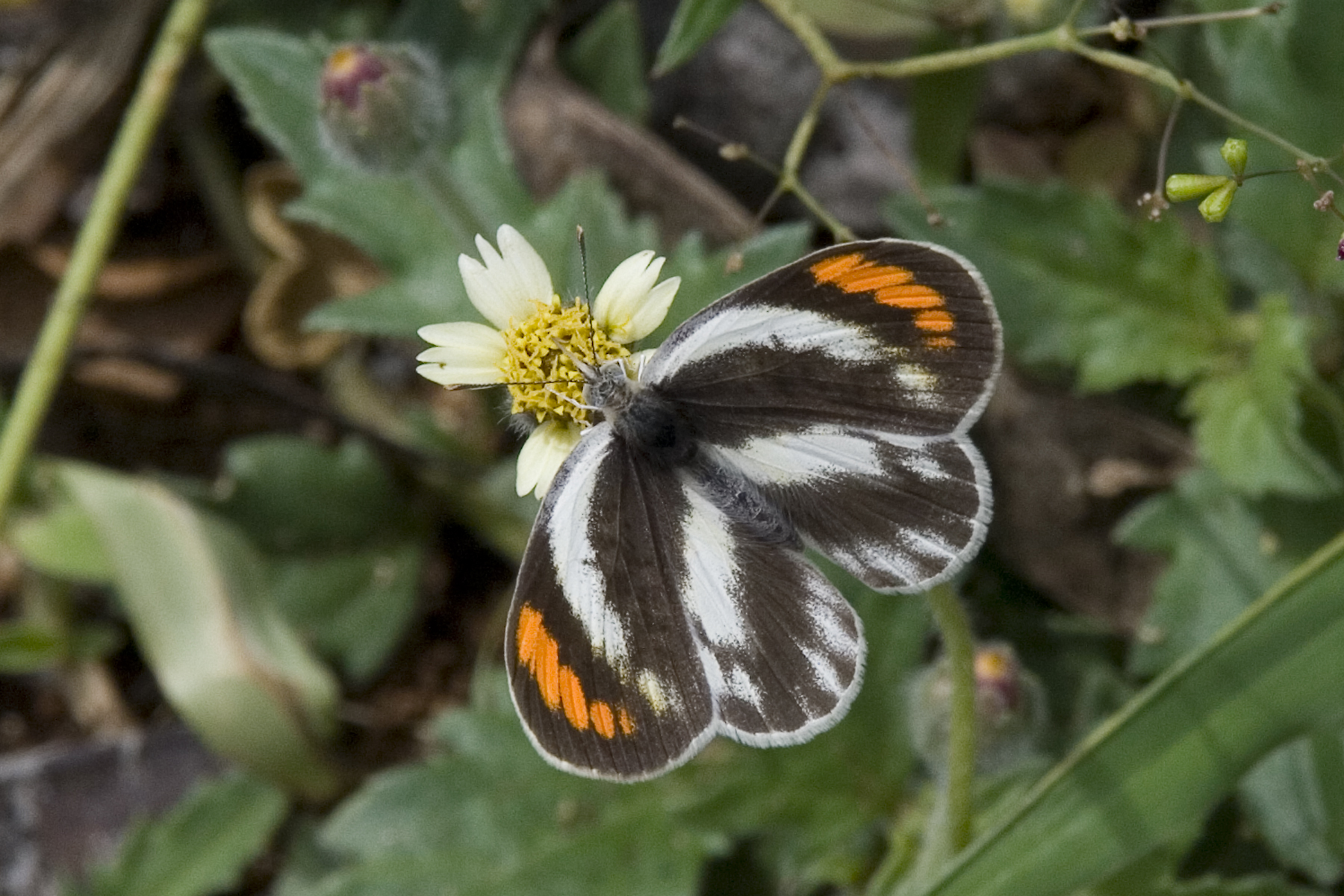
The round-winged orange tip was named Papilio euippe, after Euippe.

- Papilio anacardii – Protogoniomorpha anacardii
- Papilio crataegi – Aporia crataegi, black-veined white
- Papilio brassicae – Pieris brassicae, large white
- Papilio rapae – Pieris rapae, small white
- Papilio napi – Pieris napi, green-veined white
- Papilio sinapis – Leptidea sinapis, wood white
- Papilio daplidice – Pontia daplidice, Bath white
- Papilio cardamines – Anthocharis cardamines, orange tip
- Papilio euippe – Colotis euippe, round-winged orange tip
- Papilio glaucippe – Hebomoia glaucippe
- Papilio pyranthe – Catopsilia pyranthe
- Papilio arsalte – Heliopetes arsalte
- Papilio hyparete – Delias hyparete
- Papilio damone – [nomen dubium]
- Papilio trite – Rhabdodryas trite
- Papilio hyale – Colias hyale, pale clouded yellow
- Papilio sennae – Phoebis sennae, cloudless sulphur
- Papilio rhamni – Gonepteryx rhamni, common brimstone
- Papilio hecabe – Eurema hecabe

=== Danai festivi ===
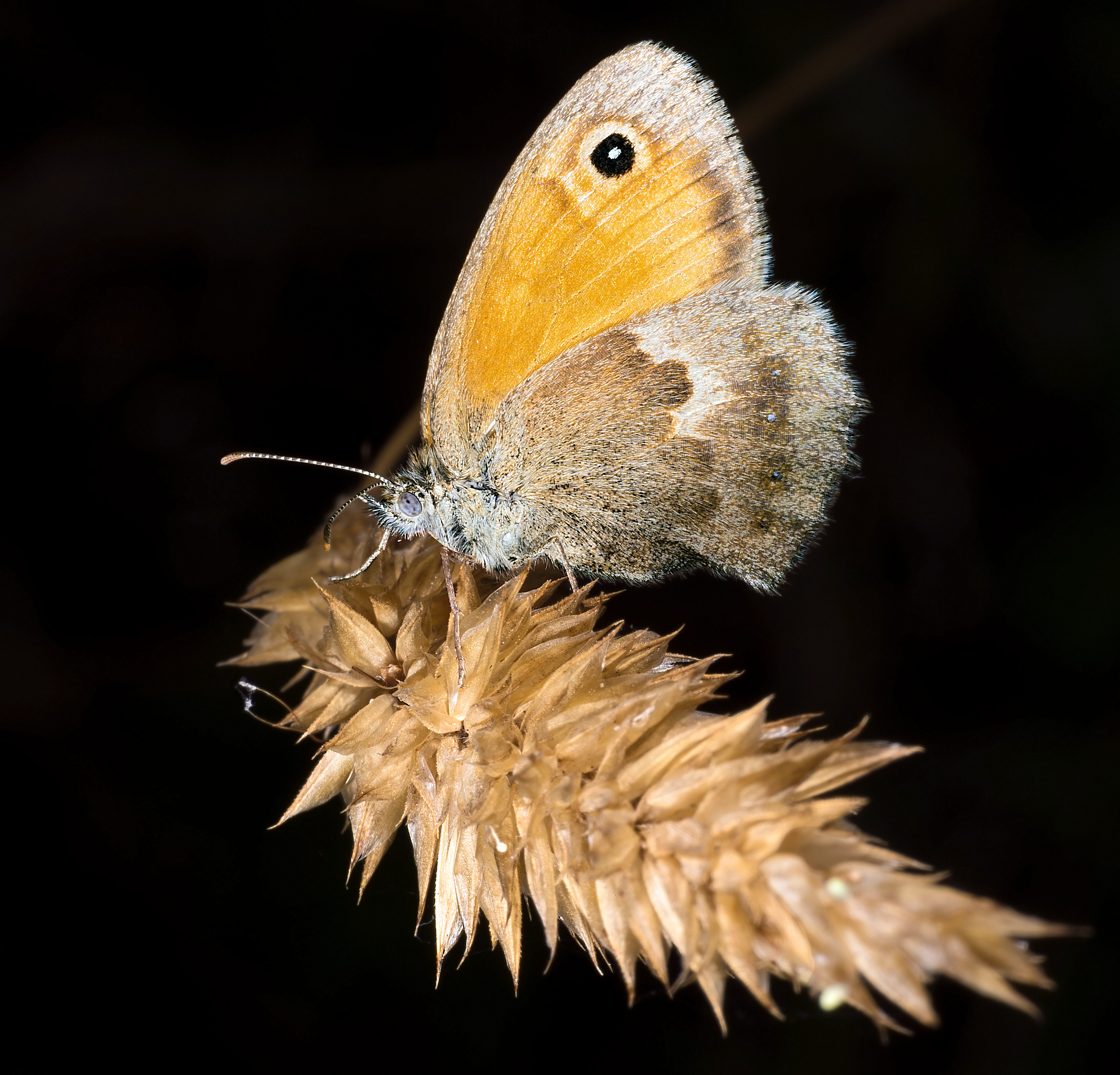
The small heath was named Papilio pamphilus, after Pamphilus.

- Papilio midamus – Euploea midamus
- Papilio niavius – Amauris niavius
- Papilio enceladus – [nomen dubium]
- Papilio obrinus – Nessaea obrinus
- Papilio perius – Parathyma perius
- Papilio plexippus – Danaus plexippus, monarch
- Papilio chrysippus – Danaus chrysippus
- Papilio cassiae – Opsiphanes cassiae
- Papilio sophorae – Brassolis sophorae
- Papilio mineus – Mycalesis mineus
- Papilio hyperantus – Aphantopus hyperantus, the ringlet
- Papilio pamphilus – Coenonympha pamphilus, small heath
- Papilio xanthus – Catoblepia xanthus

=== Nymphales gemmati ===
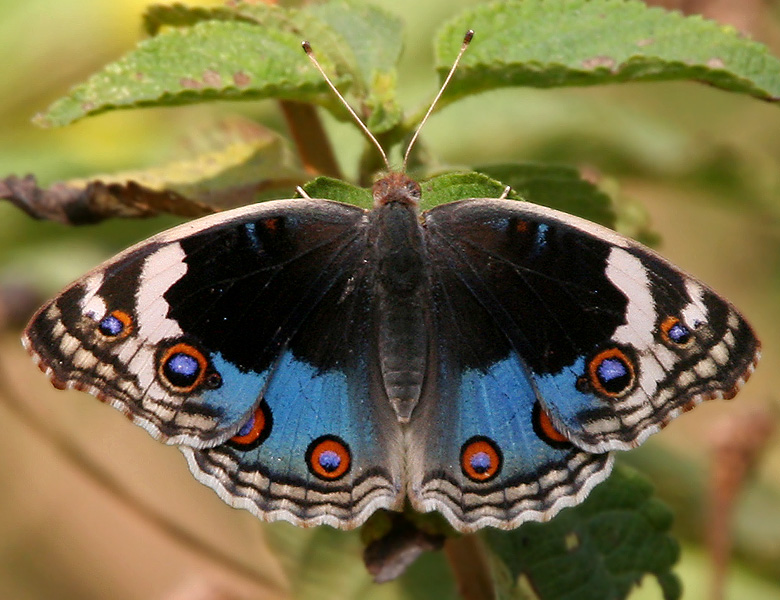
Junonia lemonias was named Papilio lemonias in 1758.

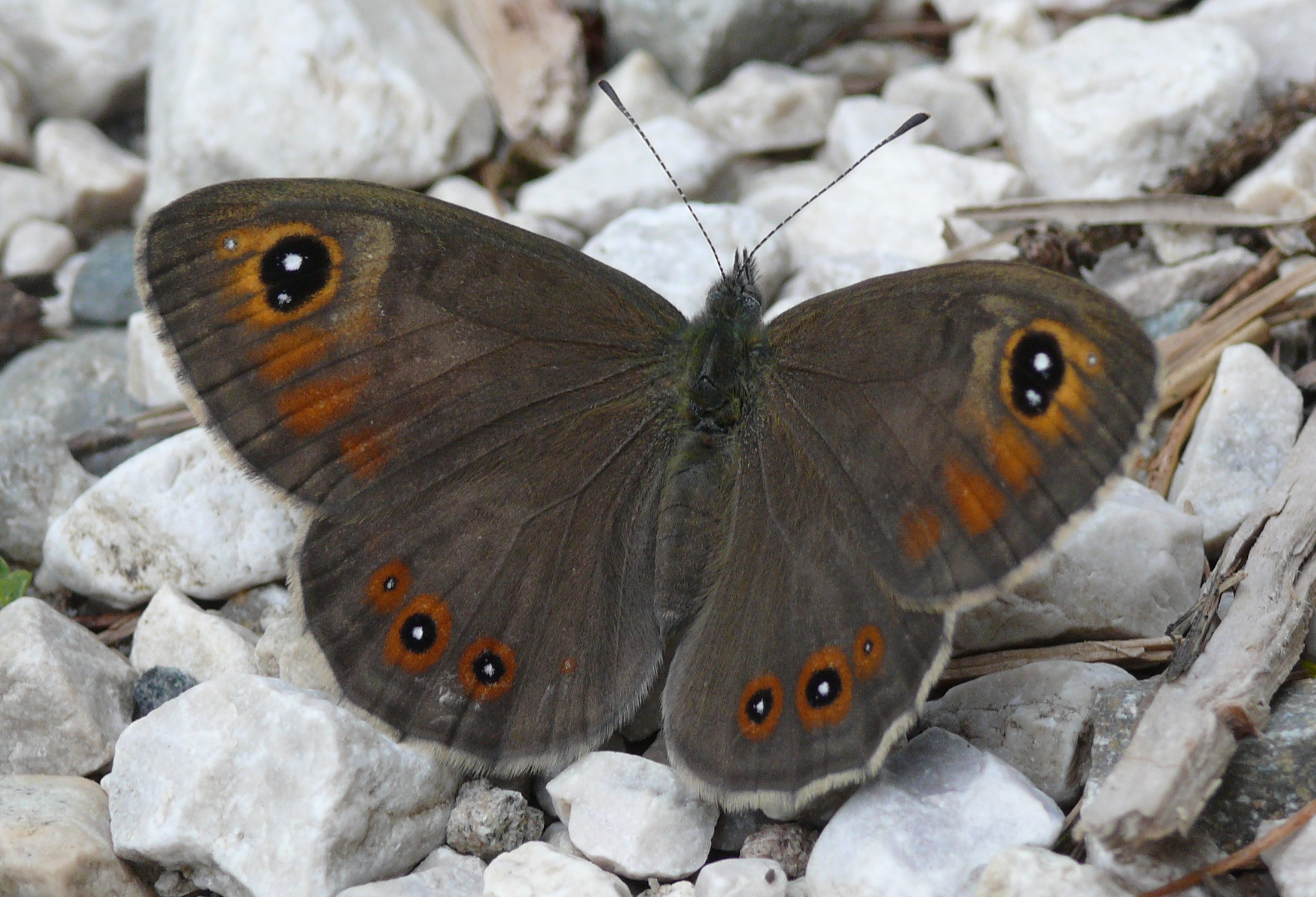
The large wall was named Papilio maera in 1758.

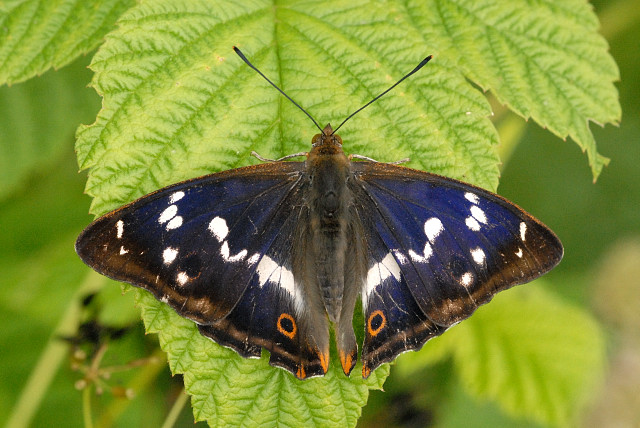
The purple emperor was named Papilio iris, after Iris.

Linnaeus gave two names to the seasonally polyphenic map butterfly.

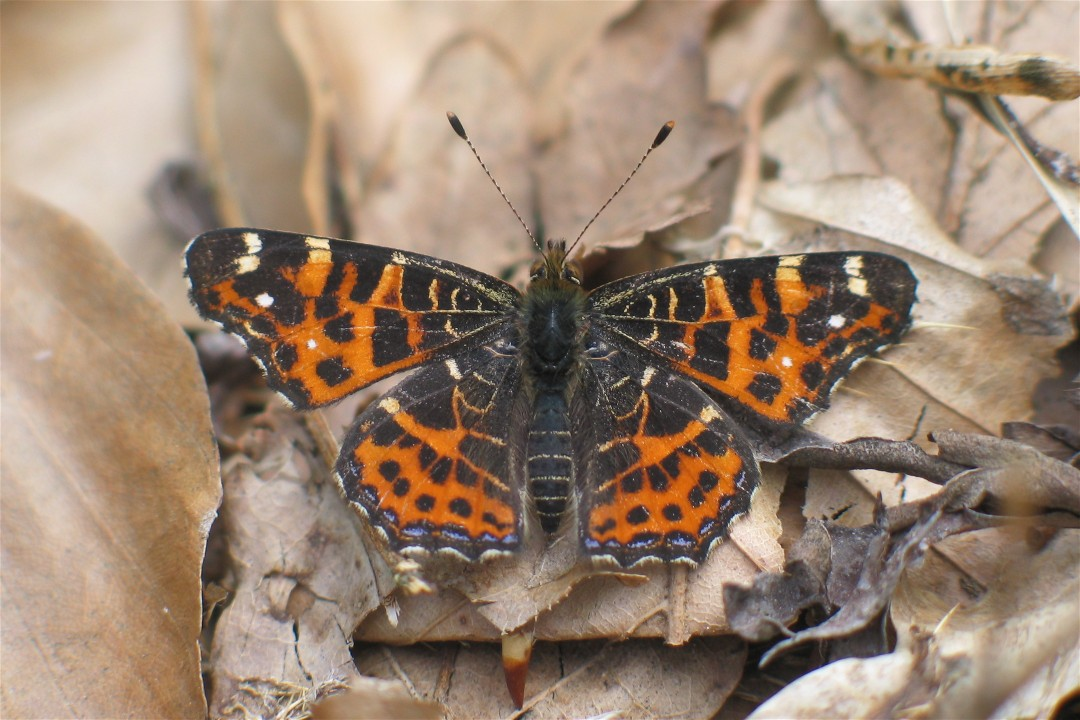
The spring generation was named Papilio levana.

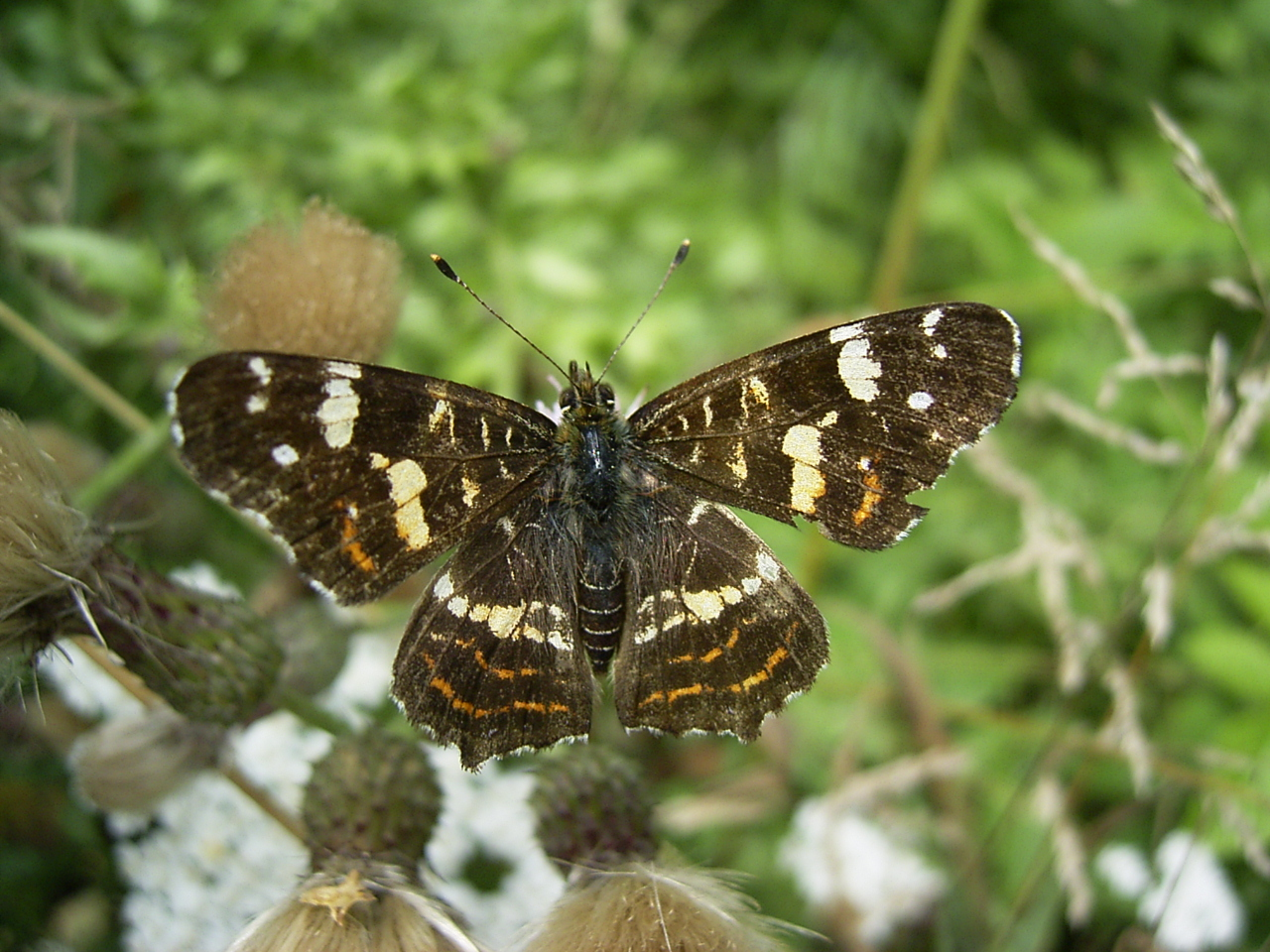
The summer generations were named Papilio prorsa.

- Papilio io – Aglais io
- Papilio almana – Junonia almana
- Papilio asterie – Junonia almana
- Papilio aonis – Junonia lemonias
- Papilio oenone – Junonia oenone
- Papilio lemonias – Junonia lemonias
- Papilio orithya – Junonia orithya
- Papilio feronia – Hamadryas feronia
- Papilio maera – Lasiommata maera, large wall
- Papilio ligea – Erebia ligea
- Papilio aegeria – Pararge aegeria, speckled wood
- Papilio galathea – Melanargia galathea, marbled white
- Papilio cyrene – Salamis anacardii
- Papilio semele – Hipparchia semele, grayling
- Papilio leda – Melanitis leda
- Papilio helie – [nomen dubium]
- Papilio jurtina – Maniola jurtina, meadow brown
- Papilio aeropa – Lexias aeropa
- Papilio janira – Maniola janira
- Papilio cardui – Vanessa cardui, painted lady
- Papilio pipleis – Hypolimnas pandarus
- Papilio lampetia – Cupha lampetia
- Papilio iris – Apatura iris, purple emperor

=== Nymphales phalerati ===
- Papilio populi – Limenitis populi, poplar admiral
- Papilio antiopa – Nymphalis antiopa, Camberwell beauty
- Papilio polychloros – Nymphalis polychloros, large tortoiseshell
- Papilio urticae – Aglais urticae, small tortoiseshell
- Papilio c-album – Polygonia c-album, comma
- Papilio c-aureum – Polygonia c-aureum
- Papilio dirce – Colobura dirce
- Papilio amathea – Anartia amathea
- Papilio atalanta – Vanessa atalanta
- Papilio venilia – Pantoporia venilia
- Papilio alimena – Hypolimnas alimena
- Papilio leucothoe – Athyma perius
- Papilio phaetusa – Dryadula phaetusa
- Papilio bolina – Hypolimnas bolina
- Papilio clytia – Papilio clytia
- Papilio neaerea – Pyrrhogyra neaerea
- Papilio acesta – Tigridia acesta
- Papilio similis – Ideopsis similis
- Papilio assimilis – Hestina assimilis
- Papilio dissimilis – Papilio clytia
- Papilio panope – Papilio clytia
- Papilio rumina – Zerynthia rumina
- Papilio levana – Araschnia levana, map (spring generation)
- Papilio prorsa – Araschnia levana, map (summer generations)
- Papilio lucina – Hamearis lucina
- Papilio maturna – Euphydryas maturna, scarce fritillary
- Papilio cinxia – Melitaea cinxia, Glanville fritillary
- Papilio paphia – Argynnis paphia
- Papilio cytherea – Adelpha cytherea
- Papilio aglaja – Speyeria aglaja, dark green fritillary
- Papilio lathonia – Issoria lathonia
- Papilio euphrosyne – Boloria euphrosyne
- Papilio niobe – Fabriciana niobe
- Papilio vanillae – Agraulis vanillae

=== Plebeji rurales ===
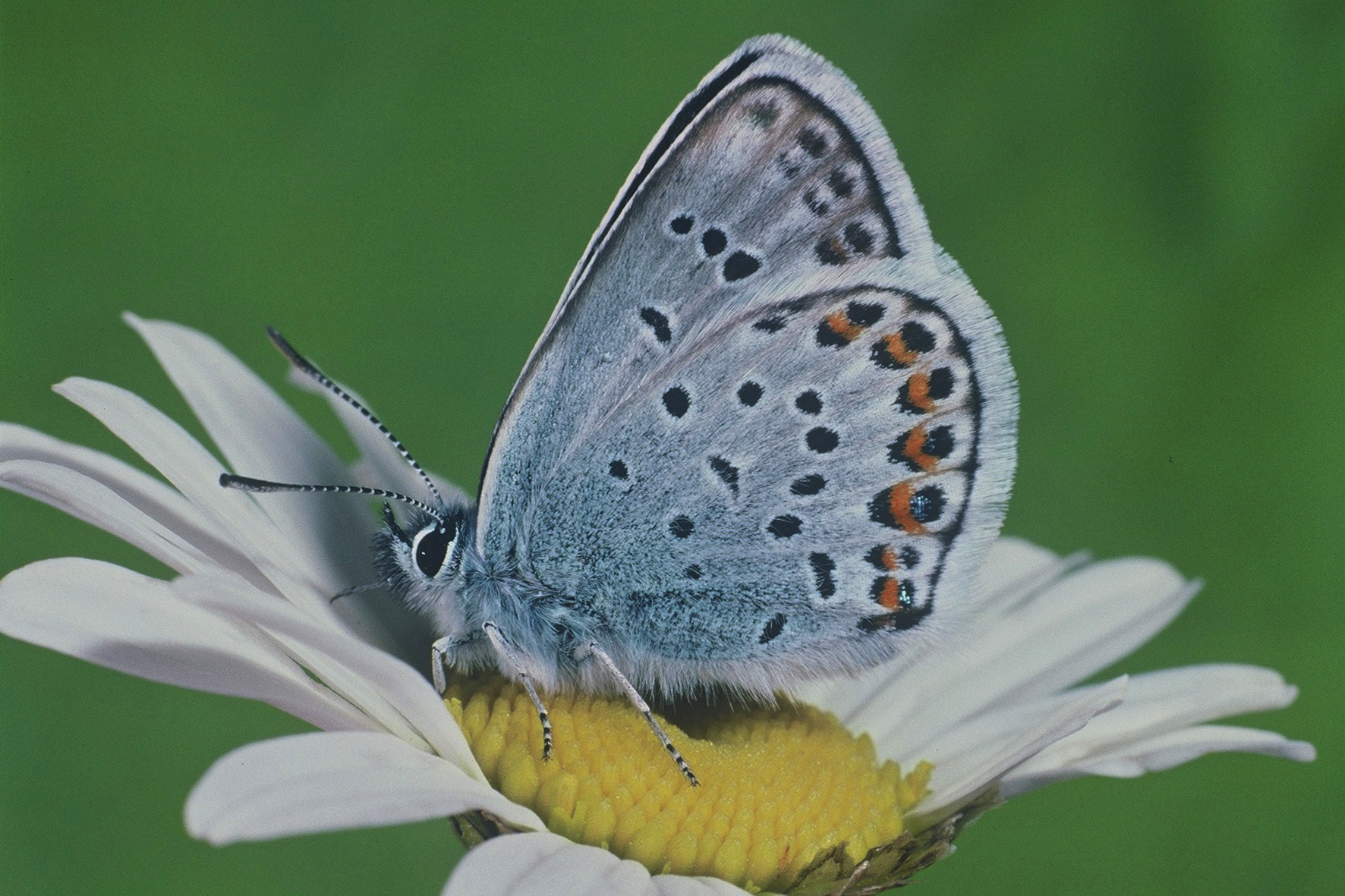
The silver-studded blue was named Papilio argus in 1758.

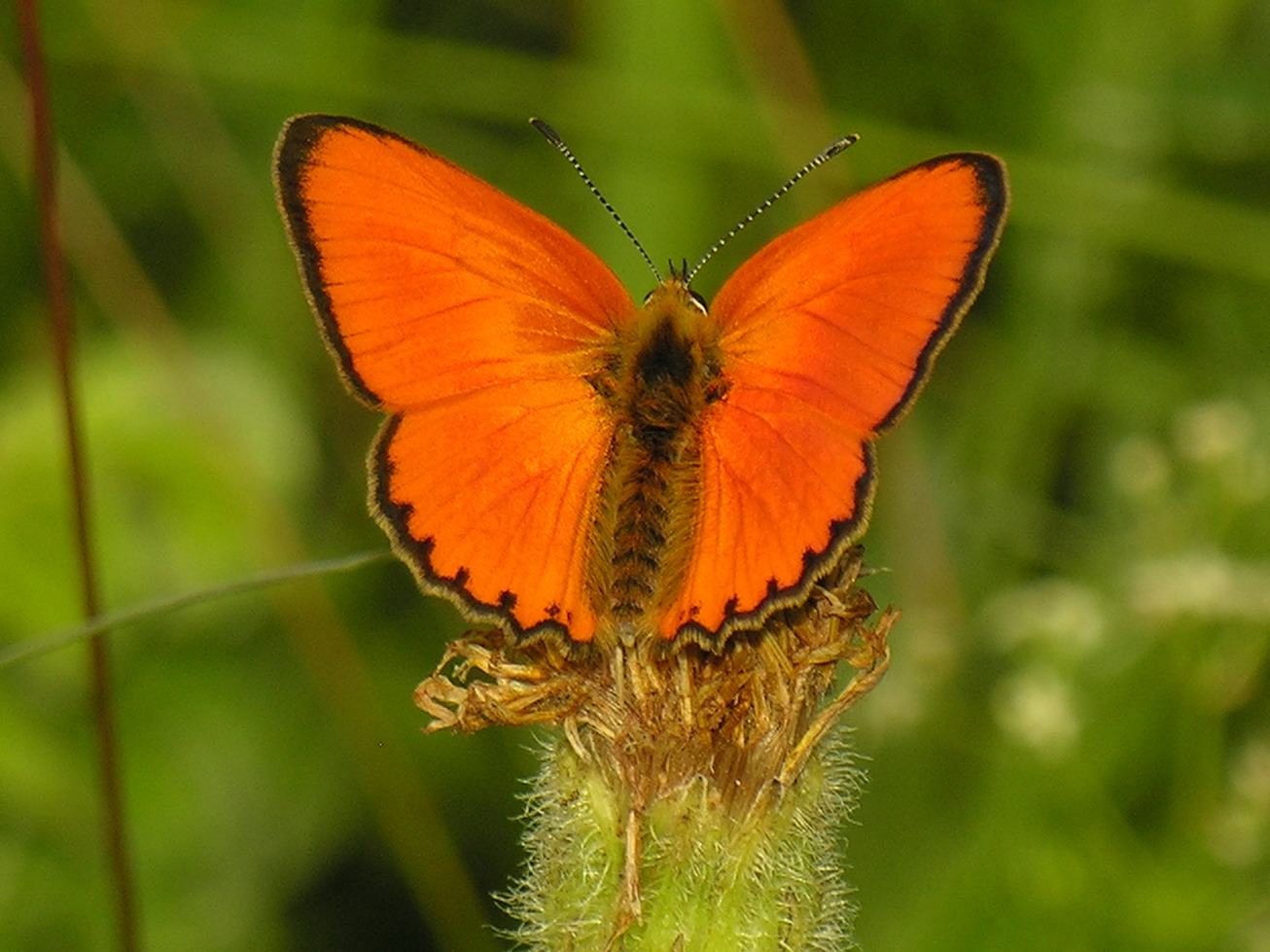
The scarce copper was named Papilio virgaureae in 1758.

- Papilio cupido – Helicopis cupido
- Papilio betulae – Thecla betulae, brown hairstreak
- Papilio pruni – Satyrium pruni, black hairstreak
- Papilio quercus – Quercusia quercus, purple hairstreak
- Papilio marsyas – Pseudolycaena marsyas
- Papilio thamyras – Arhopala thamyras
- Papilio arion – Maculinea arion, large blue
- Papilio argus – Plebejus argus, silver-studded blue
- Papilio argiolus – Celastrina argiolus, holly blue
- Papilio rubi – Callophrys rubi, green hairstreak
- Papilio philocles – Mesosemia philocles
- Papilio timantes – [nomen dubium]
- Papilio athemon – Dynamine athemon
- Papilio caricae – Nymphidium caricae
- Papilio phereclus – Panara phereclus
- Papilio lysippus – Riodina lysippus
- Papilio virgaureae – Lycaena virgaureae, scarce copper

=== Plebeji urbicolae ===
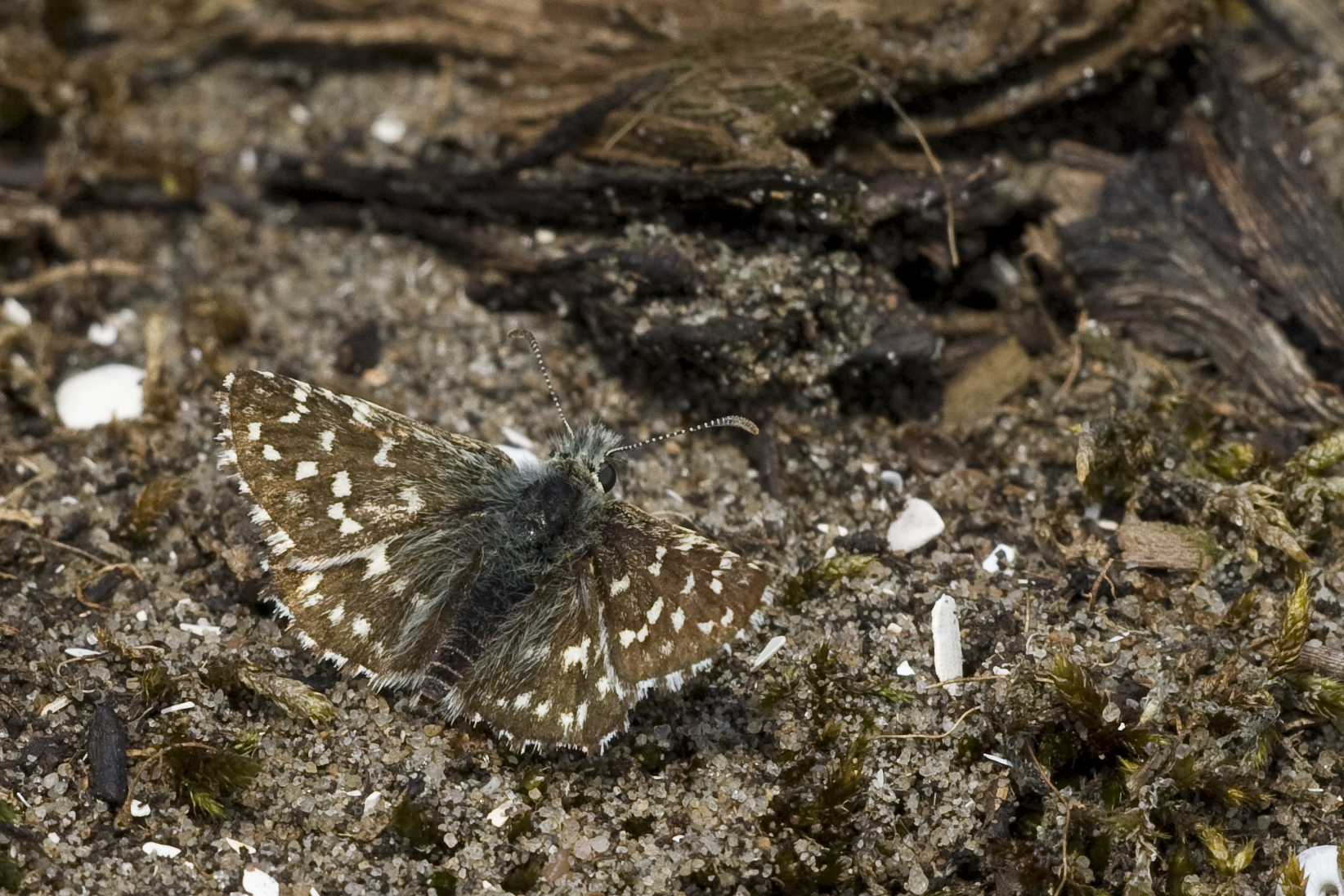
The grizzled skipper was named Papilio malvae in 1758.

- Papilio comma – Hesperia comma
- Papilio proteus – Urbanus proteus, long-tailed skipper
- Papilio phidias – Pyrrhopyge phidias
- Papilio bixae – Pyrrhopyge phidias
- Papilio polycletus – Hypochrysops polycletus
- Papilio malvae – Pyrgus malvae, grizzled skipper
- Papilio tages – Erynnis tages, dingy skipper

=== Barbari ===
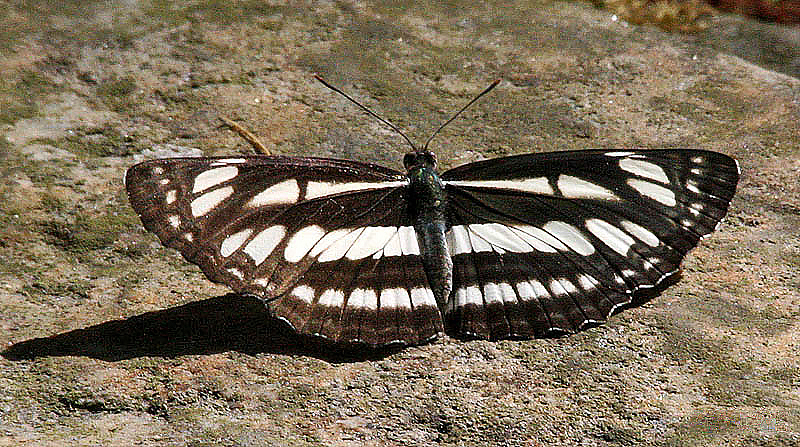
Neptis hylas was named Papilio hylas, after Hylas.

- Papilio bates – Colobura dirce
- Papilio tiphus – Pyrrhogyra neaerea
- Papilio jason – [nomen dubium]
- Papilio iphiclus – Adelpha iphiclus
- Papilio hylas – Neptis hylas
- Papilio idmon – [nomen dubium]
- Papilio ancaeus – Nessaea obrinus
- Papilio eleus – Adelpha cytherea
- Papilio amphion – Phaedyma amphion
- Papilio telamon – Cyrestis telamon
- Papilio eribotes – [nomen dubium]
- Papilio eurytus – Pseudacraea eurytus
- Papilio ceneus – Delias ceneus
- Papilio mopsus – Mechanitis polymnia
- Papilio cepheus – Acraea cepheus
- Papilio zetes – Acraea zetes
- Papilio priassus – Entheus priassus
- Papilio acastus – [nomen dubium]
- Papilio neleus – Hyalothyrus neleus
- Papilio encedon – Acraea encedon
- Papilio pinthous – Moschoneura pinthous
- Papilio nauplius – Eresia nauplius
- Papilio ixilion – [nomen dubium]
- Papilio idas – [suppressed]

== Sphinx (hawk moths) ==
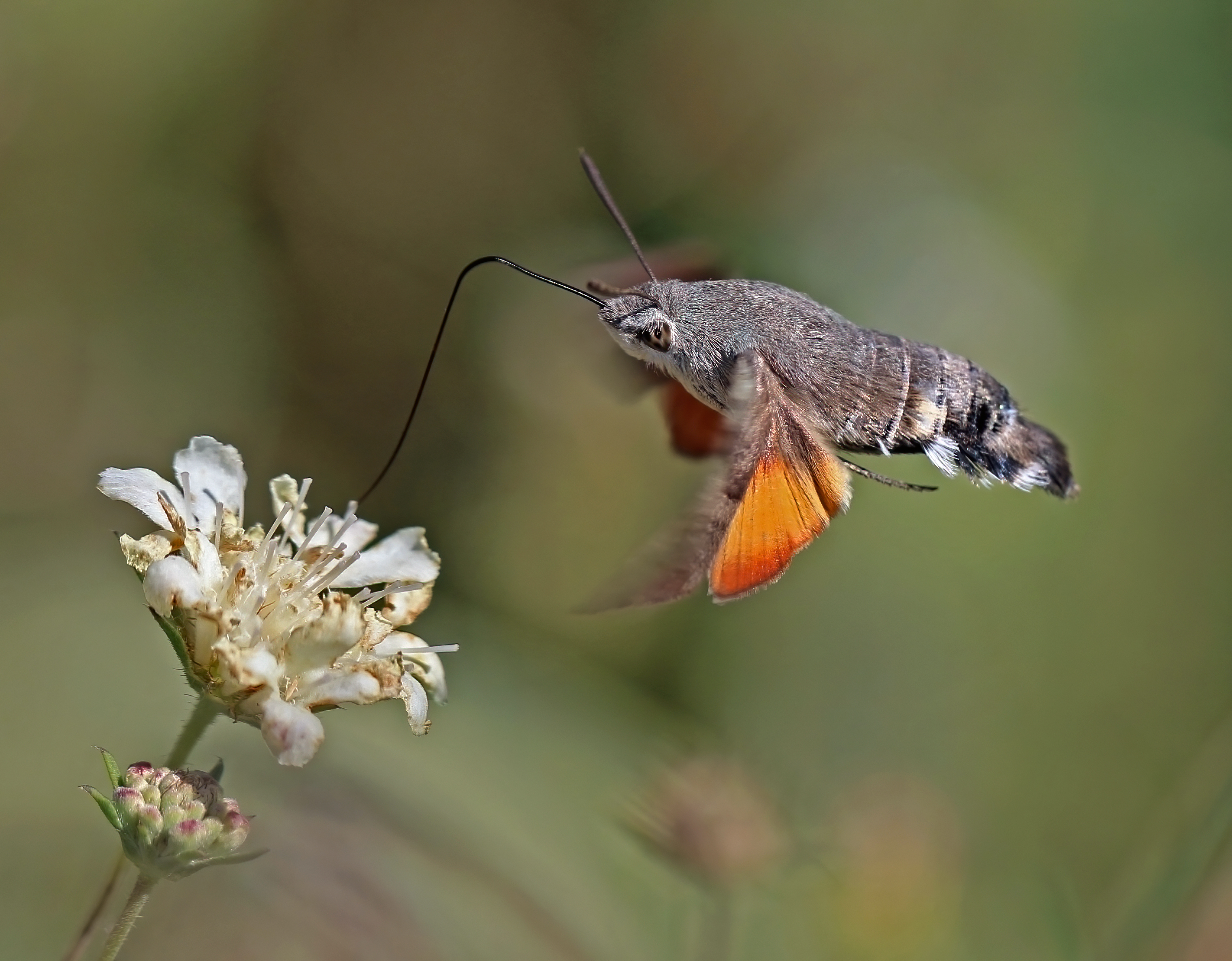
Macroglossum stellatarum, the hummingbird hawk moth, was named Sphinx stellatarum in 1758.

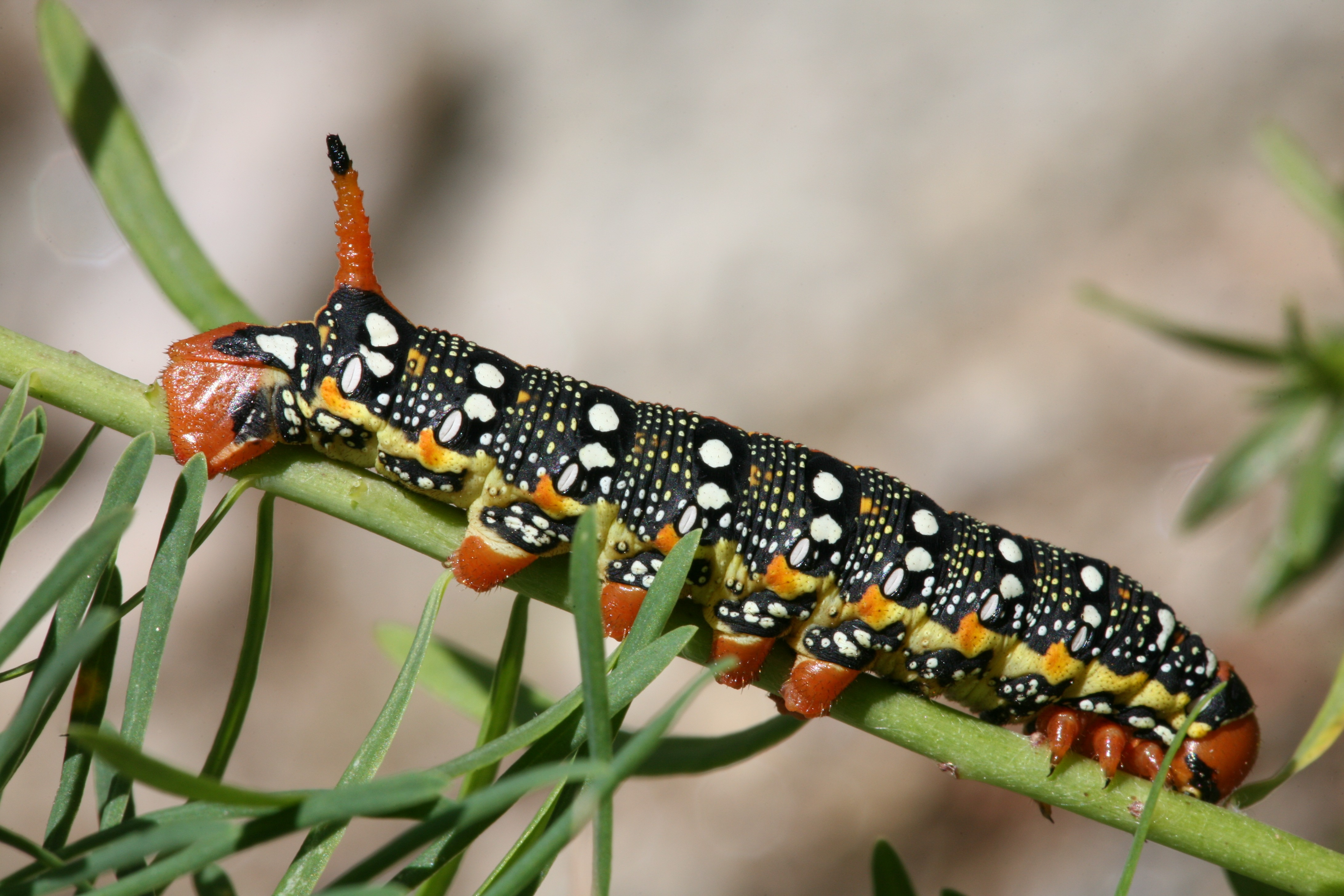
Hyles euphorbiae, the spurge hawk moth (caterpillar pictured), was named Sphinx euphorbiae in 1758.

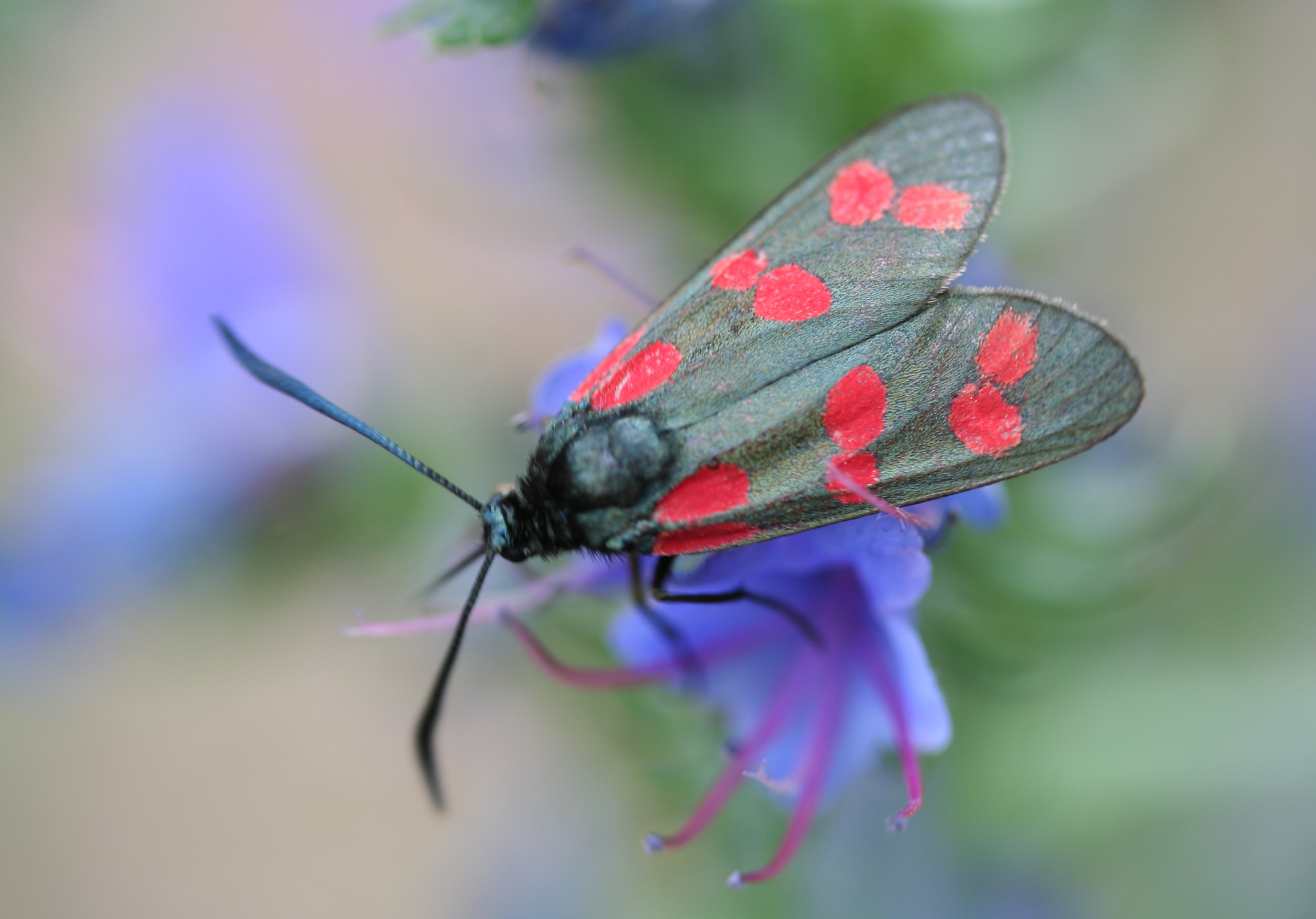
Zygaena filipendulae, the six-spot burnet moth (Zygaenidae) was included among the hawk moths of the genus Sphinx in 1758.

- Sphinx ocellata – Smerinthus ocellata
- Sphinx populi – Laothoe populi
- Sphinx tiliae – Mimas tiliae
- Sphinx ocypete – Enyo ocypete
- Sphinx nerii – Daphnis nerii
- Sphinx convolvuli – Agrius convolvuli
- Sphinx ligustri – Sphinx ligustri
- Sphinx atropos – Acherontia atropos
- Sphinx caricae – Tatoglossum caricae
- Sphinx celerio – Hippotion celerio
- Sphinx ello – Erinnyis ello
- Sphinx labruscae – Argeus labruscae
- Sphinx ficus – Pachylia ficus
- Sphinx vitis – Eumorpha vitis
- Sphinx elpenor – Deilephila elpenor
- Sphinx porcellus – Deilephila porcellus
- Sphinx euphorbiae – Hyles euphorbiae
- Sphinx alecto – Theretra alecto
- Sphinx megaera – Argeus megaera
- Sphinx pinastri – Sphinx pinastri
- Sphinx tisiphone – Hippotion celerio
- Sphinx thyelia – Xylophanes thyelia
- Sphinx tantalus – Aellopos tantalus
- Sphinx tityus – Hemaris tityus
- Sphinx ixion – Aellopos tantalus
- Sphinx stellatarum – Macroglossum stellatarum
- Sphinx bombyliformis – Hemaris tityus
- Sphinx fuciformis – Hemaris fuciformis
- Sphinx culiciformis – Synanthedon culiciformis
- Sphinx salmachus – Synanthedon tipuliformis
- Sphinx belis – Macroglossum belis
- Sphinx filipendulae – Zygaena filipendulae, six-spot burnet moth
- Sphinx phegea – Syntomis phegea, nine-spotted moth
- Sphinx creusa – Euchromia creusa
- Sphinx polymena – Euchromia polymena
- Sphinx cassandra – Saurita cassandra
- Sphinx pectinicornis – Chalcosia pectinicornis
- Sphinx statices – Adscita statices

== Phalaena (moths) ==
=== Bombyces ===
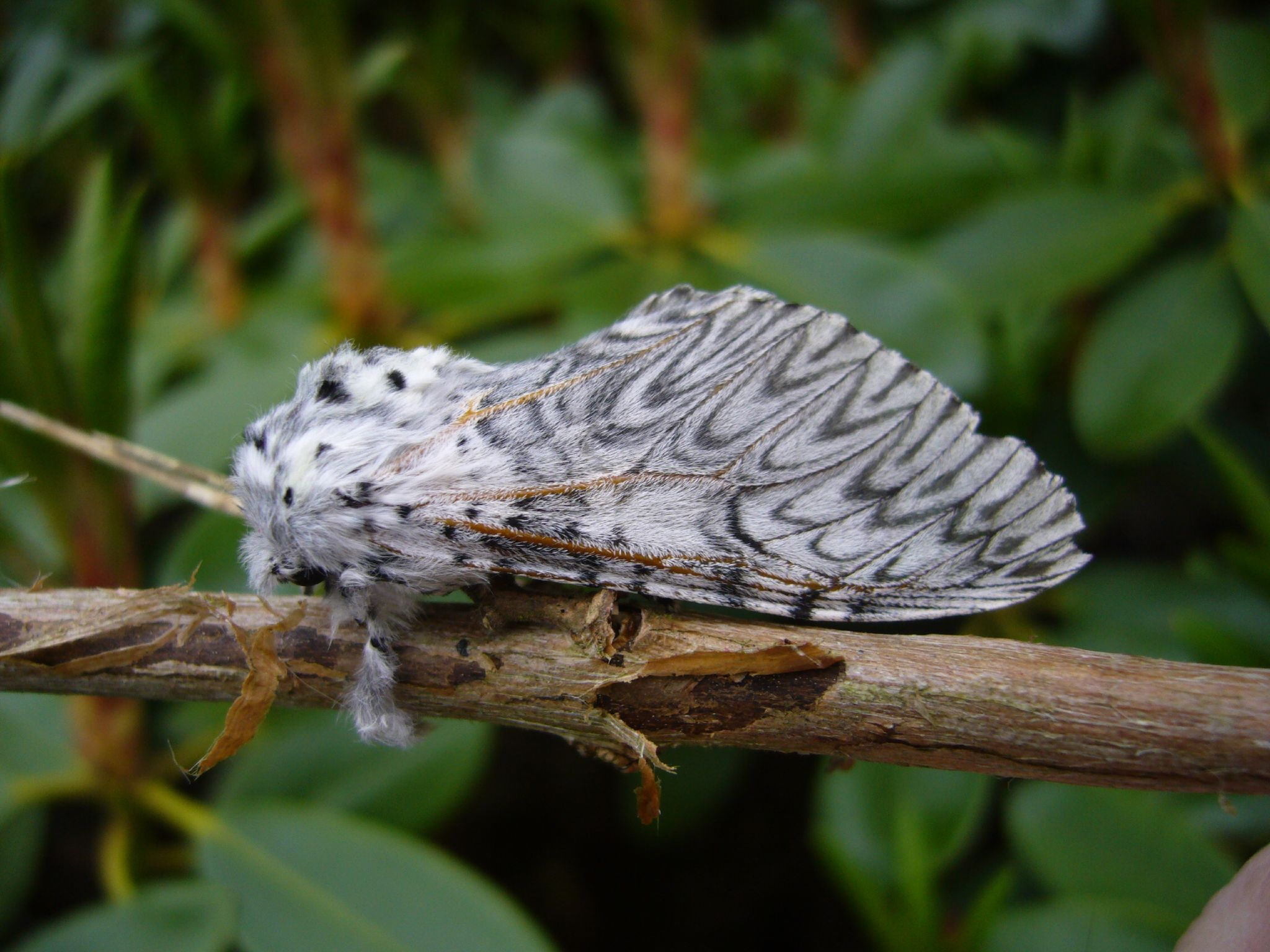
The puss moth Cerura vinula was described as Phalaena vinula in 1758.

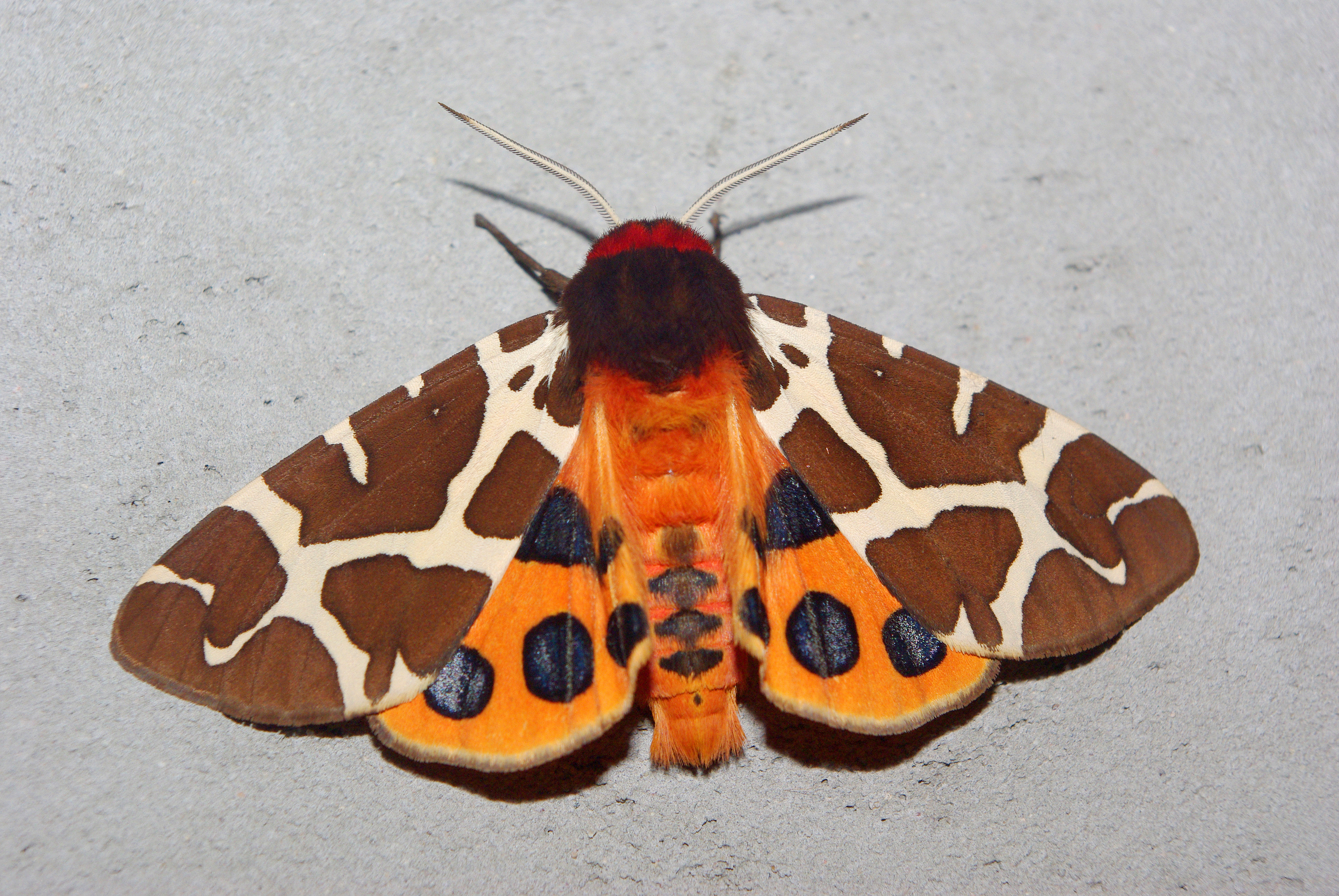
Arctia caja was described as Phalaena caja in 1758.

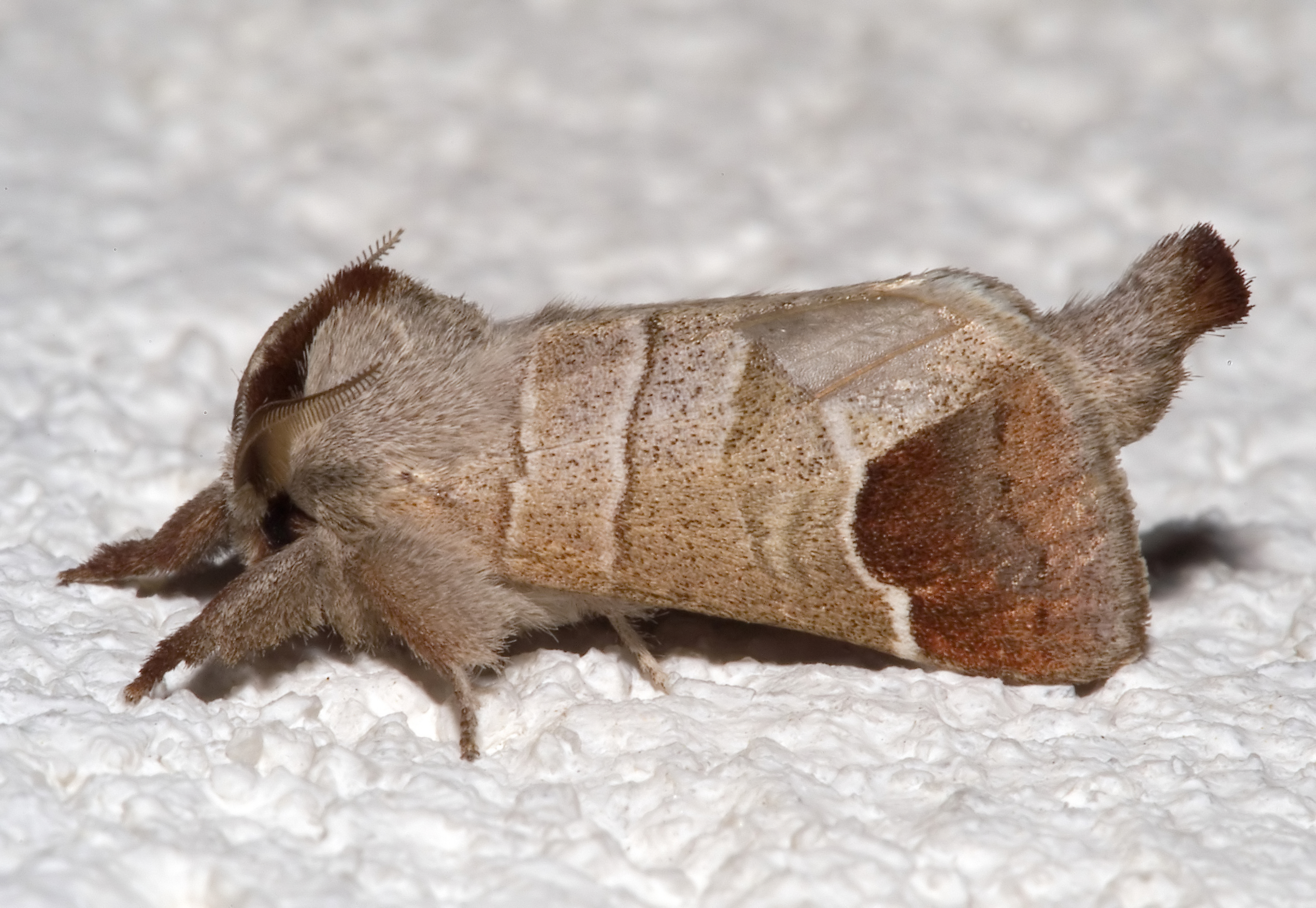
Clostera curtula was described as Phalaena curtula in 1758.

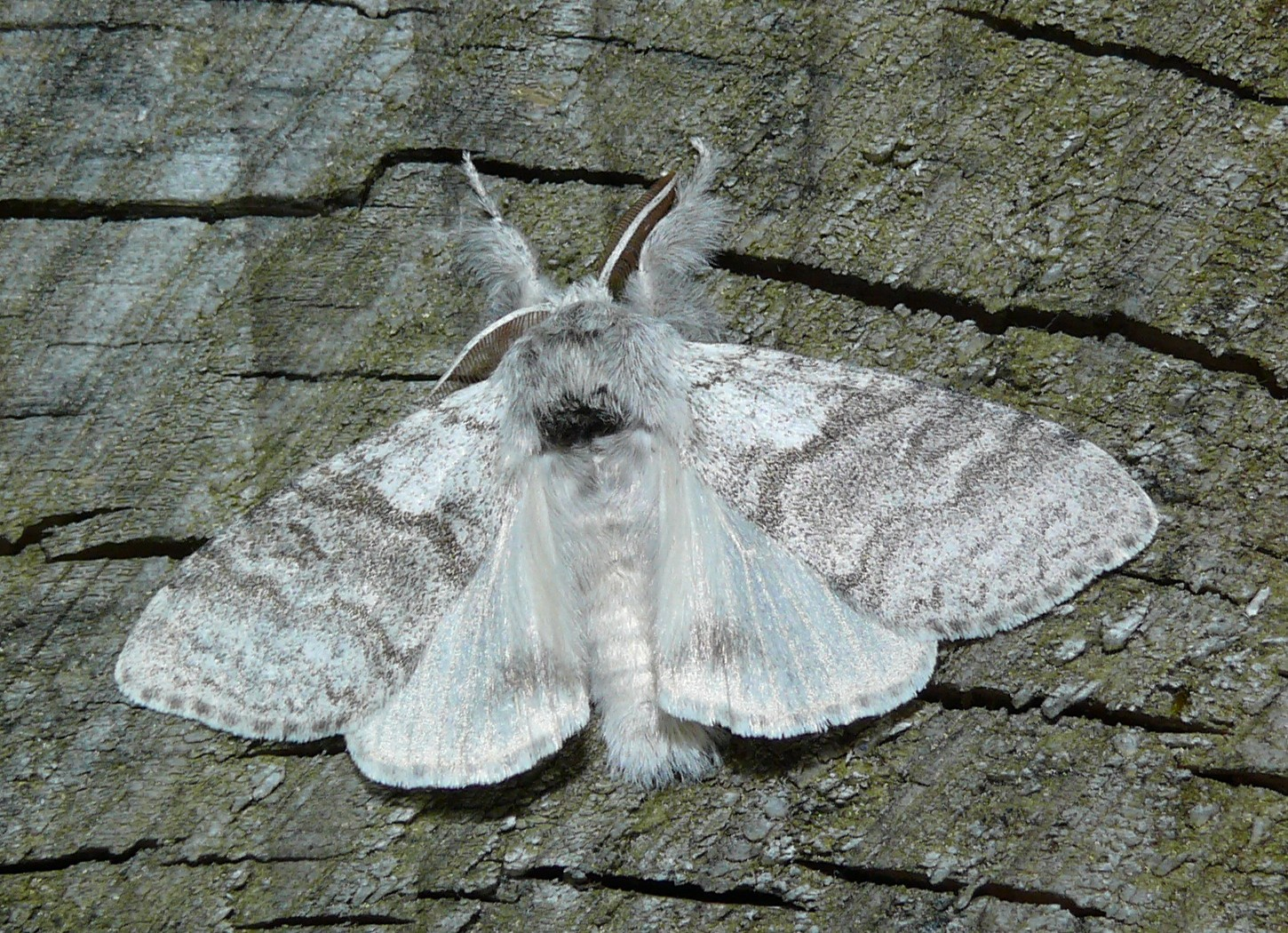
Calliteara pudibunda was described as Phalaena pudibunda in 1758.

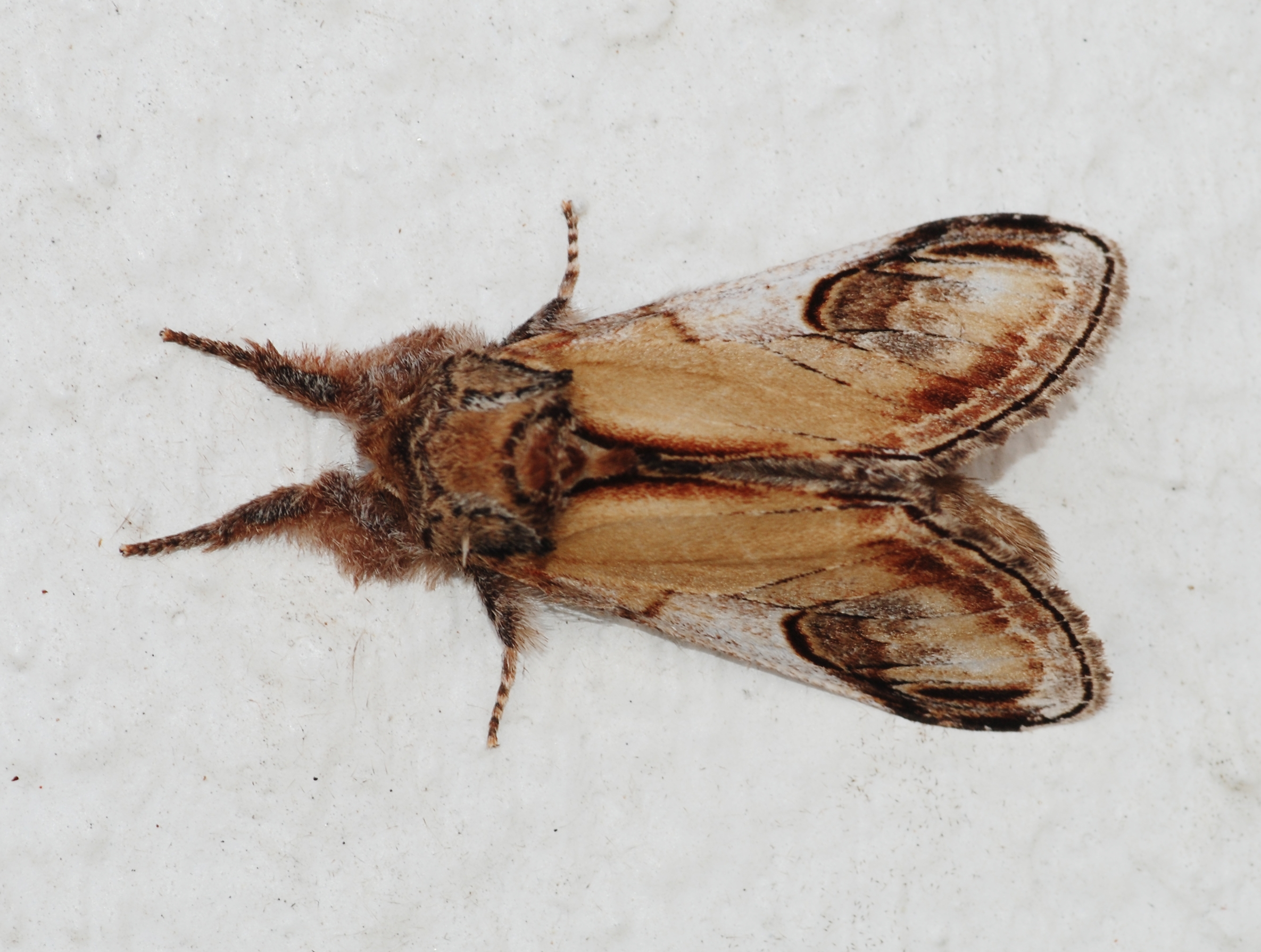
Notodonta ziczac was described as Phalaena ziczac in 1758.

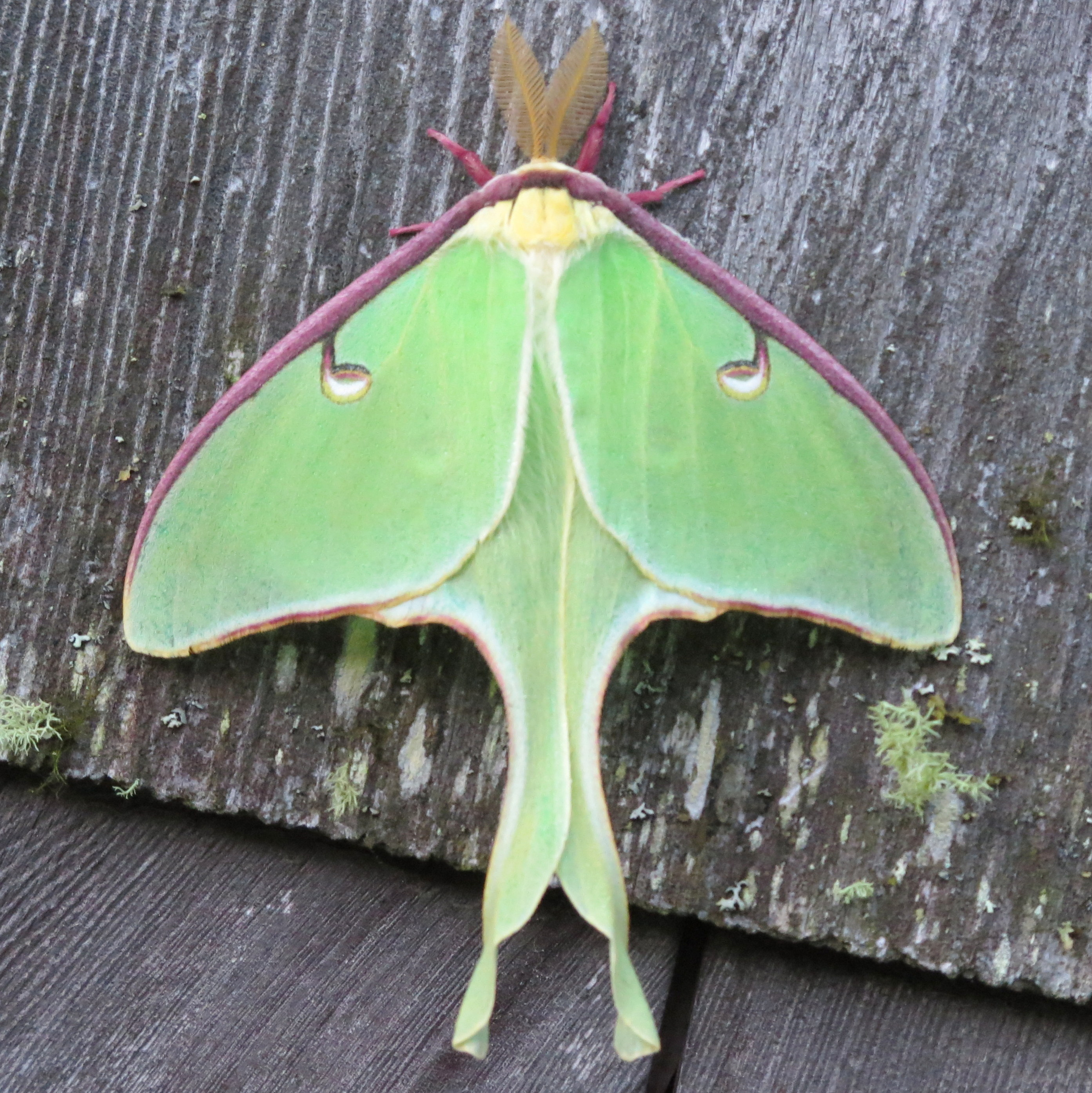
The Luna moth Actias luna was described in 1758.

(Note: Except where otherwise indicated, all given identities of Linnaeus' Bombyces are taken from Mikkola & Honey (1993).)

- Phalaena atlas – Attacus atlas
- Phalaena hesperus – Rothschildia hesperus
- Phalaena cecropia – Hyalophora cecropia
- Phalaena paphia – Antheraea paphia
- Phalaena luna – Actias luna
- Phalaena pavonia – Saturnia pavonia
- Phalaena tau – Aglia tau
- Phalaena quercifolia
- Phalaena ilicifolia – Phyllodesma ilicifolia
- Phalaena pruni – Odonestis pruni
- Phalaena potatoria – Euthrix potatoria
- Phalaena pini – Dendrolimus pini
- Phalaena quercus – Lasiocampa quercus
- Phalaena rubi – Macrothylacia rubi
- Phalaena lanestris – Eriogaster lanestris
- Phalaena vinula – Cerura vinula
- Phalaena versicolora – Endromis versicolora
- Phalaena mori – Bombyx mori
- Phalaena neustria – Malacosoma neustria
- Phalaena castrensis – Malacosoma castrense
- Phalaena catax – Eriogaster catax
- Phalaena processionea – Thaumatopoea processionea
- Phalaena caja – Arctia caja
- Phalaena virgo – Apantesis virgo
- Phalaena villica – Arctia villica
- Phalaena plantaginis – Parasemia plantaginis
- Phalaena monacha – Lymantria monacha
- Phalaena dispar – Lymantria dispar, gypsy moth
- Phalaena chrysorrhoea – Euproctis chrysorrhoea
- Phalaena salicis – Leucoma salicis
- Phalaena crataegi – Trichiura crataegi
- Phalaena striata – Spiris striata
- Phalaena populi – Poecilocampa populi
- Phalaena coryli – Colocasia coryli
- Phalaena curtula – Clostera curtula
- Phalaena pudibunda – Calliteara pudibunda
- Phalaena fascelina – Dicallomera fascelina
- Phalaena antiqua – Orgyia antiqua
- Phalaena caeruleocephala – Diloba caeruleocephala
- Phalaena ziczac – Notodonta ziczac
- Phalaena cossus – Cossus cossus
- Phalaena fenestra – Hyalurga fenestra
- Phalaena perspicua – Pitthea perspicua
- Phalaena odorata – Ascalapha odorata
- Phalaena militaris – Dysphaena militaris
- Phalaena purpurata – Rhyparia purpurata
- Phalaena aulica – Hyphoraia aulica
- Phalaena lubricipeda – Spilosoma lubricipedum
- Phalaena sannio – Diacrisia sannio
- Phalaena anastomosis – Clostera anastomosis
- Phalaena graminis – Cerapteryx graminis
- Phalaena lusoria – Lygephila lusoria
- Phalaena grammica – Spiris grammica
- Phalaena cribraria – Coscinia cribraria
- Phalaena celsia – Staurophora celsia
- Phalaena libatrix – Scoliopteryx libatrix
- Phalaena capucina – Ptilodon capucinus
- Phalaena camelina – Ptilodon camelinus
- Phalaena oo – Dicycla oo
- Phalaena rufina – Agrochola rufina
- Phalaena helvola – Agrochola helvola

=== Noctuae ===
(Note: Except where otherwise indicated, the identities of Linnaeus' Noctuae are taken from Mikkola & Honey (1993).)

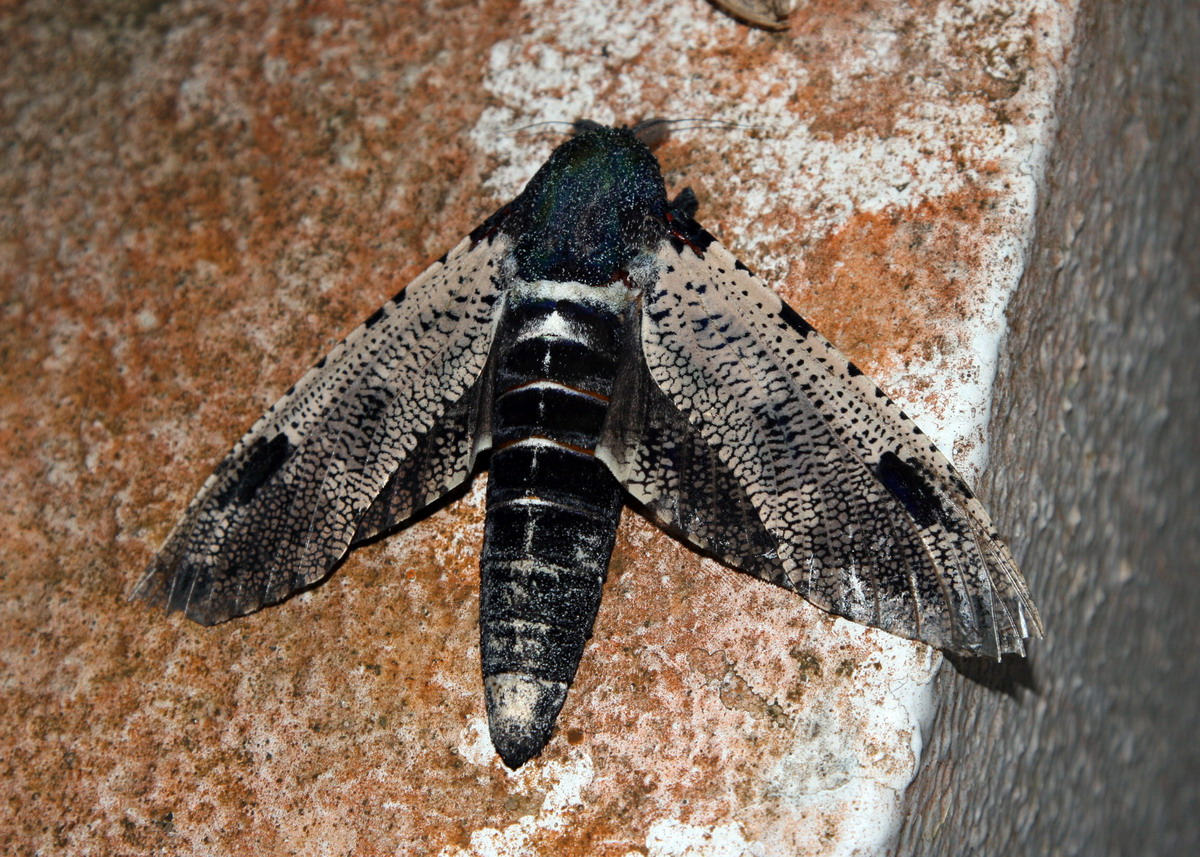
Xyleutes strix was described as Phalaena strix in 1758.

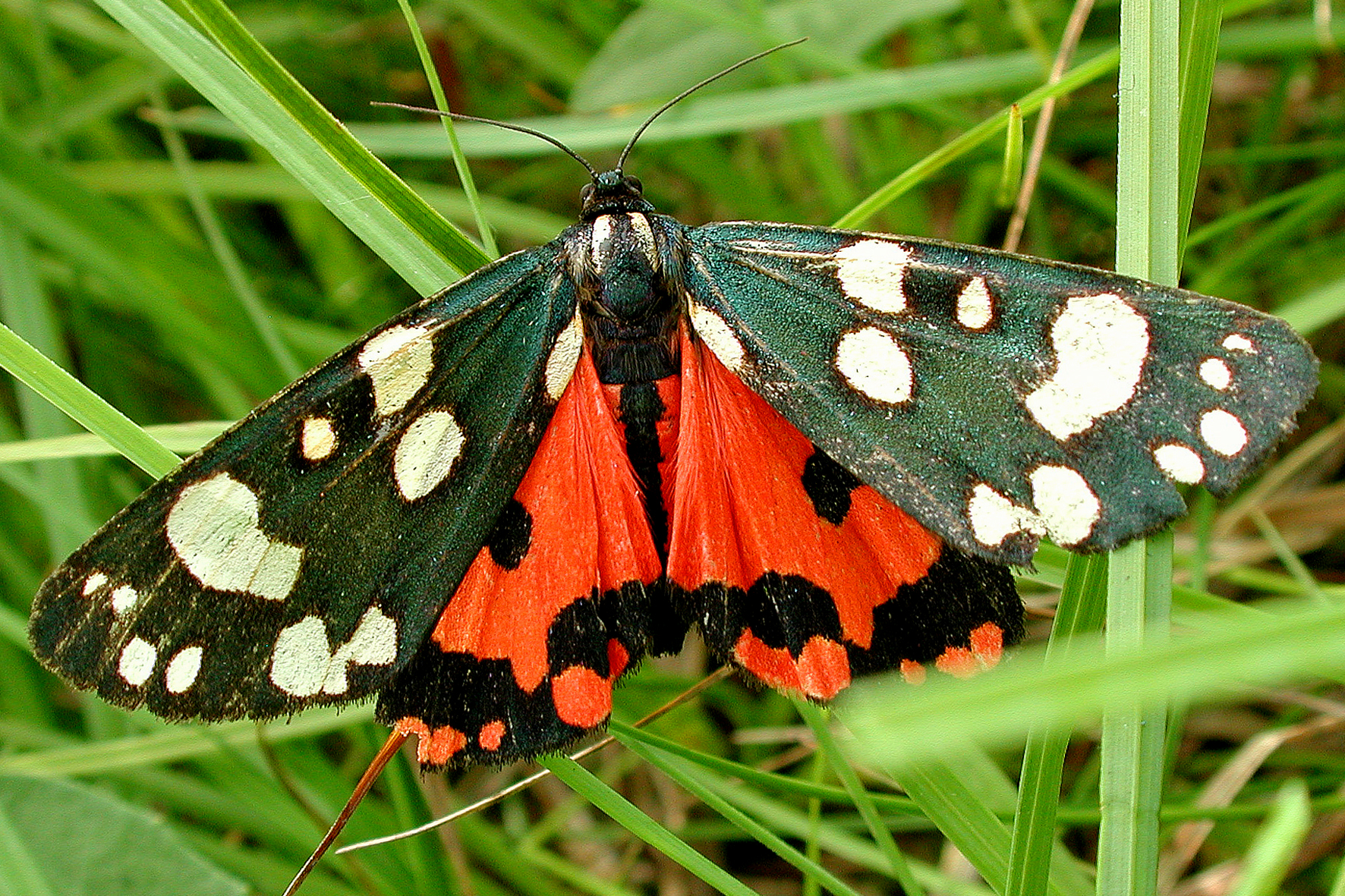
Callimorpha dominula was described as Phalaena dominula in 1758.

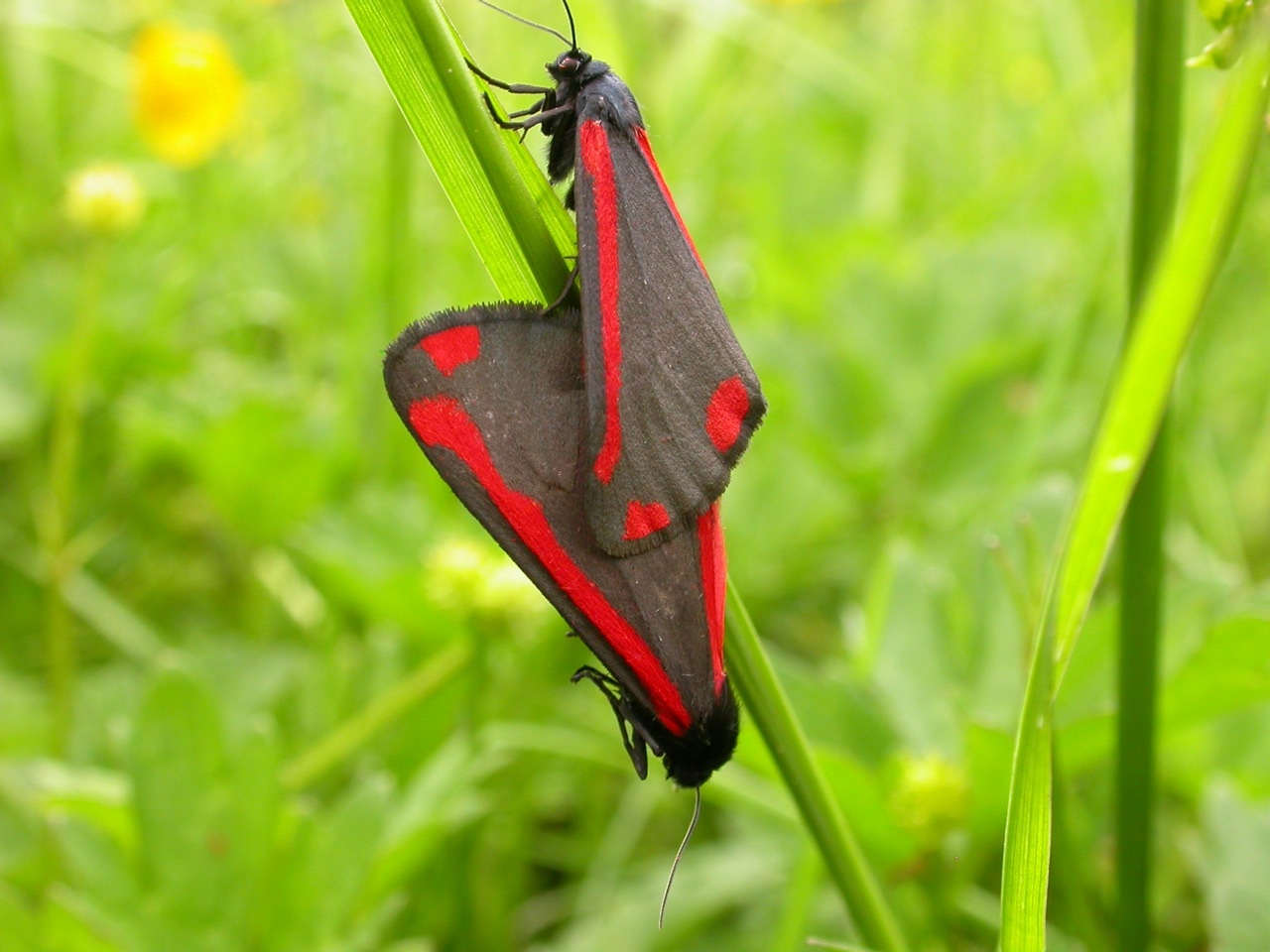
Tyria jacobaeae was described as Phalaena jacobaeae in 1758.

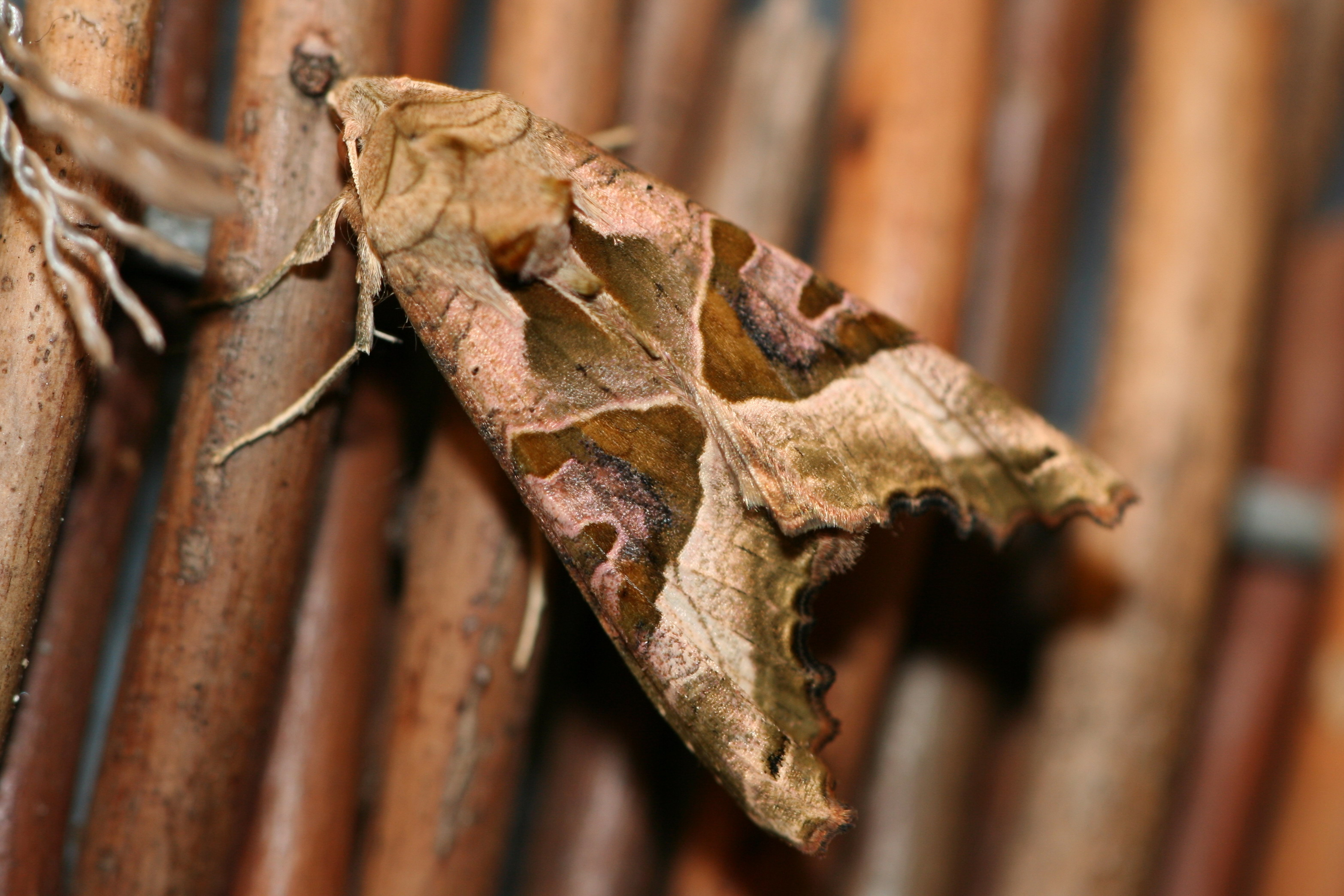
The angle shades moth, Phlogophora meticulosa, was described as Phalaena meticulosa in 1758.

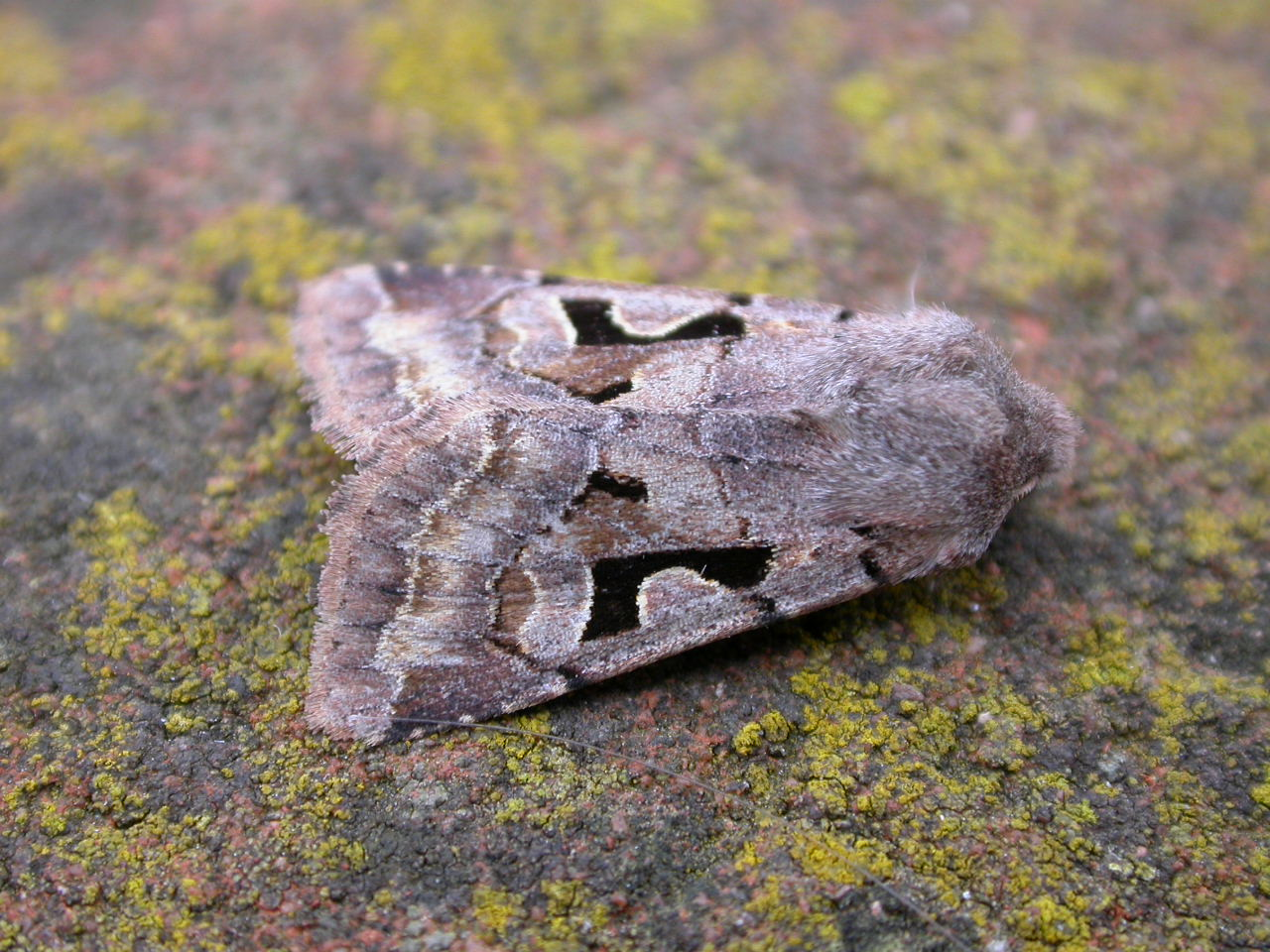
Orthosia gothica was described as Phalaena gothica in 1758.

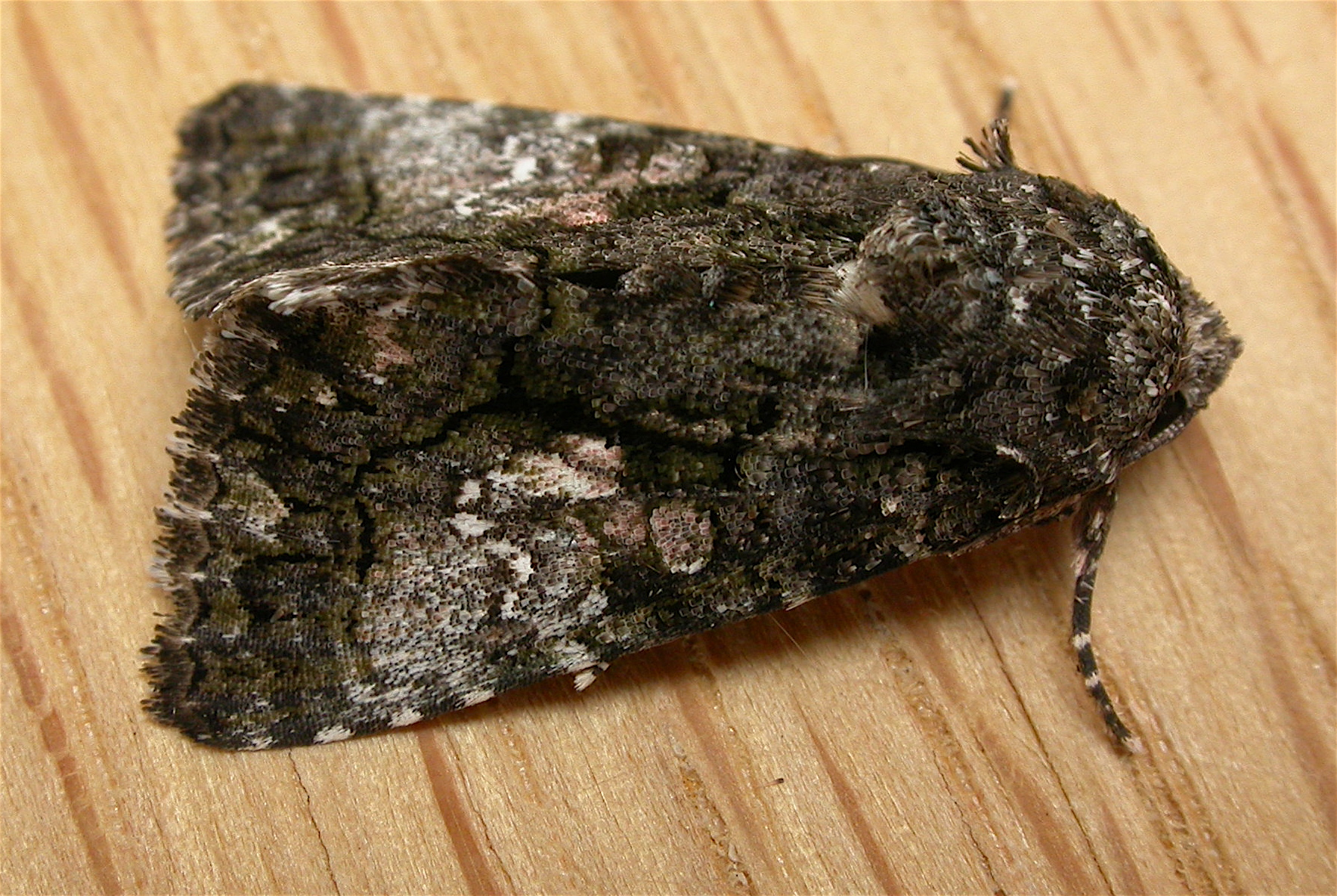
Aedia leucomelas was described as Phalaena leucomelas in 1758.

- Phalaena strix – Xyleutes strix
- Phalaena fagi – Stauropus fagi
- Phalaena bucephala – Phalera bucephala
- Phalaena hecta – Phymatopus hecta
- Phalaena humuli – Hepialus humuli
- Phalaena lupulina – Hepialus lupulinus
- Phalaena lunus – Nothus lunus
- Phalaena crepuscularis – Erebus crepuscularis
- Phalaena occidua – Erebus occiduus
- Phalaena punctigera – Cacyparis punctigera
- Phalaena dominula – Callimorpha dominula
- Phalaena matronula – Pericallia matronula
- Phalaena fuliginosa – Phragmatobia fuliginosa
- Phalaena fulvia – Chionaema fulvium
- Phalaena batis – Thyatira batis
- Phalaena trapezina – Cosmia trapezina
- Phalaena lucernea – Standfussiana lucernea
- Phalaena pellex – Utetheisa pellex
- Phalaena glyphica – Euclidia glyphica
- Phalaena pallens – Mythimna pallens
- Phalaena russula – Diacrisia russula
- Phalaena leporina – Acronicta leporina
- Phalaena ornatrix – Utetheisa ornatrix
- Phalaena jacobaeae – Tyria jacobaeae
- Phalaena heliconia – Asota heliconia
- Phalaena rubricollis – Atolmis rubricollis
- Phalaena quadra – Lithosia quadra
- Phalaena complana – Eilema complanum
- Phalaena pacta – Catocala pacta
- Phalaena pronuba – Noctua pronuba
- Phalaena maura – Mormo maura
- Phalaena fraxini – Catocala fraxini
- Phalaena chrysitis – Diachrysia chrysitis
- Phalaena gamma – Autographa gamma
- Phalaena interrogationis – Syngrapha interrogationis
- Phalaena jota – Autographa jota
- Phalaena festucae – Plusia festucae
- Phalaena meticulosa – Phlogophora meticulosa
- Phalaena psi – Acronicta psi
- Phalaena chi – Antitype chi
- Phalaena aceris – Acronicta aceris
- Phalaena aprilina – Dichonia aprilina
- Phalaena ludifica – Trichosea ludifica
- Phalaena occulta – Eurois occultus
- Phalaena conspicillaris – Egira conspicillaris
- Phalaena umbratica – Cucullia umbratica
- Phalaena exsoleta – Xylena exsoleta
- Phalaena verbasci – Cucullia verbasci
- Phalaena exclamationis – Agrotis exclamationis
- Phalaena gothica – Orthosia gothica
- Phalaena scabriuscula – Dipterygia scabriuscula
- Phalaena strigilis – Oligia strigilis
- Phalaena C nigrum – Xestia c-nigrum
- Phalaena brassicae – Mamestra brassicae
- Phalaena rumicis – Acronicta rumicis
- Phalaena oxyacanthae – Allophyes oxyacanthae
- Phalaena oleracea – Lacanobia oleracea
- Phalaena pisi – Melanchra pisi
- Phalaena atriplicis – Trachea atriplicis
- Phalaena praecox – Actebia praecox
- Phalaena triplasia – Abrostola triplasia
- Phalaena pyramidea – Amphipyra pyramidea
- Phalaena flavicornis – Achlya flavicornis
- Phalaena leucomelas – Aedia leucomelas
- Phalaena typica – Naenia typica
- Phalaena lucipara – Euplexia lucipara
- Phalaena delphinii – Periphanes delphinii
- Phalaena citrago – Xanthia citrago
- Phalaena secalis – Mesapamea secalis

=== Geometrae ===
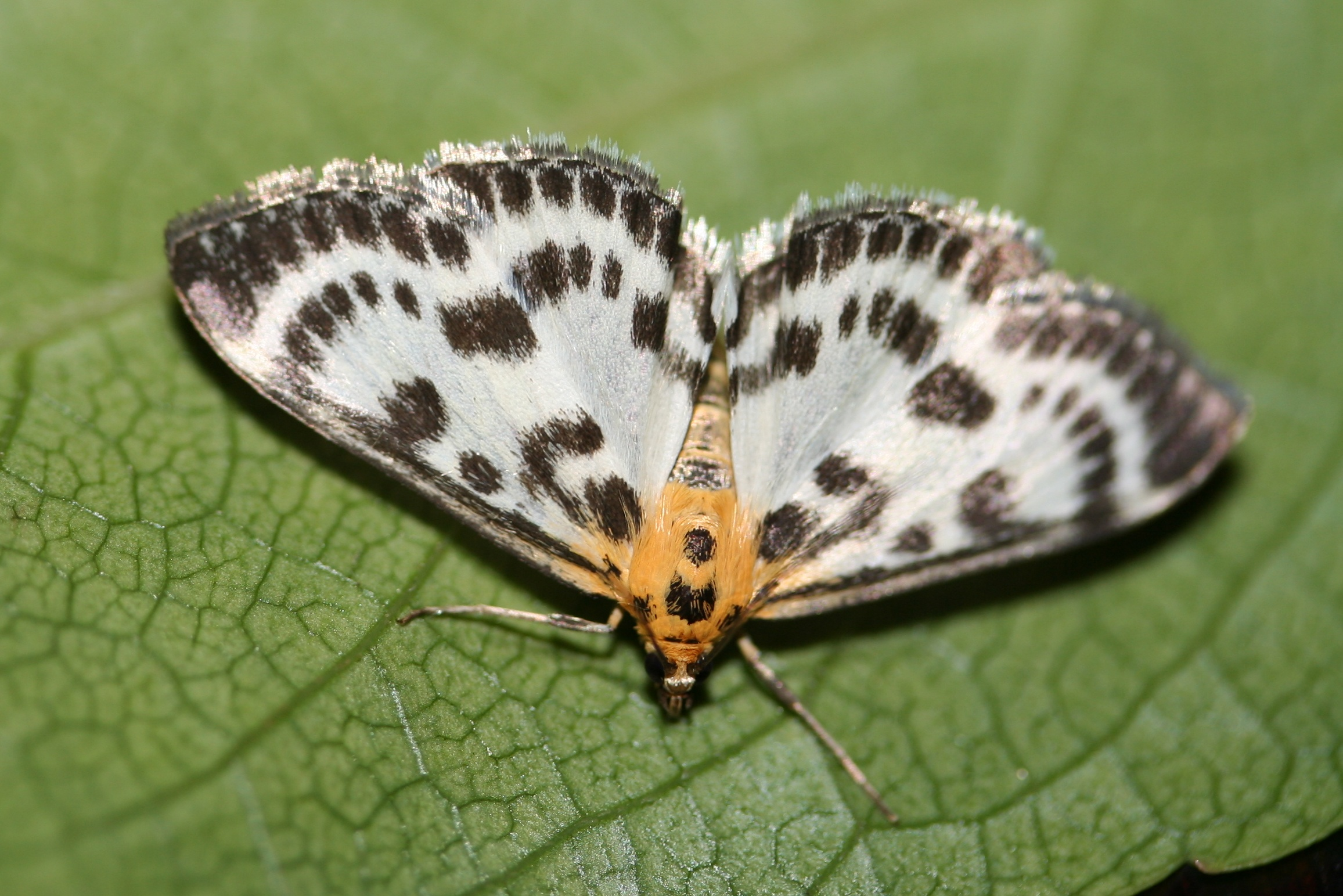
Eurrhypara hortulata was described as Phalaena hortulata in 1758.

- Phalaena lactearia – Jodis lactearia
- Phalaena falcataria – Drepana falcataria
- Phalaena sambucaria – Ourapteryx sambucaria
- Phalaena lacertinaria – Falcaria lacertinaria
- Phalaena alniaria – Ennomos alniaria
- Phalaena syringaria – Apeira syringaria
- Phalaena prunaria – Angerona prunaria
- Phalaena piniaria – Bupalus piniaria
- Phalaena tiliaria
- Phalaena vulpinaria – synonym of Diacrisia sannio
- Phalaena elinguaria – Crocallis elinguaria
- Phalaena melanaria – Arichanna melanaria
- Phalaena macularia – Pseudopanthera macularia
- Phalaena atomaria – Ematurga atomaria
- Phalaena pulveraria – Plagodis pulveraria
- Phalaena fasciaria – Hylaea fasciaria
- Phalaena betularia – Biston betularia
- Phalaena scopularia – Calliteara scopularia
- Phalaena wauaria – Macaria wauaria
- Phalaena tentacularia – Polypogon tentacularius
- Phalaena purpuraria – Lythria purpuraria
- Phalaena prosapiaria
- Phalaena punctaria – Cyclophora punctaria
- Phalaena teutonaria
- Phalaena pusaria – Cabera pusaria
- Phalaena papilionaria – Geometra papilionaria
- Phalaena tripunctaria – Nyctemera tripunctaria
- Phalaena tricinctaria
- Phalaena jatropharia
- Phalaena viridata – Chlorissa viridata
- Phalaena putata – Jodis putata
- Phalaena notata – Macaria notata
- Phalaena amata
- Phalaena repandata – Alcis repandata
- Phalaena dubitata – Triphosa dubitata
- Phalaena emarginata – Idaea emarginata
- Phalaena atrata – Odezia atrata
- Phalaena clathrata – Chiasmia clathrata
- Phalaena undulata – Hydria undulata
- Phalaena flaveolata
- Phalaena aestuata
- Phalaena grossulariata – Abraxas grossulariata
- Phalaena luteolata – Opisthograptis luteolata
- Phalaena populata – Eulithis populata
- Phalaena bilineata – Camptogramma bilineata
- Phalaena chenopodiata – Scotopteryx chenopodiata
- Phalaena comitata – Pelurga comitata
- Phalaena dotata
- Phalaena plagiata – Aplocera plagiata
- Phalaena miata – Chloroclysta miata
- Phalaena prunata – Eulithis prunata
- Phalaena aversata – Idaea aversata
- Phalaena tristata – Epirrhoe tristata
- Phalaena alchemillata – Perizoma alchemillata
- Phalaena hastata – Rheumaptera hastata
- Phalaena albicillata – Mesoleuca albicillata
- Phalaena marginata – Lomaspilis marginata
- Phalaena ocellata – Cosmorhoe ocellata
- Phalaena janata – Achaea janata
- Phalaena fluctuata – Xanthorhoe fluctuata
- Phalaena juniperata – Thera juniperata
- Phalaena incanata – Scopula incanata
- Phalaena immutata – Scopula immutata
- Phalaena immorata – Scopula immorata
- Phalaena remutata
- Phalaena succenturiata – Eupithecia succenturiata
- Phalaena strigilata – Pechipogo strigilata
- Phalaena didymata – Mesotype didymata
- Phalaena rectangulata – Pasiphila rectangulata
- Phalaena hortulata – Eurrhypara hortulata
- Phalaena nymphaeata – Nymphula nymphaeata
- Phalaena potamogata – Nymphula potamogata
- Phalaena stratiotata – Parapoynx stratiotata
- Phalaena lemnata – Cataclysta lemnata
- Phalaena cingulata – Pyrausta cingulata
- Phalaena brumata – Operophtera brumata

=== Tortrices ===
(Note: Except where otherwise indicated, the identities of Linnaeus' Tortrices are taken from Robinson & Nielsen (1983).)

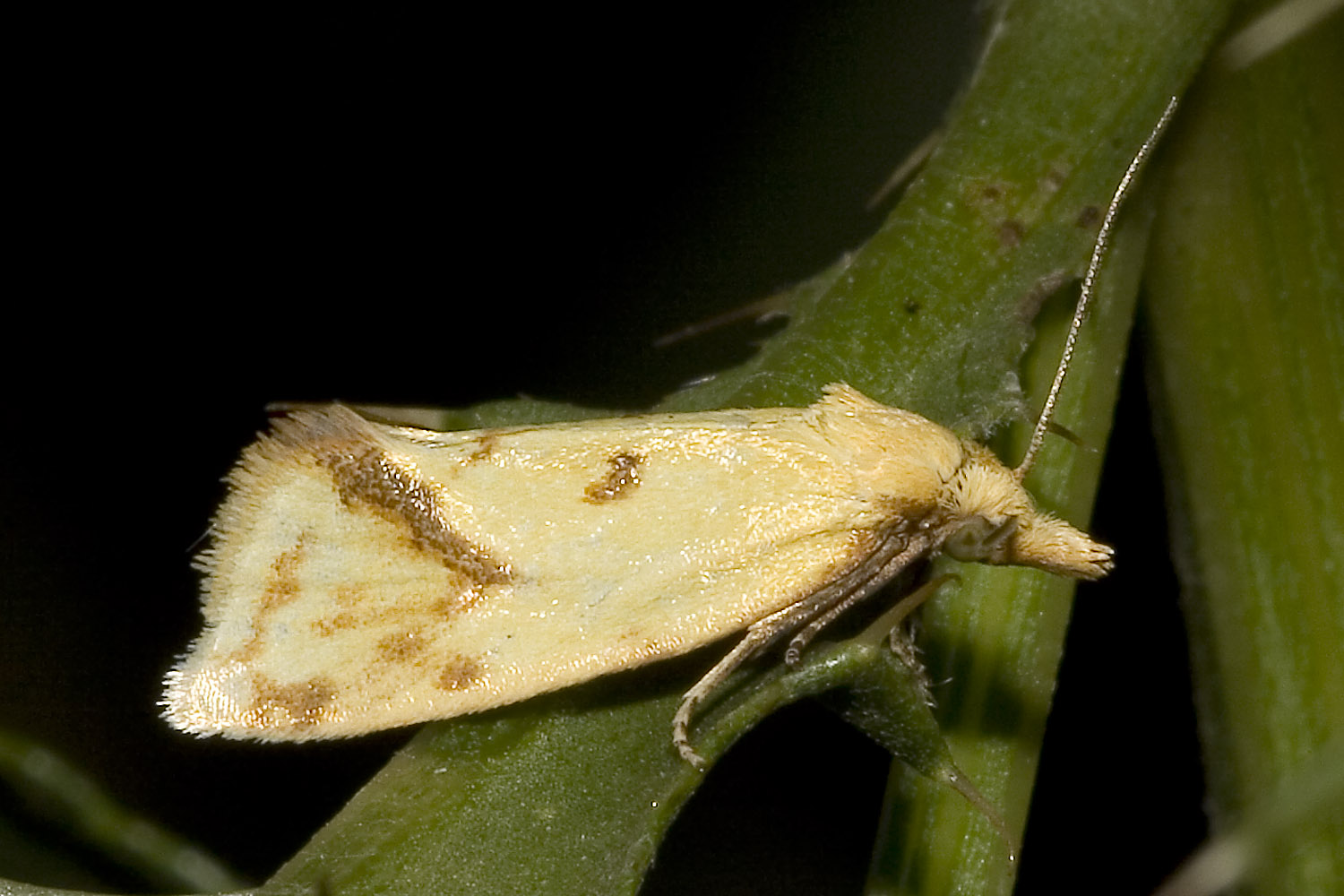
Agapeta hamana was described as Phalaena hamana in 1758.

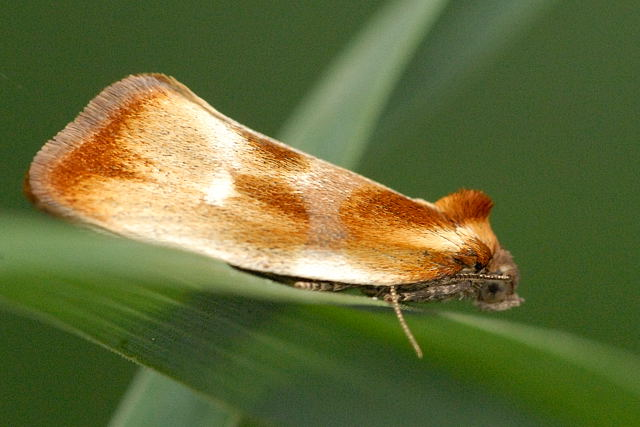
Eulia ministrana was described as Phalaena ministrana in 1758.

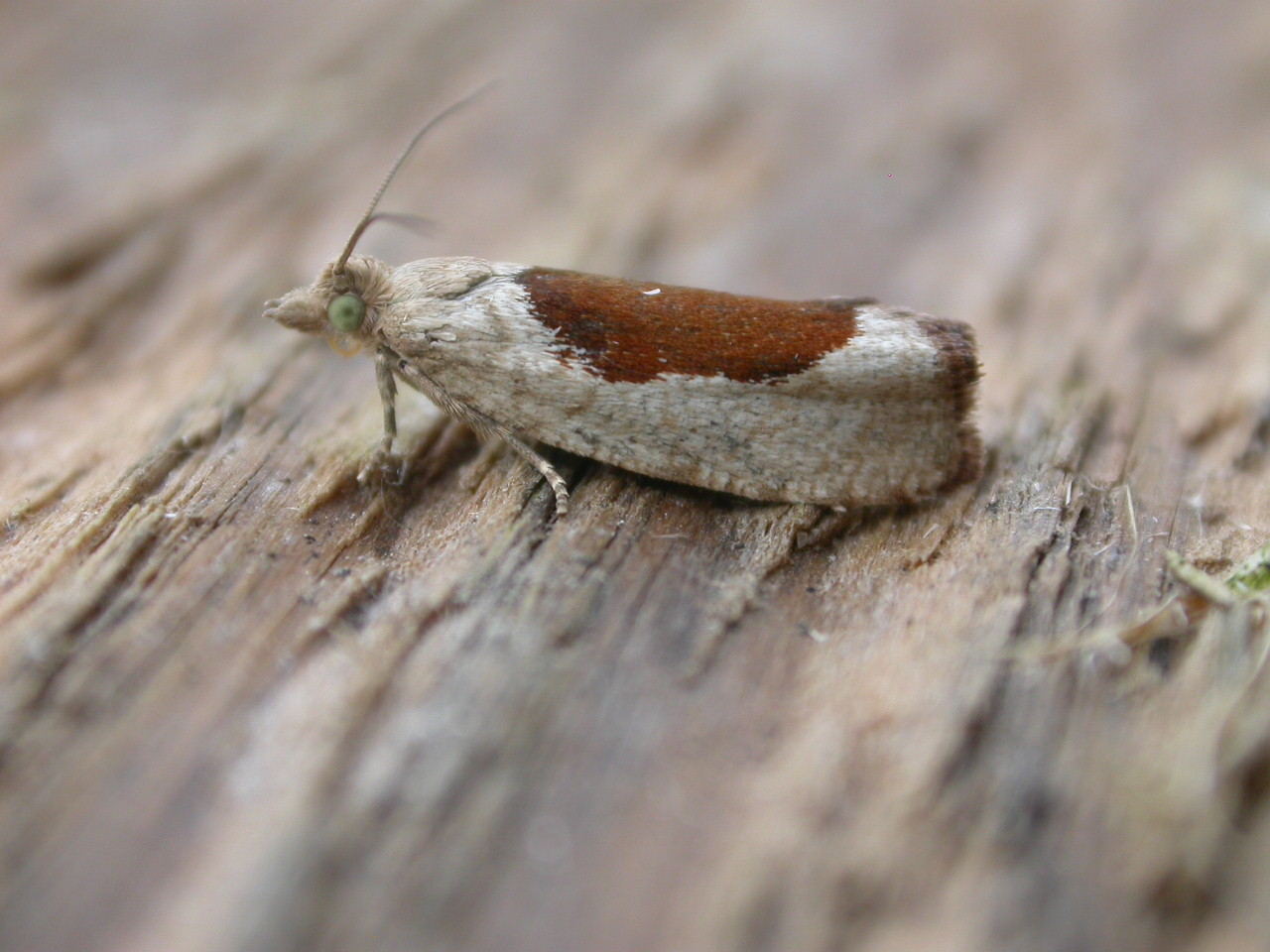
Epinotia solandriana was described as Phalaena solandriana in 1758.

- Phalaena prasinana – Pseudoips prasinanus
- Phalaena viridana – Tortrix viridana
- Phalaena literana – Acleris literana
- Phalaena hamana – Agapeta hamana
- Phalaena fuscana – synonym of Pseudosciaphila branderiana
- Phalaena oporana – Archips oporana
- Phalaena rosana – Archips rosana
- Phalaena xylosteana – Archips xylosteana
- Phalaena avellana – Archips avellana
- Phalaena ameriana – Archips ameriana
- Phalaena piceana – Archips piceana
- Phalaena ministrana – Eulia ministrana
- Phalaena rurinana – Clepsis rurinana
- Phalaena uddmanniana – Epiblema uddmanniana
- Phalaena lecheana – Ptycholoma lecheana
- Phalaena branderiana – Pseudosciaphila branderiana
- Phalaena forsskåleana – Acleris forsskaleana
- Phalaena loeflingiana – Aleimma loeflingiana
- Phalaena bergmanniana – Acleris bergmanniana
- Phalaena holmiana – Croesia holmiana
- Phalaena rolandriana – Clepsis rolandriana
- Phalaena solandriana – Epinotia solandriana
- Phalaena hastiana – Acleris hastiana
- Phalaena wahlbomiana – Pseudosciaphila wahlbomiana
- Phalaena lediana – Argyroploce lediana
- Phalaena heracliana – Agonopterix heracliana

=== Pyrales ===
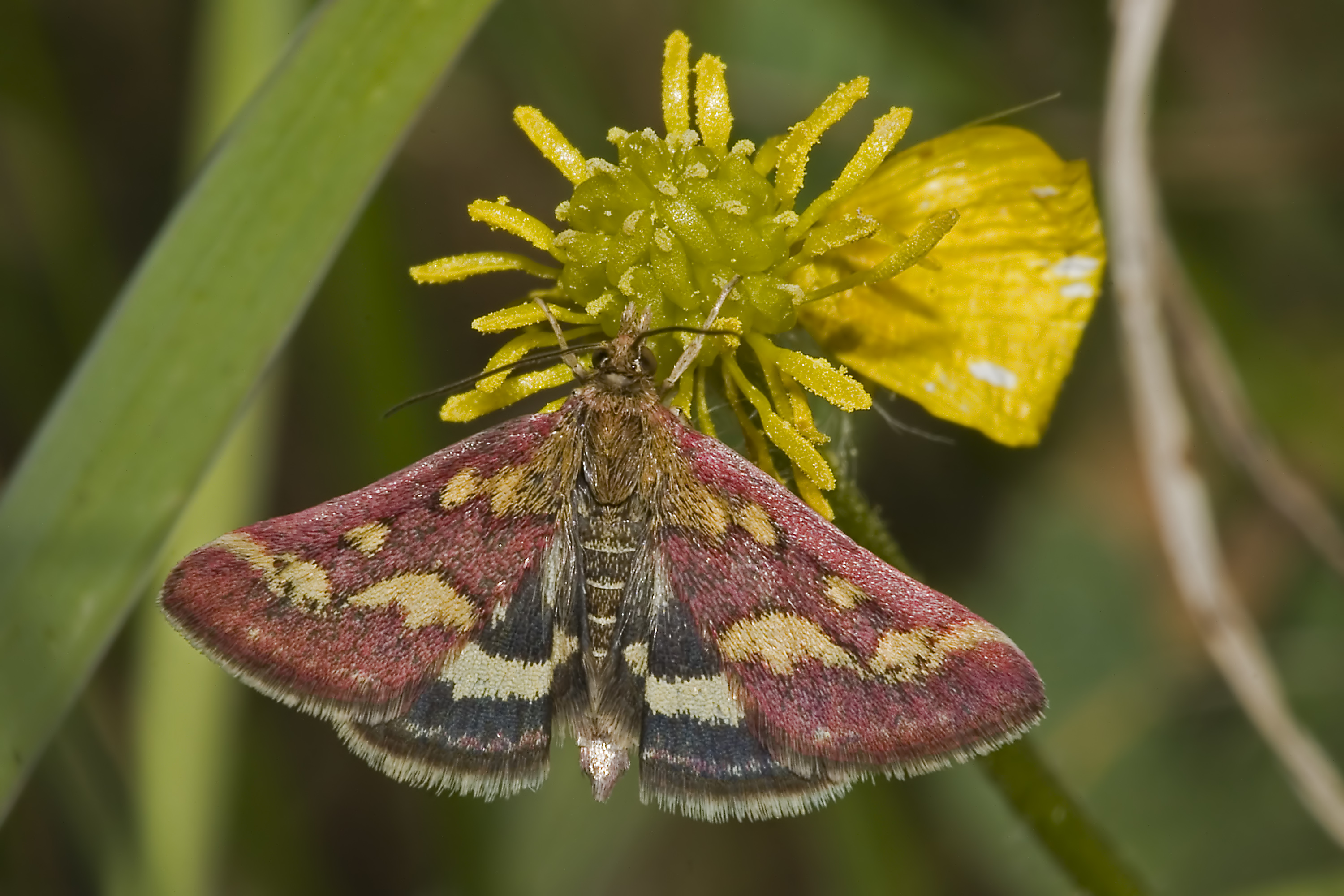
Pyrausta purpuralis was described as Phalaena purpualis in 1758.

(Note: The identities of all Linnaeus' Pyrales are taken from Robinson & Nielsen (1983).)

- Phalaena farinalis – Pyralis farinalis
- Phalaena glaucinalis – Orthopygia glaucinalis
- Phalaena proboscidalis – Hypena proboscidalis
- Phalaena rostralis – Hypena rostralis
- Phalaena forficalis – Evergestis forficalis
- Phalaena verticalis – Sitochroa verticalis
- Phalaena pinguinalis – Aglossa pinguinalis
- Phalaena purpuralis – Pyrausta purpuralis

=== Tineae ===
(Note: The identities of all Linnaeus' Tineae are taken from Robinson & Nielsen (1983).)

- Phalaena sociella – Aphomia sociella
- Phalaena colonella – Aphomia colonella
- Phalaena pusiella – Ethmia pusiella
- Phalaena bella – Utetheisa bella
- Phalaena pulchella – Utetheisa pulchella
- Phalaena evonymella – Yponomeuta evonymella
- Phalaena padella – Yponomeuta padella
- Phalaena irrorella – Setina irrorella
- Phalaena lutarella – Eilema lutarella
- Phalaena mesomella – Cybosia mesomella
- Phalaena pascuella – Crambus pascuella
- Phalaena pratella – Crambus pratella
- Phalaena culmella – Chrysoteuchia culmella
- Phalaena nemorella – Ypsolopha nemorella
- Phalaena foenella – Epiblema foenella
- Phalaena unguicella – Ancylis unguicella
- Phalaena salicella – Hedya salicella
- Phalaena cynosbatella – Epiblema cynosbatella
- Phalaena vestianella – Coleophora vestianella
- Phalaena tapetzella – Trichophaga tapetzella
- Phalaena pellionella – Tinea pellionella
- Phalaena sarcitrella – Endrosis sarcitrella
- Phalaena minutella – Borkhausenia minutella
- Phalaena mellonella – Galleria mellonella
- Phalaena cucullatella – Nola cucullatella
- Phalaena granella – Nemapogon granella
- Phalaena lappella – Metzneria lappella
- Phalaena proletella – Aleyrodes proletella
- Phalaena arbutella – Argyroploce arbutella
- Phalaena tessella – Pseudotelphusa tessella
- Phalaena vittella – Ypsolopha vittella
- Phalaena xylostella – Plutella xylostella
- Phalaena trigonella – Epinotia trigonella
- Phalaena rhomboidella – Hypatima rhomboidella
- Phalaena tertianella – [nomen dubium]
- Phalaena mercurella – Eudonia mercurella
- Phalaena pomonella – Cydia pomonella
- Phalaena strobilella – Cydia strobilella
- Phalaena pinella – Catoptria pinella
- Phalaena turionella – Blastesthia turionella
- Phalaena dodecella – Exoteleia dodecella
- Phalaena resinella – Retinia resinella
- Phalaena fuscella – Niditinea fuscella
- Phalaena corticella – Lampronia corticella
- Phalaena stipella – Schiffermuelleria stipella
- Phalaena gemmella – Stenolechia gemmella
- Phalaena bractella – Oecophora bractella
- Phalaena ramella – Epinotia ramella
- Phalaena porrectella – Plutella porrectella
- Phalaena petiverella – Dichrorampha petiverella
- Phalaena swammerdamella – Nematopogon swammerdamella
- Phalaena reaumurella – Adela reaumurella
- Phalaena De Geerella – Nemophora degeerella
- Phalaena mouffetella – Athrips mouffetella
- Phalaena listerella – Solenobia listerella
- Phalaena frischella – Coleophora frischella
- Phalaena albinella – Dichrorampha albinella
- Phalaena goedartella – Argyresthia goedartella
- Phalaena merianella – synonym of Eulamprotes wilkella
- Phalaena wilkella – Eulamprotes wilkella
- Phalaena lyonnetella – [nomen dubium]
- Phalaena bonnetella – Argyresthia bonnetella
- Phalaena schaefferella – Schiffermuelleria schaefferella
- Phalaena roesella – Heliodines roesella
- Phalaena rajella – Phyllonorycter rajella
- Phalaena clerkella – Lyonetia clerkella

=== Alucitae ===
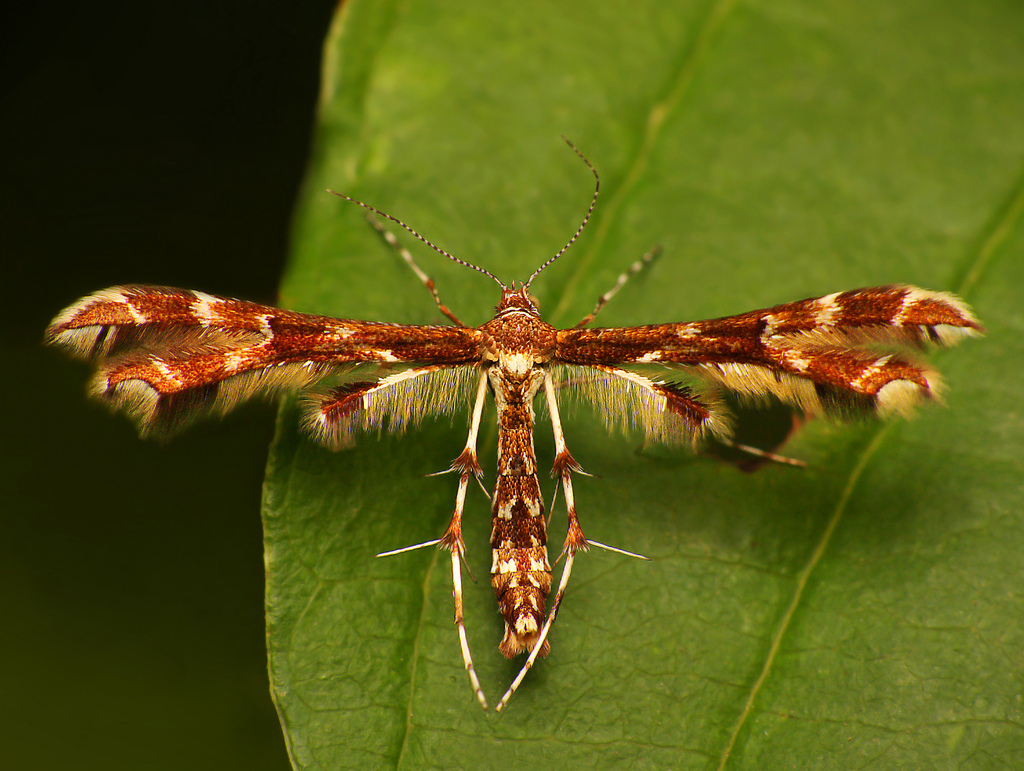
Geina didactyla was described as Phalaena didactyla in 1758.

(Note: The identities of all Linnaeus' Alucitae are taken from Robinson & Nielsen (1983).)

- Phalaena monodactyla – Emmelina monodactyla
- Phalaena didactyla – Geina didactyla
- Phalaena tridactyla – Merrifieldia tridactyla
- Phalaena tetradactyla – Pterophorus tetradactyla
- Phalaena pentadactyla – Pterophorus pentadactyla
- Phalaena hexadactyla – Alucita hexadactyla
