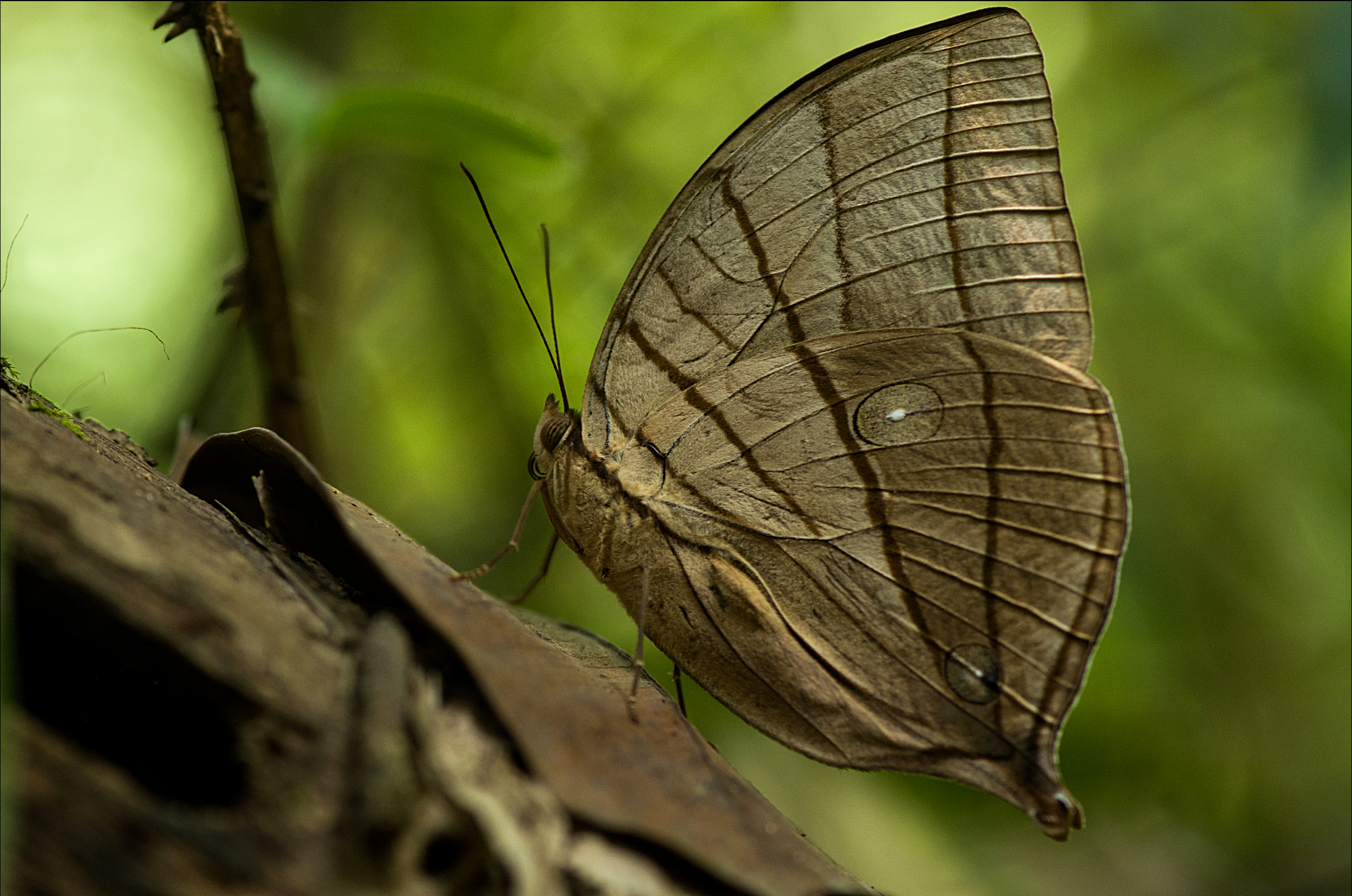
- Amathuxidia amythaon

Scientific classification
- Kingdom: Animalia
- Phylum: Arthropoda
- Clade: Pancrustacea
- Class: Insecta
- Order: Lepidoptera
- Family: Nymphalidae
- Subfamily: Morphinae
- Tribe: Amathusiini

Genera
- 15, see text

Synonyms
- Amathusiinae; Amathusiidae

= Amathusiini =

Tribe of butterflies

Amathusiini is a tribe of the nymphalid butterfly subfamily Morphinae. They are large butterflies. They are sometimes treated as a distinct subfamily Amathusiinae or family Amathusiidae.

== Genera and selected species ==
- Aemona
  - Aemona amathusia – yellow dryad
  - Aemona lena – white dryad
- Amathusia
  - Amathusia andamanensis – Andaman palmking
  - Amathusia phidippus – palmking
- Amathuxidia
  - Amathuxidia amythaon – koh-i-noor
- Discophora
  - Discophora deo – banded duffer
  - Discophora lepida – southern duffer
  - Discophora sondaica – common duffer
  - Discophora timora – great duffer
- Enispe
  - Enispe euthymius – red caliph
  - Enispe cycnus – blue caliph
  - Enispe intermedia
- Faunis
- Melanocyma
- Morphopsis
- Stichophthalma
  - Stichophthalma camadeva – northern jungle queen
  - Stichophthalma nourmahal – chocolate jungle queen
  - Stichophthalma sparta – Manipur jungle queen
- Taenaris
- Thaumantis
  - Thaumantis diores – jungle glory
- Thauria
  - Thauria aliris – tufted jungleking
  - Thauria lathyi – jungleking
- Xanthotaenia
- Zeuxidia
