= Duffer =

Duffer may refer to:

- Duffer (Narnia), invisible dwarves in The Chronicles of Narnia
- the Duffer Brothers, American film and television show makers known for their role on Stranger Things
- Duffer, in Australian English, a person occupied in cattle raiding
- A weak player in the game of chess
- Students organized to boost the spirit of the school during athletic and social events, often brought together during pep rallies.

In biology:

- Discophora (butterfly), a genus of butterflies commonly known as duffers
  - Banded duffer (Discophora deo), a butterfly found in Asia
  - Common duffer (Discophora sondaica), a butterfly found in Southeast Asia
  - Great duffer (Discophora timora), a butterfly found in South Asia
  - Southern duffer (Discophora lepida), a butterfly found in India

== See also ==
- The Defence of Duffer's Drift, a 1904 book by Ernest Dunlop Swinton
