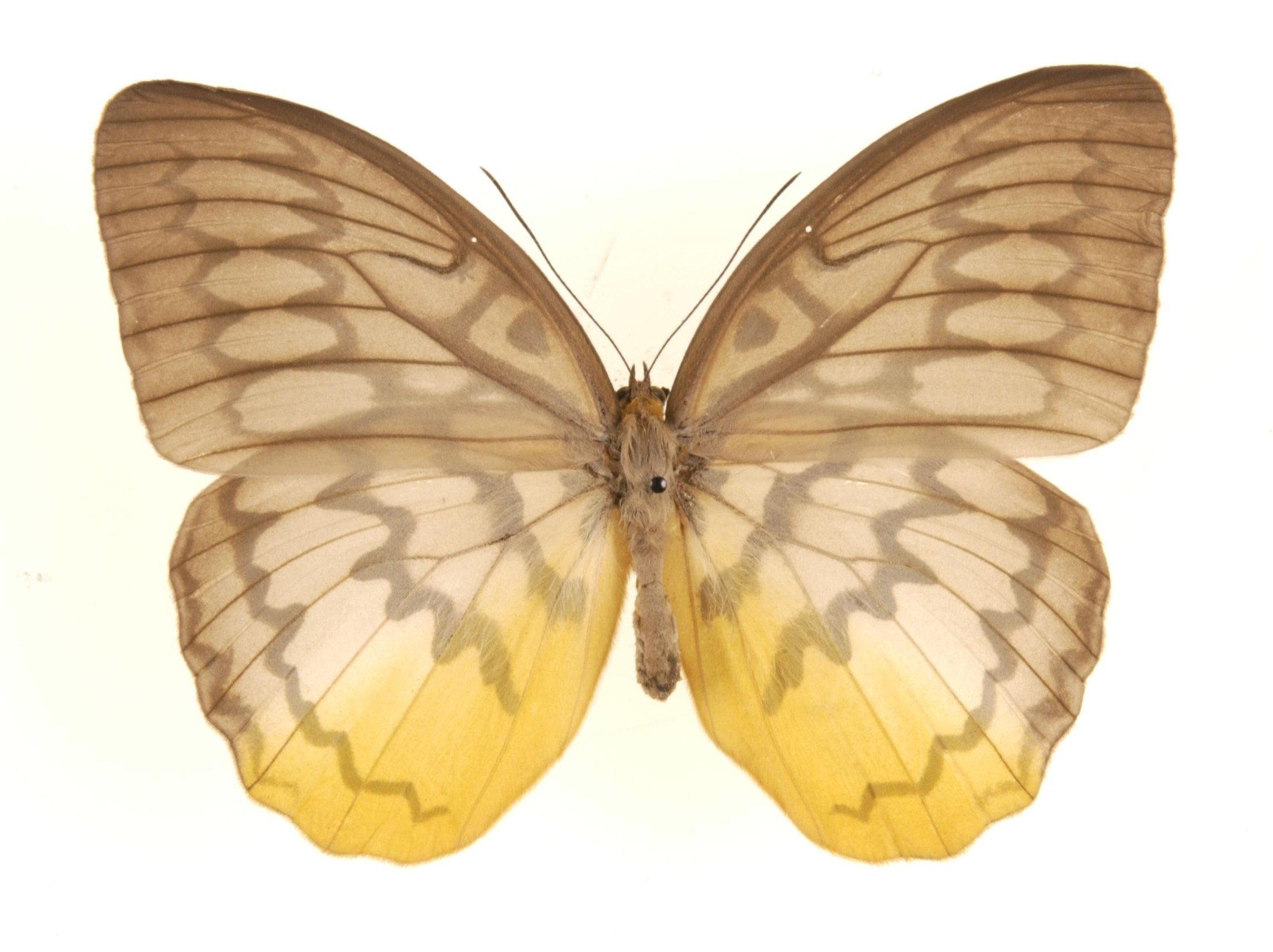

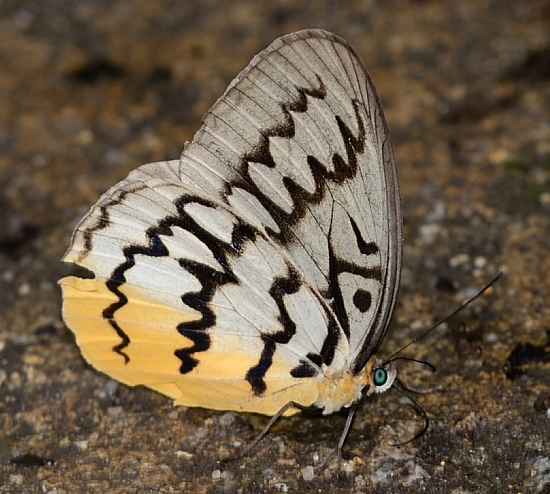

Scientific classification
- Kingdom: Animalia
- Phylum: Arthropoda
- Class: Insecta
- Order: Lepidoptera
- Family: Nymphalidae
- Tribe: Amathusiini
- Genus: Melanocyma; Westwood, 1858
- Species: M. faunula

Binomial name
- Melanocyma faunula (Westwood, 1850)

= Melanocyma =

Pallid faun

Monotypic brush-footed butterfly genus

Melanocyma is a monotypic butterfly genus in the subfamily Morphinae of the family Nymphalidae. Its one species Melanocyma faunula, the pallid faun, is restricted to Burma, Malaya, Thailand and Indochina in the Indomalayan realm.

The wingspan of M. faunula is at around 90 millimetres. Individuals found in lowland forests are often smaller than specimens of M. faunula found on hills.

There are two subspecies, M. f. kimurai and M. f. faunula

== Life History ==
M. faunula individuals are known to breed in primary rainforest. They are often seen in flight in the mid-story of primary rainforest. Individuals are often known to be baited with rotting fruit. They are known to be commonly found in hill stations.

The Pallid Faun's larvae feed on Orania sylvicola. Their eggs hatch after 11 days, hatching within 12 hours. The eggs are 1.1 millimeters in diameter, and are yellow in colour changing to black with time. The Pallid Faun exhibits similar egg laying and feeding behaviour with Taenaris onolaus.

== Gallery ==
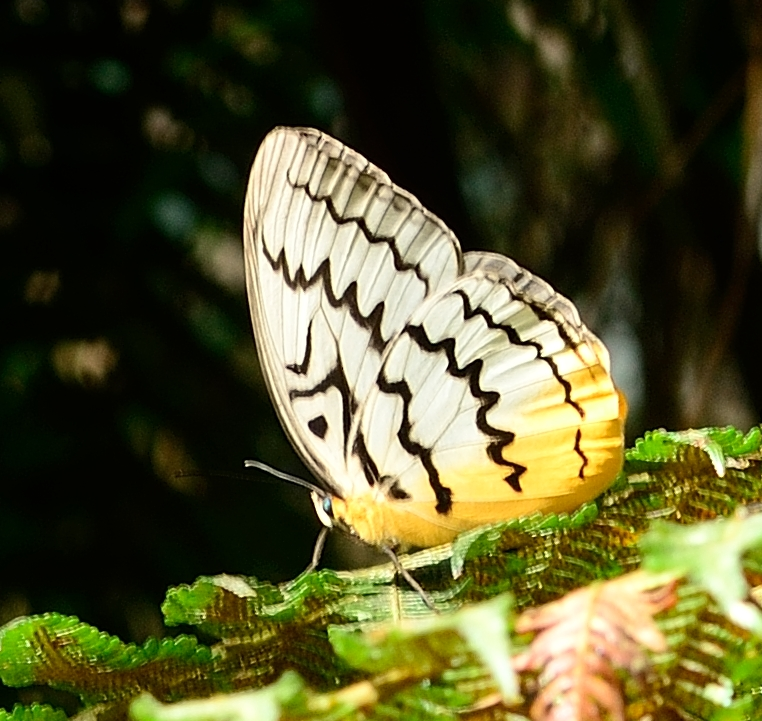
Pallid Faun (location: Cameron Highlands, Malaysia)

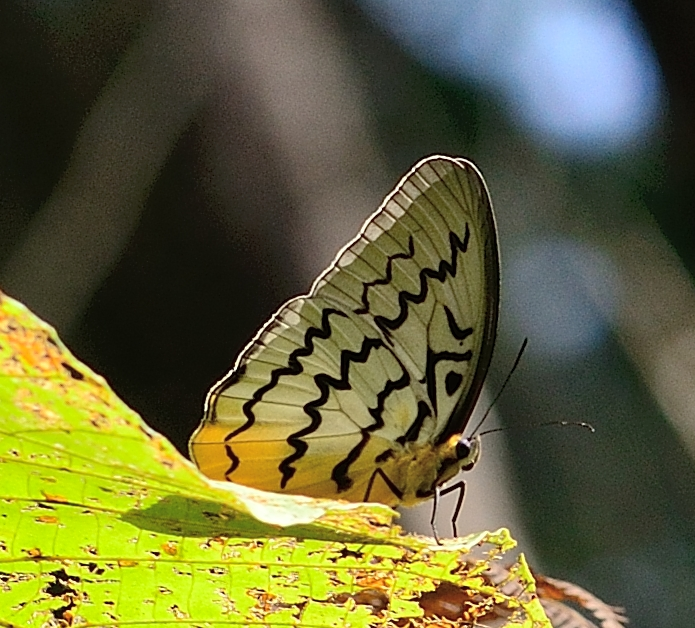
Pallid Faun (location: Cameron Highlands, Malaysia)
