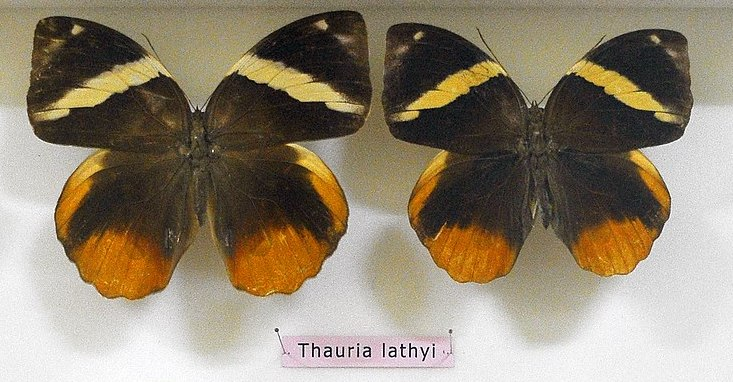

Scientific classification
- Domain: Eukaryota
- Kingdom: Animalia
- Phylum: Arthropoda
- Class: Insecta
- Order: Lepidoptera
- Family: Nymphalidae
- Genus: Thauria
- Species: T. lathyi

Binomial name
- Thauria lathyi Frühstorfer, 1902

= Thauria lathyi =

Jungleking

Species of butterfly

Thauria lathyi, the jungleking, is a butterfly found in South Asia that belongs to the Morphinae subfamily of the brush-footed butterflies family.

== Distribution ==
The jungleking ranges from Manipur to southern Myanmar. and Indochina.

A related species, the tufted jungleking (Thauria aliris Frühstorfer, 1902) occurs in Asia.

== Status ==
Evans reports the butterfly as rare in its range.

== Etymology ==
The name honours Percy Ireland Lathy.

== See also ==
- List of butterflies of India
- List of butterflies of India (Morphinae)
- List of butterflies of India (Nymphalidae)
