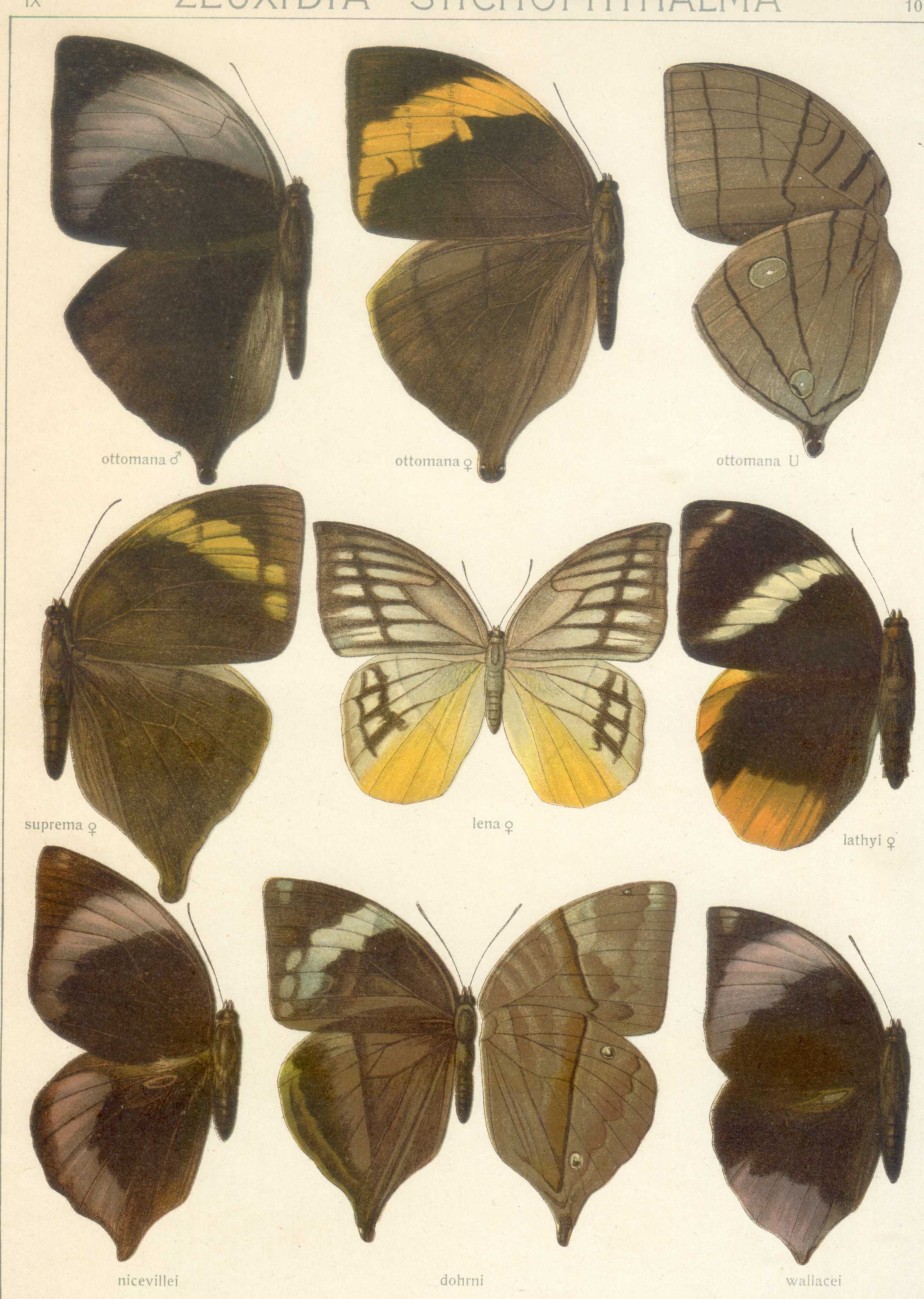
- Amathuxidia amythaon ottomana and Amathuxidia plateni suprema with related species in Seitz

Scientific classification
- Kingdom: Animalia
- Phylum: Arthropoda
- Clade: Pancrustacea
- Class: Insecta
- Order: Lepidoptera
- Family: Nymphalidae
- Subfamily: Morphinae
- Tribe: Amathusiini
- Genus: Amathuxidia; Staudinger, [1887]

Synonyms
- Zeuxamathusia Staudinger, [1887]

= Amathuxidia =

Genus of brush-footed butterflies

Amathuxidia, commonly known as the koh-i-noors, is a genus of butterflies in the family Nymphalidae. They are large showy butterflies, brown with blue forewing bands and hindwing "tails". They range from Indochina to Sulawesi.

== Species ==
- Amathuxidia amythaon (Doubleday, 1847) – koh-i-noor
- Amathuxidia plateni (Staudinger, [1887]) – Platen's koh-i-noor

See also Amathuxidia morishitai Chou & Gu, 1994, later treated as a subspecies Amathuxidia amythaon morishitai Chou & Gu, 1994
