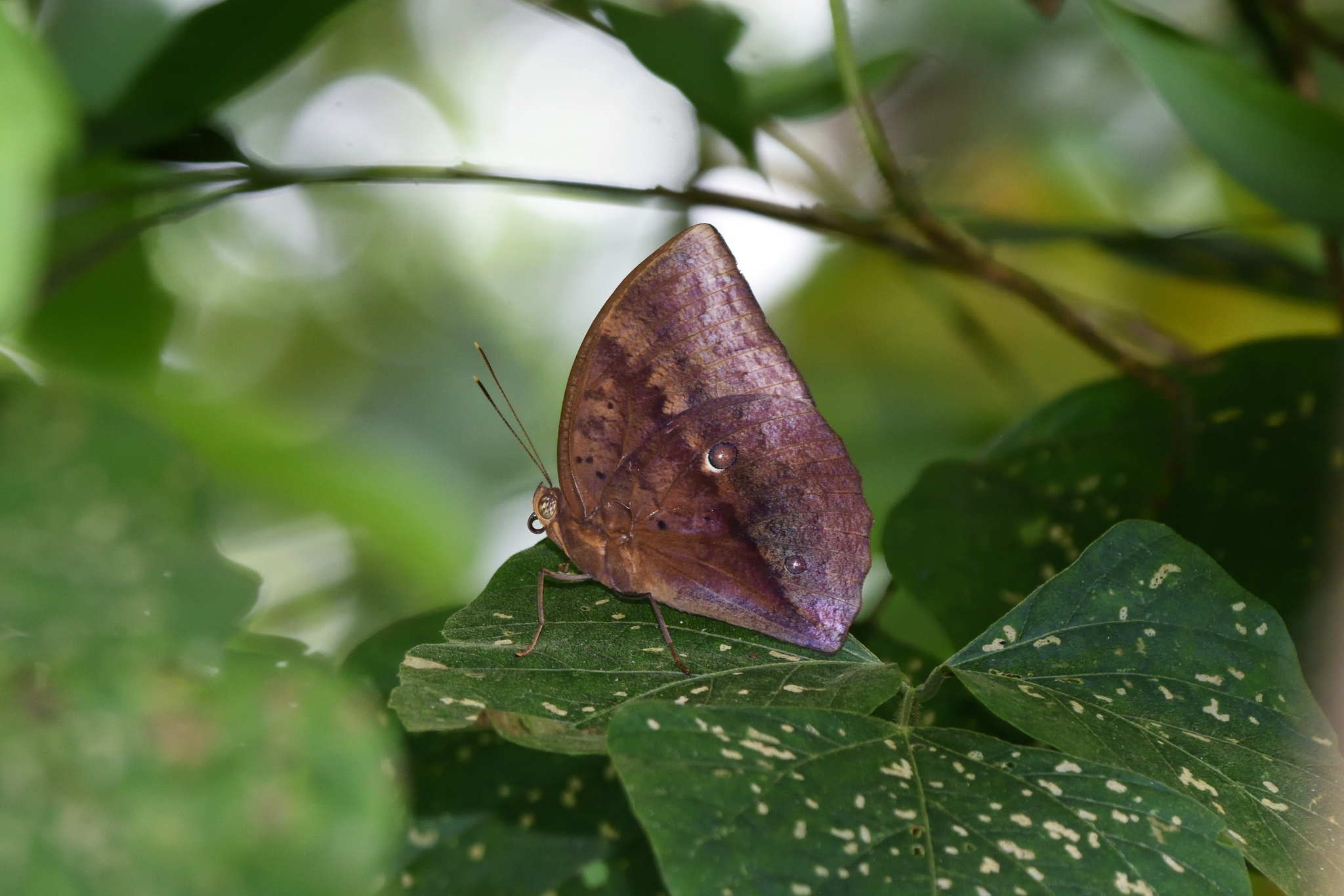

Scientific classification
- Kingdom: Animalia
- Phylum: Arthropoda
- Class: Insecta
- Order: Lepidoptera
- Family: Nymphalidae
- Genus: Discophora
- Species: D. necho

Binomial name
- Discophora necho (C. Felder & R. Felder, 1867)

= Discophora necho =

Blue duffer

Species of butterfly

Discophora necho, the blue duffer, is a species of butterfly in the duffers group, that is, the Morphinae subfamily of the brush-footed butterflies family.
