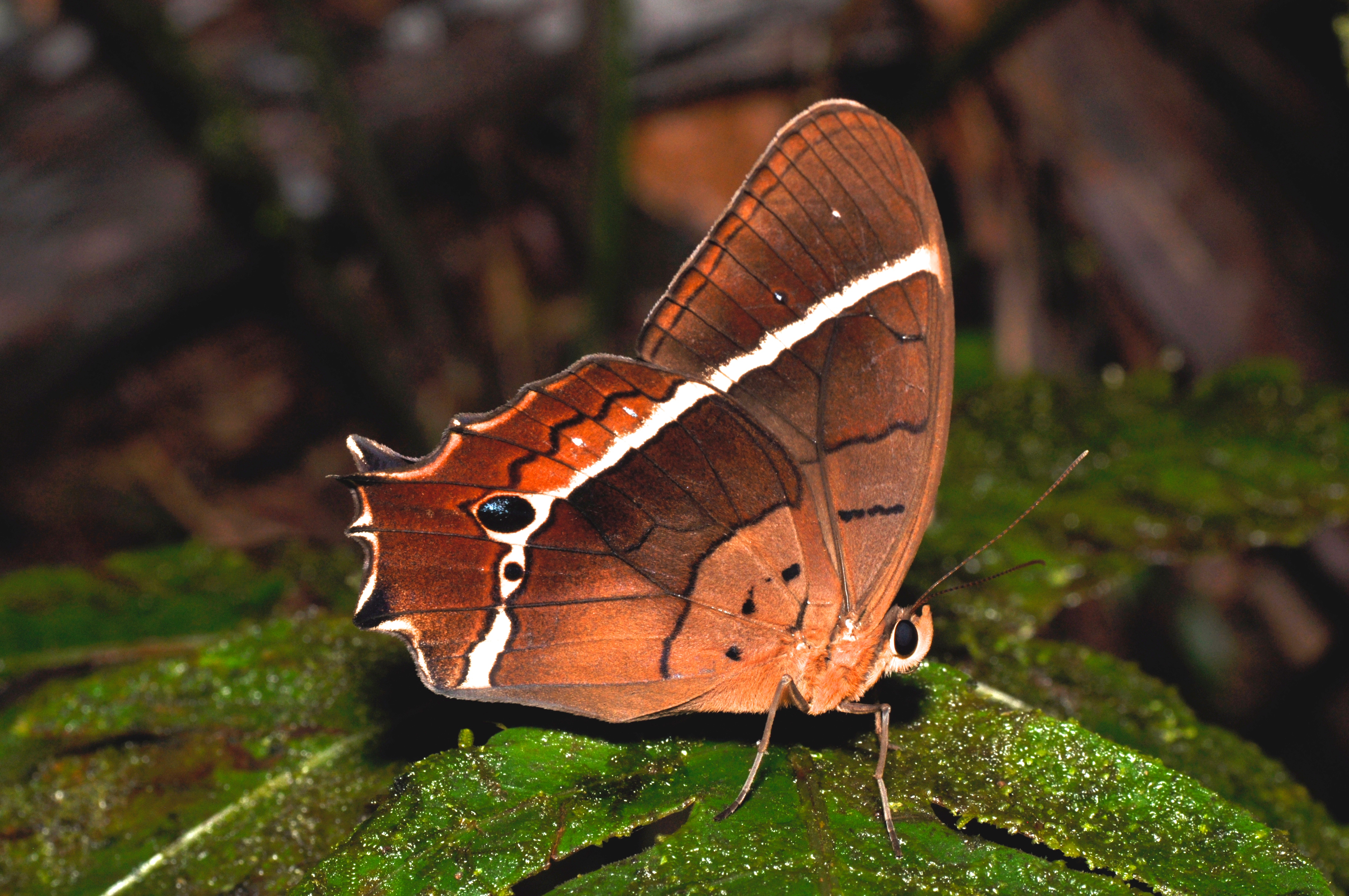
- Antirrhea philoctetes

Scientific classification
- Domain: Eukaryota
- Kingdom: Animalia
- Phylum: Arthropoda
- Class: Insecta
- Order: Lepidoptera
- Family: Nymphalidae
- Subfamily: Morphinae
- Tribe: Morphini

Genera
- See text

= Morphini =

Tribe of butterflies

Morphini is a tribe of nymphalid butterflies in the subfamily Morphinae.

== Classification ==
Listed alphabetically:

Subtribe Antirrheina:

- Antirrhea Hübner, [1822]
- Caerois Hübner, [1819]

Subtribe Morphina:

- Morpho Fabricius, 1807
