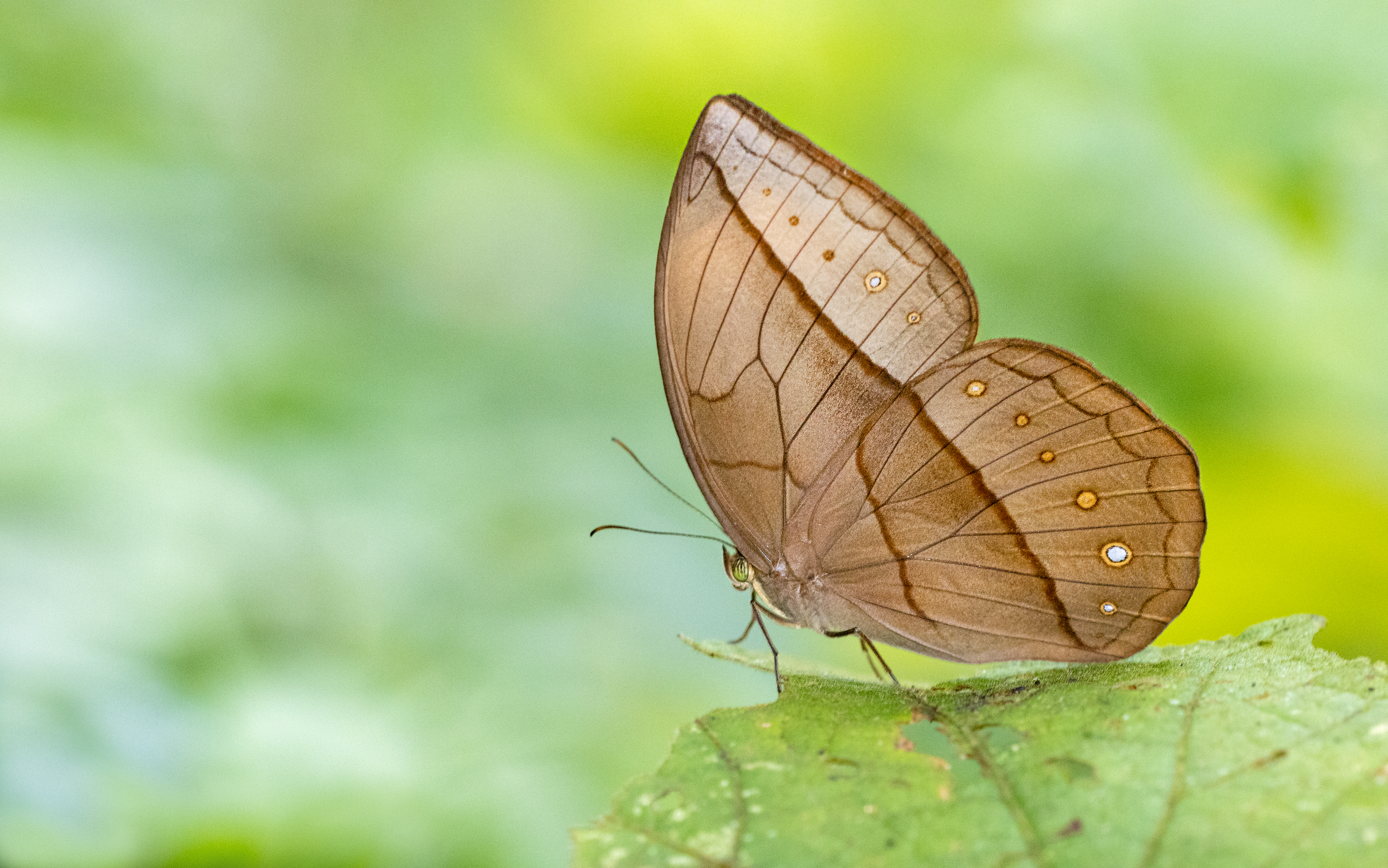

Scientific classification
- Kingdom: Animalia
- Phylum: Arthropoda
- Class: Insecta
- Order: Lepidoptera
- Family: Nymphalidae
- Genus: Aemona
- Species: A. amathusia

Binomial name
- Aemona amathusia (Hewitson, 1867)

= Aemona amathusia =

Yellow dryad

Species of butterfly

Aemona amathusia, the yellow dryad, is a butterfly found in Asia that belongs to the Morphinae subfamily of the brush-footed butterflies family.

Two geographical races of this have been discovered, namely amathusia Hew. from North India, probably first obtained from Bhutan, and more recently found in Assam. Hewitson's figure refers to the dry season form; male upper surface yellow with a red-brown longitudinal line beyond the cell, which crosses both wings, and with a dentate submarginal band on the hindwings. Under side with a small white ocellus in the anal angle of the forewing, and six tiny ocelli in the submarginal area of the hindwing. female with blackish apex and lighter ochre-yellow median area on the forewings, also broader red-brown longitudinal bands on the underside. — peali Wood-Mas.[ now species] considered by Doherty to be the wet season form, and he is probably right in this, for the rounder wings and more prominent eye-spots, which also show through above and are distinctly black centred, form the only differentiating characters, peali has hitherto been observed only in Upper Assam. Flies in September to December, whereas amathusia is known also from the Khasia-, Garo- and Naga Hills. oberthuri Stich. (described in Vol. I, p. 156 and there figured on PI. 49 e) is the rare west-Chinese local form and considerably darker than the Himalaya race.

== Distribution ==
In South Asia the yellow dryad ranges from Sikkim, Bhutan, Assam, Manipur onto northern Myanmar. It also occurs in Vietnam and western China.

A related species, the white dryad (Aemona lena Atkinson), is found in South-East Asia.

== Status ==
In 1932, William Harry Evans wrote that it was rare in its Indian range.
