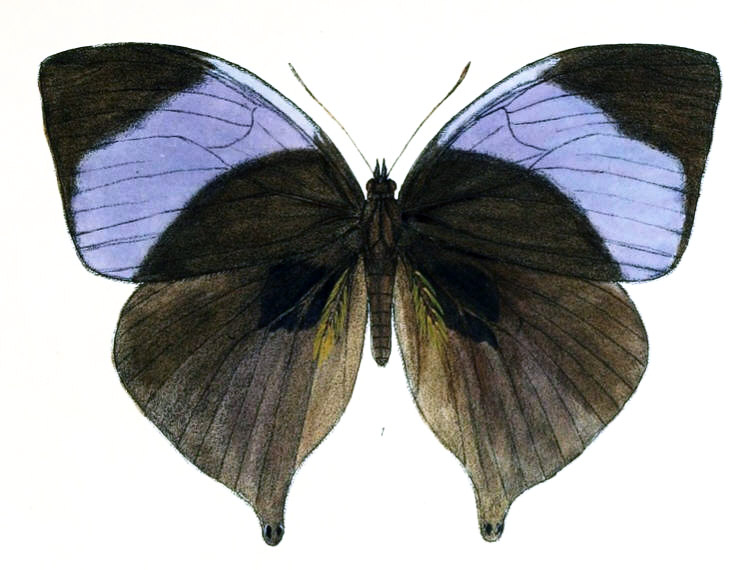

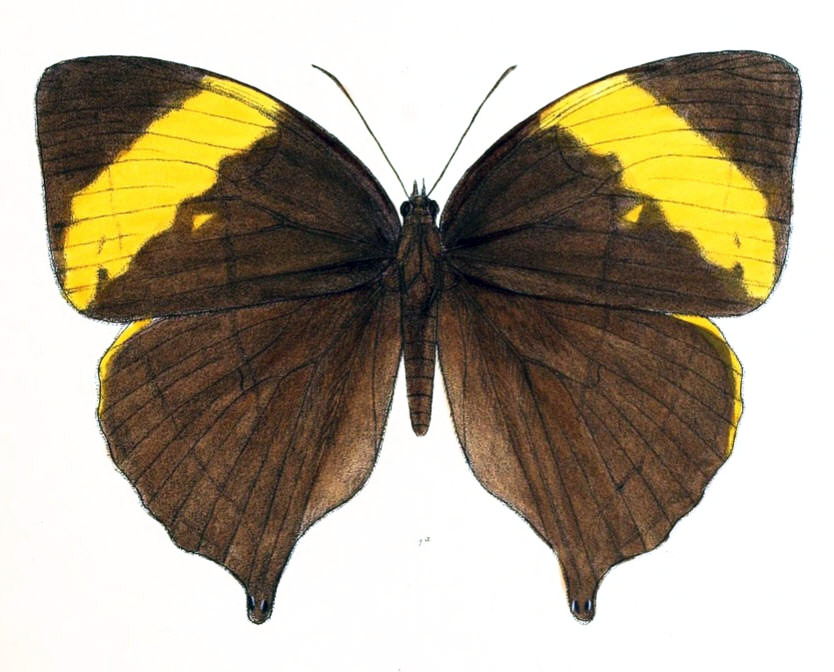

Scientific classification
- Kingdom: Animalia
- Phylum: Arthropoda
- Class: Insecta
- Order: Lepidoptera
- Family: Nymphalidae
- Genus: Amathuxidia
- Species: A. amythaon

Binomial name
- Amathuxidia amythaon (Doubleday, 1847)

Synonyms
- Amathusia amythaon

= Amathuxidia amythaon =

Species of butterfly

Amathuxidia amythaon, the koh-i-noor, is a butterfly found in Asia. It belongs to the Morphinae, a subfamily of the brush-footed butterflies.

== Distribution ==
The koh-i-noor ranges from in India from Sikkim to Assam and onto Myanmar. The butterfly has a wide range in Southeast Asia, from Malaysia to the Indonesian archipelago (Sumatra, Borneo, Enggano and Java) and the Philippines (Leyte, Samar, Panaon, Negros and Mindanao).

William Harry Evans and Mark Alexander Wynter-Blyth reported the butterfly to be rare west of Myanmar in the early-mid 20th century.

== Description ==
The male's upperside is brownish black with white cilia. There is a broad pale blue discal band extending from costa to near apex of vein 1. Hindwing uniform without markings. Underside pinkish buff, with the following dark brown lines crossing both forewing and hindwing: basal, extending to little beyond the middle of vein 2 in the hindwing, subbasal crossing from subcostal of the forewing to median vein of hindwing, discal from costa of the forewing to near tornus of hindwing, postdiscal from costa of the forewing to tornus of hindwing, thence bending upwards at an angle and following the dorsal margin of hindwing, and subterminal somewhat indistinct on the forewing, well defined and broadening towards tornus of hindwing. In addition to these there are on the forewing a short line of the same colour crossing the cell near apex and a discal line from costa to vein 2, and on the hindwing a large ochraceous postdiscal ocellus in interspace 2 and another in interspace 6. Antennae brown; head, thorax and abdomen dark brown. Sex-marks a patch of specialized scales in cell, extending into interspaces 1 and 2, and a glandular fold near base of vein with a stifle brush of hairs beneath it.

Female has the upperside umber brown. Forewing with a band as in the male, but bright yellow, narrower, reaching to the tornus, its inner margin very irregularly zigzag and sinuous, a spot below it in the middle. Hindwing uniform, apex bright yellow. Underside as in the male, but the ground colour paler.

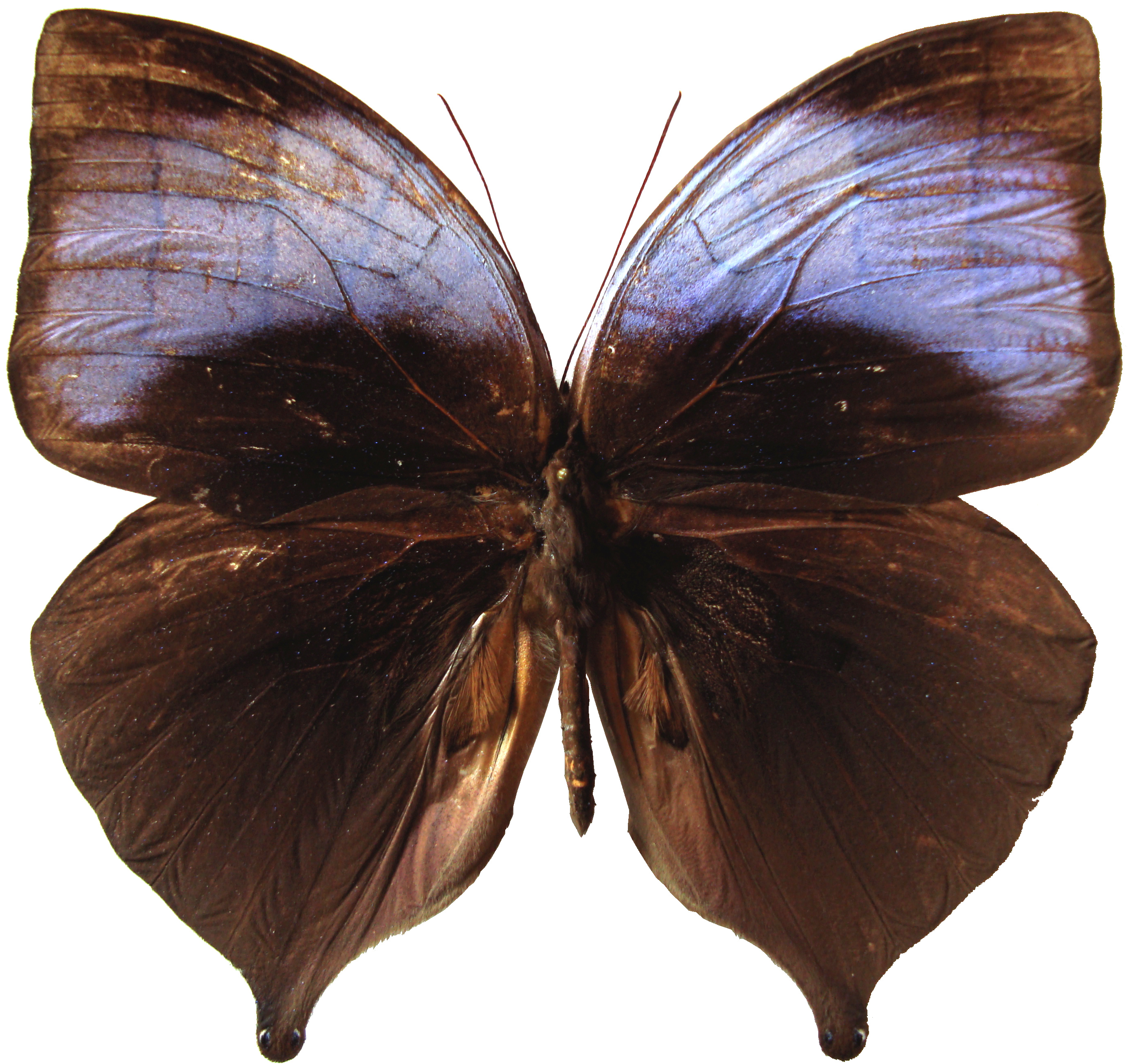
Amathuxidia amythaon dilucida male from Malaysia

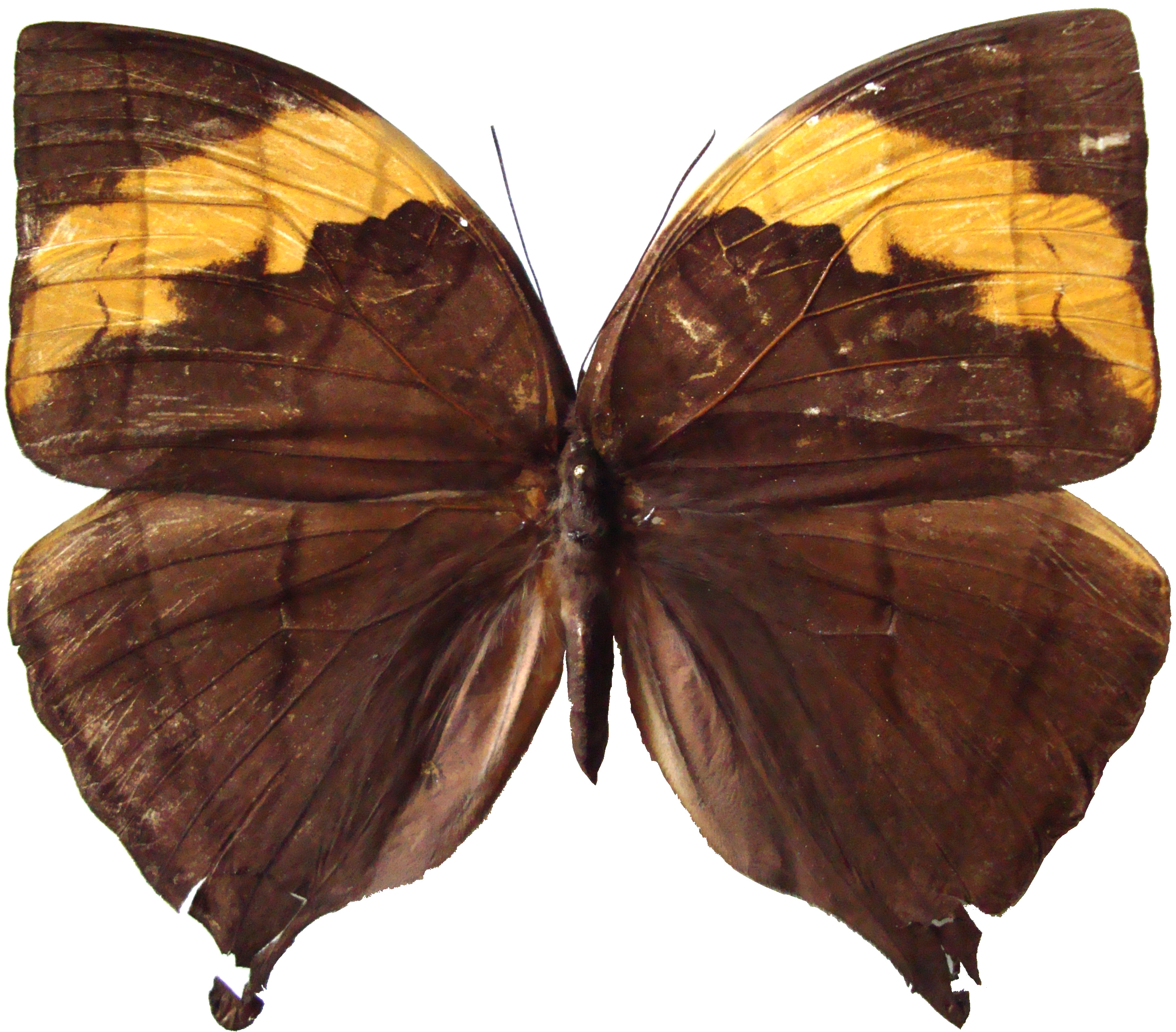
Amathuxidia amythaon dilucida female from Malaysia
