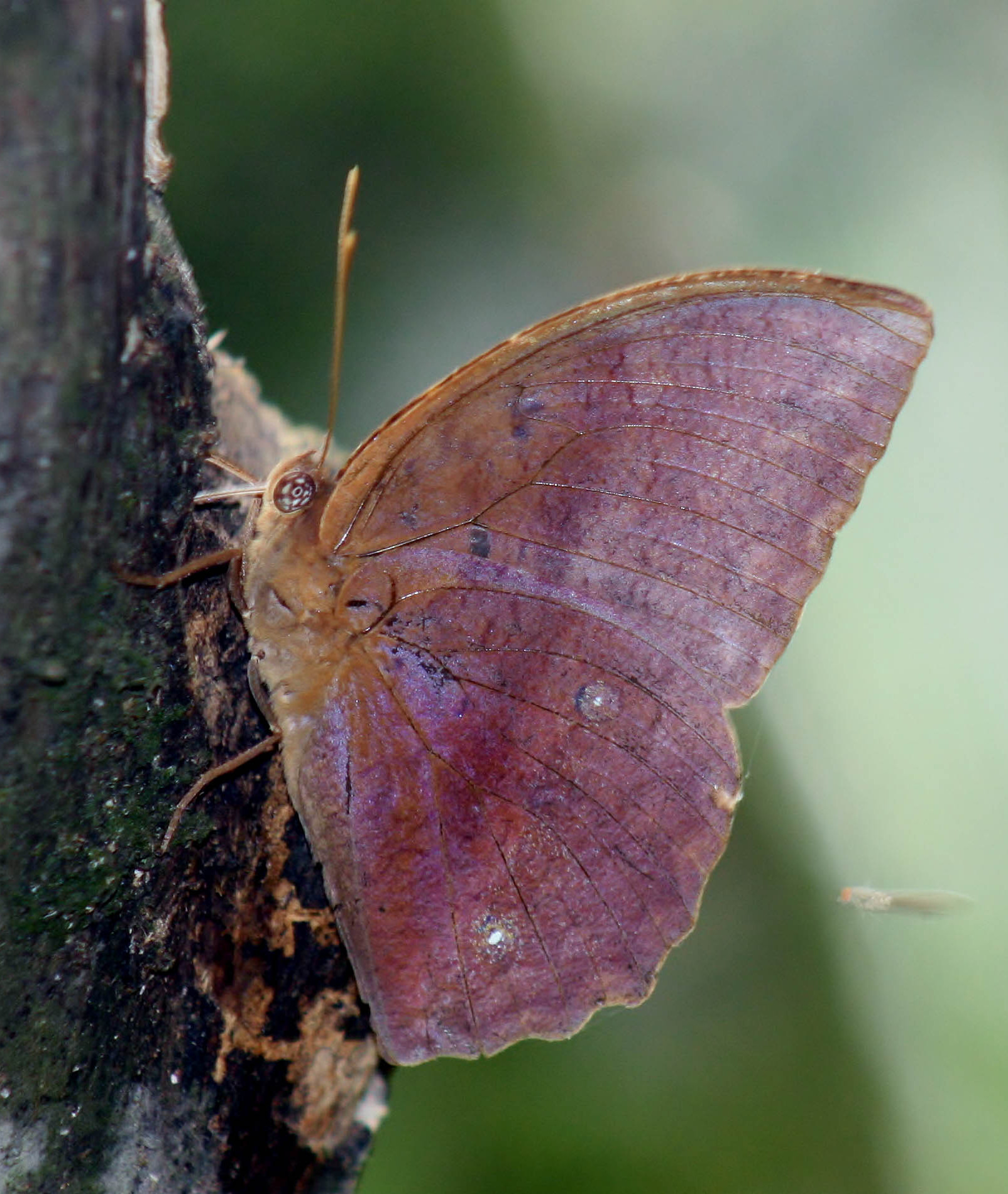

Scientific classification
- Domain: Eukaryota
- Kingdom: Animalia
- Phylum: Arthropoda
- Class: Insecta
- Order: Lepidoptera
- Family: Nymphalidae
- Subfamily: Morphinae
- Tribe: Amathusiini
- Genus: Discophora; Butler, 1877

Synonyms
- Zerynthia Hübner, [1825] (preocc.)

= Discophora (butterfly) =

Genus of brush-footed butterflies

Discophora, commonly known as the duffers, is a genus of butterflies in the family Nymphalidae. The members are confined to India, China and Southeast Asia.

== Species ==
- Discophora bambusae C. & R. Felder, [1867]
- Discophora celinde (Stoll, [1790])
- Discophora deo de Nicéville, 1898
- Discophora dodong Schröder & Treadaway, 1981
- Discophora lepida (Moore, 1857)
- Discophora necho C. & R. Felder, [1867]
- Discophora ogina (Godart, [1824])
- Discophora philippina Moore, [1895]
- Discophora simplex Staudinger, 1889
- Discophora sondaica Boisduval, 1836
- Discophora timora Westwood, [1850]
