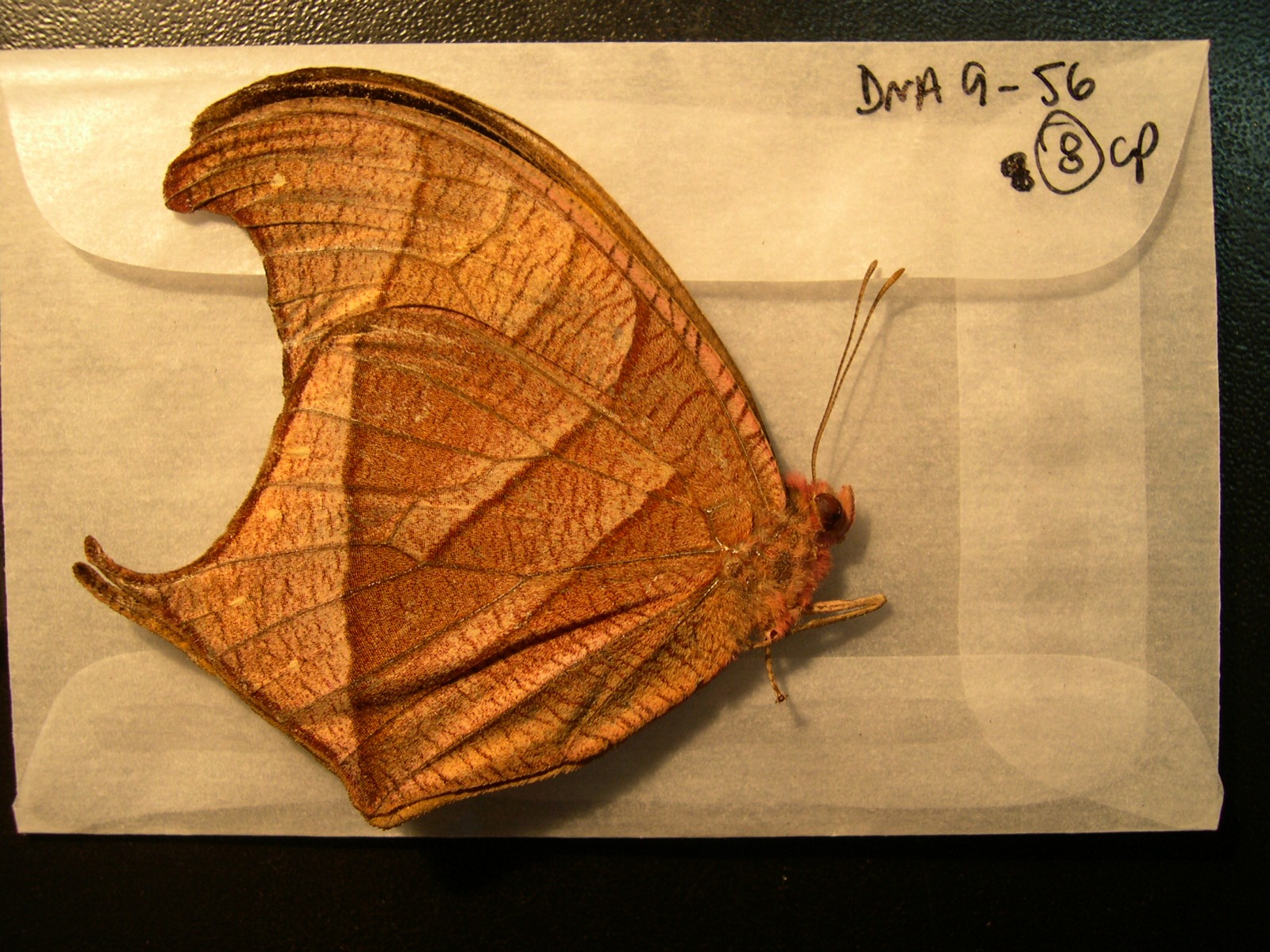

Scientific classification
- Kingdom: Animalia
- Phylum: Arthropoda
- Class: Insecta
- Order: Lepidoptera
- Family: Nymphalidae
- Genus: Caerois
- Species: C. chorinaeus

Binomial name
- Caerois chorinaeus (Fabricius, 1775)

Synonyms
- Papilio chorinaeus Fabricius, 1775; Papilio arcesilaus Sulzer, 1776; Caerois arcesilaë Hübner, [1819]; Caerois arcesilae Hübner, [1819]

= Caerois chorinaeus =

Species of butterfly

Caerois chorinaeus is a butterfly of the family Nymphalidae. It was described by Johan Christian Fabricius in 1775. It is found in Suriname, the Guianas and Peru.

== Description ==
Caerois chorinaeus is a large butterfly with a very concave outer edge on its forewings, giving the apex a hooked shape, and pointed hindwings that form a tail. The upper side of the wings is dark brown, with the forewings barred by a yellow band from halfway along the costal margin to the outer angle, and the hindwings edged with a yellow marginal band. The reverse side is pearly brown.

== Subspecies ==
- Caerois chorinaeus chorinaeus (the Guianas)
- Caerois chorinaeus protonoe Fruhstorfer, 1912 (Peru)
- Caerois chorinaeus rufomarginata Lathy, 1918 (Peru)
