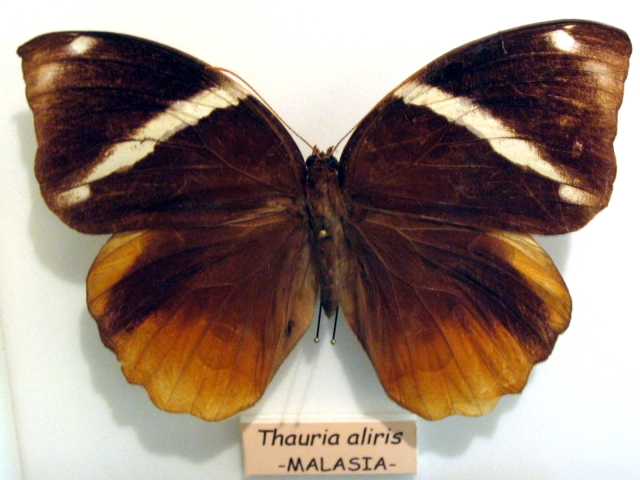

Scientific classification
- Domain: Eukaryota
- Kingdom: Animalia
- Phylum: Arthropoda
- Class: Insecta
- Order: Lepidoptera
- Family: Nymphalidae
- Tribe: Amathusiini
- Genus: Thauria; Moore, 1894

Species
- Thauria aliris; Thauria lathyi

Synonyms
- Morphindra Röber, 1903

= Thauria =

Genus of brush-footed butterflies

Thauria or the junglekings is a genus of butterflies in the family Nymphalidae. The genus ranges from Burma to Borneo. The butterflies are large and brightly coloured on the dorsal surface. There is a transverse white stripe on the forewing and one or two white apical spots. The hindwing has a broad yellow margin. The ventral wing surfaces are disruptively patterned and look like dead leaves, allowing the butterflies to blend into leaf litter on the forest floor. Cryptic ventral patterns have arisen multiple times in various forest-floor dwelling groups of Nymphalidae.

== Species ==
- Thauria aliris (Westwood, [1858])
- Thauria lathyi (Fruhstorfer, 1902)
