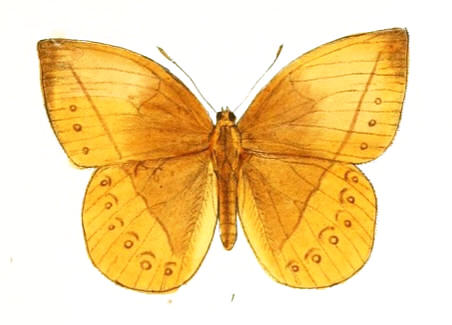

Scientific classification
- Domain: Eukaryota
- Kingdom: Animalia
- Phylum: Arthropoda
- Class: Insecta
- Order: Lepidoptera
- Family: Nymphalidae
- Genus: Aemona
- Species: A. pealii

Binomial name
- Aemona pealii Wood-Mason, 1880

Synonyms
- Aemona peali

= Aemona pealii =

Species of butterfly

Aemona pealii is a species of butterfly of the family Nymphalidae. It is found in Assam in India.

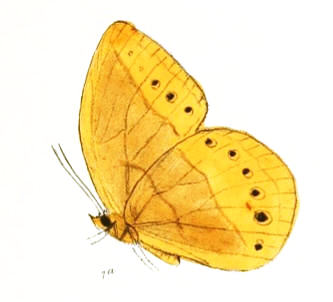
