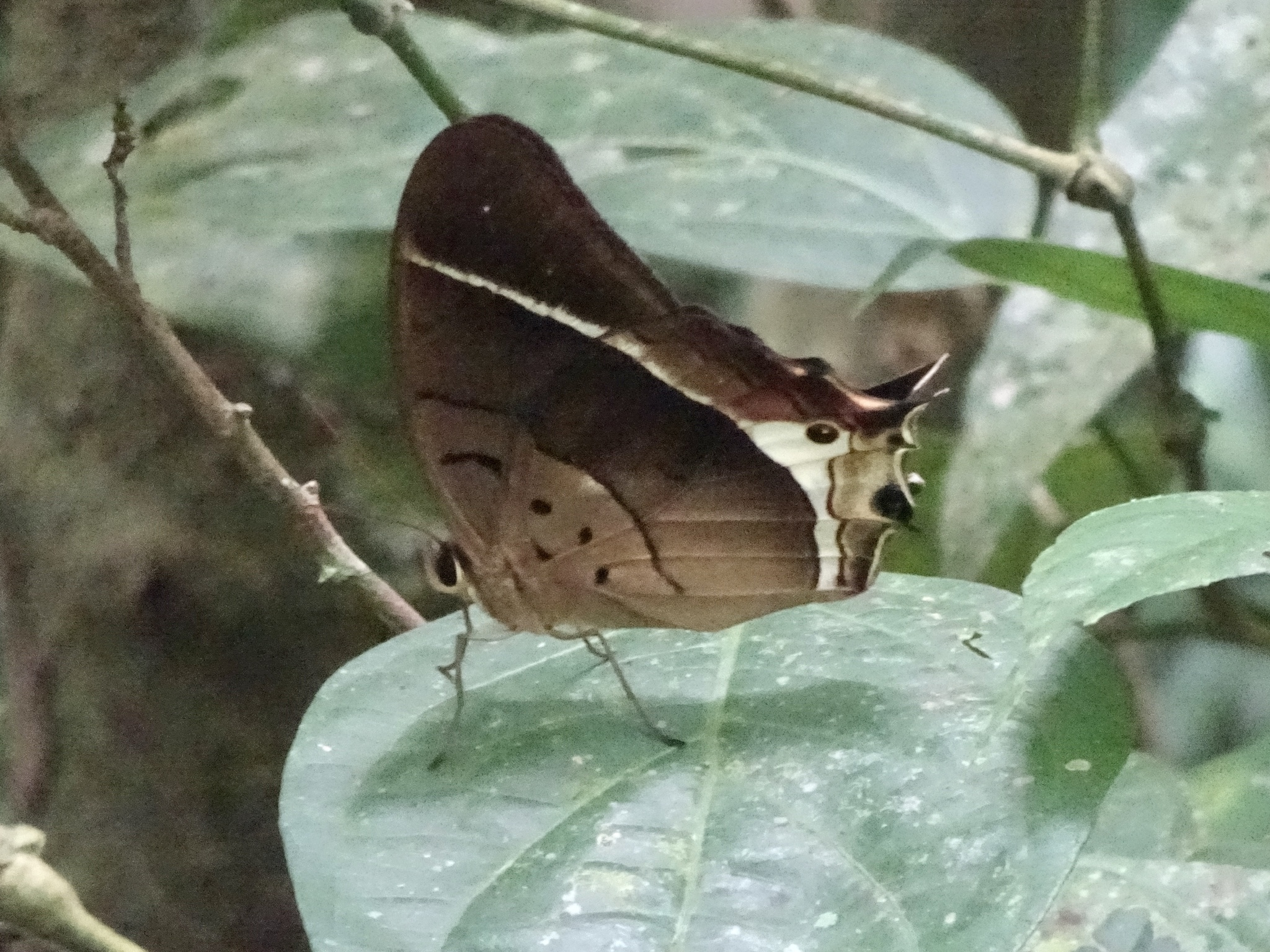
- A. philaretes ssp. lindigii observed in Panama

Scientific classification
- Domain: Eukaryota
- Kingdom: Animalia
- Phylum: Arthropoda
- Class: Insecta
- Order: Lepidoptera
- Family: Nymphalidae
- Genus: Antirrhea
- Species: A. philaretes

Binomial name
- Antirrhea philaretes C. Felder & R. Felder, 1862

= Antirrhea philaretes =

Species of butterfly

Antirrhea philaretes is a butterfly of the family Nymphalidae. It was first described by C. & R. Felder in 1862. It is found in Honduras, Nicaragua, Costa Rica, Panama, Colombia, Ecuador, Peru and Brazil.
