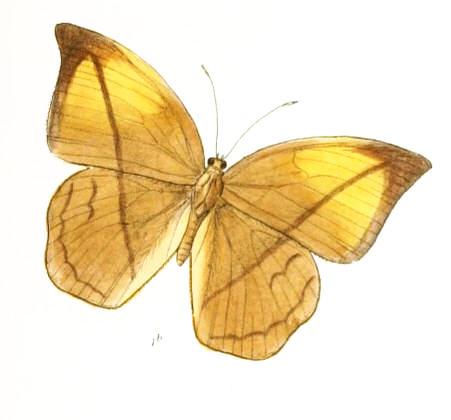

Scientific classification
- Domain: Eukaryota
- Kingdom: Animalia
- Phylum: Arthropoda
- Class: Insecta
- Order: Lepidoptera
- Family: Nymphalidae
- Tribe: Amathusiini
- Genus: Aemona; Hewitson, 1868

= Aemona (butterfly) =

Genus of brush-footed butterflies

Aemona is a genus of nymphalid butterflies from Southeast Asia, they are large yellow-brown butterflies resembling dead leaves. The wing apex is acute.

== Species ==
- Aemona amathusia (Hewitson, 1867)
- Aemona lena Atkinson, 1872
- Aemona peali Wood-Mason, 1880
