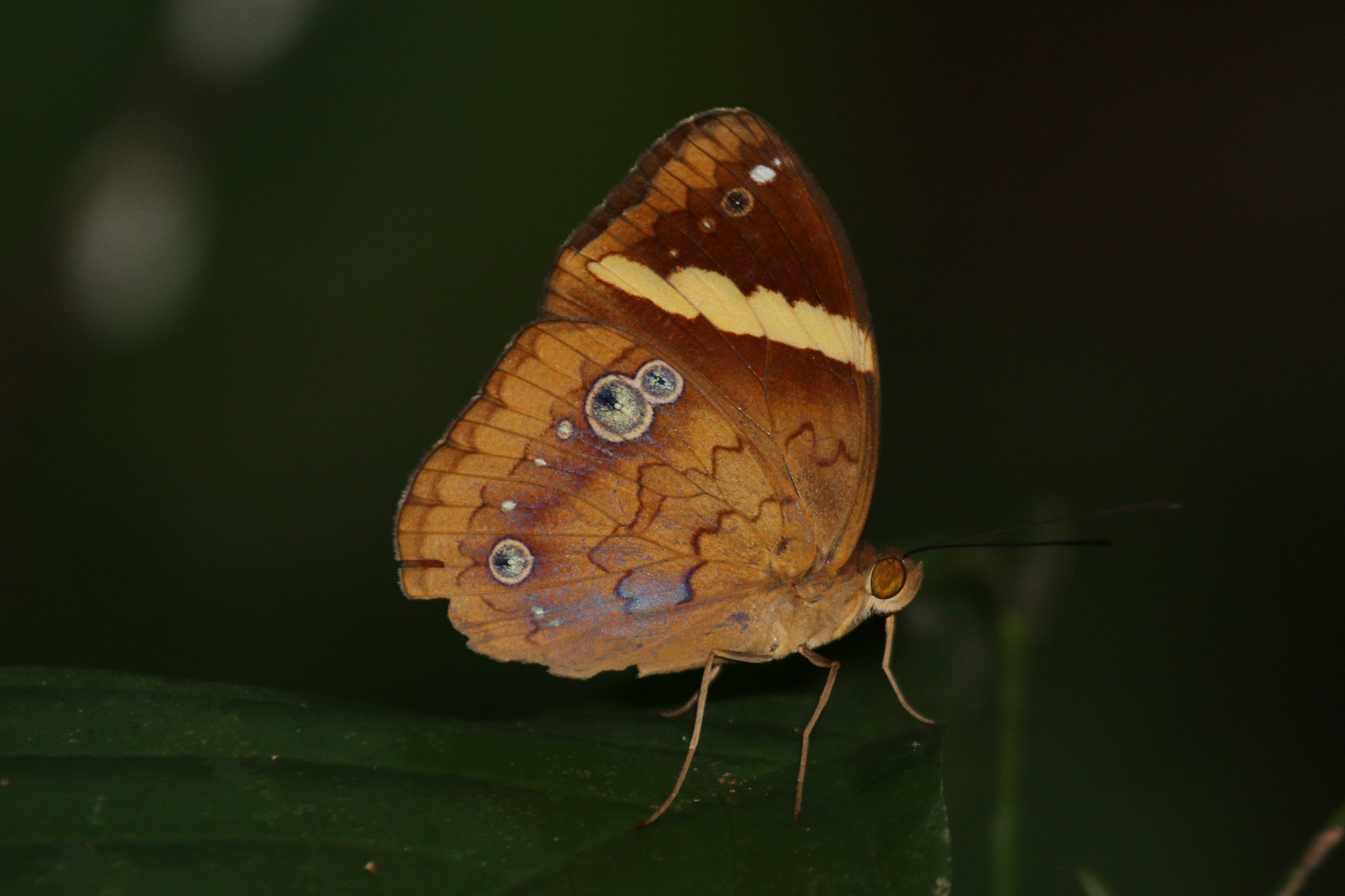
- Xanthotaenia busiris burra, Borneo, Malaysia

Scientific classification
- Kingdom: Animalia
- Phylum: Arthropoda
- Clade: Pancrustacea
- Class: Insecta
- Order: Lepidoptera
- Family: Nymphalidae
- Tribe: Amathusiini
- Genus: Xanthotaenia; Westwood, 1858
- Species: X. busiris

Binomial name
- Xanthotaenia busiris (Westwood, 1858)

Synonyms
- Clerome (Xanthotaenia) busiris Westwood, 1858; Xanthotaenia polychroma Hagen, 1898; Xanthotaenia obscura Butler, 1883

= Xanthotaenia =

Yellow-banded nymph

Monotypic brush-footed butterfly genus

Xanthotaenia is a monotypic butterfly genus in the family Nymphalidae. Its single species is Xanthotaenia busiris, the yellow-banded nymph. They can be identified by a yellow strip along their forewings.

== Behavior ==
The larvae feed on Calamus, while adults spend most of their lives at ground level usually near ginger, around Faunis canens butterflies. In Peninsular Malaysia, eggs were found and larvae were reared on ginger. It is semi-crepuscular in behavior.

== Distribution ==
The Xanthotaenia are primarily found around Myanmar, Thailand, Malaysia, Sumatra and Borneo, in tropical rainforests at elevations between 100–300 m.

== Subspecies ==
- Xanthotaenia busiris busiris (southern Burma: Teanasserim, Thailand, Peninsular Malaya, Sumatra)
- Xanthotaenia busiris burra Stichel, 1906 (Borneo, Natuna Islands)
- Xanthotaenia busiris obscura Butler, 1883 (Nias)
- Xanthotaenia busiris polychroma Hagen, 1898 (Mentawai)
