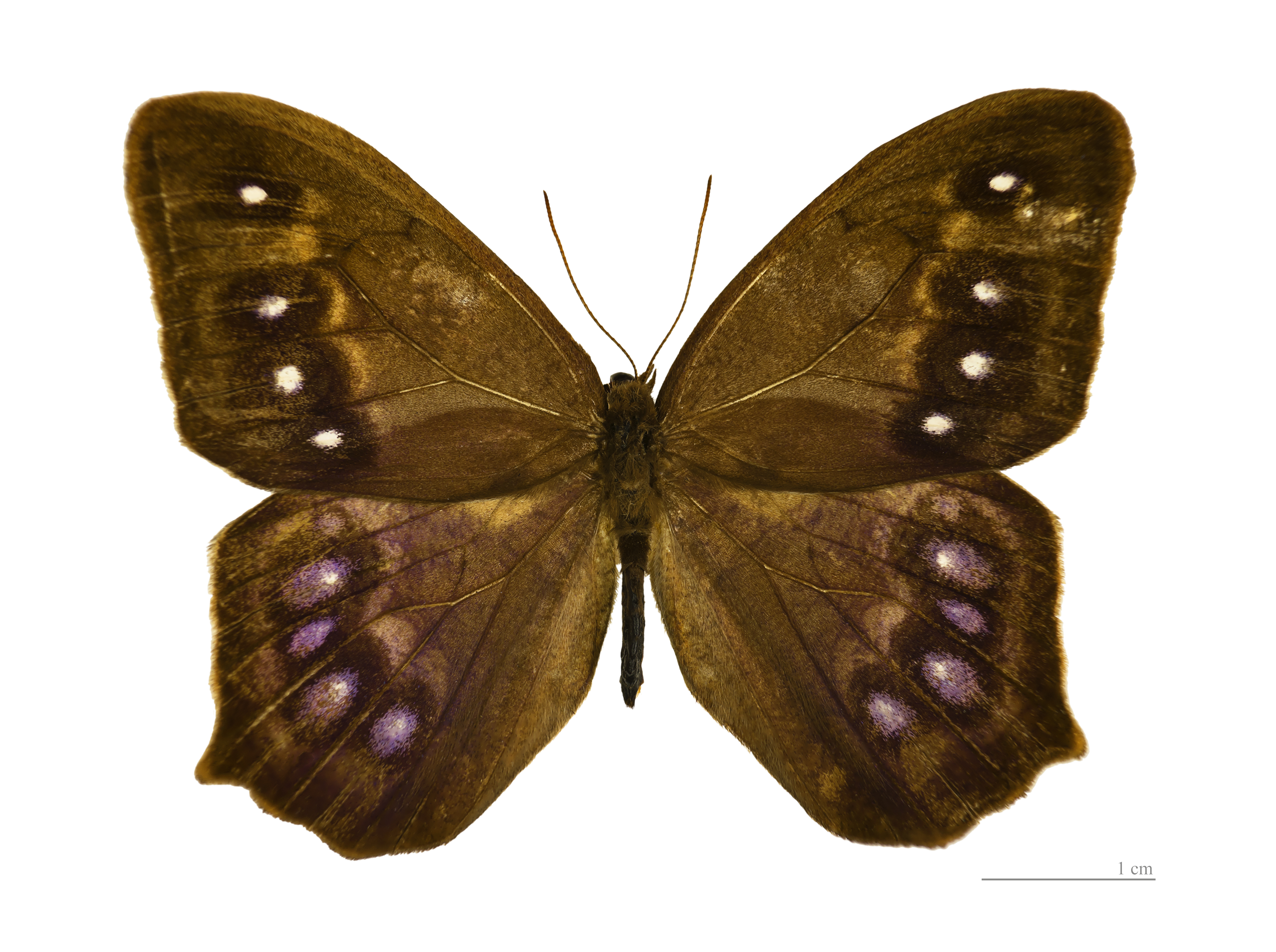
- Antirrhea ornata - MHNT

Scientific classification
- Domain: Eukaryota
- Kingdom: Animalia
- Phylum: Arthropoda
- Class: Insecta
- Order: Lepidoptera
- Family: Nymphalidae
- Subfamily: Morphinae
- Tribe: Morphini
- Genus: Antirrhea; Hübner, [1822]

Species
- See text

Synonyms
- Anchyphlebia Butler, 1868; Anchiphlebia Butler, 1868; Antirrhaea Boisduval, 1870; Sinarista Weymer, 1909; Triteleuta Strand, 1912

= Antirrhea =

Genus of brush-footed butterflies

Antirrhea is a Neotropical genus of butterflies from the family Nymphalidae.

== Species ==
The genus contains the following species, arranged alphabetically:

- Antirrhea adoptiva Weymer, 1909
- Antirrhea archaea Hübner, [1822]
- Antirrhea geryon C. & R. Felder, 1862
- Antirrhea geryonides Weymer, 1909
- Antirrhea hela C. & R. Felder, 1862
- Antirrhea kiefferi Plantrou, 1965
- Antirrhea miltiades (Fabricius, 1793)
- Antirrhea murena Staudinger, 1885
- Antirrhea ornata Butler, 1870
- Antirrhea phasiane Butler, 1870
- Antirrhea philaretes Felder, 1862
- Antirrhea philoctetes (Linnaeus, 1758)
- Antirrhea pterocopha Salvin & Godman, 1868
- Antirrhea taygetina Butler, 1868
- Antirrhea ulei Strand, 1912
- Antirrhea undulata Hering & Hopp, 1925
- Antirrhea watkinsi Rosenberg & Talbot, 1914
