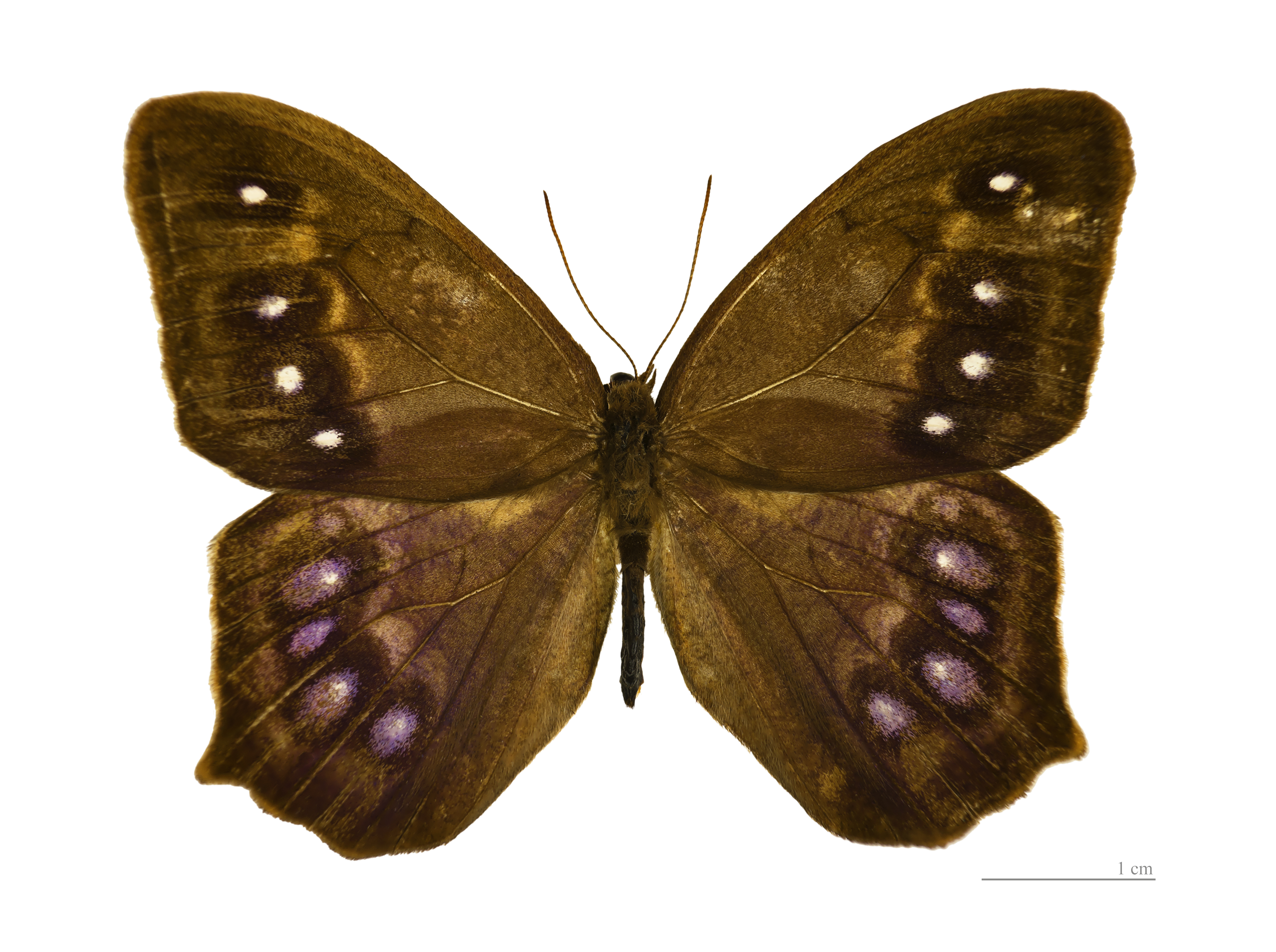
- Dorsal view
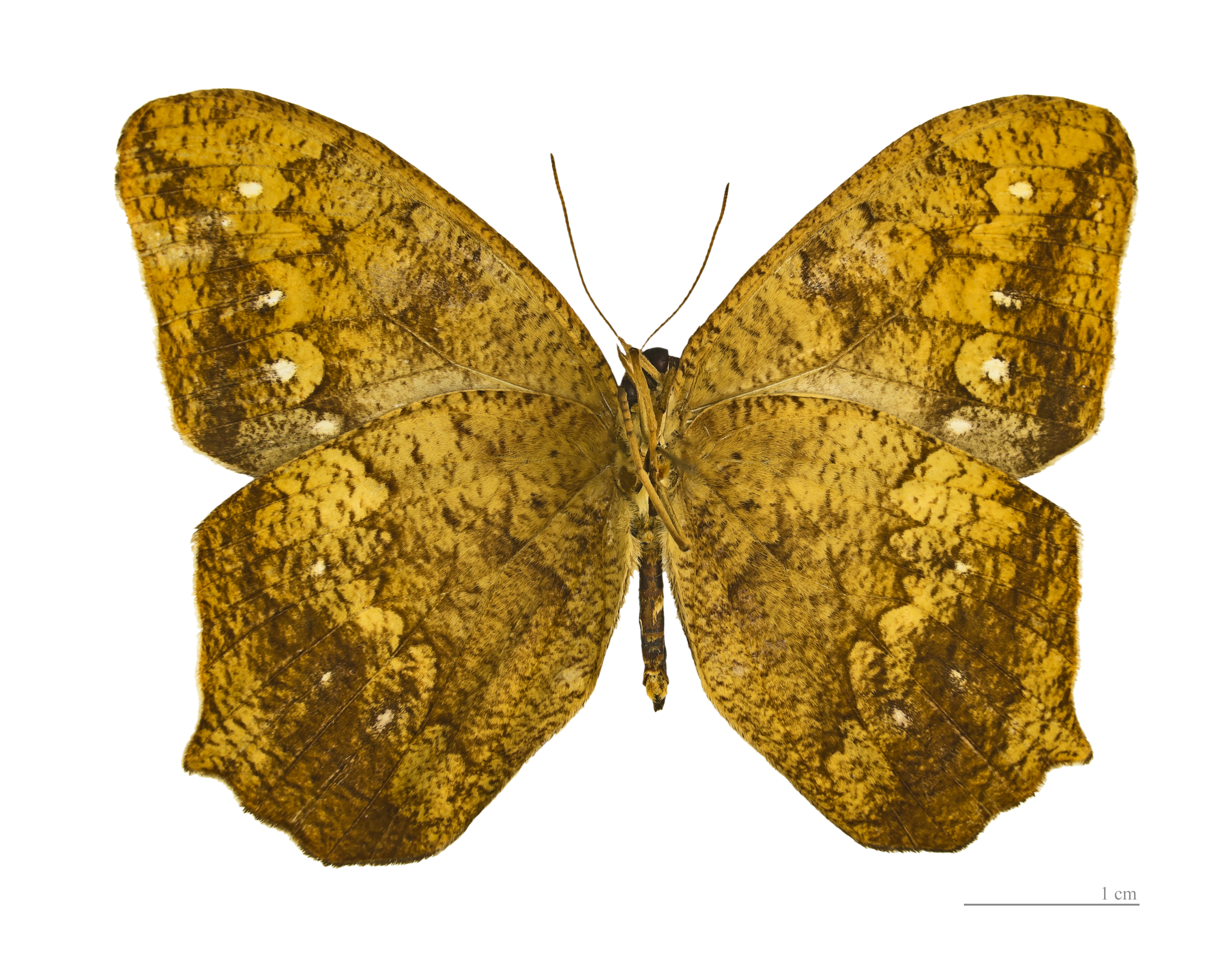
- Ventral view

Scientific classification
- Kingdom: Animalia
- Phylum: Arthropoda
- Class: Insecta
- Order: Lepidoptera
- Family: Nymphalidae
- Genus: Antirrhea
- Species: A. ornata

Binomial name
- Antirrhea ornata (Butler, 1870)

Synonyms
- Anchiphlebia ornata Butler, 1870

= Antirrhea ornata =

Species of butterfly

Antirrhea ornata is a butterfly of the family Nymphalidae. It was described by Arthur Gardiner Butler in 1870. Antirrhea ornata is a butterfly with forewings with a slightly concave outer edge and hindwings forming a point in n5. The upper surface is brown with a postdiscal band of blue spots broadly bordered in black.The reverse side is brown with a line of discreet little white spots.It is found in French Guiana.
