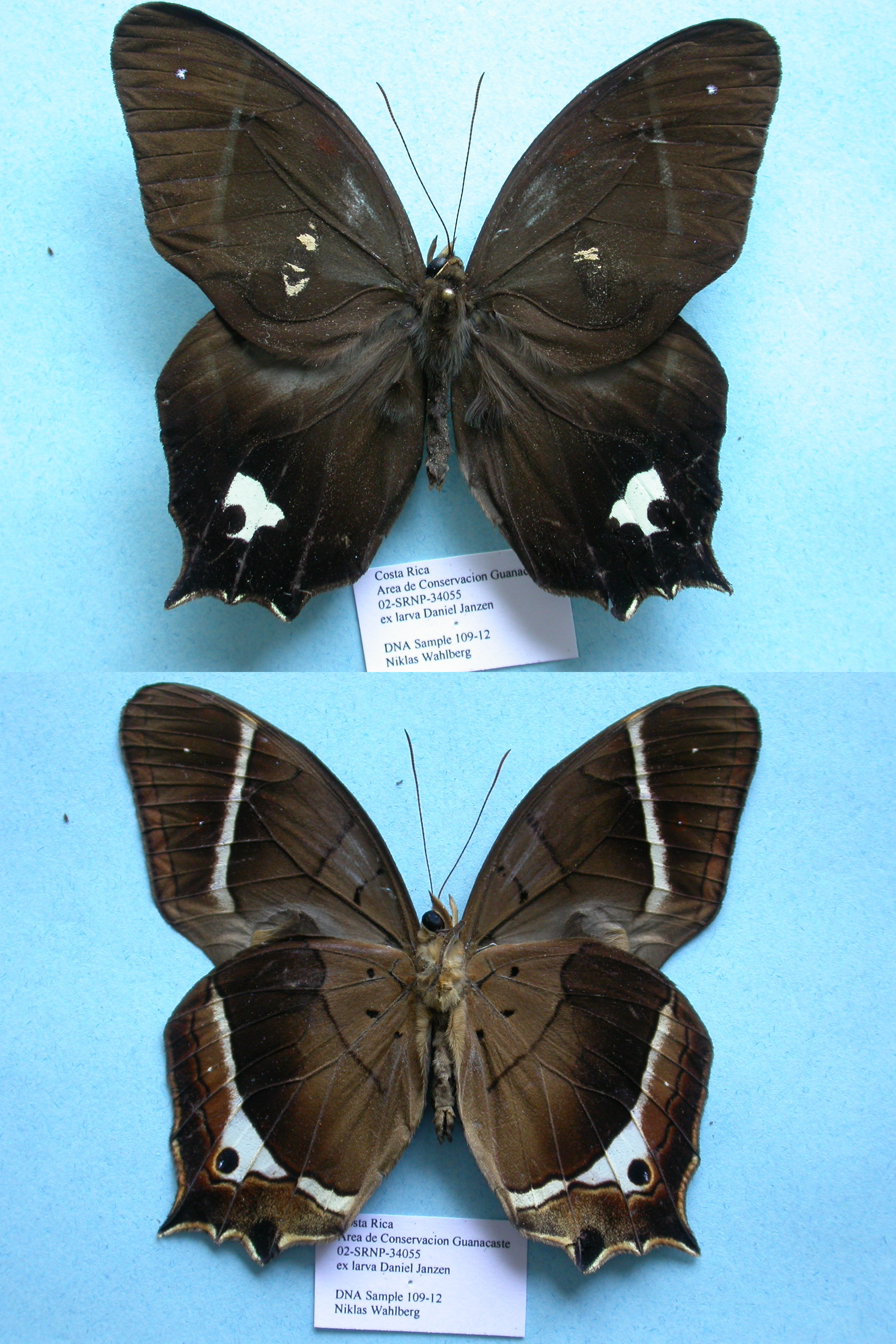

Scientific classification
- Kingdom: Animalia
- Phylum: Arthropoda
- Clade: Pancrustacea
- Class: Insecta
- Order: Lepidoptera
- Family: Nymphalidae
- Genus: Antirrhea
- Species: A. philoctetes

Binomial name
- Antirrhea philoctetes (Linnaeus, 1758)

Synonyms
- Papilio philoctetes Linnaeus, 1758; Papilio morna Fabricius, 1775; Antirrhaea scoparia Butler, 1870; Antirrhaea lindigii C. & R. Felder, 1862; Papilio miltiades Fabricius, 1793; Antirrhaea philaretes C. & R. Felder, 1862; Antirrhaea philopoemen C. & R. Felder, 1862; Antirrhaea casta Bates, 1865; Antirrhaea avernus Hopffer, 1874; Antirrhaea philaretes apoxyomenes Fruhstorfer, 1912; Antirrhaea tomasia Butler, 1875; Antirrhaea philoctetes murena Staudinger, [1886]; Antirrhaea militiades f. intermedia Zikán & Wygodzinsky, 1948; Antirrhaea philoctetes theodori Fruhstorfer, 1907; Triteleuta philoctetes ulei Strand, 1912; Antirrhea philaretes avernus f. interruptus Bryk, 1953

= Antirrhea philoctetes =

Species of butterfly

Antirrhea philoctetes, the common brown morpho, is a butterfly of the family Nymphalidae. It was described by Carl Linnaeus in 1758. It is found in Costa Rica, Panama, Guatemala, Colombia, Venezuela, the Guianas, Peru, Brazil and Bolivia. Antirrhea philoctetes is a large butterfly with a wingspan of approximately 95 mm to 105 mm. Its forewings have a concave outer margin, and its hindwings form three points at n3, n4, and n5 . The upperside is brown. The forewings are barred with white dots extending from the outer third of the costal margin to the inner margin. The hindwings are adorned with a postdiscal line of oval blue spots forming a band.The reverse is brown with a white line in the postdiscal area; it widens on the hindwing at n6 and contains a brown to black ocelli.

The larvae feed on Geonoma longivaginata.

In Adalbert Seitz

== Subspecies ==
- Antirrhea philoctetes philoctetes
- Antirrhea philoctetes avernus Hopffer, 1874 (Amazon, Guianas, Peru, Bolivia)
- Antirrhea philoctetes casta Bates, 1865 (Guatemala)
- Antirrhea philoctetes intermedia Salazar, Constantino & López, 1998 (Colombia, Peru)
- Antirrhea philoctetes lindigii C. & R. Felder, 1862 (Colombia)
- Antirrhea philoctetes murena Staudinger, [1886] (Brazil: Amazonas)
- Antirrhea philoctetes philaretes C. & R. Felder, 1862 (Colombia)
- Antirrhea philoctetes theodori Fruhstorfer, 1907 (Brazil: Amazonas)
- Antirrhea philoctetes tomasia Butler, 1875 (Costa Rica, Panama)
- Antirrhea philoctetes ulei Strand, 1912 (Venezuela)
