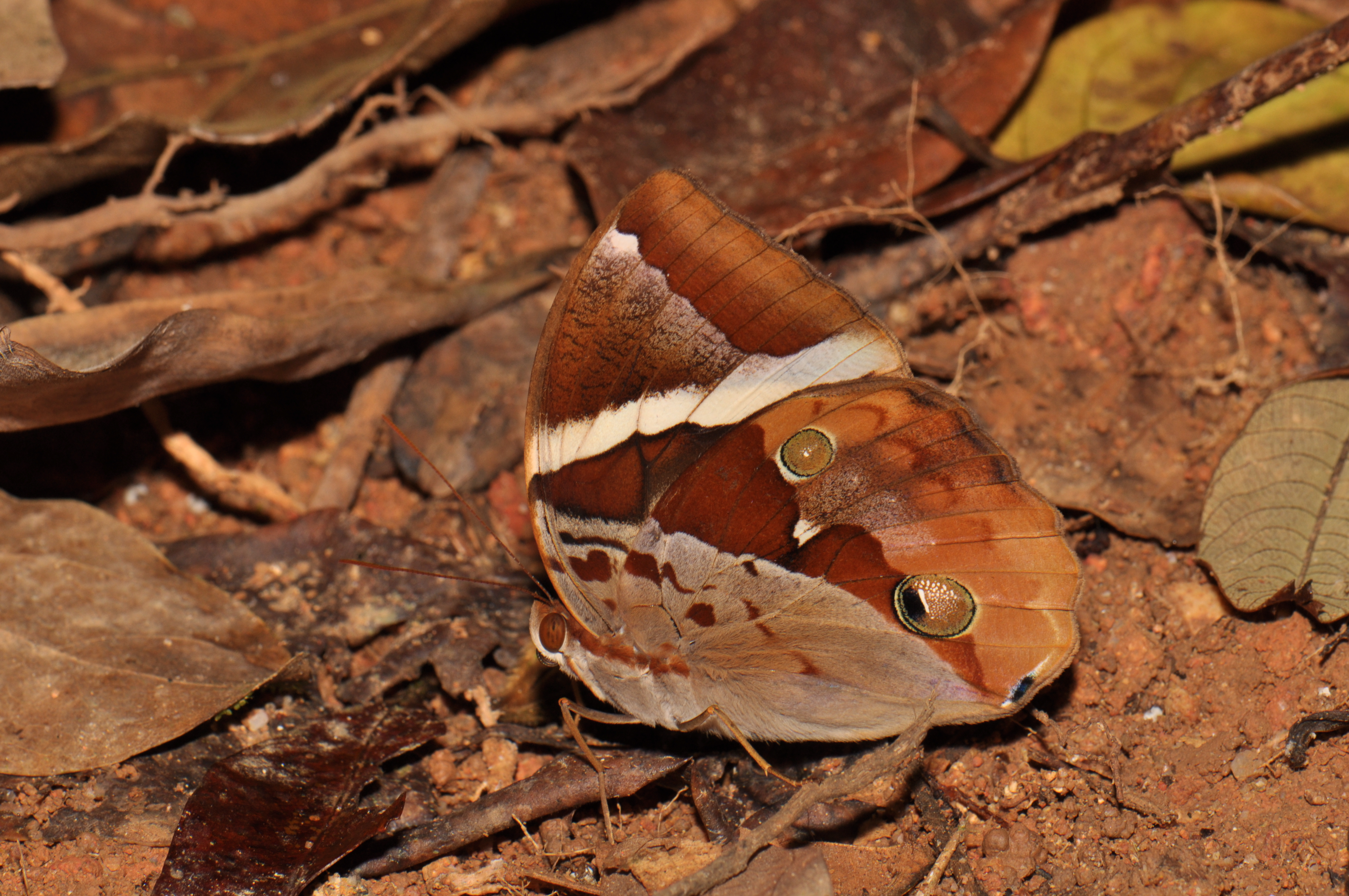

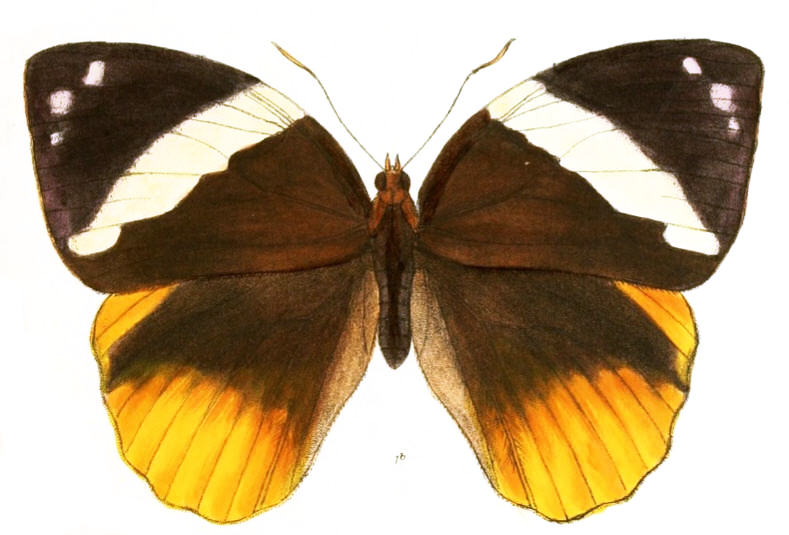

Scientific classification
- Kingdom: Animalia
- Phylum: Arthropoda
- Class: Insecta
- Order: Lepidoptera
- Family: Nymphalidae
- Genus: Thauria
- Species: T. aliris

Binomial name
- Thauria aliris (Westwood, 1858)

Subspecies
- T. a. aliris; T. a. pseudaliris; T. a. intermedia; T. a. siamensis; T. a. amplifascia; T. a. merguia

Synonyms
- Thaumantis aliris Westwood, 1858; Thaumantis pseudaliris Butler, 1877; Thauria pseudaliris Butler, 1877

= Thauria aliris =

Tufted jungleking

Species of butterfly

Thauria aliris, the tufted jungleking, is a butterfly found in South East Asia that belongs to the Morphinae subfamily of the brush-footed butterflies family.

== Distribution ==
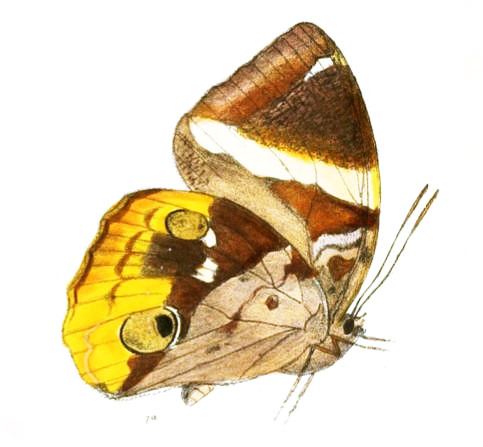

The tufted jungleking ranges among Myanmar, Malaysia, Borneo and Tonkin.

== Status ==
In 1932, William Harry Evans reported the butterfly as very rare in northern Myanmar.

== See also ==
- List of butterflies of India
- List of butterflies of India (Morphinae)
- List of butterflies of India (Nymphalidae)
