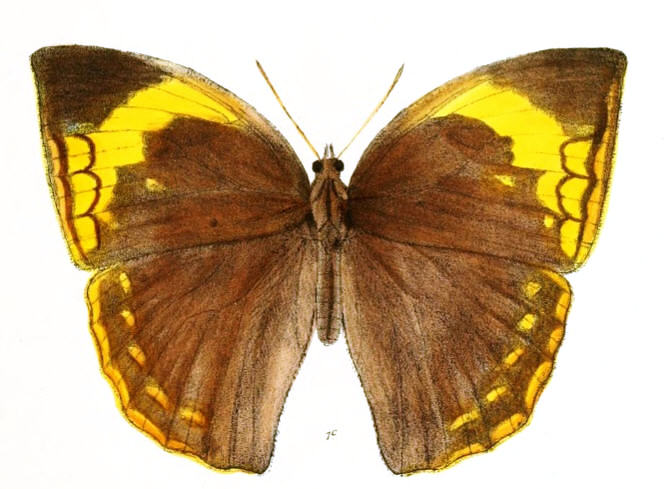

Scientific classification
- Kingdom: Animalia
- Phylum: Arthropoda
- Class: Insecta
- Order: Lepidoptera
- Family: Nymphalidae
- Genus: Discophora
- Species: D. timora

Binomial name
- Discophora timora Westwood, 1850

= Discophora timora =

Great duffer

Species of butterfly

Discophora timora, the great duffer, is a butterfly found in South Asia that belongs to the Morphinae subfamily of the brush-footed butterflies family.

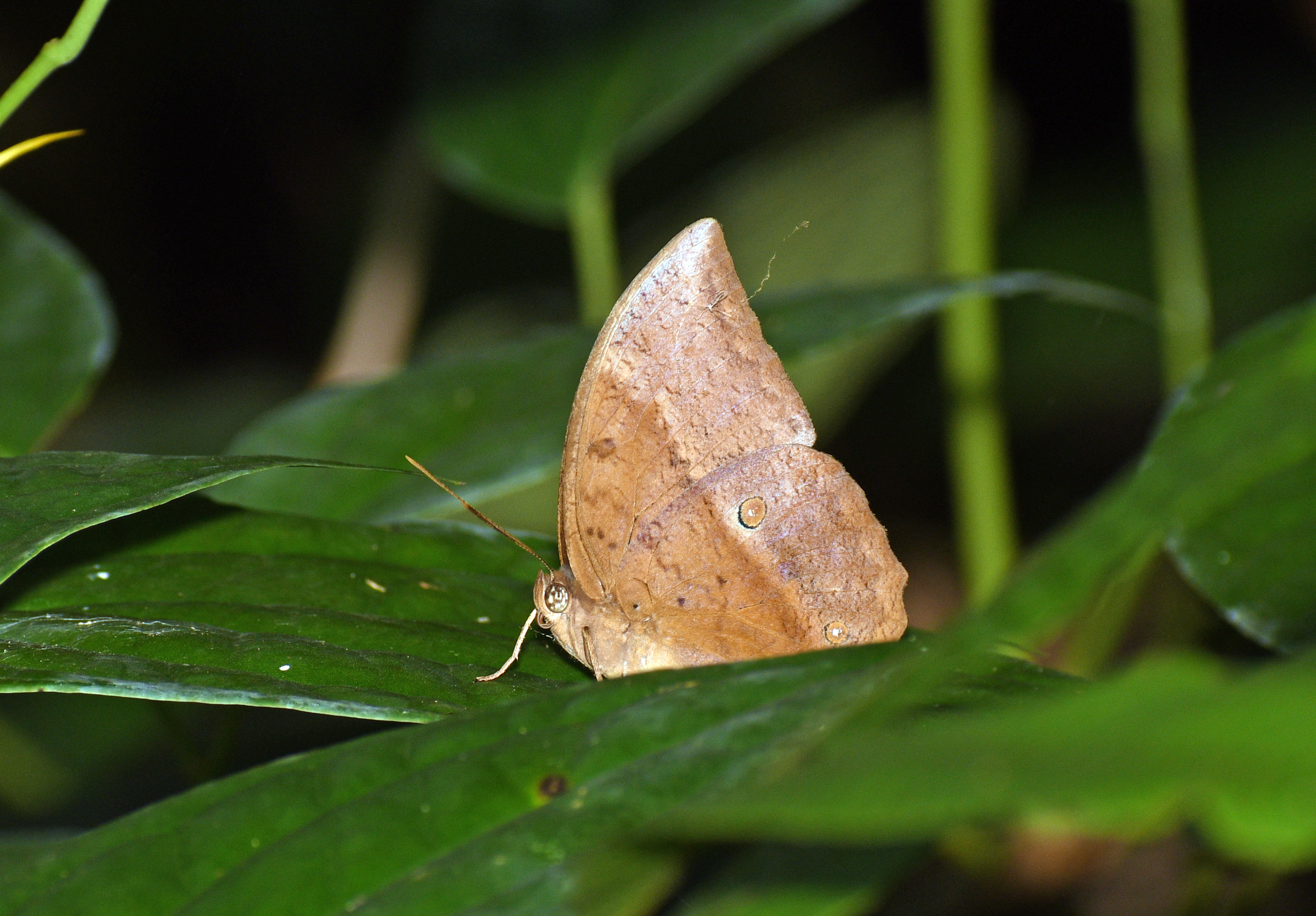

== Distribution ==
The great duffer ranges from Sikkim and Assam in India to Myanmar, Thailand, peninsular Malaysia, Singapore and Indochina.

A subspecies of the butterfly is found as a rare endemic in the Andaman Islands. It was recorded as Discophora continentalis andamanensis, Staudinger by William Harry Evans.

== See also ==
- List of butterflies of India
- List of butterflies of India (Morphinae)
- List of butterflies of India (Nymphalidae)
