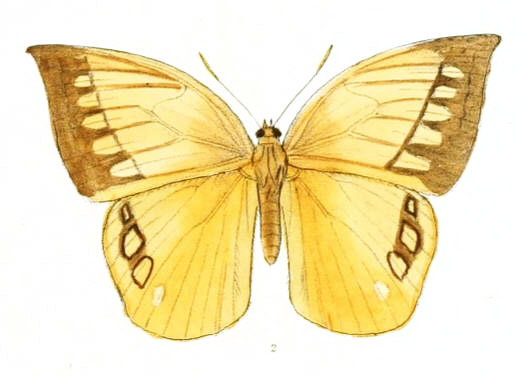

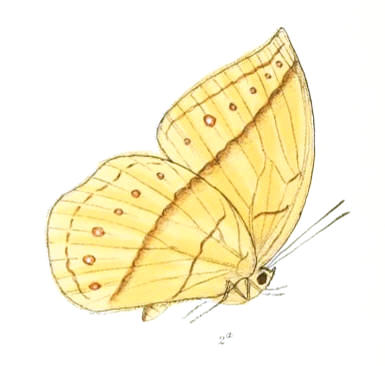

Scientific classification
- Kingdom: Animalia
- Phylum: Arthropoda
- Class: Insecta
- Order: Lepidoptera
- Family: Nymphalidae
- Genus: Aemona
- Species: A. lena

Binomial name
- Aemona lena Atkinson, 1872

= Aemona lena =

White dryad

Species of butterfly

Aemona lena, the white dryad, is a butterfly found in Asia that belongs to the Morphinae subfamily of the brush-footed butterflies family.

== Description ==
1. AEMONA LENA, sp. nov. (Plate XII. fig. 1.) Upperside :—Fore wings pale brownish grey, crossed by a dark brown band, interrupted by the nervures from before the apex to near the posterior margin at two-thirds of its length from the base, beyond the band darker, with a slightly marked and incomplete submarginal line, before which is a series of five pale lanceolate blotches between the nervures directed towards the outer margin. All the nervures tinged with yellow and more or less dark-bordered. Hind wings: anterior portion from base to outer margin pale, posterior portion bright yellow, crossed by a submarginal series of three dark bordered white blotches, and a fourth fainter blotch between the neryures, forming a short interrupted band from near the apex to the second median nervure. The submedian nervure fringed from its origin to near its extremity with long yellowish hairs, longest and most conspicuous towards its extremity.

Underside :—Both wings crossed by a dark ferruginous band with sharply defined outer edge from the costa of the fore wing near the apex to near the extremity of the submedian nervure of the hind wing, and having a faintly traced submarginal line, before which is a series of blind white-centred ocelli. The cell of the fore wing crossed near its middle by a curved ferruginous band. Hind wing crossed by a ferruginous band near the base.

Antenne ferruginous; palpi and legs tawny yellow.

Expanse of wings 3 and 1/4 inches.

Hab. Yunan. Collected by Dr. J. Anderson, 1868.

== Distribution ==
In South East Asia the white dryad ranges from Myanmar (Karen Hills, the Shan Hills and around Maymyo) to Yunnan (south west China).

== Status ==
In 1932, William Harry Evans wrote that the subspecies Aemona lena haynei, Tytler is not rare in the Shan States. The nominate subspecies, Aemona lena lena, Atkinson is rare in the Karen Hills.

== See also ==
- List of butterflies of India (Morphinae)
- List of butterflies of India (Nymphalidae)
