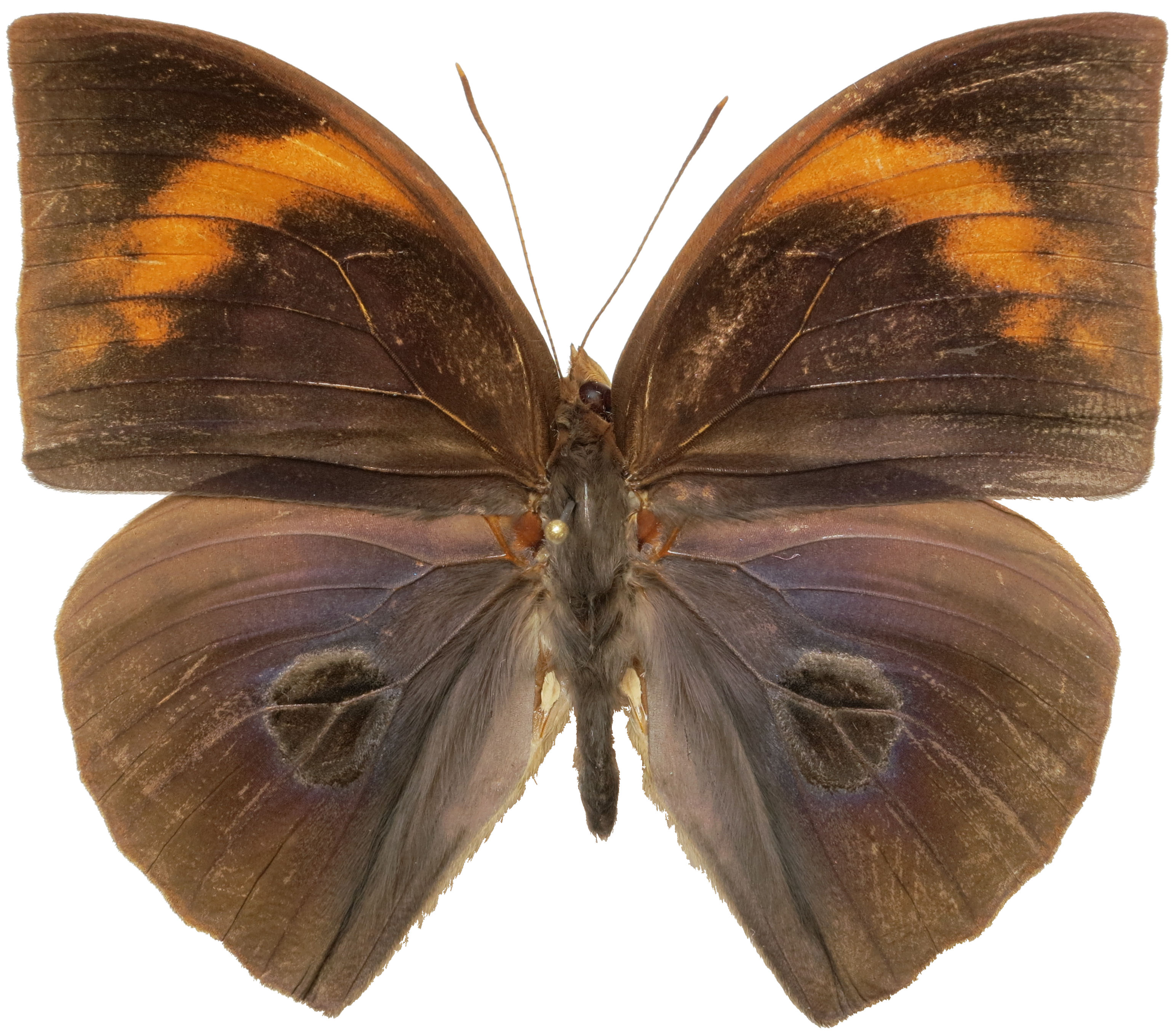
- Discophora deo fruhstorferi from Vietnam

Scientific classification
- Kingdom: Animalia
- Phylum: Arthropoda
- Class: Insecta
- Order: Lepidoptera
- Family: Nymphalidae
- Genus: Discophora
- Species: D. deo

Binomial name
- Discophora deo de Nicéville, 1898

= Discophora deo =

Banded duffer

Species of butterfly

Discophora deo, the banded duffer, is a butterfly found in Asia that belongs to the Morphinae subfamily of the brush-footed butterflies family.

== Distribution ==
The banded duffer ranges from Manipur in India across to the northern part of Myanmar, the Shan States, northern Thailand to northern Vietnam.

== Status ==
In 1932, William Harry Evans reported that the butterfly was very rare in its South Asian range.

== See also ==
- List of butterflies of India
- List of butterflies of India (Morphinae)
- List of butterflies of India (Nymphalidae)
