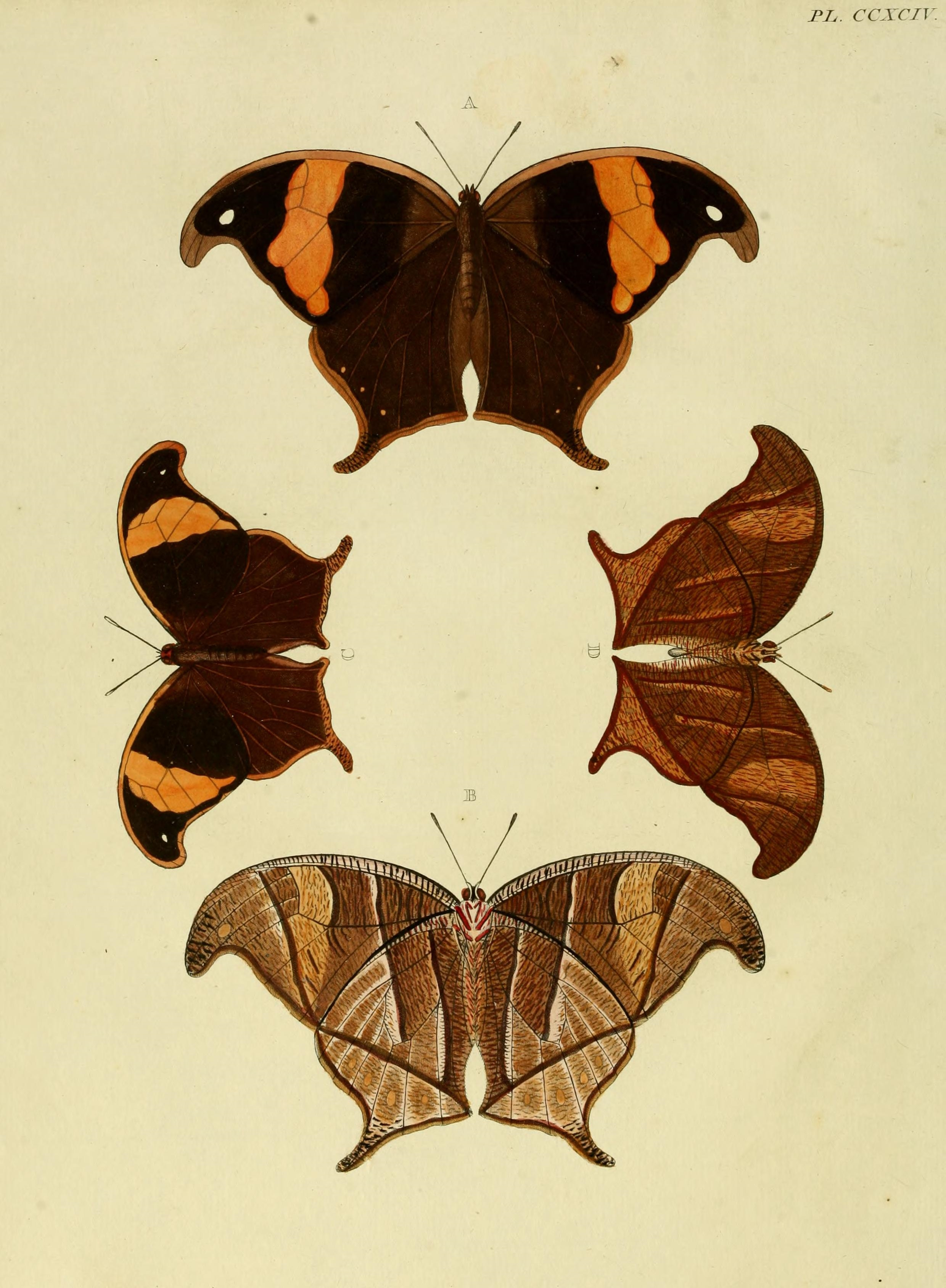
- Caerois chorinaeus

Scientific classification
- Kingdom: Animalia
- Phylum: Arthropoda
- Clade: Pancrustacea
- Class: Insecta
- Order: Lepidoptera
- Family: Nymphalidae
- Tribe: Morphini
- Genus: Caerois; Hübner, [1819]

Species
- See text

Synonyms
- Arpidea Duncan, 1837; Hames Westwood, [1851]; Caerous Herrich-Schäffer, 1865

= Caerois =

Genus of brush-footed butterflies

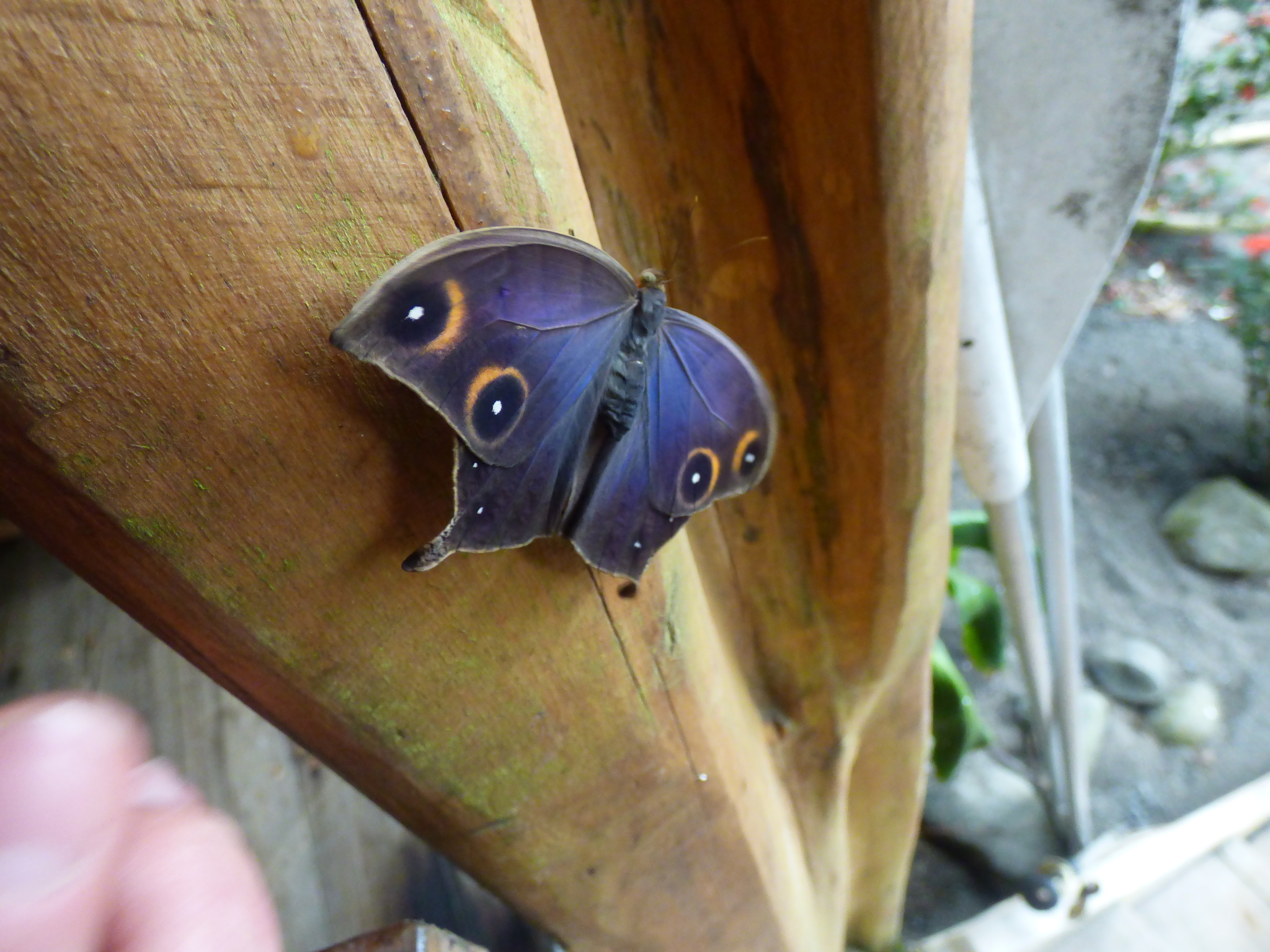
False Antirrhea (Caerois gerdrudtus)

Caerois is a Neotropical genus of butterflies from the family Nymphalidae.

== Species ==
Arranged alphabetically:

- Caerois chorinaeus (Fabricius, 1775)
- Caerois gerdrudtus (Fabricius, 1793)
