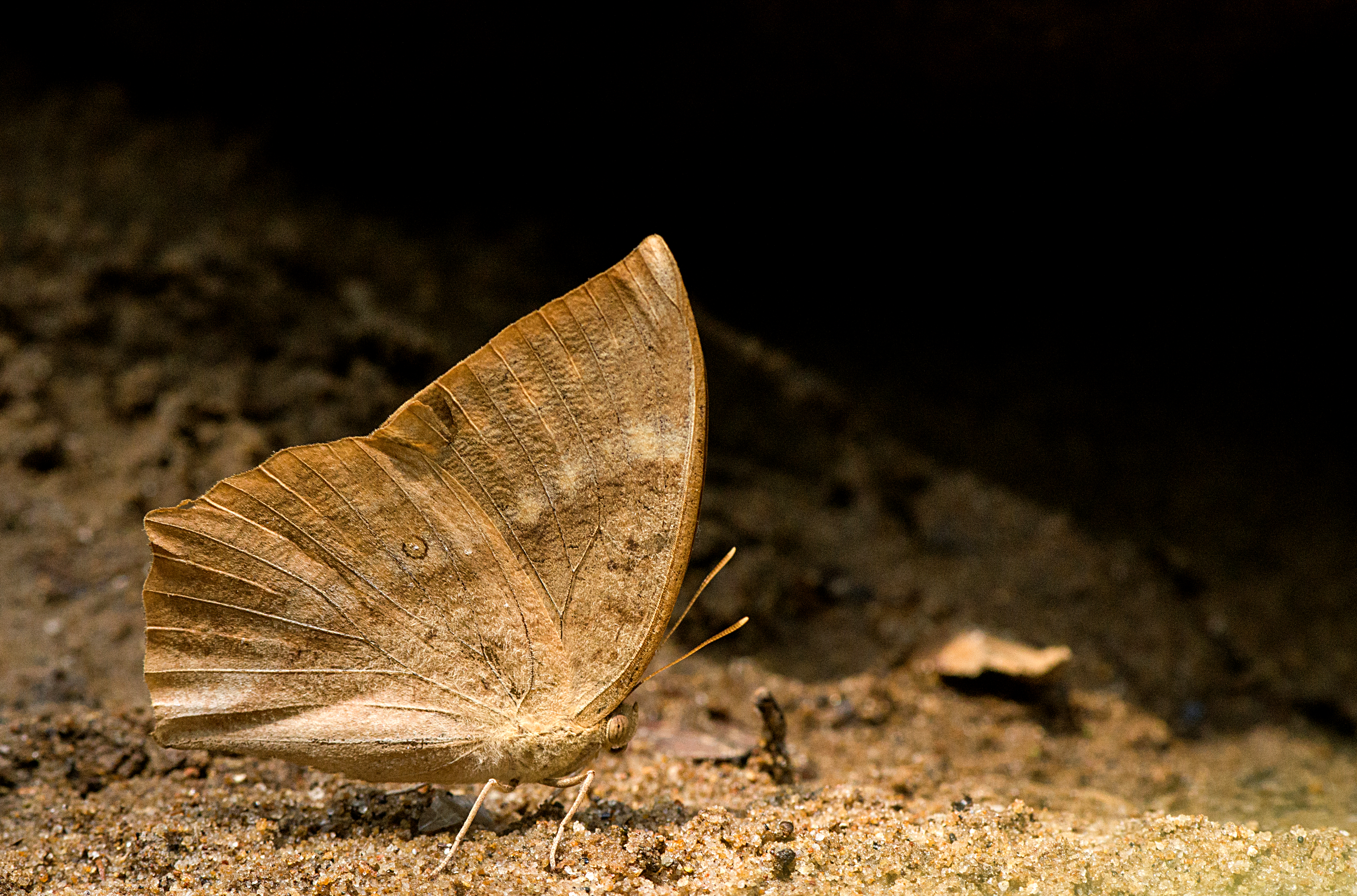

Scientific classification
- Kingdom: Animalia
- Phylum: Arthropoda
- Class: Insecta
- Order: Lepidoptera
- Family: Nymphalidae
- Genus: Discophora
- Species: D. sondaica

Binomial name
- Discophora sondaica Boisduval, 1836

= Discophora sondaica =

Common duffer

Species of butterfly

Discophora sondaica, the common duffer, is a species of nymphalid butterfly found in Southeast Asia.

== Description ==
Upperside of male dark brown. Forewing with transverse discal, postdiscal and subterminal series of bluish spots, the latter two series closely approximate. Hindwing uniform except for the prominence of the discal secondary sex-mark, and faint indications of a subterminal series of pale spots. Underside a dull ochraceous brown, the basal half of the wing is darker, defined outwardly by a still darker but obscure transverse band ending in a lilacine diffuse small patch at the tornus of the hindwing; both forewing and hindwing irrorated somewhat sparsely with short transverse brown striae and obscurely tinted with lilac; two ill-defined ocelli on the hindwing as in Discophora celinde. Antennae ochraceous; head, thorax and abdomen brown, paler beneath.

Female has an upperside of purplish brown. Forewing with three transverse series of white spots, the inner or discal series continued to the costa by two large elongate obliquely-placed white spots. Hindwing also with three transverse rows of somewhat obscure spots, but ochraceous in colour. Underside similar to that in the male, but paler.

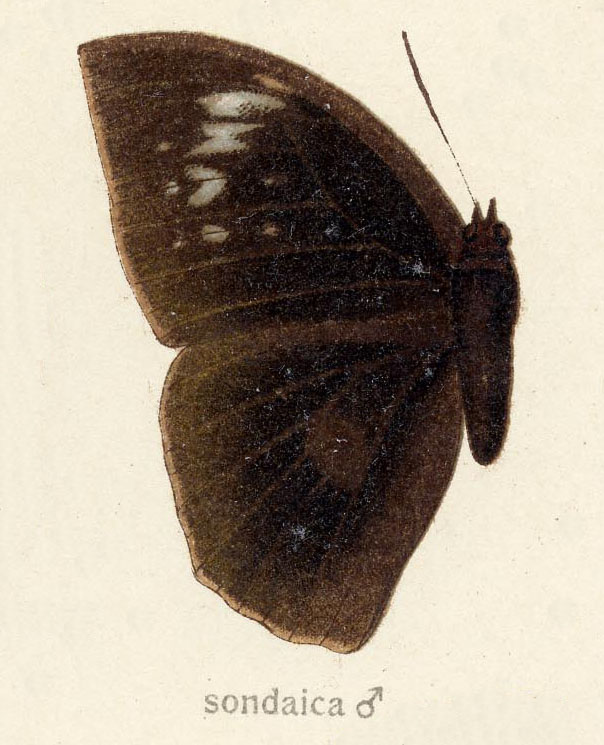
Discophora sondiaca male

== Life history ==
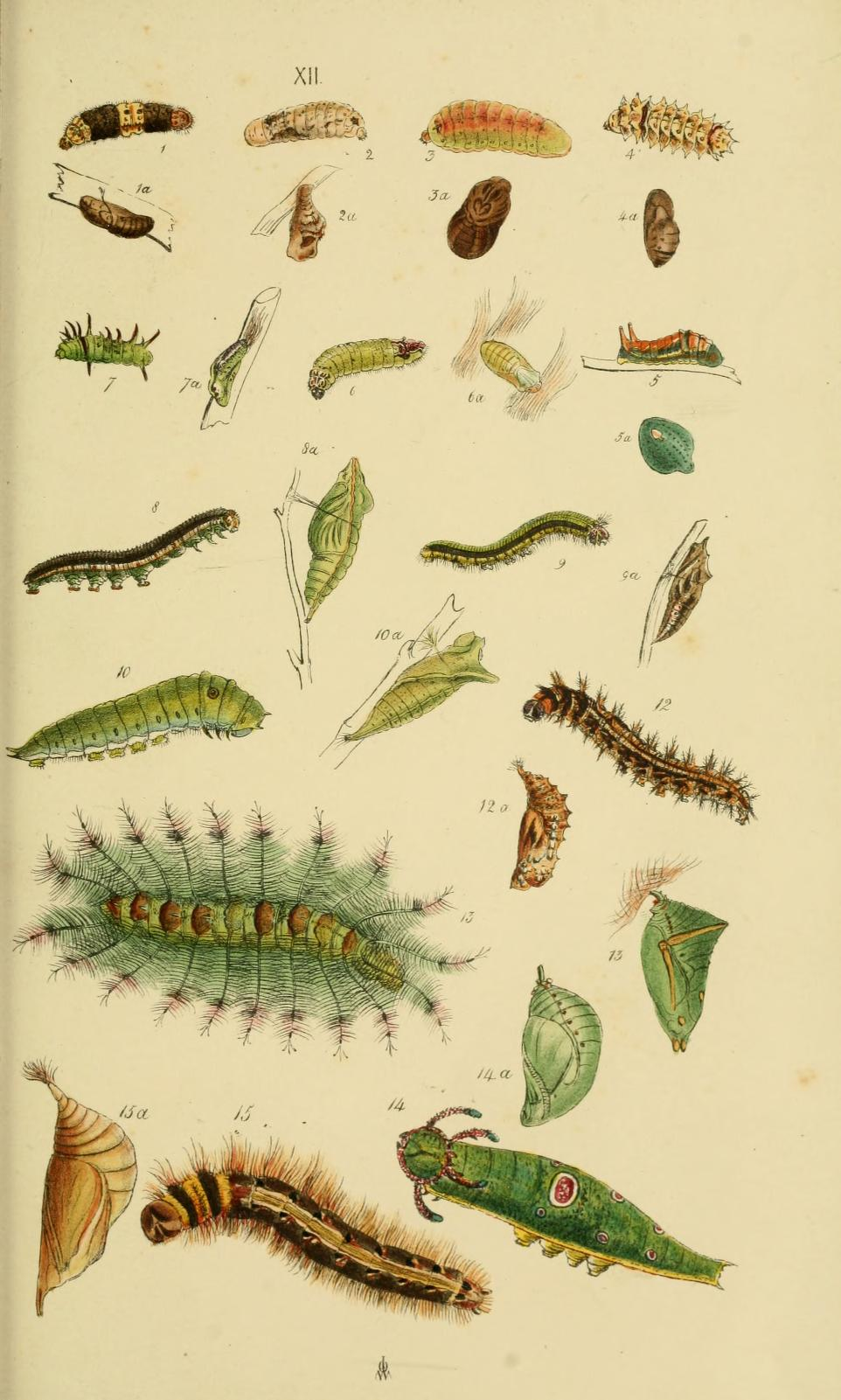
Figures 15 larva, 15a pupa

=== Larva ===
"On bamboo, living during the day in three or four leaves spun together .... full-fed larva 2 inches long, colour black mottled with grey; a rather broad yellowish dorsal line; the junction of the segments marked by a thin irregular yellow line and red spot; body covered with white hairs; head and anus black, the former marked with perpendicular yellow lines." (Manders, Transactions of the Entomological Society of London 1890, p. 519.)

=== Pupa ===
".. white, suspended by the tail; the labial palpi prominently projected; changing to dark brown a few hours before emergence. The perfect insect remains three weeks in pupa." (Manders, Transactions of the Entomological Society of London 1890, p. 519.)
