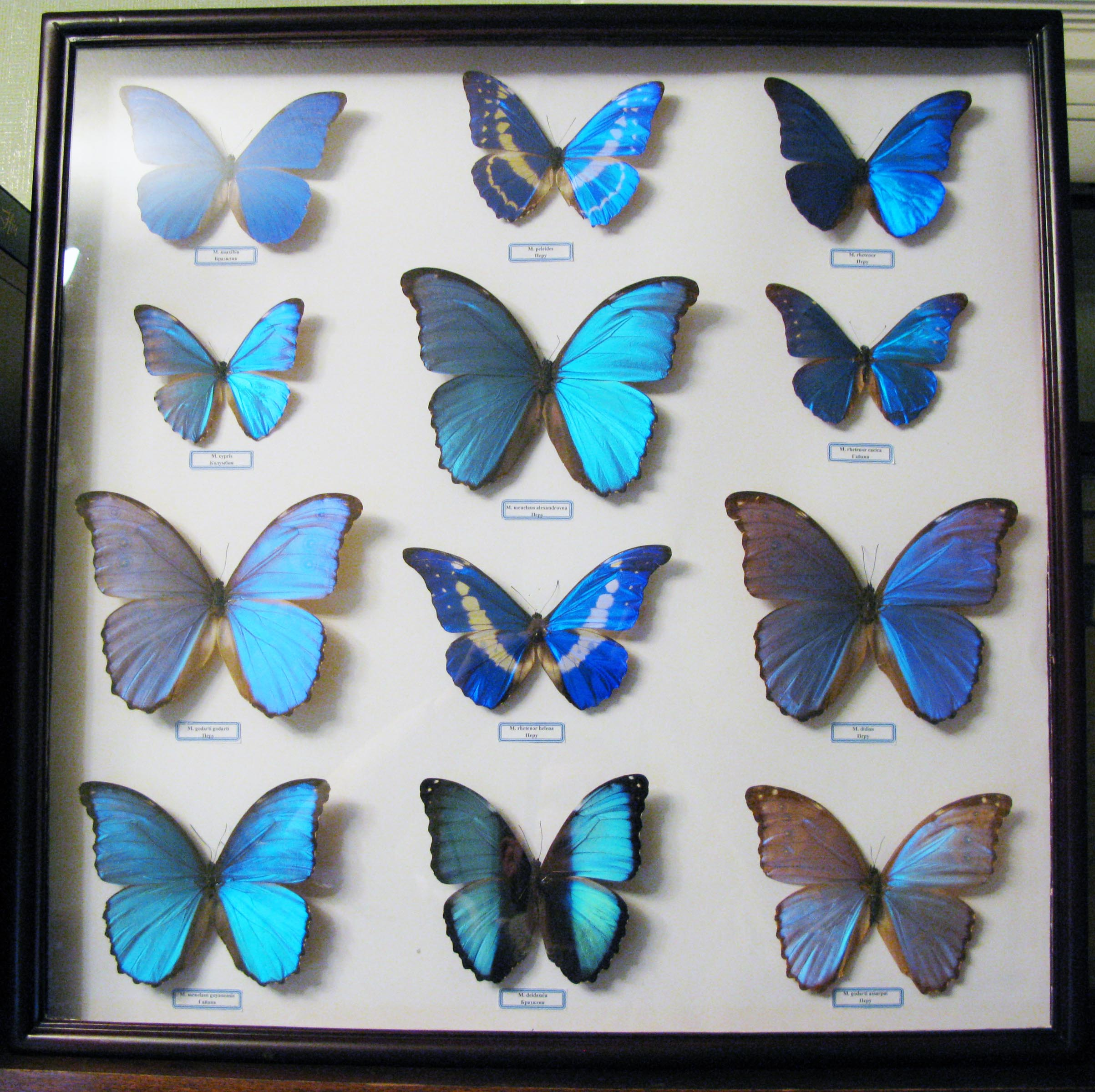

Scientific classification
- Domain: Eukaryota
- Kingdom: Animalia
- Phylum: Arthropoda
- Class: Insecta
- Order: Lepidoptera
- Family: Nymphalidae
- Subfamily: Morphinae

Tribes
- Amathusiini; Brassolini; Morphini; (but see text)

= Morphinae =

Subfamily of butterfly family Nymphalidae

The Morphinae are a subfamily of Nymphalidae butterflies that includes the morphos, the owl butterflies (Caligo), and related lineages. It is either considered a sister group of the Satyrinae, or disassembled and included therein.

== Systematics ==
This group sometimes includes the monotypic (sub)tribe Biina, otherwise placed in the Brassolini. This group is the subject of intense study and the following classification is subject to modification.

Listed alphabetically by tribe.

Tribe Amathusiini (sometimes considered a distinct subfamily Amathusiinae):

- 15 genera, see tribe article

Tribe Brassolini (previously considered a distinct subfamily Brassolinae):

- 18-19 genera, see tribe article

Tribe Morphini:

- Antirrhea
- Caerois
- Morpho
