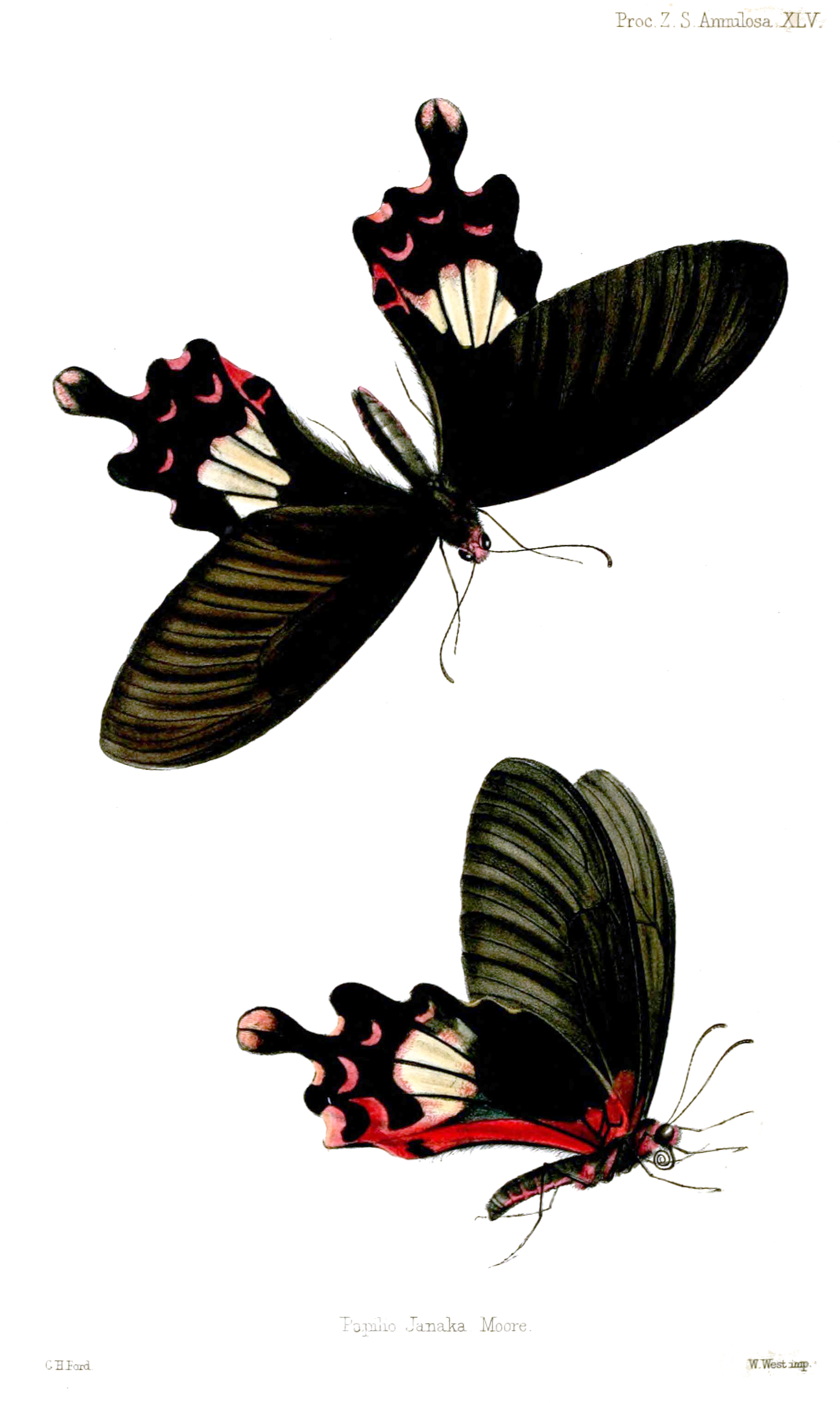

Scientific classification
- Kingdom: Animalia
- Phylum: Arthropoda
- Clade: Pancrustacea
- Class: Insecta
- Order: Lepidoptera
- Family: Papilionidae
- Genus: Papilio
- Species: P. janaka

Binomial name
- Papilio janaka Moore & Horsfield, 1857

= Papilio janaka =

Tailed redbreast

Species of butterfly

Papilio janaka, the tailed redbreast, is a well-marked swallowtail butterfly found in India. The species was first described by Frederic Moore and Thomas Horsfield in 1857.

== Description ==
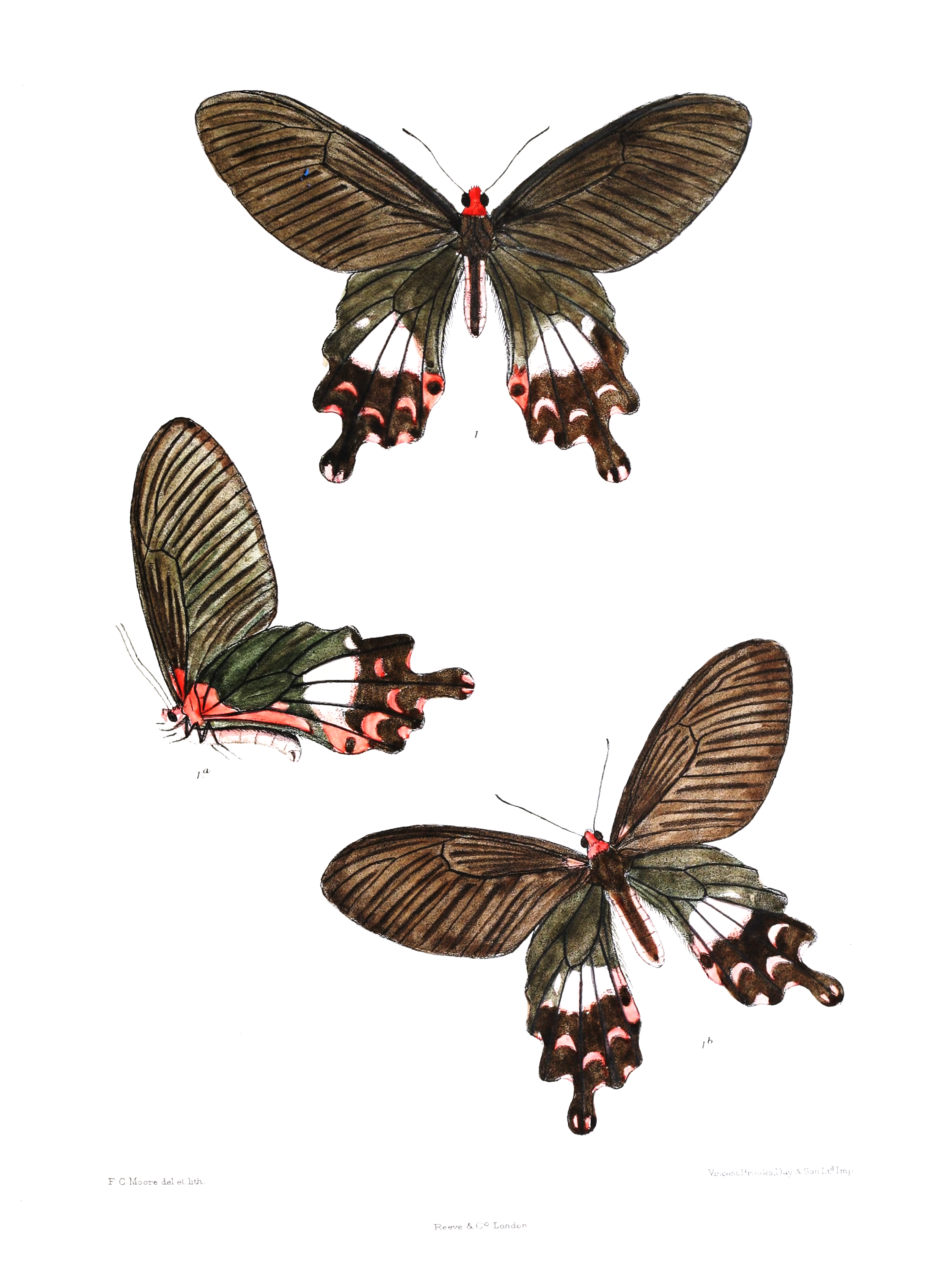

The tailed redbreast closely resembles Papilio bootes but differs as follows:

- Male upperside; ground colour a duller more greyish black, the outer half of the hindwing darker; the elongate discal white series of spots extended into interspace 2, sometimes also into interspace 5; beyond these the dark red markings are as in P. bootes, but there is in addition a postdiscal series of red lunules, that at the tornal angle coalesces with the admarginal spot.
- Underside; similar to that of P. bootes, but with the additional white spots as on the upperside, these however in many specimens are much irrorated with red scales; the red at the base of the wings are more extended than in P. bootes and continue along the dorsal margin of the hindwing in a long streak.
- Female; similar to the male, but the ground colour on the upperside paler, a spot of red at the base of the forewing; the postdiscal markings on the hindwing white, only tinged with red. Underside is similar to the upperside; the red at the base of the wings continues along the dorsal margin as in the male.

== Status ==
The species is not known to be threatened.
