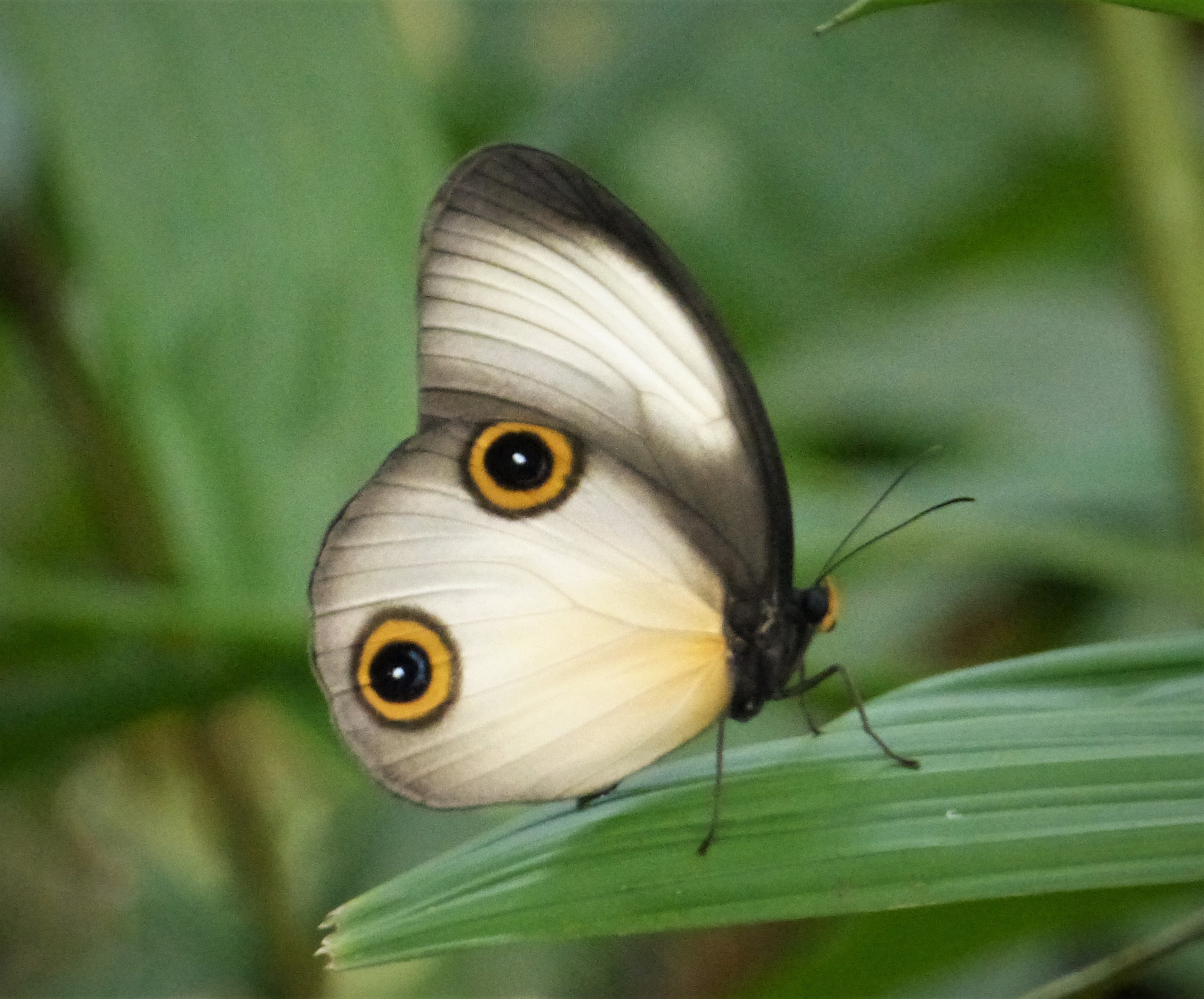

Scientific classification
- Domain: Eukaryota
- Kingdom: Animalia
- Phylum: Arthropoda
- Class: Insecta
- Order: Lepidoptera
- Family: Nymphalidae
- Genus: Taenaris
- Species: T. artemis

Binomial name
- Taenaris artemis (Vollenhoven, 1860)

Synonyms
- List: Drusilla artemis Vollenhoven, 1860; Tenaris barbata Kirby, 1889; Taenaris artemis eleusina Fruhstorfer, 1904; Taenaris artemis f. timesides Fruhstorfer, 1905; Tenaris jamesi Butler, [1877]; Tenaris sticheli Fruhstorfer, 1901; Tenaris sticheli Fruhstorfer, 1902; Tenaris staudingeri Honrath, 1889; Tenaris onesimus Butler, 1877; Taenaris artemis staudingeri ab. infumata Fruhstorfer, 1905; Taenaris artemis staudingeri ab. limbatus Fruhstorfer, 1905; Taenaris artemis staudingeri ab. artemides Fruhstorfer, 1905; Taenaris artemis ab. monops Fruhstorfer, 1905; Taenaris staudingeri ab. simonetta Fruhstorfer, 1905; Taenaris rothschildi reducta Rothschild, 1915; Taenaris zetes Brooks, 1944; Tenaris affinis Kirby, 1889; Tenaris melanops Grose-Smith, 1897

= Taenaris artemis =

Species of butterfly

Taenaris artemis is a species of butterfly in the family Nymphalidae. It was first described by Samuel Constantinus Snellen van Vollenhoven in 1860. It is found in the Australasian realm

== Subspecies ==
- T. a. artemis (West Irian, Mioswar Island)
- T. a. jamesi Butler, [1877] (Papua, Yule Island, Darnley Island)
- T. a. staudingeri (Honrath, 1889) (New Guinea)
- T. a. gisela Fruhstorfer, 1904 (Waigeu)
- T. a. celsa Fruhstorfer, 1904 (Salawati)
- T. a. ziada Fruhstorfer, 1904 (Misool)
- T. a. myopina Fruhstorfer, 1904 (Aru)
- T. a. zenada Fruhstorfer, 1904 (New Guinea: Onin Peninsula to Geelvink Bay, Kapaur)
- T. a. blandina Fruhstorfer, 1904 (Jobi Island)
- T. a. humboldti Fruhstorfer, 1904 (Humboldt Bay)
- T. a. electra Fruhstorfer, 1904 (Fergusson, Goodenough, Normanby)
- T. a. tineutus Fruhstorfer, 1905 (Woodlark Island)
- T. a. reducta Rothschild, 1915 (Vulcan Island, Manam Island)
- T. a. queenslandica Rothschild, 1916 (northern Queensland: Cape York)
- T. a. madu Brooks, 1944 (Biak)
- T. a. pedus Brooks, 1944 (Gebe Island)
- T. a. zetes Brooks, 1944 (Murray Island)
- T. a. affinis Kirby, 1889 (Rossel Island, Yela Island)
- T. a. melanops Grose-Smith, 1897 (Sud Est, New Guinea, Tagula Island)
