= Thomas Horsfield =

American naturalist and physician (1773–1859)

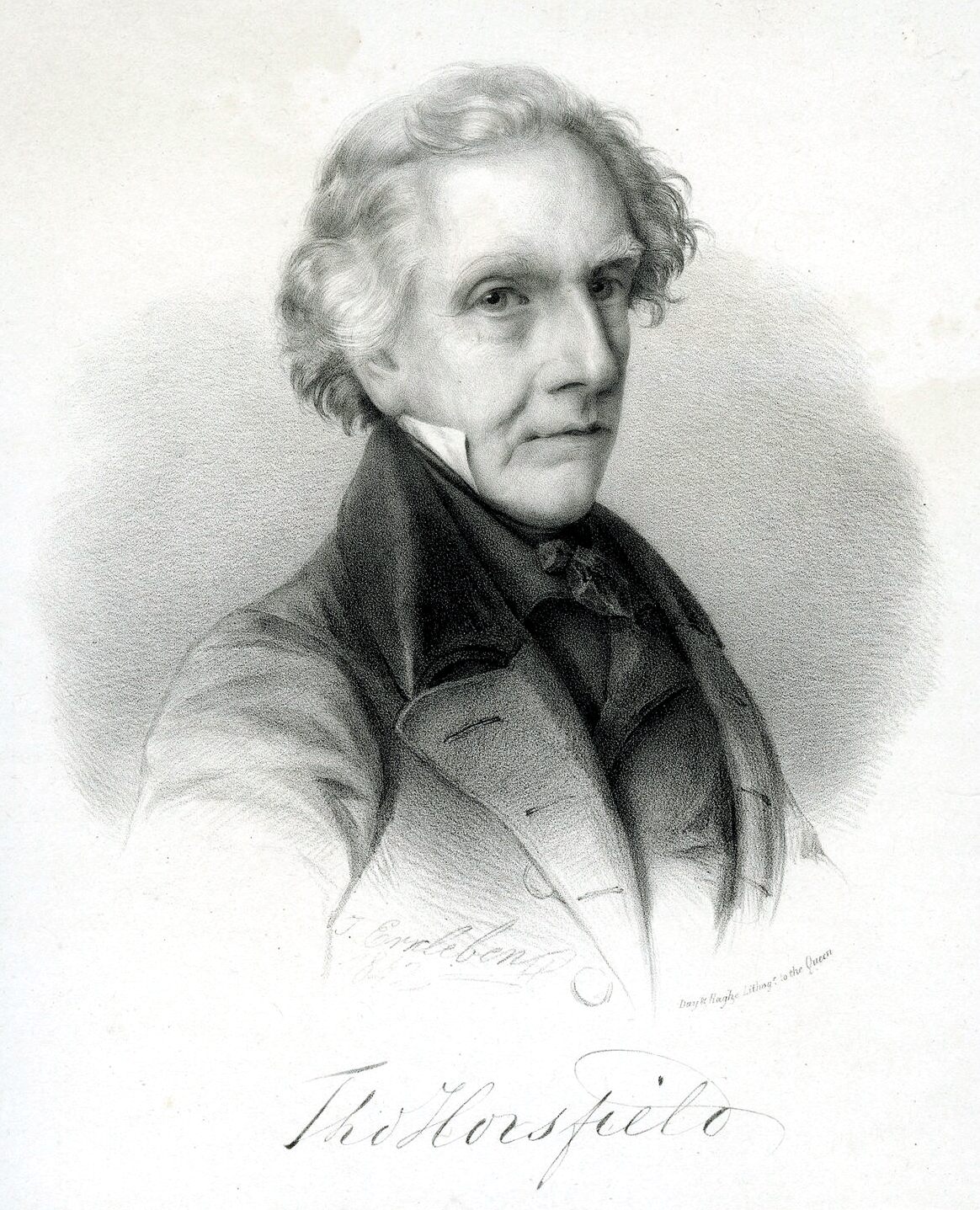
- Portrait by J. Erxleben
- Born: May 12, 1773; Bethlehem, Pennsylvania
- Died: July 24, 1859 (aged 86); Camden Town, London
- Education: University of Pennsylvania
- Known for: botany and insects of Java
- Scientific career
- Fields: Medicine, entomology, botany
- Institutions: Dutch Colonial Army in Batavia, museum of the East India Company
- Author abbrev. (botany): Horsf.

Thomas Horsfield (May 12, 1773 – July 24, 1859) was an American medical doctor and naturalist who worked extensively in Indonesia, describing numerous species of plants and animals from the region. He was later a curator of the East India Company Museum in London.

== Early life ==
Horsfield was born in Bethlehem, Pennsylvania, and studied medicine at the University of Pennsylvania. He was the grandson of Timothy Horsfield, Sr. (1708-1773), who was born in Liverpool and emigrated to New York in 1725. The Horsfield family converted from the Church of England to Moravianism, a Protestant denomination with a strong emphasis on education. In 1748, he moved his family to Bethlehem, Pennsylvania and joined them the next year. Horsfield's father was Timothy Horsfield, Jr. and he married Juliana Sarah Parsons in 1738. Thomas Horsfield was born in Bethlehem on May 12, 1773. He was educated at the Moravian schools in Bethlehem and Nazareth. He studied medicine at the University of Pennsylvania and graduated in 1798. His thesis on the physiological effects of poison ivy demonstrated his interest in botany.

== Travels in Asia ==
In 1799, he accepted a post as surgeon on the vessel China, a merchant vessel that was to sail to Java. He passed through Batavia and was struck by the beauty of the region. In 1801, he applied to be a surgeon with the Dutch Colonial Army in Batavia. Taking up appointment there, he took an interest in the flora, fauna, and geology of the region. In particular, he studied the botany and the insects of the region. One of the first of many species to named after him was the butterfly, Taenaris horsfieldii. The East India Company took control of the island from the Dutch in 1811, and Horsfield began to collect natural history specimens on behalf of the governor and friend Sir Thomas Stamford Raffles. In 1816, Java was restored to the Dutch and Horsfield moved west to Sumatra. In 1819, he was forced to leave the island due to ill health, and returned to London on board the Lady Raffles.

== England ==
On returning to London, Horsfield continued to be in contact with Sir Stamford Raffles and became a keeper of the museum of the East India Company on Leadenhall Street, London, working under Charles Wilkins. He stayed in this position, later as a curator, until his death on July 24, 1859. Horsfield took an interest in geology, botany, zoology, and entomology. He was influenced by William Sharp Macleay and his quinarian system of classification. He was a fellow of the Royal Society of London (1828) and a fellow of the Linnean Society (1820), later becoming a vice president. In 1828, he was elected a member of the American Philosophical Society. Horsfield was appointed assistant secretary of the Zoological Society of London at its formation in 1826. In 1833, he was a founder of what became the Royal Entomological Society of London. He was elected a fellow of the Royal Society in 1828. In 1838, he became correspondent of the Royal Institute of the Netherlands; when that became the Royal Netherlands Academy of Arts and Sciences in 1851, he joined as foreign member. Horsfield died at his home in Camden Town and was buried at the Moravian cemetery in Chelsea.

== Published works ==
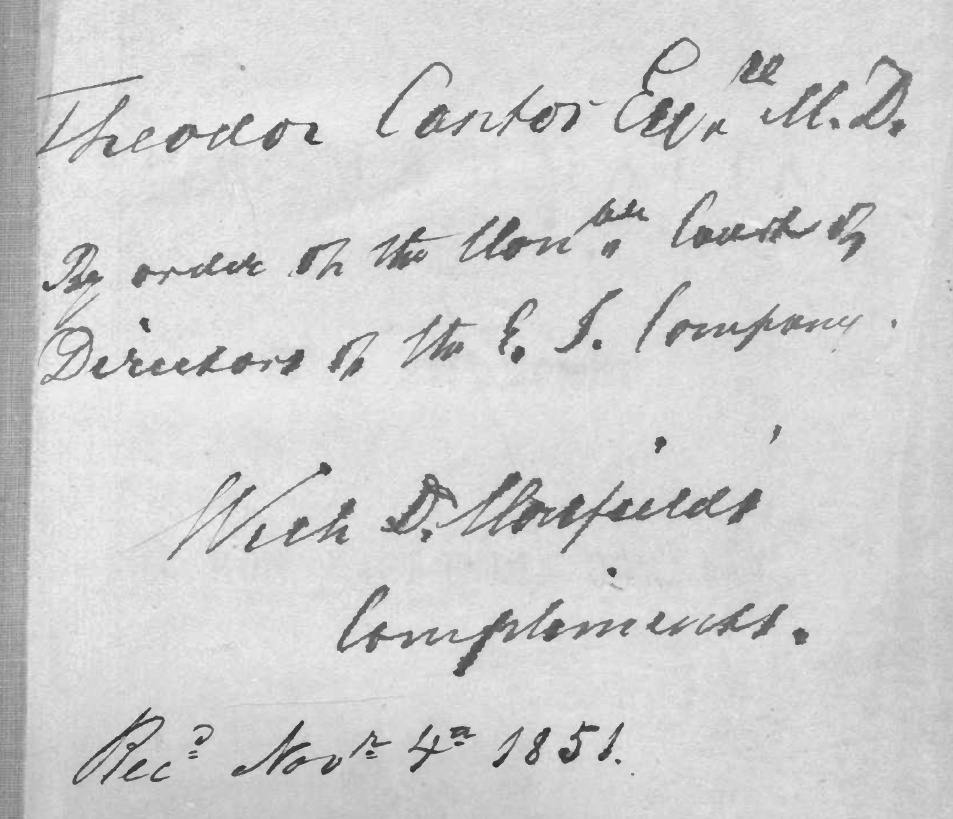
Writing on Horsfield's Catalogue of the mammals in the East India Company Museum on a copy to Theodore Edward Cantor

Horsfield wrote Zoological Researches in Java and the Neighbouring Islands (1824). He also classified a number of birds with Nicholas Aylward Vigors, most notably in their A Description of the Australian Birds in the Collection of the Linnean Society; With an Attempt at Arranging them According to Their Natural Affinities (Trans. Linn. Soc. Lond. (1827)). Together with the botanists Robert Brown and John Joseph Bennett he published the Plantae Javanicae rariores (1838–52).

== Legacy ==
Horsfield is commemorated in the names of a number of animals and plants, including:

- Javanese flying squirrel, Iomys horsfieldii
- Horsfield's fruit bat, Cynopterus horsfieldi
- Horsfield's shrew, Crocidura horsfieldi
- Horsfield's bat, Myotis horsfieldii, a species of small bat in the family Vespertilionidae
- Horsfield's flying gecko, Gekko horsfieldii, a species of Asian gliding lizard
- Russian tortoise, Testudo horsfieldii
- Horsfield's spiny lizard, Salea horsfieldii, a species of agamid lizard found in southern India in the Nilgiri and Palni Hills
- Malabar whistling thrush, Myophonus horsfieldii, a bird found in peninsular India
- Indian scimitar-babbler, Pomatorhinus horsfieldii, an Old World babbler found in peninsular India
- White's thrush (Horsfield's thrush), Zoothera horsfieldi, a resident bird in Indonesia.
- Oriental cuckoo, Cuculus horsfieldi
- Horsfield's bronze cuckoo, Chrysococcyx basalis
- Common darkie, Paragerydus horsfieldii, a small butterfly found in India
- Arhopala horsfieldi, a butterfly of the family Lycaenidae found in Asia
- South Indian blue oakleaf, Kallima horsfieldii, a nymphalid butterfly found in India
- Horsfieldia, a plant genus in the family Myristicaceae native to Southeast Asia
- Horsfield's Tarsier, Cephalopachus bancanus

Zoological and botanical specimens collected by Horsfield are deposited in museums and herbaria across the world, including at the Natural History Museum, London of the United Kingdom, the Kew Herbarium, and the National Herbarium of Victoria (MEL), Royal Botanic Gardens Victoria.

== See also ==
- Category:Taxa named by Thomas Horsfield
