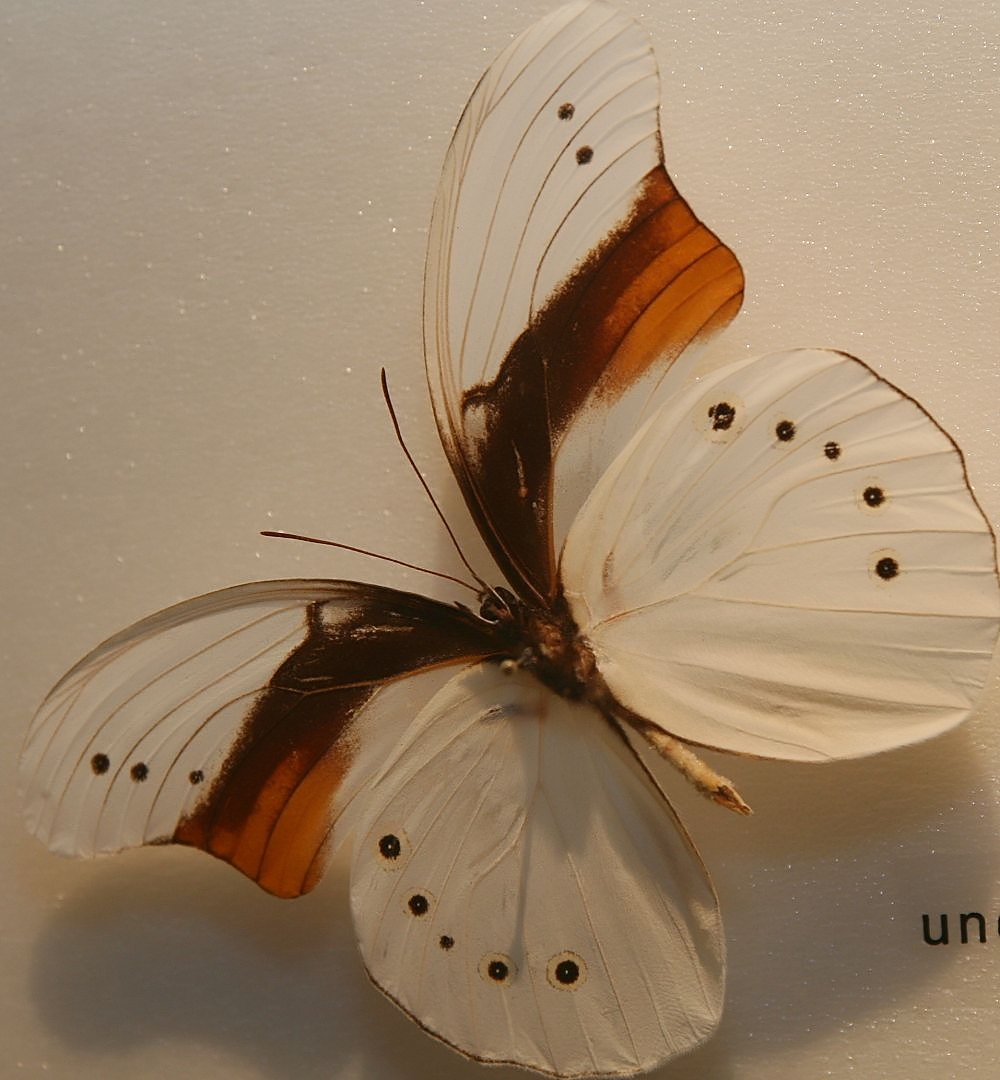

Scientific classification
- Domain: Eukaryota
- Kingdom: Animalia
- Phylum: Arthropoda
- Class: Insecta
- Order: Lepidoptera
- Family: Nymphalidae
- Genus: Taenaris
- Species: T. schoenbergi

Binomial name
- Taenaris schoenbergi (Fruhstorfer, 1893)

Synonyms
- Morphotenaris schoenbergi Fruhstorfer, 1893; Morphotenaris schönbergi Fruhstorfer, 1893; Taenaris flavipalpis (Rothschild, 1916); Taenaris wollastoni (Rothschild, 1916)

= Taenaris schoenbergi =

Species of butterfly

Taenaris schoenbergi is a species of butterfly in the family Nymphalidae. It is endemic to New Guinea.

== Subspecies ==
- Taenaris schoenbergi schoenbergi
- Taenaris schoenbergi kenricki Bethune-Baker (West Irian: Angi Lakes)
- Taenaris schoenbergi wandammenensis (Joicey & Talbot, 1916) (New Guinea)
- Taenaris schoenbergi weylandensis (Joicey & Talbot, 1922) (West Irian: Weyland Mountains)
- Taenaris schoenbergi littoralis Rothschild & Durrant (Papua (Hydrographes Mountains)
- Taenaris schoenbergi vanheurni Bakker, 1942
