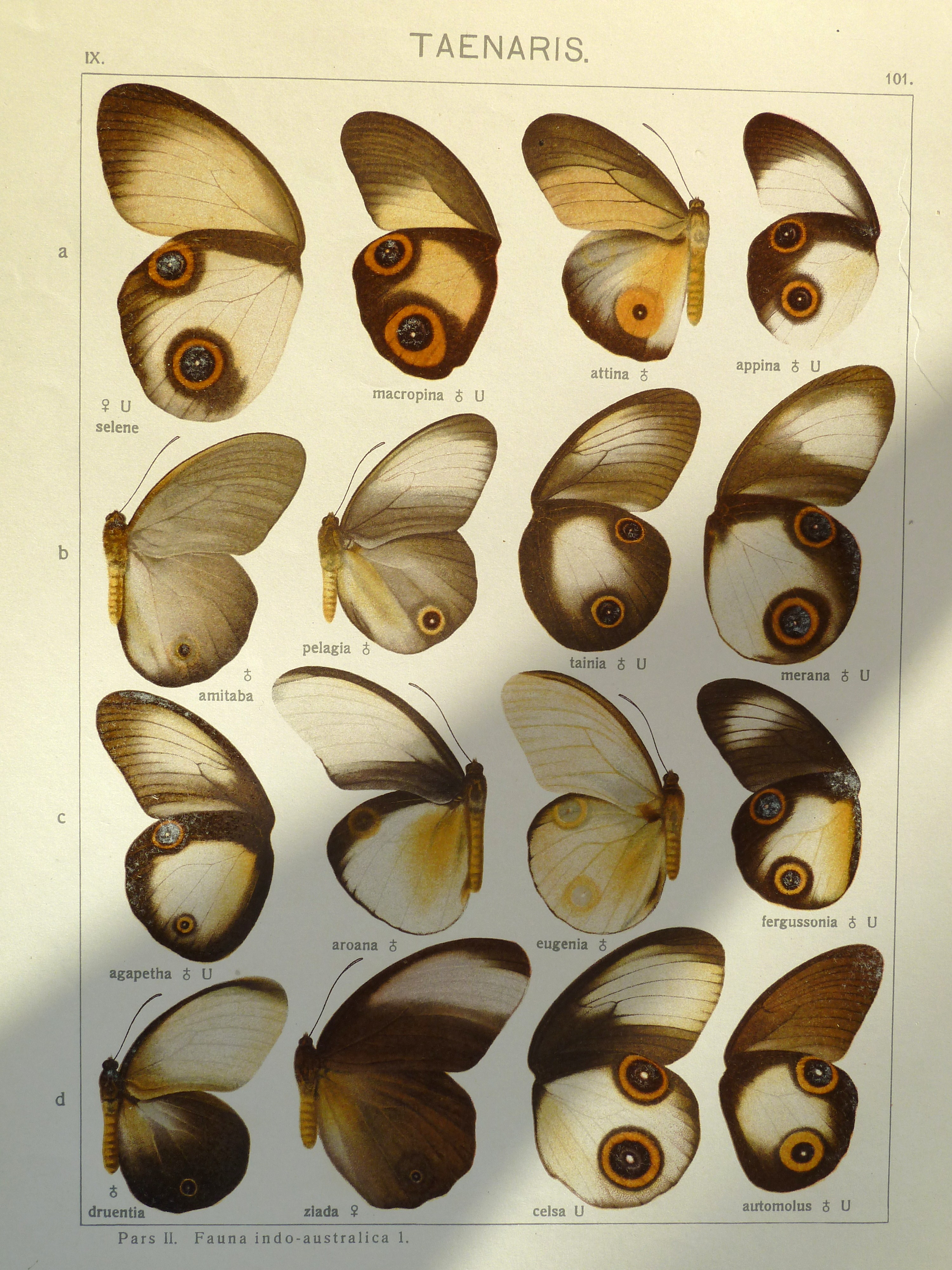
- Taenaris dioptrica amitaba in Adalbert Seitz's Die Großschmetterlinge der Erde

Scientific classification
- Domain: Eukaryota
- Kingdom: Animalia
- Phylum: Arthropoda
- Class: Insecta
- Order: Lepidoptera
- Family: Nymphalidae
- Genus: Taenaris
- Species: T. dioptrica

Binomial name
- Taenaris dioptrica (Vollenhoven, 1860)

Synonyms
- Drusilla dioptrica Vollenhoven, 1860; Taenaris dioptrica orientalis Rothschild, 1916; Taenaris timesias Kirsch, 1877; Tenaris hyperbolus onesimides Fruhstorfer, 1904; Tenaris dioptrica wattina Fruhstorfer, 1904; Taenaris tainia anella Stichel, 1906; Tenaris hyperbolus licinia Fruhstorfer, 1904; Tenaris hyperbolus amitaba Fruhstorfer, 1904; Tenaris helice Brooks, 1944

= Taenaris dioptrica =

Species of butterfly

Taenaris dioptrica is a butterfly in the family Nymphalidae. It was described by Samuel Constantinus Snellen van Vollenhoven in 1860. It is found in New Guinea in the Australasian realm.

== Subspecies ==
- T. d. dioptrica (New Guinea, Salawati, Jobi Island)
- T. d. licinia (Fruhstorfer, 1904) (Jobi Island
- T. d. rileyi Hulstaert, 1925 (New Guinea - Oetakwa River, Eilanden River)
- T. d. amitaba (Fruhstorfer, 1904) (Waigeu)
- T. d. helice (Brooks, 1944) (Gebe Island)
