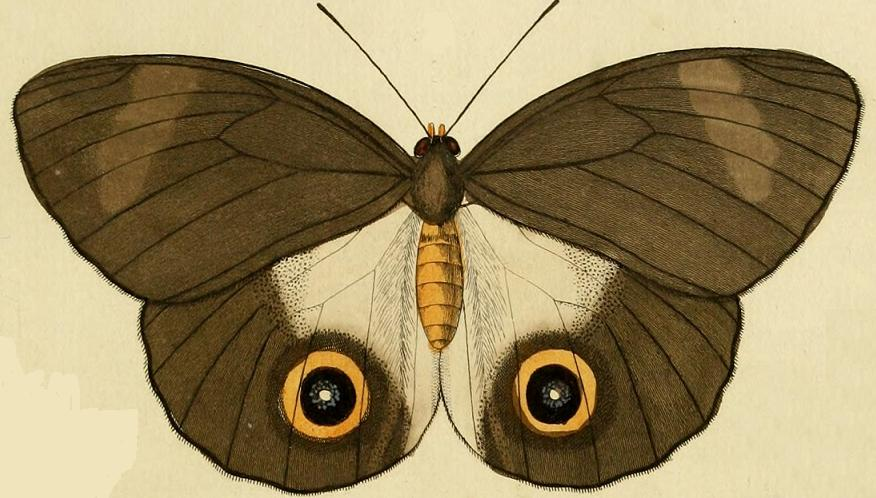

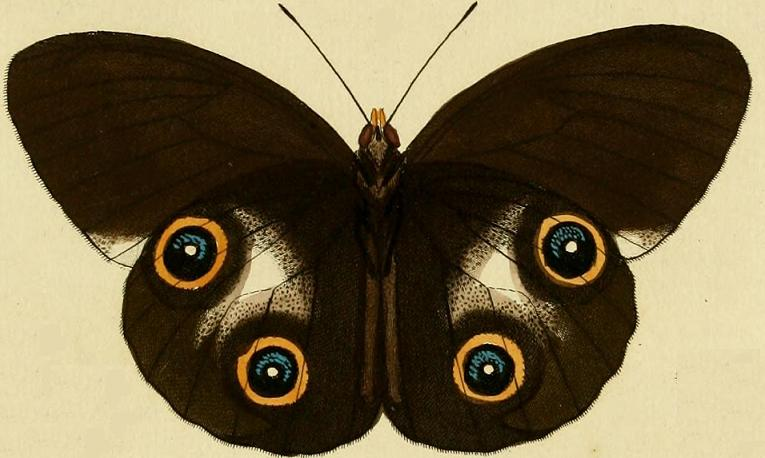

Scientific classification
- Kingdom: Animalia
- Phylum: Arthropoda
- Clade: Pancrustacea
- Class: Insecta
- Order: Lepidoptera
- Family: Nymphalidae
- Genus: Taenaris
- Species: T. urania

Binomial name
- Taenaris urania (Linnaeus, 1758)

Synonyms
- Papilio urania Linnaeus, 1758; Papilio jairus Cramer, [1775]; Tenaris nysa Hübner, [1819]

= Taenaris urania =

Species of butterfly

Taenaris urania is a butterfly in the family Nymphalidae. It is found in Indonesia.

== Subspecies ==
- Taenaris urania urania (Ambon, Saparua)
- Taenaris urania pandemos Fruhstorfer, 1911 (Serang, Gisser Islands)
- Taenaris urania hollandi Fruhstorfer, 1904 (Buru)
