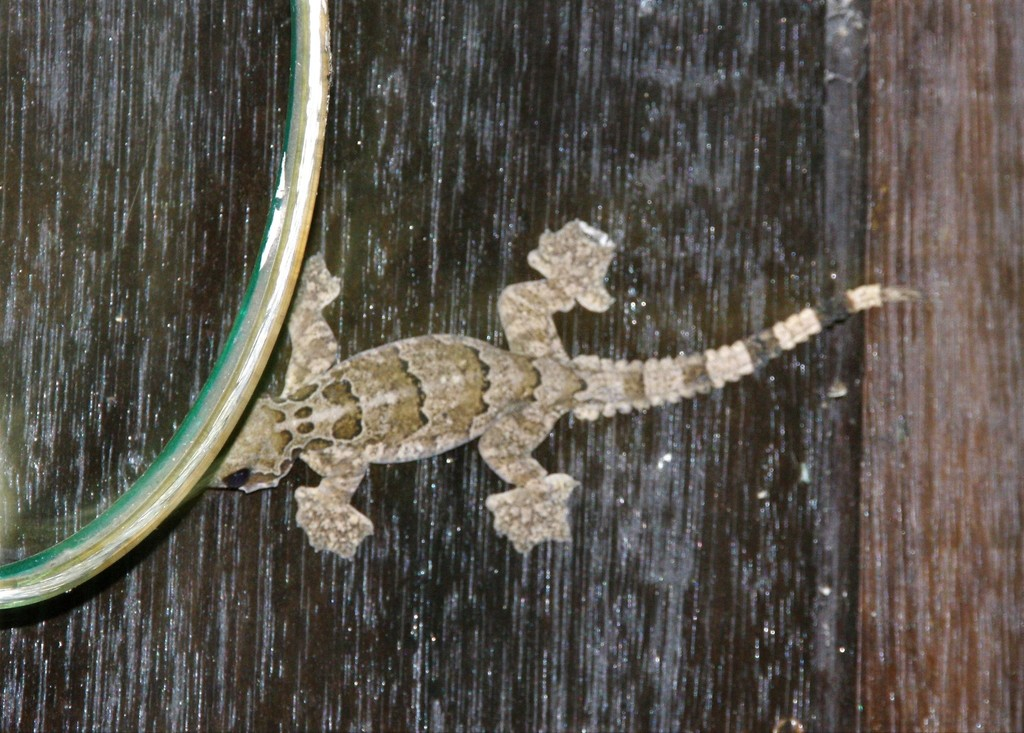

Conservation status
- Least Concern (IUCN 3.1)

Scientific classification
- Kingdom: Animalia
- Phylum: Chordata
- Class: Reptilia
- Order: Squamata
- Suborder: Gekkota
- Family: Gekkonidae
- Genus: Gekko
- Species: G. horsfieldii

Binomial name
- Gekko horsfieldii (Gray, 1827)
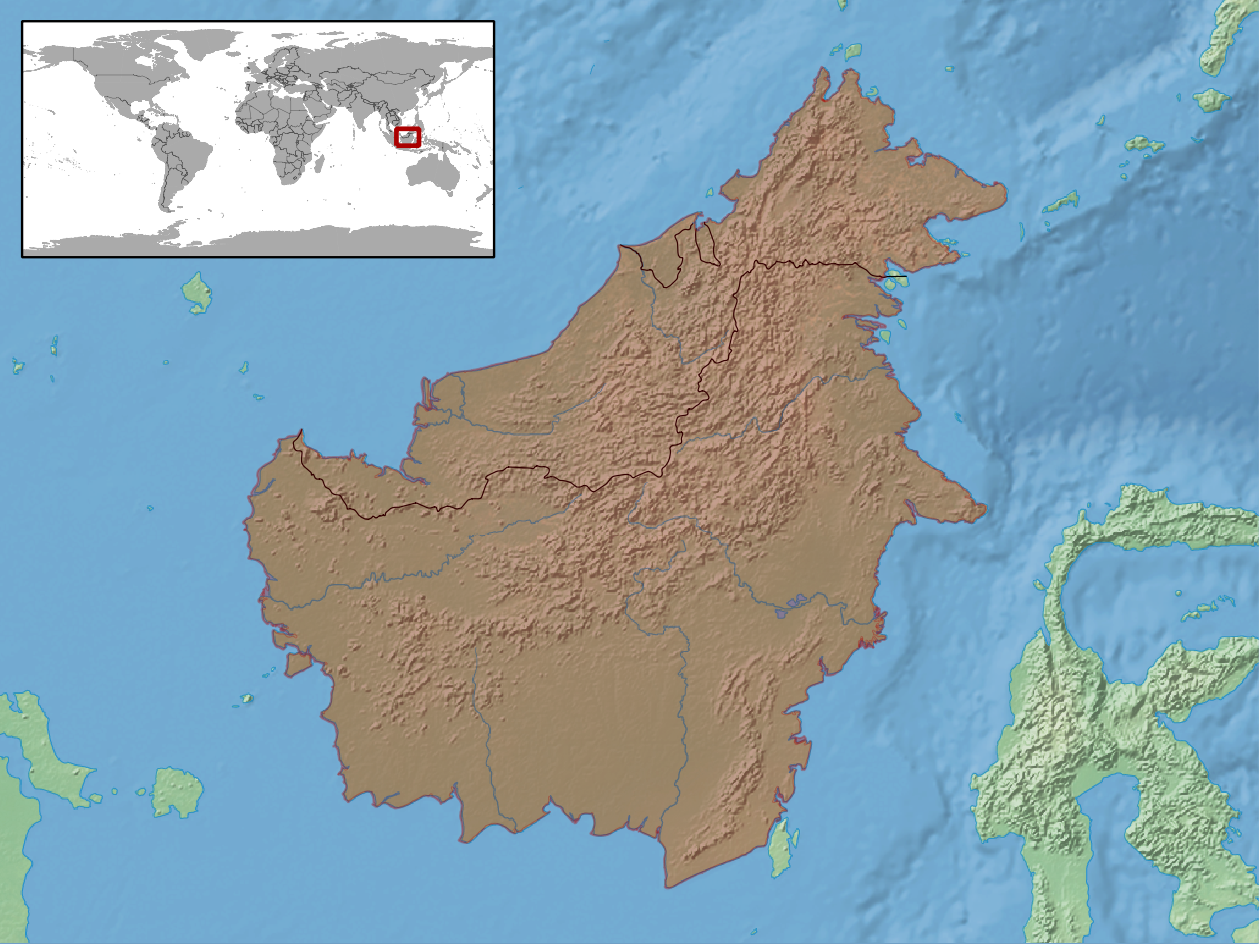

Synonyms
- Pteropleura horsfieldii Gray, 1827; Platydactylus horsfieldii — Fitzinger, 1843; Ptychozoon homalocephala Gray, 1845; Ptychozoon horsfieldii — F. Müller, 1892; Gekko (Ptychozoon) horsfieldii — Wood et al., 2019

= Gekko horsfieldii =

Species of lizard

Gekko horsfieldii, also known commonly as Horsfield's flying gecko, Horsfield's gliding gecko, and Horsfield's parachute gecko, is a species of lizard in the family Gekkonidae. The species is endemic to Asia.

== Etymology ==
The specific name, horsfieldii, is in honor of American naturalist Thomas Horsfield.

== Geographic range ==
G. horsfieldii is found in Brunei, Indonesia, Malaysia, Myanmar, Sarawak, Singapore, Sumatra, and Thailand.

== Habitat ==
The preferred natural habitat of G. horsfieldii is forest, at altitudes from sea level to 300 m (980 ft).

== Description ==
G. horsfieldii may attain a snout-to-vent length (SVL) of 8 cm (3.1 in).

== Diet ==
G. horsfieldii preys upon small insects.

== Reproduction ==
G. horsfieldii is oviparous. The adult female lays a clutch of two eggs. Each egg measures 13.7 by 11.9 mm (0.54 by 0.47 in).
