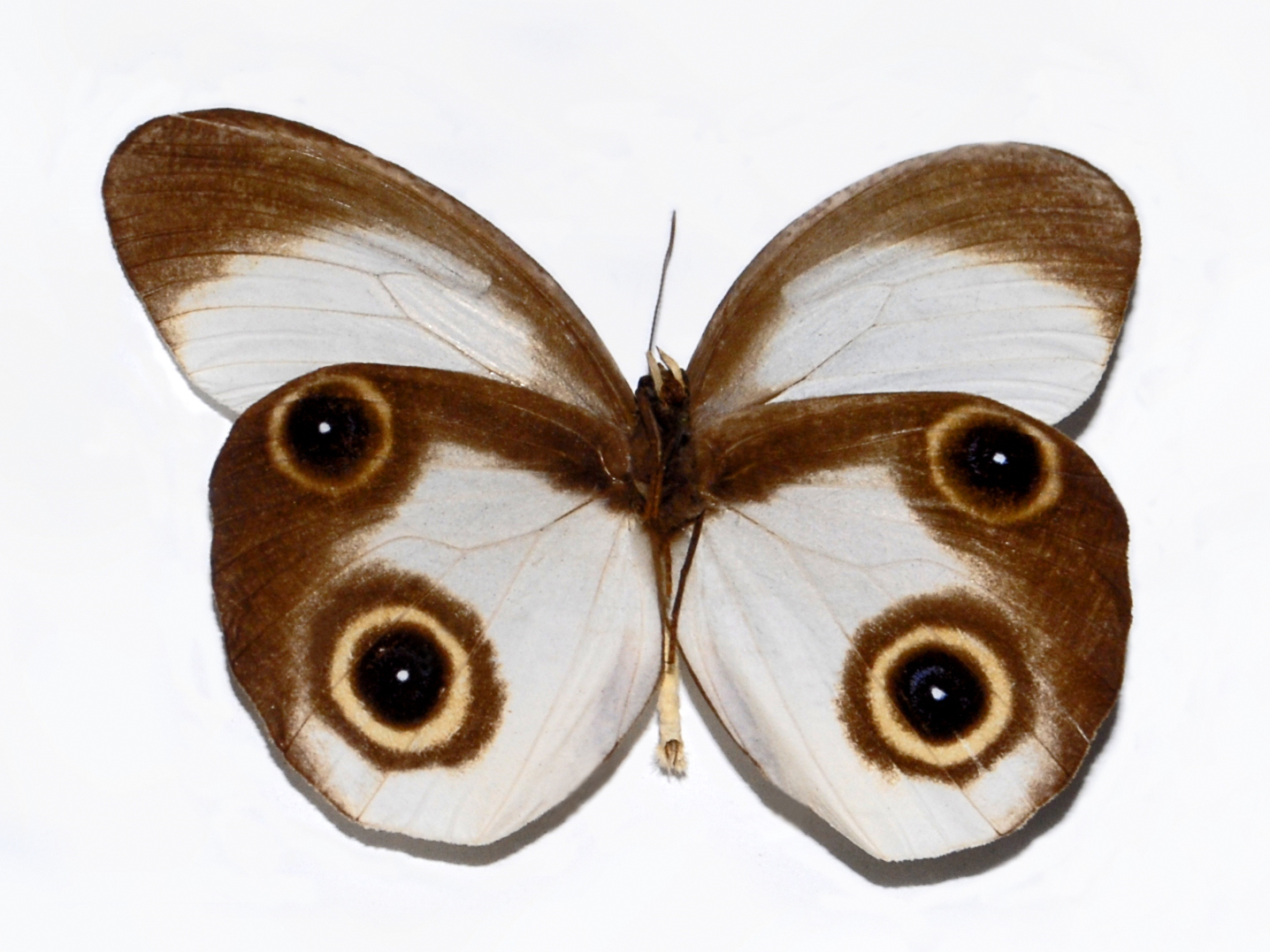
- Mounted specimen, underside

Scientific classification
- Domain: Eukaryota
- Kingdom: Animalia
- Phylum: Arthropoda
- Class: Insecta
- Order: Lepidoptera
- Family: Nymphalidae
- Genus: Taenaris
- Species: T. macrops

Binomial name
- Taenaris macrops (C. Felder & R. Felder, 1860)

Synonyms
- Drusilla macrops C. Felder & R. Felder, 1860

= Taenaris macrops =

Species of butterfly

Taenaris macrops, the silky owl, is a butterfly of the family Nymphalidae. The species was first described by Cajetan Felder and Rudolf Felder in 1860.

== Subspecies ==
- Taenaris macrops macrop (Bachan, Halmahera, Morotai)
- Taenaris macrops macropina (Fruhstorfer, 1904) (Obi)
- Taenaris macrops ternatana Fruhstorfer, 1909 (Ternate)

== Description ==
Taenaris macrops has a wingspan of about 80–90 millimetres (3.1–3.5 in). Wings are whitish, with dark brown edges. Upperside of each hindwing has one large ocellated spot, while undersides of each hinding show two large bright eyespots, of which the centre is blackish with a small white central eye, broadly surrounded with yellowish.

== Distribution ==
This species can be found in the northern Maluku Islands.
