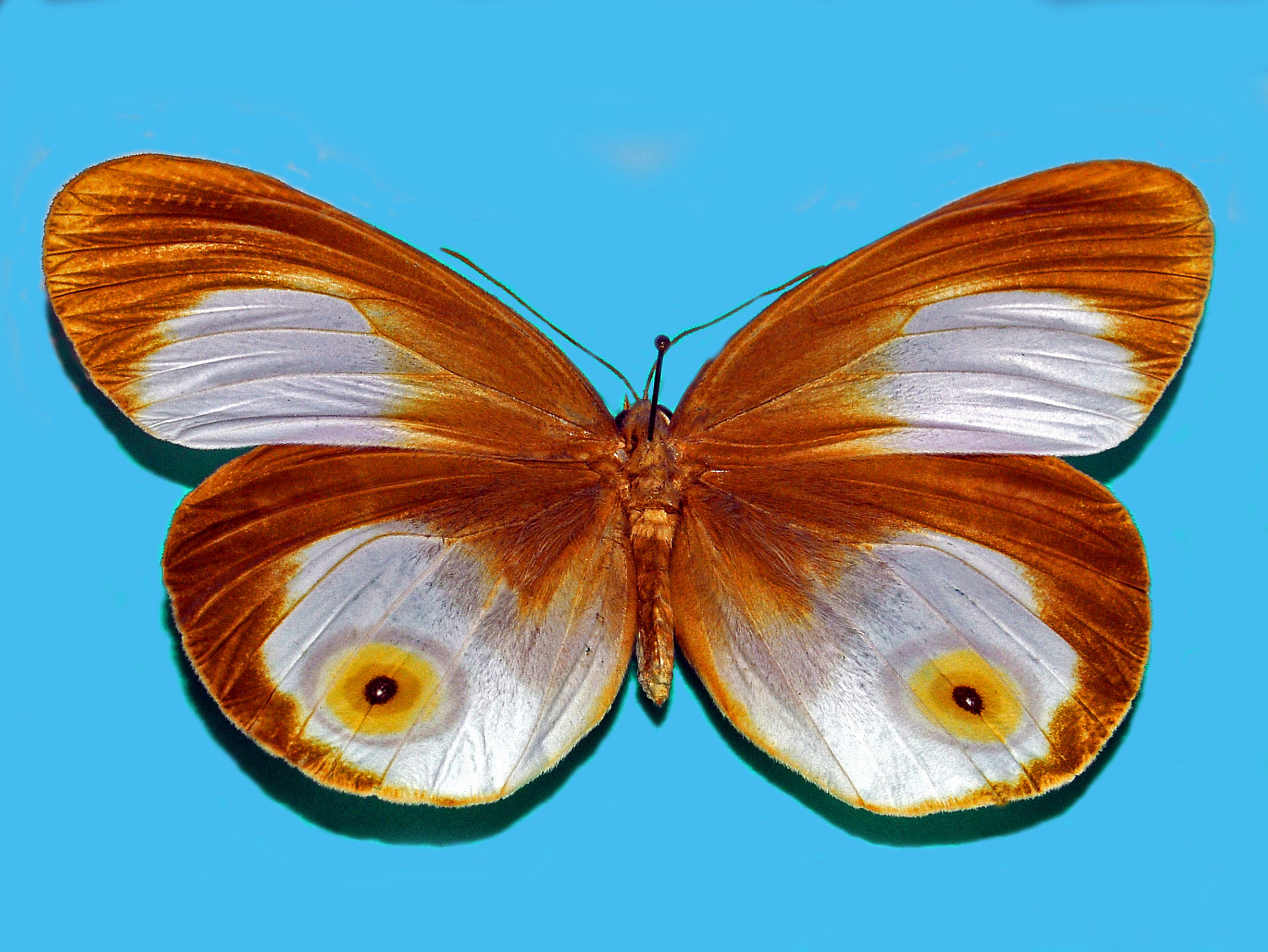
- Upperside
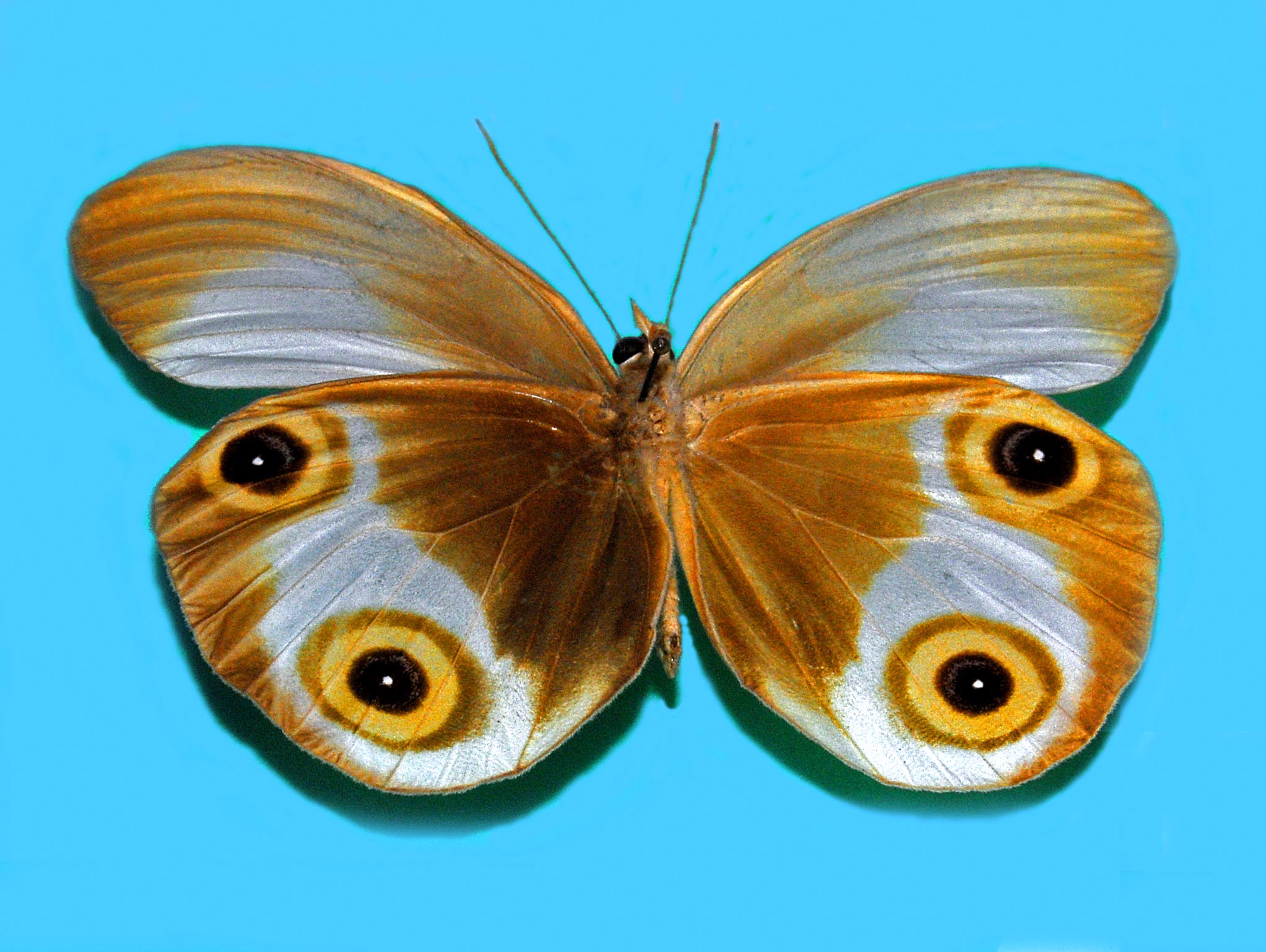
- Underside

Scientific classification
- Kingdom: Animalia
- Phylum: Arthropoda
- Class: Insecta
- Order: Lepidoptera
- Family: Nymphalidae
- Genus: Taenaris
- Species: T. phorcas

Binomial name
- Taenaris phorcas (Westwood, 1858)

Synonyms
- Drusilla phorcas Westwood, 1858; Drusilla anableps Vollenhoven, 1860; Taenaris bougainvilleana Strand, 1914; Taenaris atesta Rebel, 1895; Taenaris farona Fruhstorfer, 1912; Tanearis phorcas umbonius Fruhstorfer, 1905; Tenaris anableps uranus Staudinger, 1888

= Taenaris phorcas =

Species of butterfly

Taenaris phorcas is a butterfly of the subfamily Morphinae in the family Nymphalidae.

== Subspecies ==
Subspecies include:

- Taenaris phorcas phorcas (Bismarck Archipelago - Solomon Islands)
- Taenaris phorcas uranus Staudinger, 1888 (Bismarck Archipelago - Crown Island)
- Taenaris phorcas admiralitatis Rothschild, 1916 (Admiralty Islands)

== Distribution ==
This species can be found in the Solomon Islands and Bismarck Archipelago.

== Description ==
The upperside of the wings contains large white blotches, with broad brown edges and a wide eyespot surrounded with yellow orange located in the white area of the hindwings. The underside of the hindwings shows an outer angle completely brown and a wide patch with two large black eyespots surrounded with yellow orange. The abdomen is brown.

== Biology ==
Larvae of this species feed on Dracaena species.
