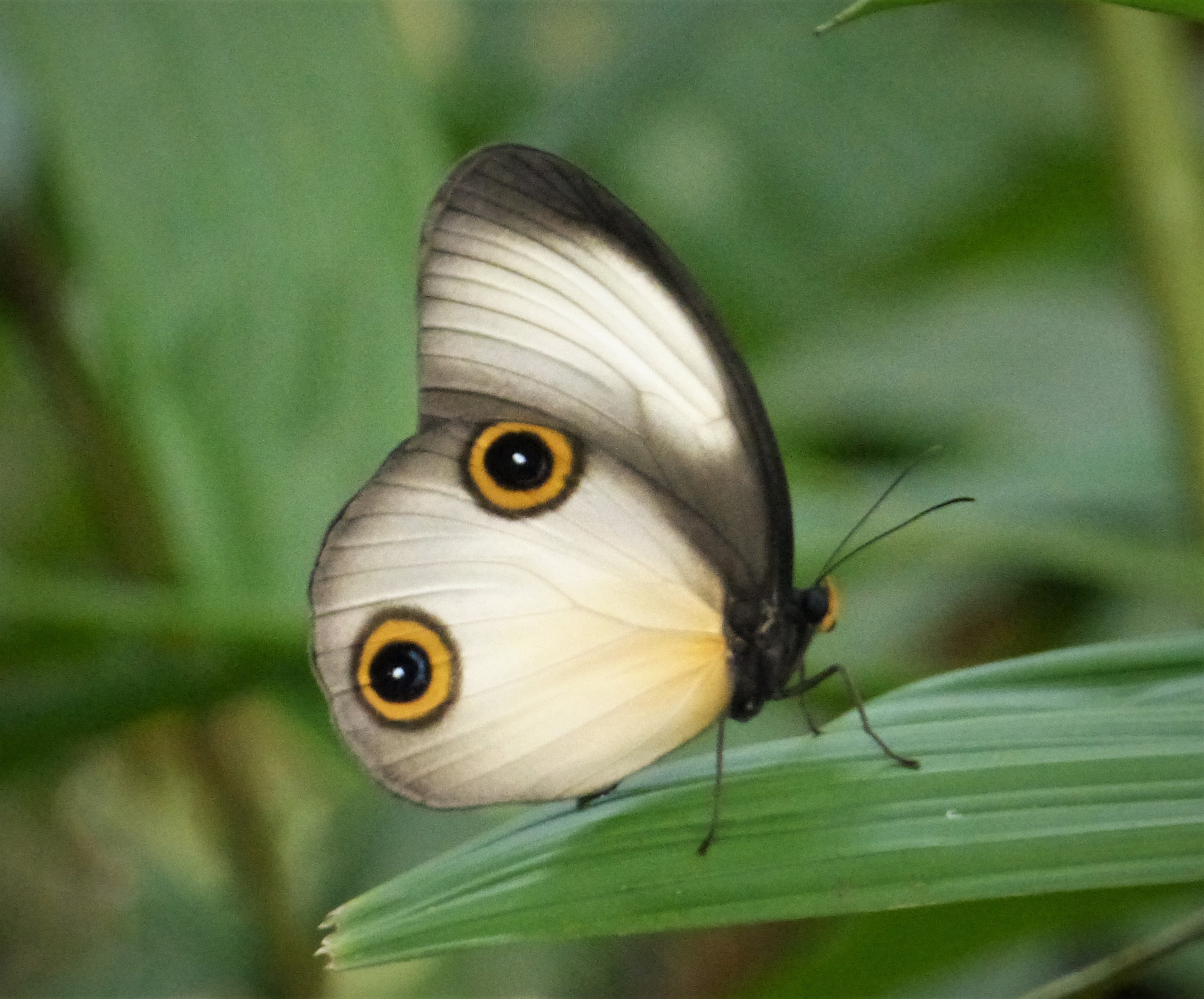
- Taenaris artemis

Scientific classification
- Domain: Eukaryota
- Kingdom: Animalia
- Phylum: Arthropoda
- Class: Insecta
- Order: Lepidoptera
- Family: Nymphalidae
- Tribe: Amathusiini
- Genus: Taenaris; Hübner, 1819

Type species
- Papilio urania Linnaeus, 1758

Synonyms
- Hiades Guérin-Ménéville, 1838; Hyades Boisduval, 1832; Tenaris Hübner, 1819; Drusilla Swainson, 1820; Morphotenaris Fruhstorfer, 1893; Elymniotenaris Fruhstorfer, 1911

= Taenaris =

Genus of butterflies

Taenaris is a genus of butterflies in the family Nymphalidae, subfamily Amathusiinae, that distributed throughout Australasia with a majority of species being located on the island of New Guinea. They are commonly known as the owl butterflies.

Taenaris are showy medium to large butterflies with predominantly white wings often featuring extensive patches of black, gray, or tan coloration. They are best known for their rounded hindwings which feature well developed eyespots, most of which are yellow in color with blue-black "pupils". Due to their larval diet consisting of toxic cycasin-rich foodplants, many members of genus are involved within Müllerian mimicry complexes.

== Distribution ==
Members of the genus Taenaris are found throughout Southeast Asia and Australasia. Their range extends from Malaysia and into the Moluccas and New Guinea and as far east as the Solomon Islands and as far south as the Torres Strait and Cape York, Australia. A majority of species are concentrated on the island of New Guinea, and thus east of Weber's line. Only a few species extend beyond New Guinea, including Taenaris horsfeldii (found in Sundaland and west of Weber's line), Taenaris phorcas (Bismark Archipelago and Solomon Archipelago), and Taenaris urania (Moluccas).

== Mimicry ==
Members of the genus Taenaris often serve as models within Müllerian mimicry complexes with a variety of different butterfly species, owing to their exclusive diet of Cycads and high levels of toxic cycasin within their bodies. Mimics of Taenaris species include pale forms of Papilio aegeus (Papilionidae), Elymnias agondas (Nymphalidae), Hypolimnas deois (Nymphalidae), Mycalesis drusillodes (Nymphalidae), and Hyantis hodeva (Nymphalidae).

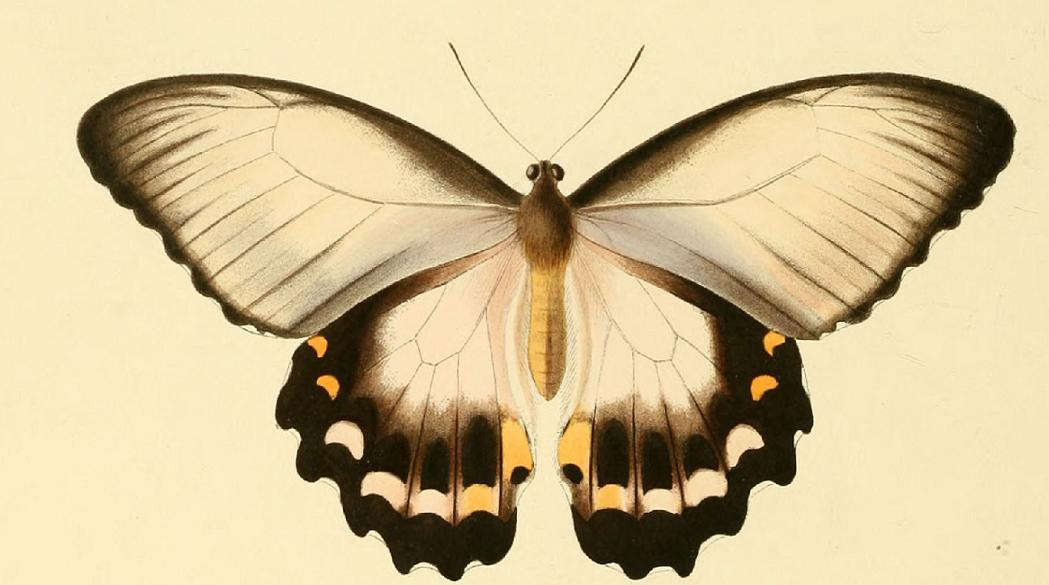
Papilio aegeus

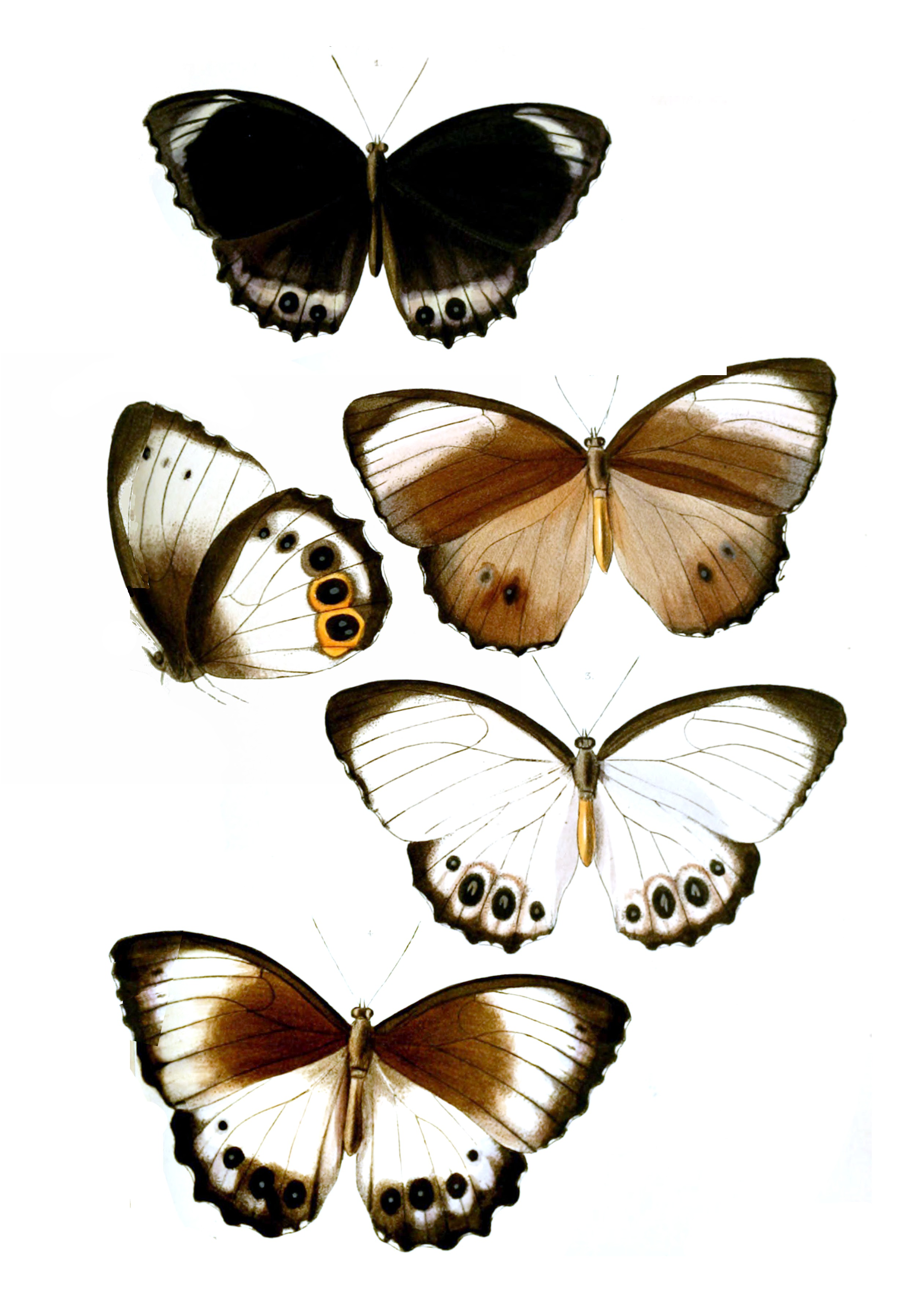
Elymnias agondas

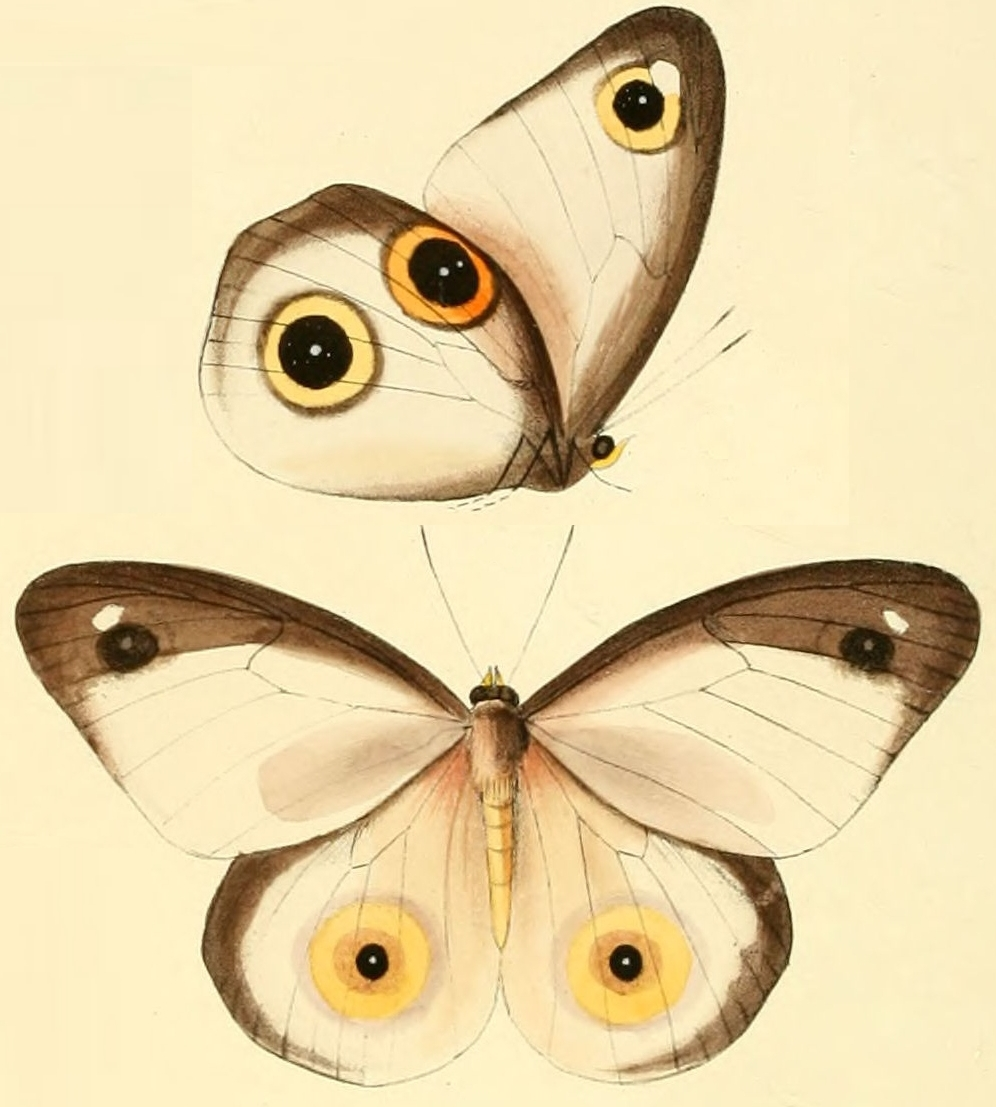
Hyantis hodeva

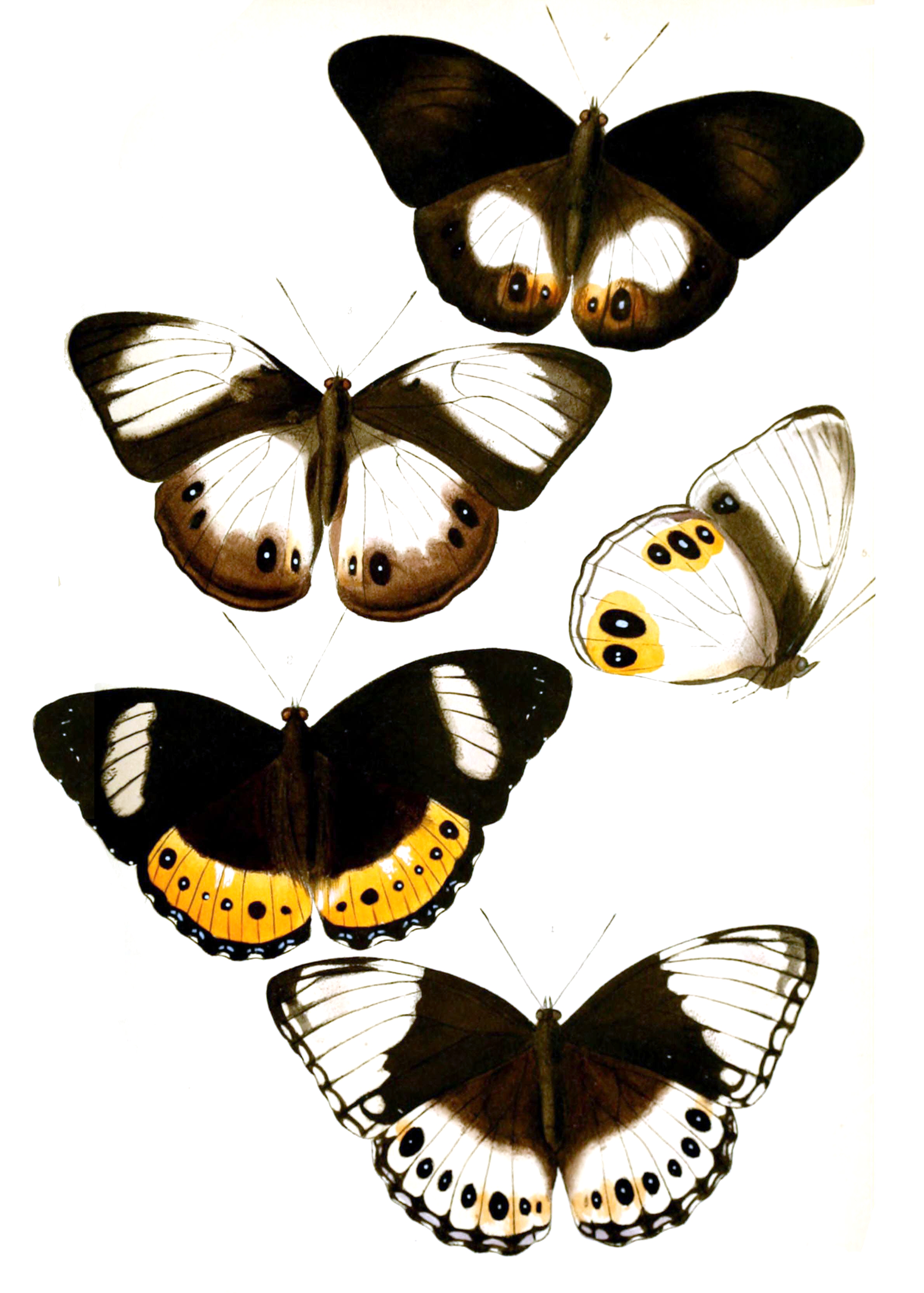
Hypolimnas deois

== Species ==
- unknown species group
  - Taenaris alocus Brooks, 1950
  - Taenaris artemis (Vollenhoven, 1860)
  - Taenaris bioculatus (Guérin-Méneville, [1830])
  - Taenaris butleri (Oberthür, 1880)
  - Taenaris catops (Westwood, 1851)
  - Taenaris chionides (Godman & Salvin, 1880)
  - Taenaris cyclops Staudinger, 1894
  - Taenaris diana Butler, 1870
  - Taenaris dimona (Hewitson, 1862)
  - Taenaris dina Staudinger, 1894
  - Taenaris dioptrica (Vollenhoven, 1860)
  - Taenaris domitilla (Hewitson, 1861)
  - Taenaris gorgo (Kirsch, 1877)
  - Taenaris honrathi Staudinger, 1887
  - Taenaris horsfieldii (Swainson, [1820])
  - Taenaris hyperbolus (Kirsch, 1877)
  - Taenaris macrops (C. & R. Felder, 1860)
  - Taenaris mailua Grose-Smith, 1897
  - Taenaris montana Stichel, 1906
  - Taenaris myops (C. & R. Felder, 1860)
  - Taenaris onolaus (Kirsch, 1877)
  - Taenaris phorcas (Westwood, 1858)
  - Taenaris scylla Staudinger, 1887
  - Taenaris selene (Westwood, 1851)
  - Taenaris urania (Linnaeus, 1758)
- morphotenaris species group
  - Taenaris nivescens (Rothschild, 1896)
  - Taenaris schoenbergi (Fruhstorfer, 1893)
