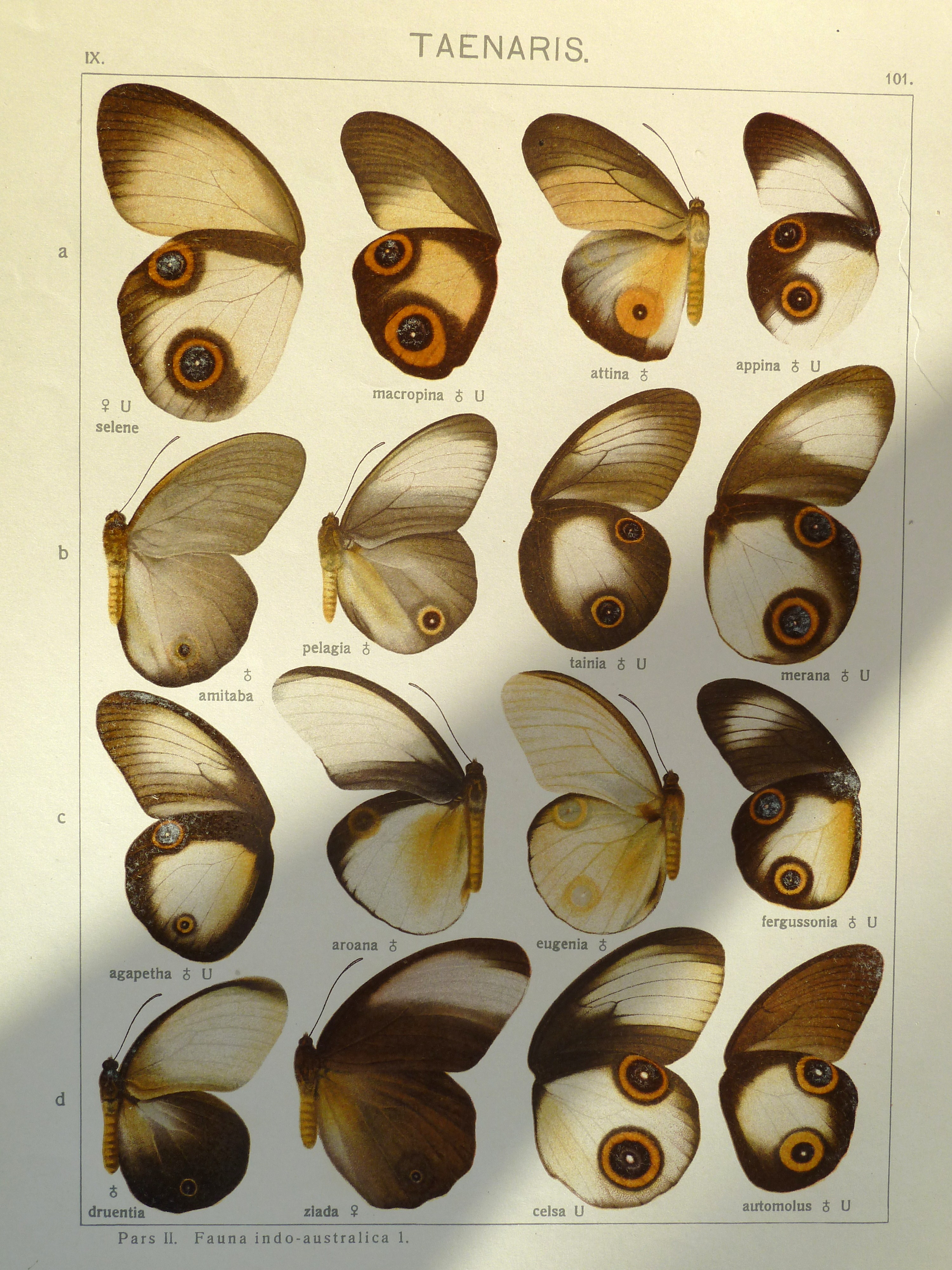
- Taenaris cyclops f. agapetha and f. eugenia in Adalbert Seitz's Die Großschmetterlinge der Erde

Scientific classification
- Domain: Eukaryota
- Kingdom: Animalia
- Phylum: Arthropoda
- Class: Insecta
- Order: Lepidoptera
- Family: Nymphalidae
- Genus: Taenaris
- Species: T. cyclops

Binomial name
- Taenaris cyclops (Staudinger, 1894)

Synonyms
- Tenaris cyclops Staudinger, 1894; Tenaris timesias agapethus Fruhstorfer, 1904; Taenaris cyclops f. agasta Stichel, 1906; Taenaris cyclops f. cyclopides Fruhstorfer, 1910; Taenaris cyclops f. eugenia Fruhstorfer, 1910; Taenaris catops interrupta Strand, 1911; Tenaris dioptrica ferdinandi Fruhstorfer, 1904; Tenaris verbeeki Fruhstorfer, 1904; Taenaris myops misolensis Rothschild, 1916; Taenaris kirschi occidentalis Rothschild, 1916; Tenaris cyclops acontius Brooks, 1944; Tenaris acontius Brooks, 1944; Taenaris kirschi interfaunus Rothschild, 1916

= Taenaris cyclops =

Species of butterfly

Taenaris cyclops is a butterfly in the family Nymphalidae. It was described by Otto Staudinger in 1894. It is found in New Guinea in the Australasian realm.

== Subspecies ==
- T. c. cyclops (eastern New Guinea)
- T. c. ferdinandi (Fruhstorfer, 1904) (German New Guinea)
- T. c. verbeeki (Fruhstorfer, 1904) (Papua - Milne Bay)
- T. c. misolensis Rothschild, 1916 (Misool)
- T. c. occidentalis Rothschild, 1916 (West Irian - Geelvink Bay)
- T. c. acontius (Brooks, 1944) (West Irian - South Geelvink Bay - Etna Bay)
- T. c. interfaunus Rothschild, 1916 (West Irian - Humboldt Bay)
