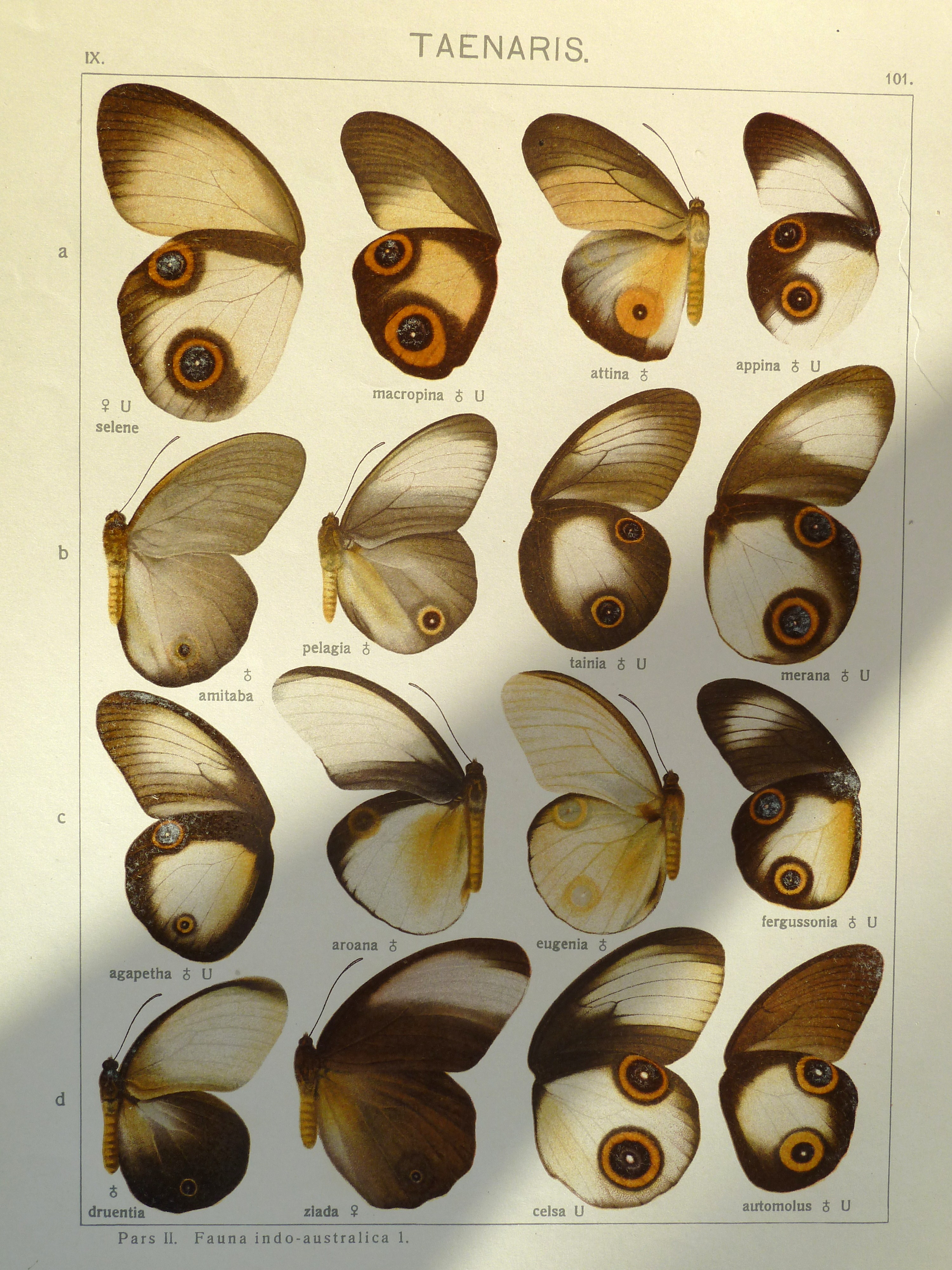
- Taenaris chionides aroana in Adalbert Seitz's Die Großschmetterlinge der Erde

Scientific classification
- Domain: Eukaryota
- Kingdom: Animalia
- Phylum: Arthropoda
- Class: Insecta
- Order: Lepidoptera
- Family: Nymphalidae
- Genus: Taenaris
- Species: T. chionides

Binomial name
- Taenaris chionides (Godman & Salvin, 1880)

Synonyms
- Tenaris chionides Godman & Salvin, 1880; Tenaris kubaryi Staudinger, 1894; Tenaris kubaryi aroana Fruhstorfer, 1901; Tanearis chionides kubaryi f. ambigua Stichel, 1906

= Taenaris chionides =

Species of butterfly

Taenaris chionides is a butterfly in the family Nymphalidae. It was described by Frederick DuCane Godman and Osbert Salvin in 1880. It is endemic to New Guinea in the Australasian realm.

== Subspecies ==
- T. c. chionides
- T. c. kubaryi Staudinger, 1894 (New Guinea - Huon Peninsula)
- T. c. aroana (Fruhstorfer, 1901) (New Guinea)
- T. c. ambigua Stichel, 1906 (New Guinea)
