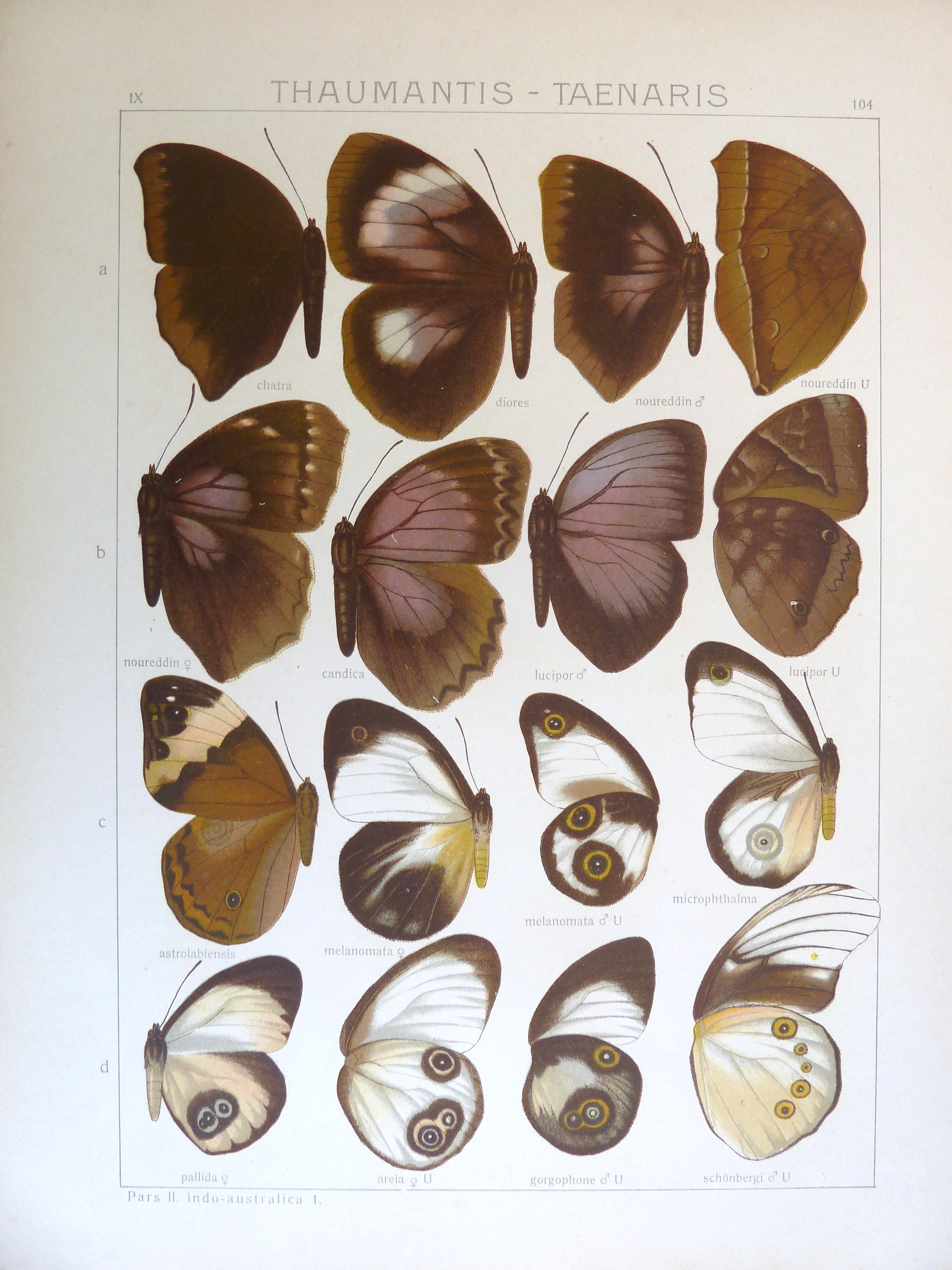
- Taenaris gorgo gorgophone in Seitz

Scientific classification
- Domain: Eukaryota
- Kingdom: Animalia
- Phylum: Arthropoda
- Class: Insecta
- Order: Lepidoptera
- Family: Nymphalidae
- Genus: Taenaris
- Species: T. gorgo

Binomial name
- Taenaris gorgo (Kirsch, 1877)

Synonyms
- Drusilla gorgo Kirsch, 1877

= Taenaris gorgo =

Species of butterfly

Taenaris gorgo is a butterfly in the family Nymphalidae. It was described by Theodor Franz Wilhelm Kirsch in 1877. It is endemic to New Guinea in the Australasian realm

== Subspecies ==
- T. g. gorgo (New Guinea, Salawati Island, Sorong)
- T. g. gorgophone Fruhstorfer, 1904 New Guinea (Humboldt Bay, Finschhafef)
- T. g. danalis Fruhstorfer, 1904 (Waigeu)
- T. g. mera Fruhstorfer, 1905 (New Guinea: Afrak, Wangaar River)
- T. g. ucina Brooks, 1944 (New Guinea: Snow Mountains, Eilanden River)
- T. g. yulei Bakker, 1942 (Papua: Aroa River)
- T. g. gorgias Brooks, 1950 (New Guinea)
