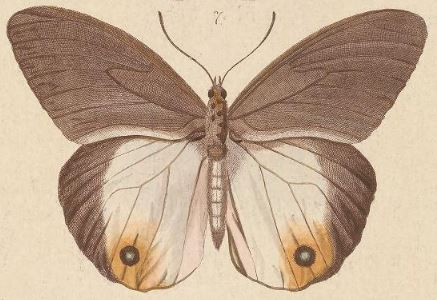

Scientific classification
- Domain: Eukaryota
- Kingdom: Animalia
- Phylum: Arthropoda
- Class: Insecta
- Order: Lepidoptera
- Family: Nymphalidae
- Genus: Taenaris
- Species: T. onolaus

Binomial name
- Taenaris onolaus (Kirsch, 1877)

Synonyms
- Tenaris onolaus Kirsch, 1877; Tenaris honrathi var. ida Honrath, 1889

= Taenaris onolaus =

Species of butterfly

Taenaris onolaus is a butterfly of the family Nymphalidae. It is found on New Guinea.

== Subspecies ==
- Taenaris onolaus onolaus (western West Irian, Mioswar Island)
- Taenaris onolaus ida Honrath, 1889 (eastern New Guinea: Huon Peninsula)
- Taenaris onolaus saturatior Fruhstorfer (southern and south-western Papua New Guinea)
- Taenaris onolaus shapur Brooks, 1944 (West Irian (Weyland Mountains, Wandammen Mountains)
