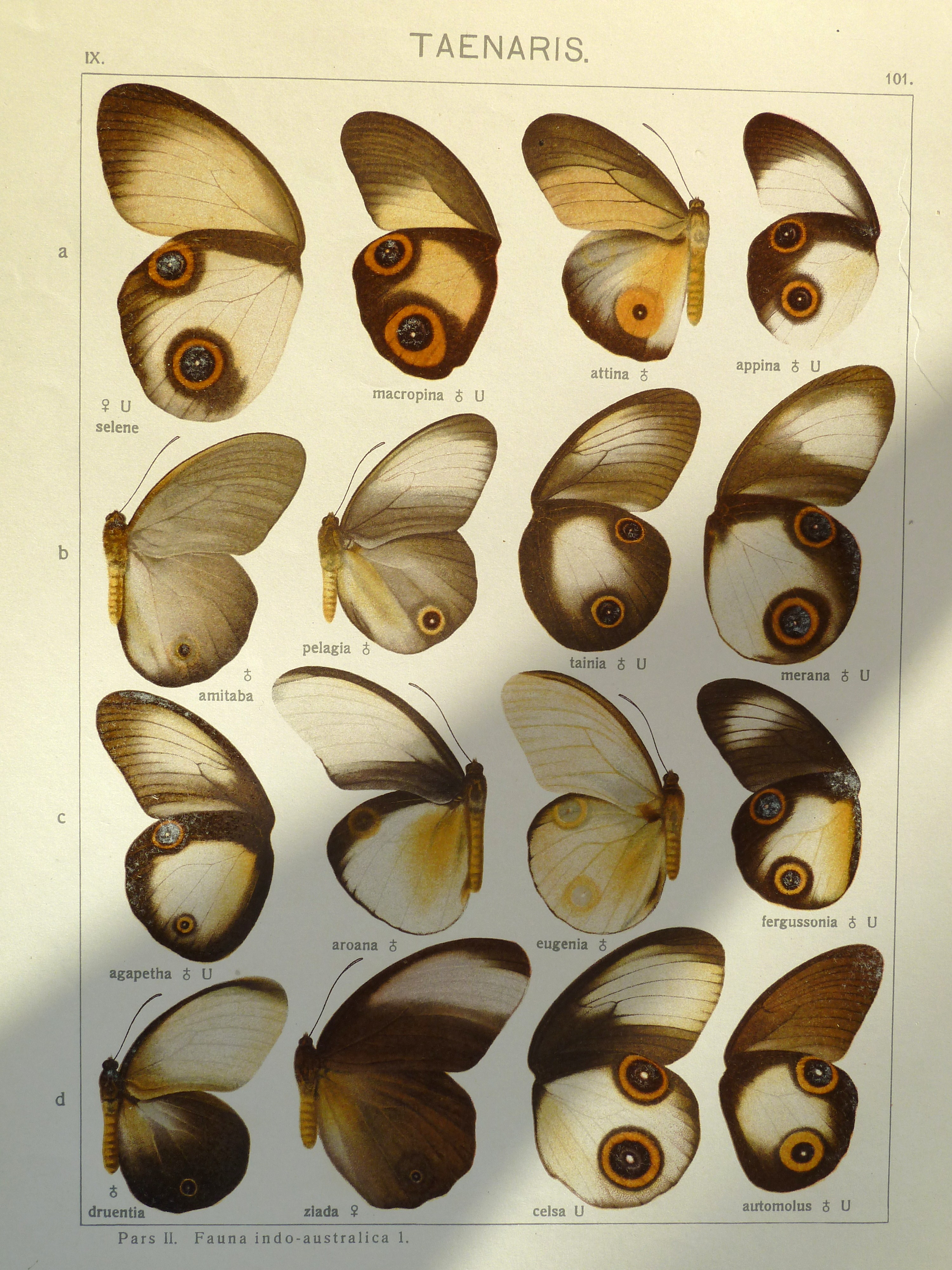
- From Adalbert Seitz's Die Großschmetterlinge der Erde

Scientific classification
- Domain: Eukaryota
- Kingdom: Animalia
- Phylum: Arthropoda
- Class: Insecta
- Order: Lepidoptera
- Family: Nymphalidae
- Genus: Taenaris
- Species: T. selene

Binomial name
- Taenaris selene (Westwood, 1851)

Synonyms
- Drusilla selene Westwood, 1851; Taenaris buruensis Forbes, 1883; Tenaris macrops gigas Staudinger, 1888; Taenaris selene gigas f. pseudomacrops Rothschild, 1915; Tenaris sura Brooks, 1944

= Taenaris selene =

Species of butterfly

Taenaris selene is a butterfly in the family Nymphalidae. It was described by John Obadiah Westwood in 1851. It is found in the Australasian realm.

== Subspecies ==
- T. s. selene (Buru, Moluccas)
- T. s. gigas Staudinger, 1888 (Serang)
- T. s. sura Brooks, 1944 (Geisser Island)
