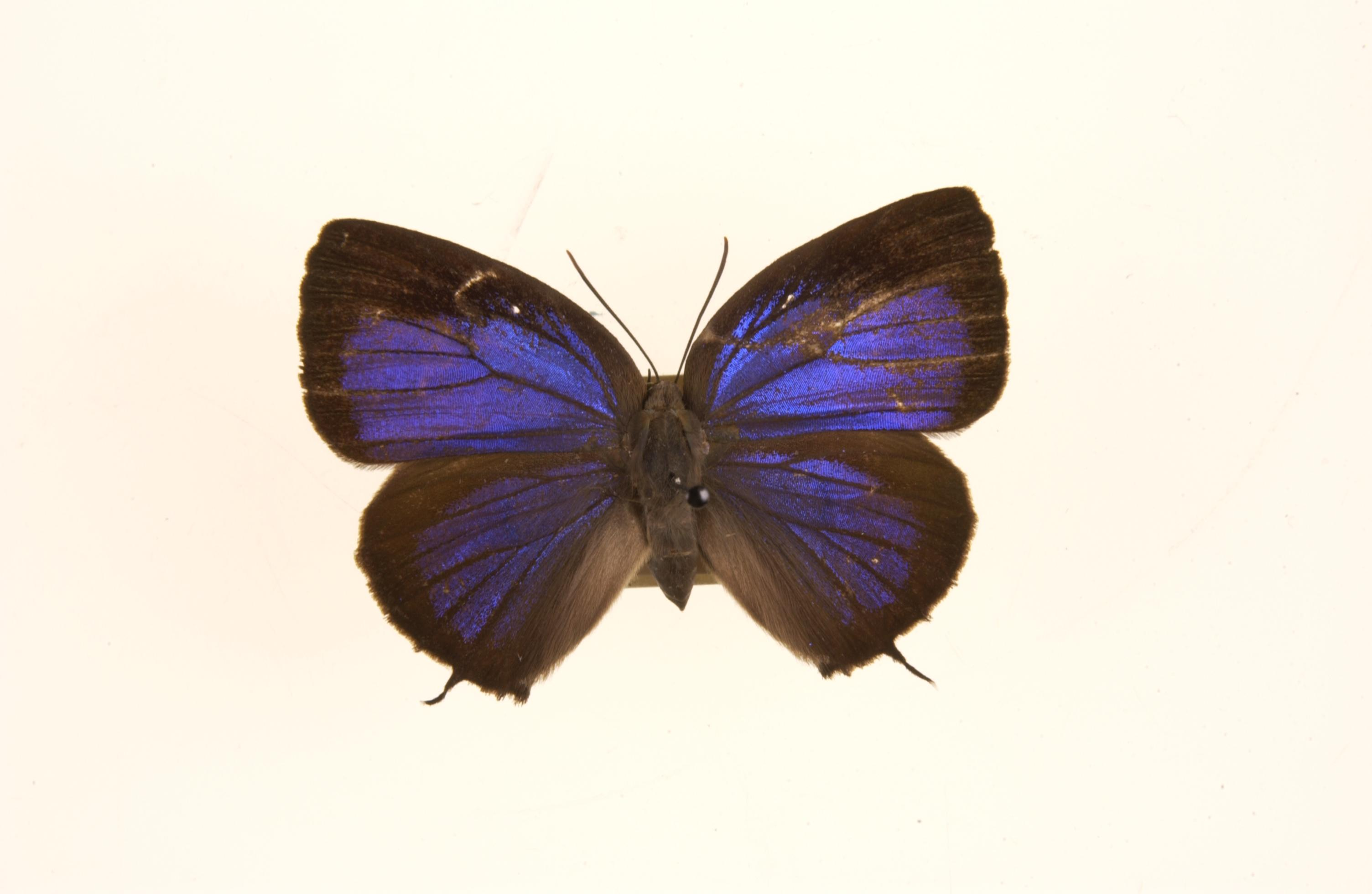
- A. h. basiviridis Female

Scientific classification
- Kingdom: Animalia
- Phylum: Arthropoda
- Clade: Pancrustacea
- Class: Insecta
- Order: Lepidoptera
- Family: Lycaenidae
- Genus: Arhopala
- Species: A. horsfieldi

Binomial name
- Arhopala horsfieldi (Pagenstecher, 1890)

Synonyms
- Amblypodia horsfieldi Pagenstecher, 1890; Narathura horsfieldi (Pagenstecher, 1890); Arhopala eurysthenes Fruhstorfer, 1914; Arhopala basiviridis de Nicéville, 1891

= Arhopala horsfieldi =

Species of butterfly

Arhopala horsfieldi is a butterfly of the family Lycaenidae. It is found in Southeast Asia (see subspecies section).

== Description ==
At once discernible from the preceding [related] forms by the broad, proximally irregularly radiating blackish-brown margin of the forewing, being also exhibited in the male the wings of which show a somewhat darker green than the forms of aurea which they resemble somewhat on the under surface excepting the differences in the marking which are to be seen from our figures. The female is like the male but the golden green colour above is replaced by a violettish blue, and the total colouring beneath is somewhat lighter.

== Subspecies ==
- A. h. horsfieldi (Java)
- A. h. eurysthenes (southern Burma, Mergui, southern Thailand, Langkawi)
- A. h. basiviridis (Peninsular Malaya, Sumatra, Bangka, Borneo) - a very regular and clear marking beneath, the light-edged spots and bands being almost of the groundcolour.
- A. h. serpa (Nias)
- A. h. palawanica (Palawan)

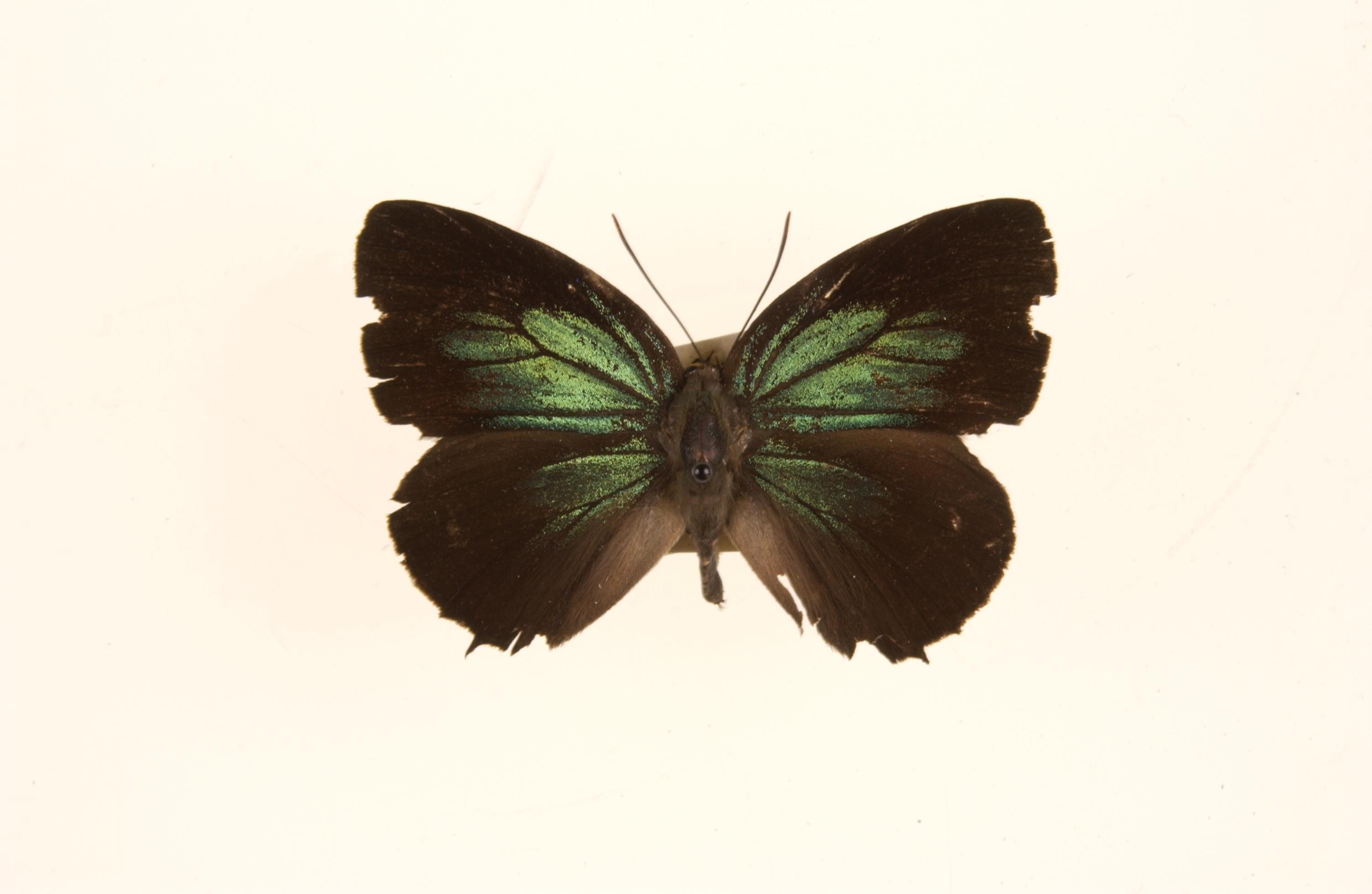
A. h. basiviridis Male

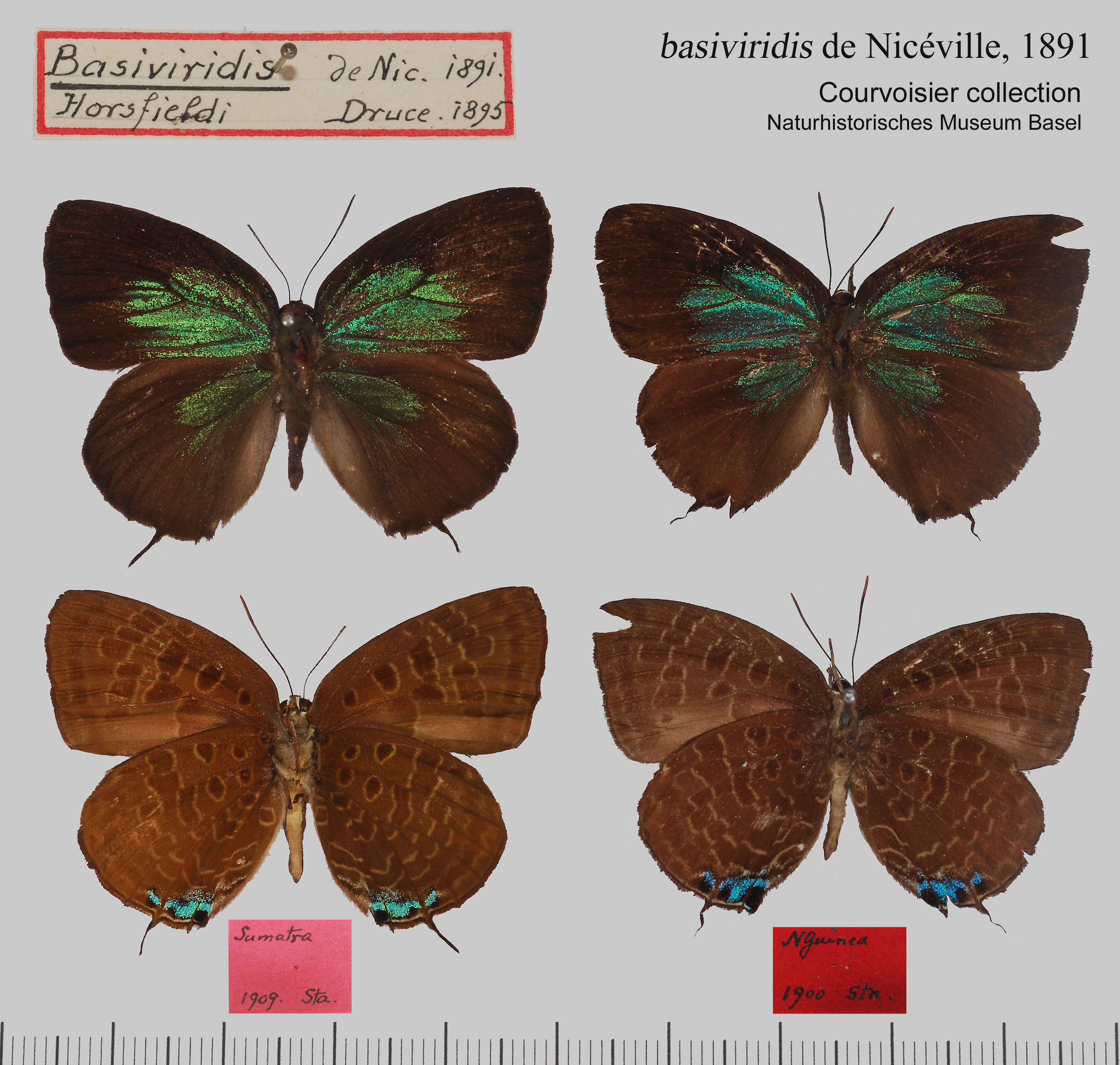
A. h. basiviridis Courvoisier Collection, Basel

== Etymology ==
The name honours Thomas Horsfield.
