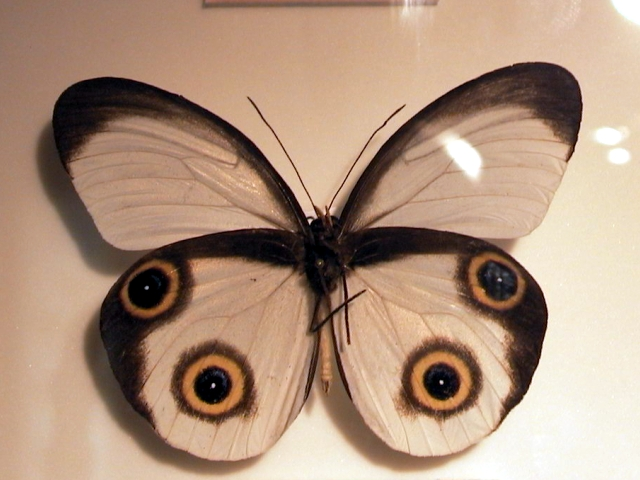

Scientific classification
- Kingdom: Animalia
- Phylum: Arthropoda
- Clade: Pancrustacea
- Class: Insecta
- Order: Lepidoptera
- Family: Nymphalidae
- Genus: Taenaris
- Species: T. catops

Binomial name
- Taenaris catops Westwood, 1851

= Taenaris catops =

Species of butterfly

Taenaris catops, the silky owl, is a butterfly of the family Nymphalidae. It is found in New Guinea and surrounding islands.

The wingspan is 75–95 mm.

The larvae feed on Cordyline terminalis, Musa species, Areca catechu, and Caryota rumphiana.

== Life cycle ==
It takes the Taenaris catops 130 days to complete its life cycle.

== Habitat ==
The habitat of the Teanaris catops is freshwater swamps, secondary coastal lowlands, and forests
