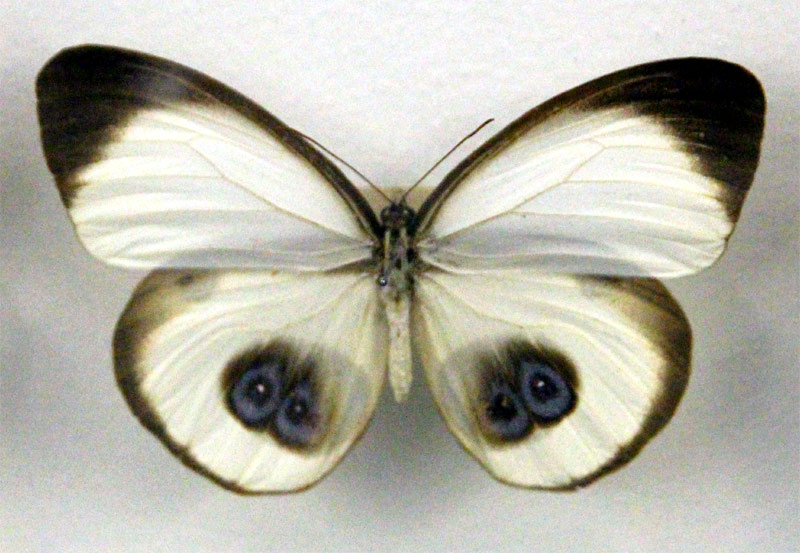

Scientific classification
- Kingdom: Animalia
- Phylum: Arthropoda
- Clade: Pancrustacea
- Class: Insecta
- Order: Lepidoptera
- Family: Nymphalidae
- Genus: Taenaris
- Species: T. bioculatus

Binomial name
- Taenaris bioculatus (Guérin-Méneville, [1830])

Synonyms
- Morpho bioculatus Guérin-Méneville, [1830]; Taenaris bioculatus pallida Fruhstorfer, 1905; indra Boisduval, 1832; pallus Fruhstorfer, 1905

= Taenaris bioculatus =

Species of butterfly

Taenaris bioculatus is a butterfly in the family Nymphalidae. It was described by Félix Édouard Guérin-Méneville in 1830. It is endemic to New Guinea in the Australasian realm

== Subspecies ==
- T. b. bioculatus (Waigeo, Gebe, Salawati, Northwest New Guinea)
- T. b. albius Brooks, 1950 (New Guinea: Arfak Mountains, Weyland Mountains, Kunupi)
- T. b. grisescens Rothschild, 1915 (New Guinea: Snow Mountains)
- T. b. avarea Fruhstorfer, 1916 (Southwest New Guinea)
- T. b. charondas Fruhstorfer, 1911 (New Guinea: Lower Aroa River)
- T. b. charon Staudinger, 1887 (New Guinea: Fischhafen)
- T. b. cameronensis Rothschild, 1916 (New Guinea: Owen Stanley Range)
