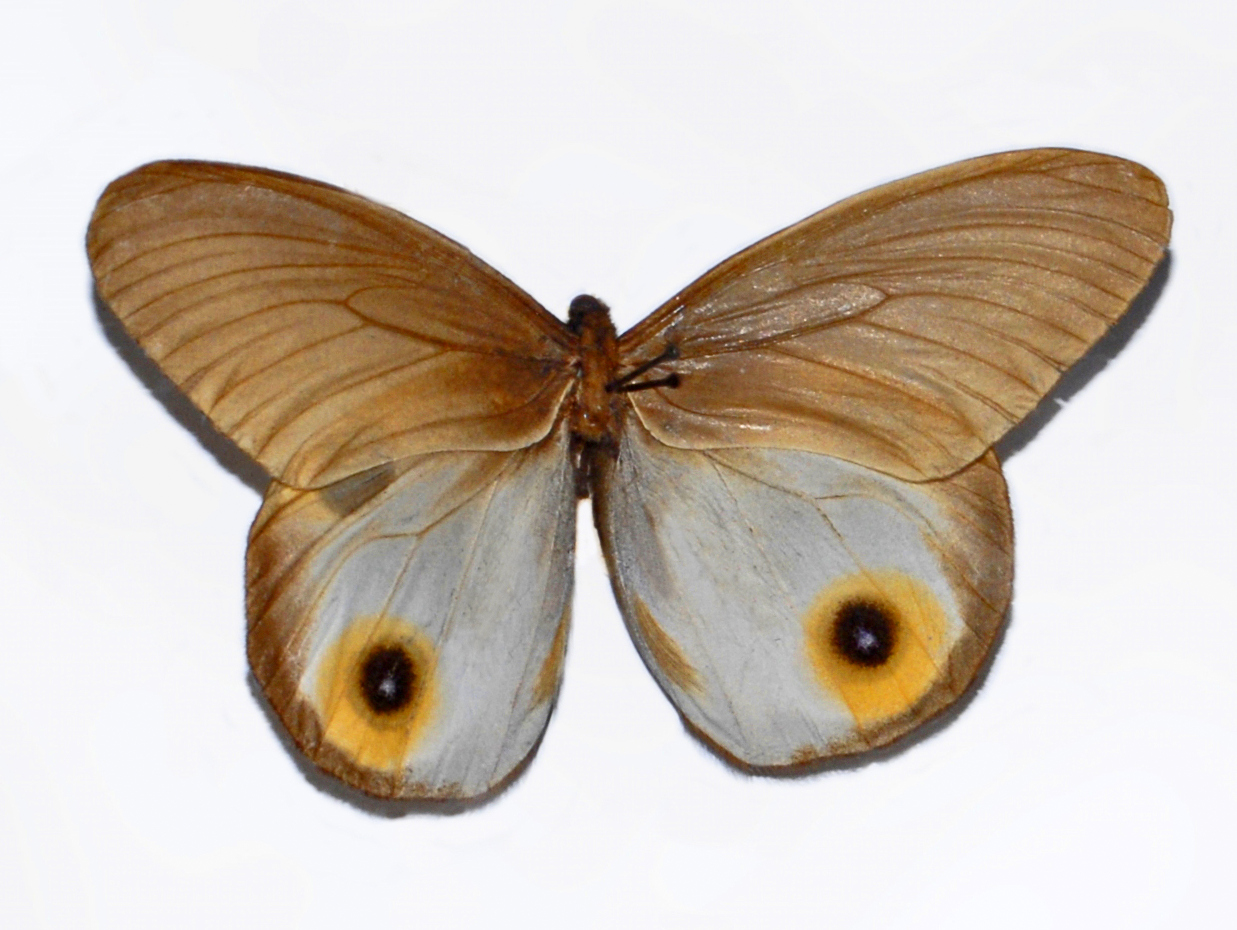
- Mounted specimen, upperside

Conservation status
- Least Concern (IUCN 3.1)

Scientific classification
- Domain: Eukaryota
- Kingdom: Animalia
- Phylum: Arthropoda
- Class: Insecta
- Order: Lepidoptera
- Family: Nymphalidae
- Genus: Taenaris
- Species: T. horsfieldii

Binomial name
- Taenaris horsfieldii (Swainson, [1820])

Synonyms
- Drusilla horsfieldii Swainson, [1820]; Taenaris horsfieldi; Tenaris birchi Distant, 1883

= Taenaris horsfieldii =

Species of butterfly

Taenaris horsfieldii, the big eyed jungle lady or silky owl, is a butterfly of the family Nymphalidae.

== Subspecies ==
- Taenaris horsfieldii horsfieldi (Java)
- Taenaris horsfieldii birchi Distant, 1883 (Peninsular Malaya: Johore)
- Taenaris horsfieldii occulta Grose-Smith, 1889 (Borneo)
- Taenaris horsfieldii plateni Staudinger, 1889 (Palawan)

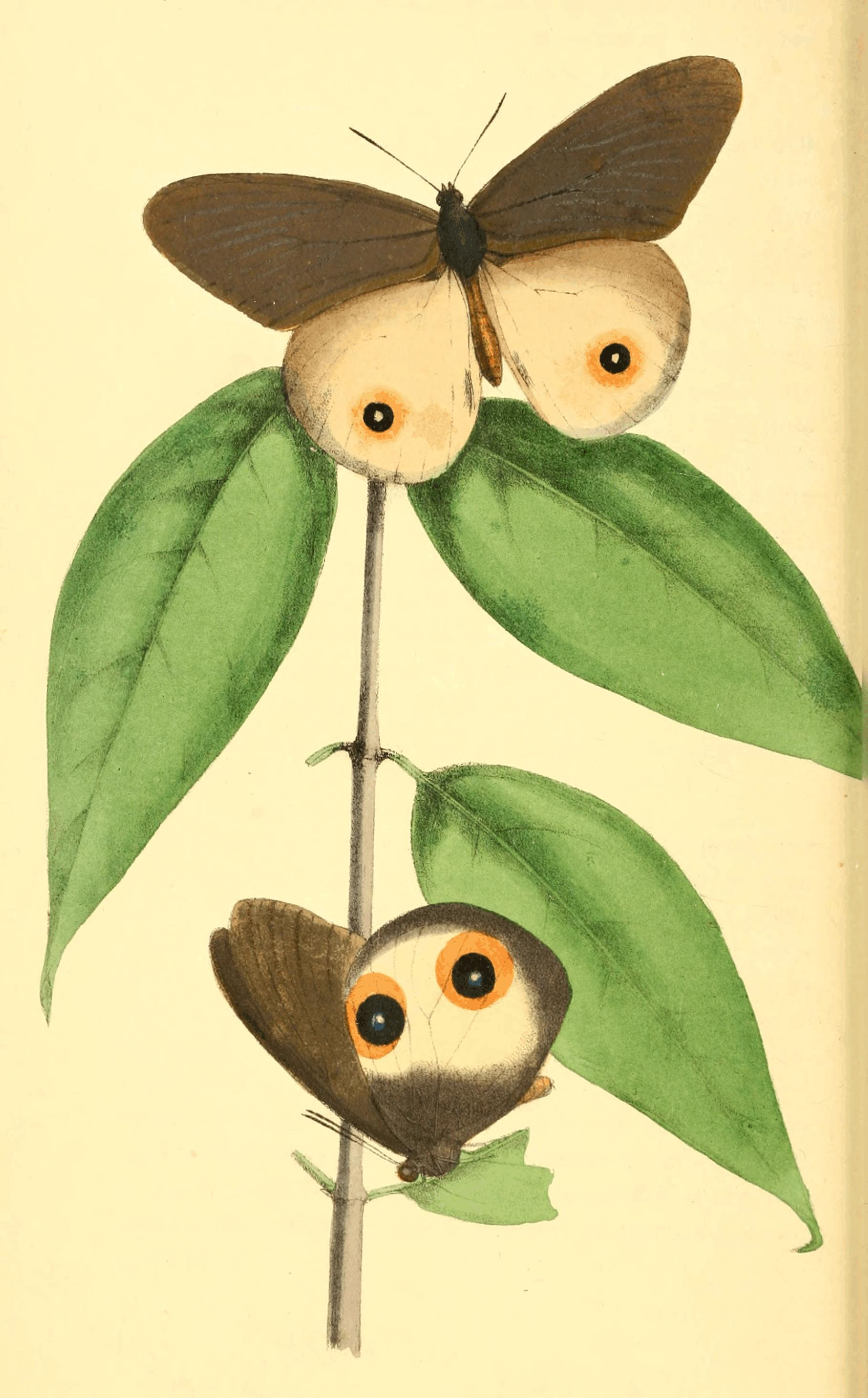
Illustration of Taenaris horsfieldii

== Description ==
Taenaris horsfieldii has a wingspan of about 70 millimetres (2.8 in). Upperside of forewings is pale fuscous, while hindwings are greyish white, with a large ocellated spot, of which the centre is blackish with a pale central eye, broadly surrounded with ochraceous. Underside of the forewings is darker towards base and hindwings have a larger and brighter ocellated spot.

== Distribution and habitat ==
This species can be found on Java, Peninsular Malaysia, Borneo and the Philippines (Palawan). It is a species of both primary and secondary forest.
