= Enispe (disambiguation) =

Enispe may refer to:

- Enispe (Ενίσπη), an ancient city in Arcadia, Greece
- Enispe (butterfly), a butterfly genus from Southeast Asia including:
  - Enispe cycnus, the blue caliph
  - Enispe euthymius, the red caliph
  - Enispe intermedia
