= E. intermedia =

E. intermedia may refer to:

- Enispe intermedia, a butterfly species found in South Asia
- Ephedra intermedia, a plant species native to Southwest and Central Asia
- Erebus intermedia, a moth species found in Asia
- Eumorpha intermedia, the intermediate sphinx, a moth species found in North Carolina, Florida, Mississippi, Louisiana and South Texas
- Erebus intermedia, a sedge species native to Eastern North America; commonly known as Matted Spikerush.

== Synonyms ==
- Epipactis intermedia, a synonym for Epipactis microphylla, the small-leaved helleborine, an orchid species
- Eucalyptus intermedia, a synonym for Corymbia intermedia, the pink bloodwood, a plant species native to Queensland and New South Wales

== See also ==
- Intermedia (disambiguation)
