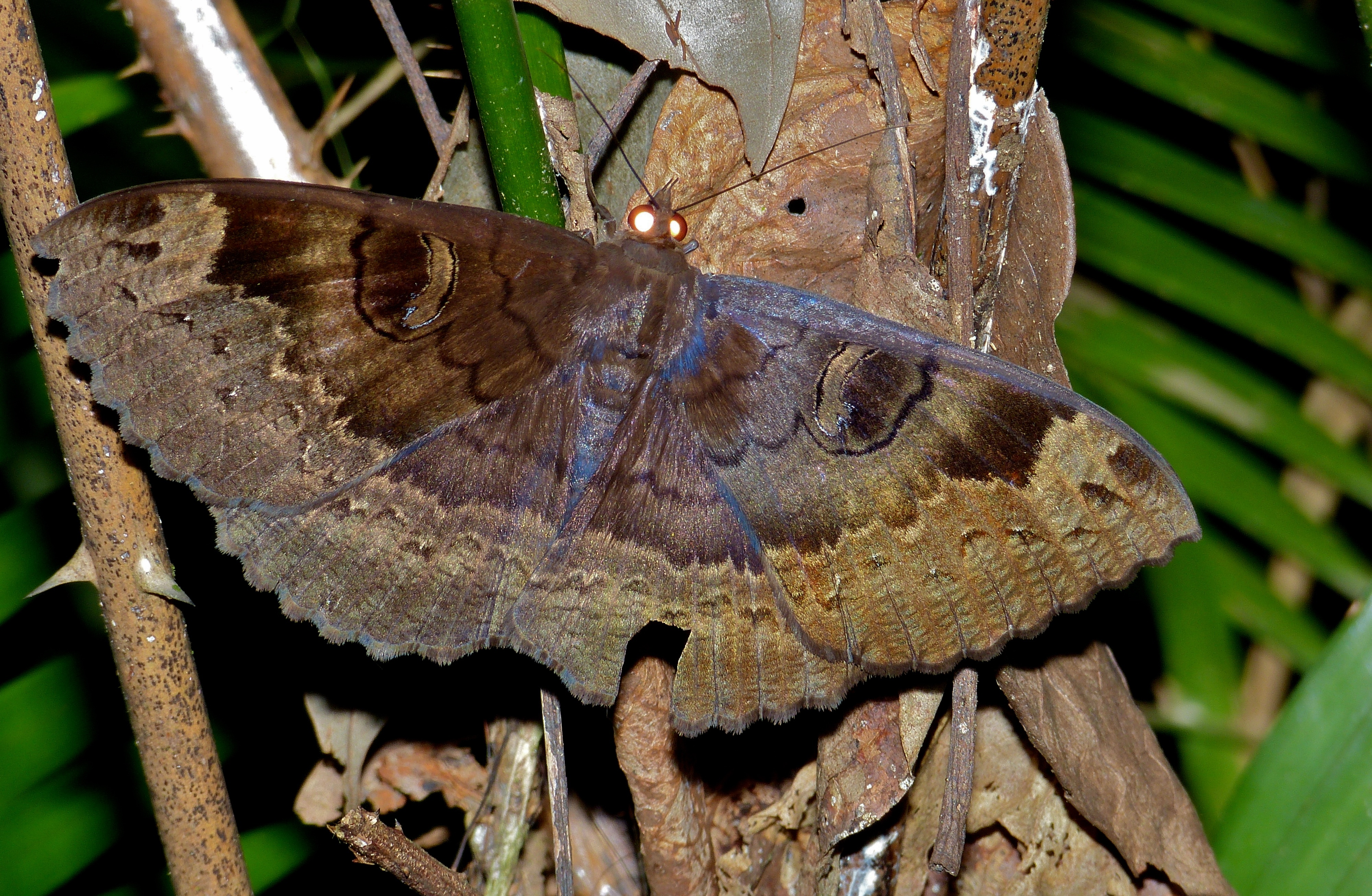

Scientific classification
- Kingdom: Animalia
- Phylum: Arthropoda
- Class: Insecta
- Order: Lepidoptera
- Superfamily: Noctuoidea
- Family: Erebidae
- Genus: Erebus
- Species: E. caprimulgus

Binomial name
- Erebus caprimulgus (Fabricius, 1781)

Synonyms
- Noctua caprimulgus Fabricius, 1781; Nyctipao exterior Walker, 1858; Nyctipao obliterans Walker, 1858; Nyctipao truncata Moore, 1877; Nyctipao orion Hampson, 1913; Erebus exterior (Walker, 1858); Erebus obliterans (Walker, 1858); Erebus truncata (Moore, 1877); Erebus orion (Hampson, 1913)

= Erebus caprimulgus =

Species of moth

Erebus caprimulgus is a moth of the family Erebidae. It is found from the Oriental Region of India, Sri Lanka, Myanmar to Peninsular Malaysia, Sumatra and Borneo. It also occurs in Taiwan.

== Description ==
The wingspan is about 90–104 mm. The species shows sexual dimorphism. Male with vein 3 running to the functional apex of hindwing. The costal fold is obsolete, and the granular patch is small. Male with veins 4 to 8 of hindwings moderately developed in the aborted costal area. Similar to Erebus hieroglyphica, differs from having large whorl of forewing and absence of yellow sub-apical bar. Abdomen with tufts of orange hair in anal segment round claspers.

Female is somewhat similar to male, but with indistinct antemedial line to forewing and line from the whorl to inner margin. Hindwings with traces of sinuous medial line. In some morphs, there is a broad sinuous postmedial line on both wings which angled near costa of for wing. The outer area suffused with grey or sometimes mostly white on hindwing. Another morph is brownish, where the wings suffused black as far as postmedial line. Ventral side with irregular postmedial series of white posts to both wings.

== Subspecies ==
- Erebus caprimulgus caprimulgus
- Erebus caprimulgus orion (Hampson, 1913) (Borneo)
