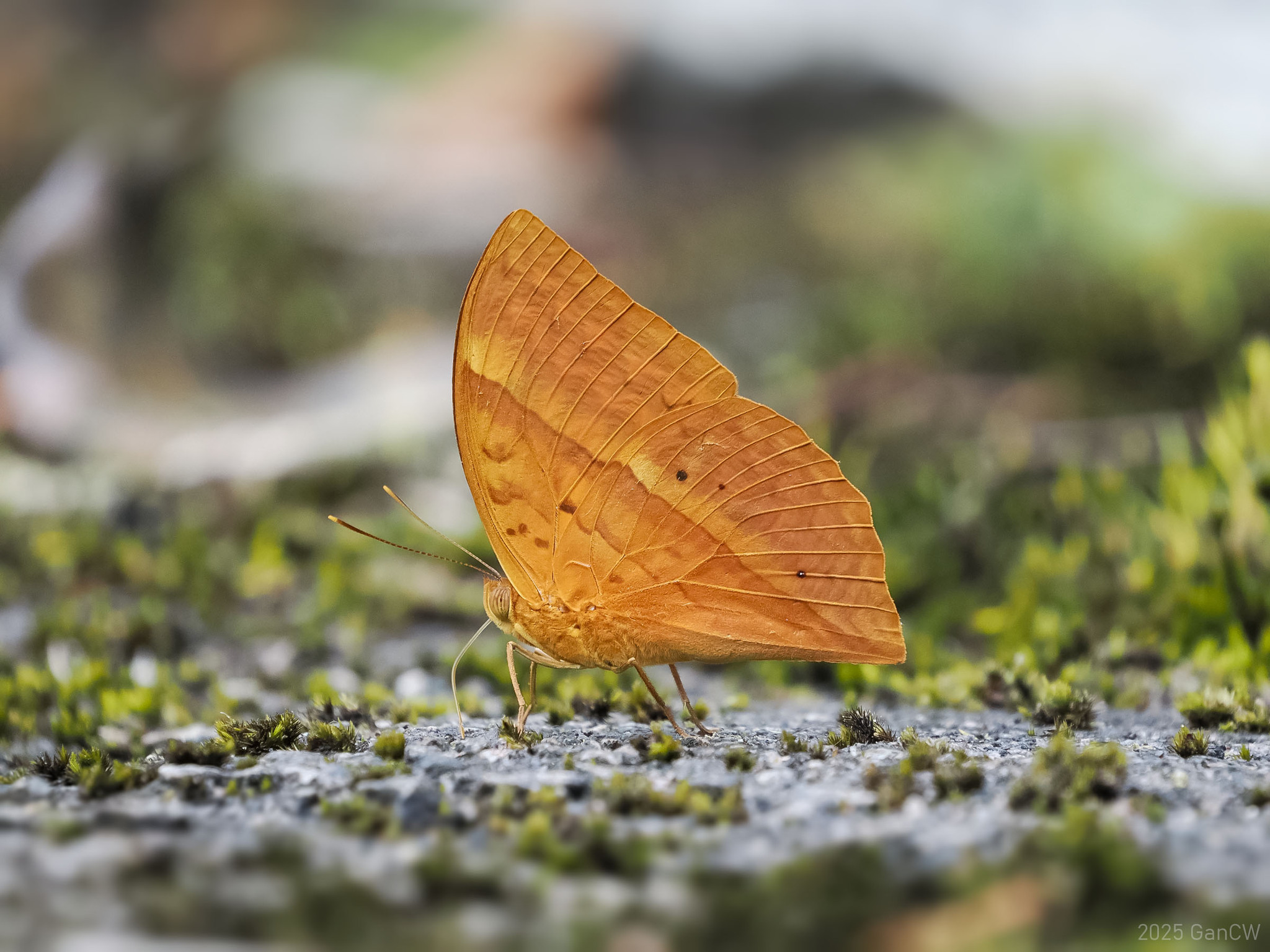

Scientific classification
- Kingdom: Animalia
- Phylum: Arthropoda
- Clade: Pancrustacea
- Class: Insecta
- Order: Lepidoptera
- Family: Nymphalidae
- Genus: Enispe
- Species: E. duranius

Binomial name
- Enispe duranius Fruhstorfer, 1911

= Enispe duranius =

Species of butterfly

Enispe duranius, also known as the Malay red caliph, is a butterfly in the family Nymphalidae. It is found from Manipur in India to the Malay Peninsula. It was described by Hans Fruhstorfer in 1911. This species is monotypic.

== Description ==
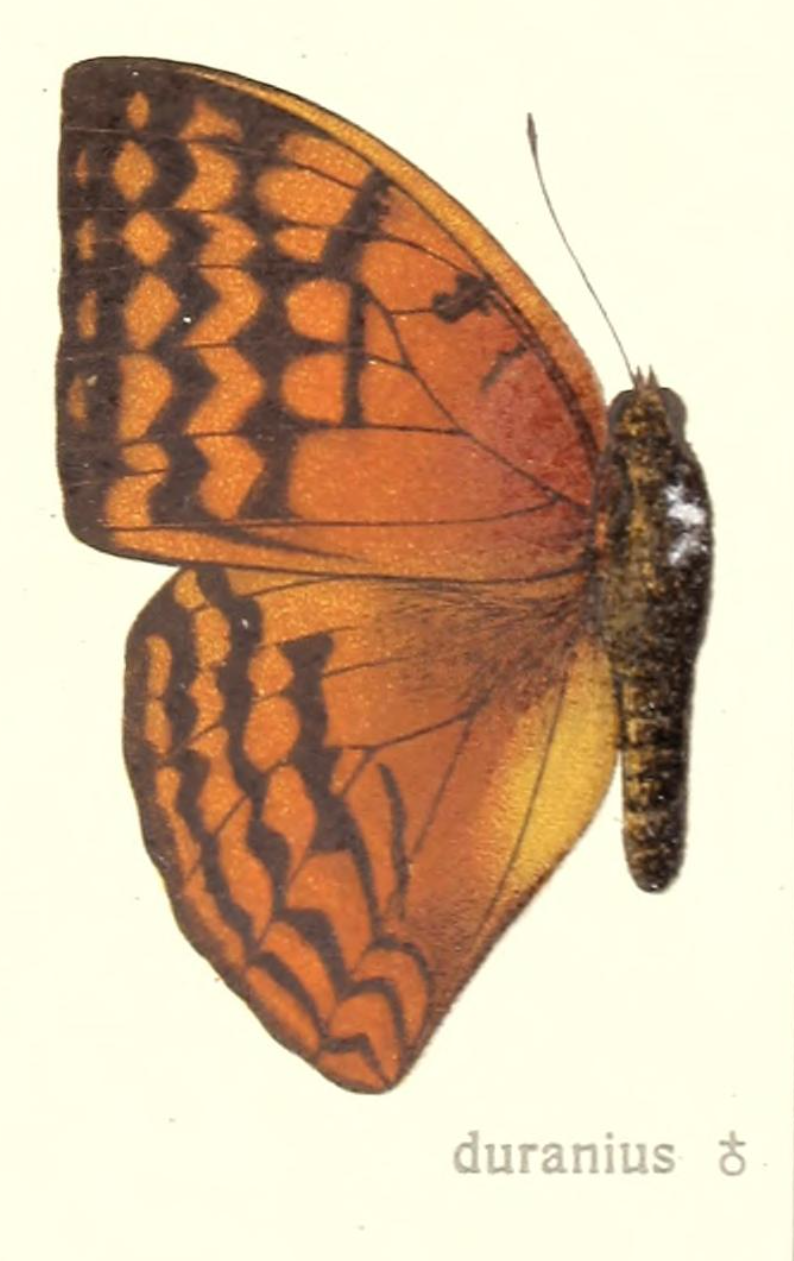
Upperside

This species is similar to Enispe euthymius, but the black bands and zigzag lines are richer on the upperside and the ground colour is paler on the underside.

The ocelli on the underside hindwing are stunted, and the lowest ocellus often has a white core in the middle.
