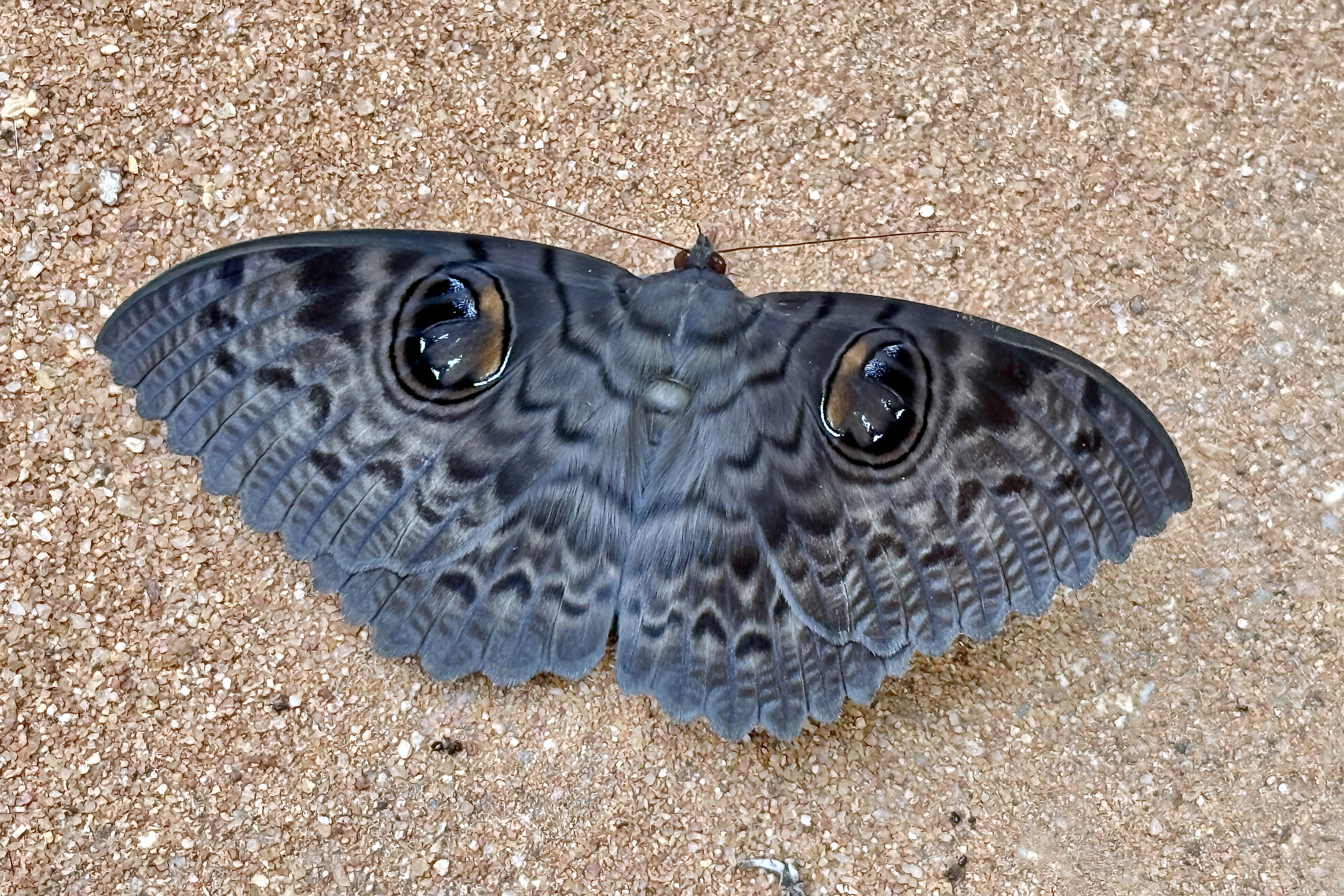

Scientific classification
- Kingdom: Animalia
- Phylum: Arthropoda
- Class: Insecta
- Order: Lepidoptera
- Superfamily: Noctuoidea
- Family: Erebidae
- Genus: Erebus
- Species: E. walkeri

Binomial name
- Erebus walkeri (Butler, 1875)

Synonyms
- Patula walkeri Butler, 1875; Nyctipao valceri Hampson, 1913

= Erebus walkeri =

Species of moth

Erebus walkeri is a moth of the family Erebidae. It is found in Angola, the Comoros, the Democratic Republic of Congo, Ghana, Kenya, La Réunion, Madagascar, Malawi, Mauritius, Mozambique, Nigeria, Rwanda, the Seychelles, South Africa (KwaZulu-Natal), São Tomé & Principe, Tanzania, Gambia, Uganda, Zambia and Zimbabwe.
