= Erebus candidii =

Scientific classification
- Kingdom: Animalia
- Phylum: Arthropoda
- Class: Insecta
- Order: Lepidoptera
- Superfamily: Noctuoidea
- Family: Erebidae
- Genus: Erebus
- Species: E. candidii

Binomial name
- Erebus candidii (Strand, 1920)

Synonyms
- Nyctipao candidii Strand, 1920

Species of moth

Erebus candidii is a moth of the family Erebidae. It is found in Taiwan.
