= Erebus mirans =

Scientific classification
- Kingdom: Animalia
- Phylum: Arthropoda
- Clade: Pancrustacea
- Class: Insecta
- Order: Lepidoptera
- Superfamily: Noctuoidea
- Family: Erebidae
- Genus: Erebus
- Species: E. mirans

Binomial name
- Erebus mirans Prout, 1932

Species of moth

Erebus mirans is a moth of the family Erebidae. It is found in Thailand.
