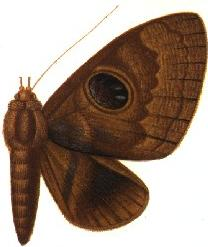

Scientific classification
- Kingdom: Animalia
- Phylum: Arthropoda
- Class: Insecta
- Order: Lepidoptera
- Superfamily: Noctuoidea
- Family: Erebidae
- Genus: Erebus
- Species: E. aerosa

Binomial name
- Erebus aerosa (C. Swinhoe, 1900)

Synonyms
- Argiva aerosa C. Swinhoe, 1900; Nyctipao aerosa; Erebus aerosus

= Erebus aerosa =

Species of moth

Erebus aerosa is a moth of the family Erebidae first described by Charles Swinhoe in 1900. It is found in Indonesia.
