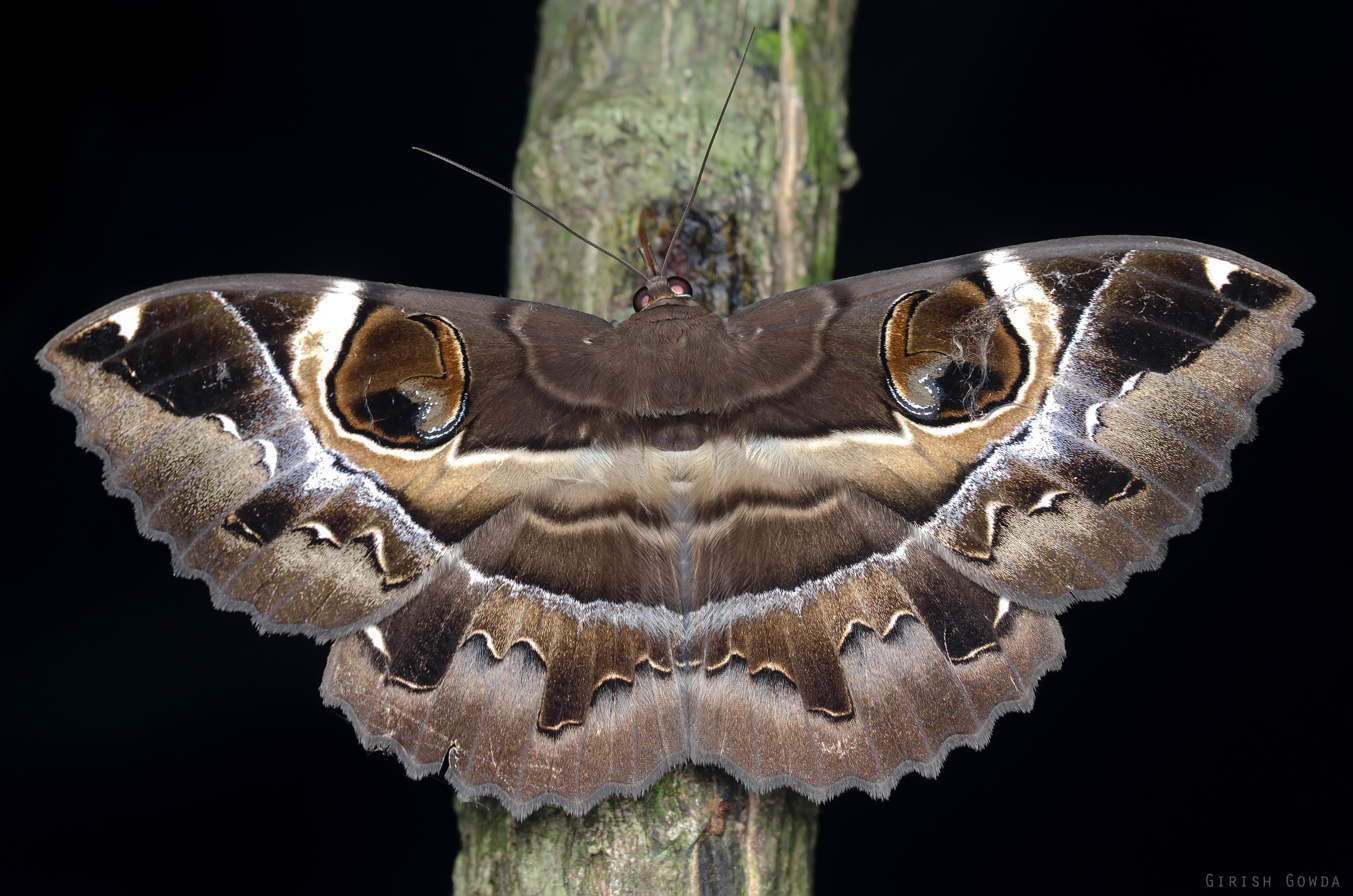

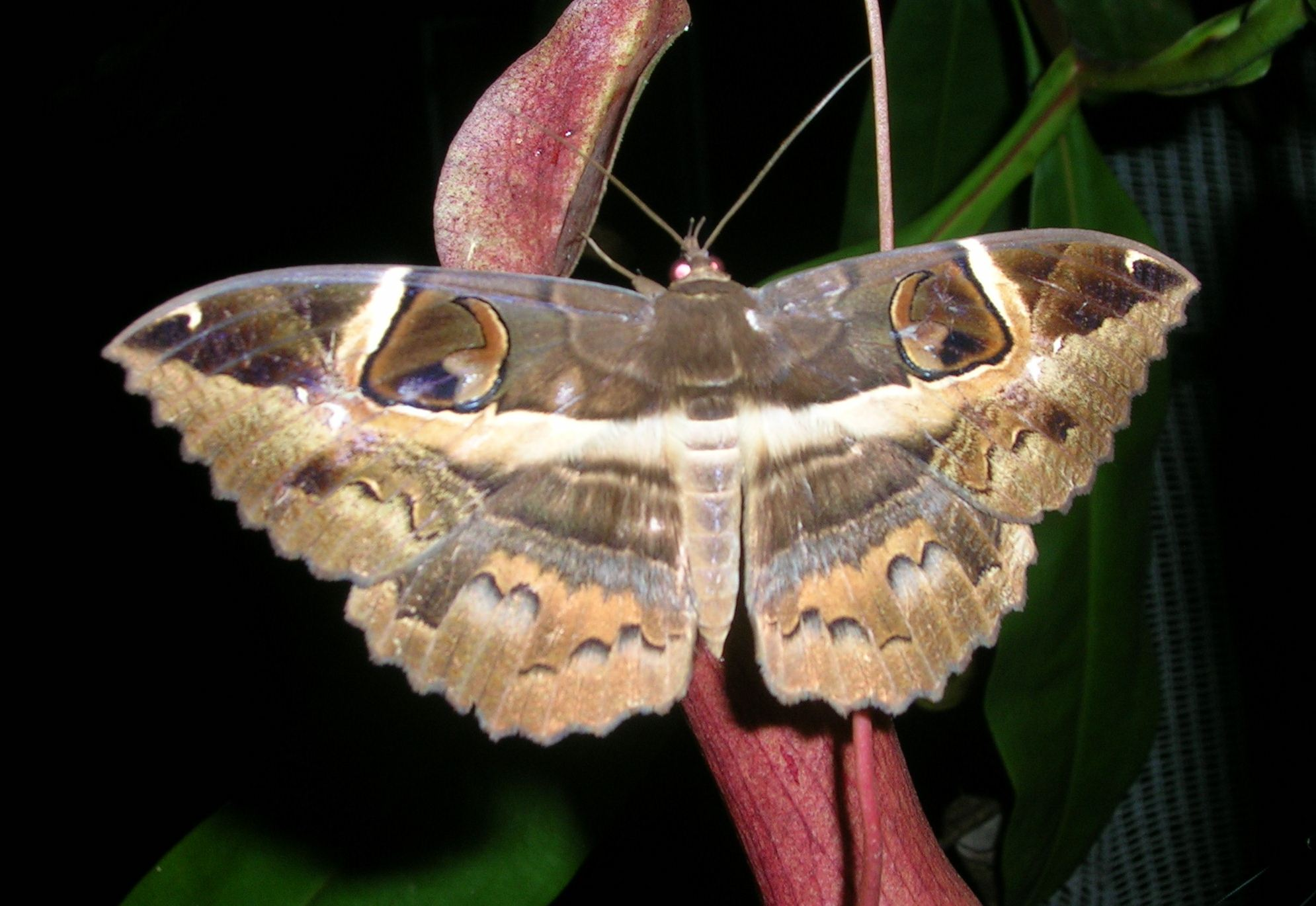

Scientific classification
- Kingdom: Animalia
- Phylum: Arthropoda
- Clade: Pancrustacea
- Class: Insecta
- Order: Lepidoptera
- Superfamily: Noctuoidea
- Family: Erebidae
- Genus: Erebus
- Species: E. ephesperis

Binomial name
- Erebus ephesperis (Hübner, 1827)

Synonyms
- Nyctipao ephesperis Hübner, 1827; Erebus laetitia (Butler, 1878); Erebus malanga Swinhoe, 1918; Erebus niasana Swinhoe, 1918

= Erebus ephesperis =

Species of moth

Erebus ephesperis is a species of moth in the family Erebidae first described by Jacob Hübner in 1827. It is found in Asia, including Pakistan, India, Japan, the Korean Peninsula, China, Singapore, Taiwan, Borneo and Casas Altas.

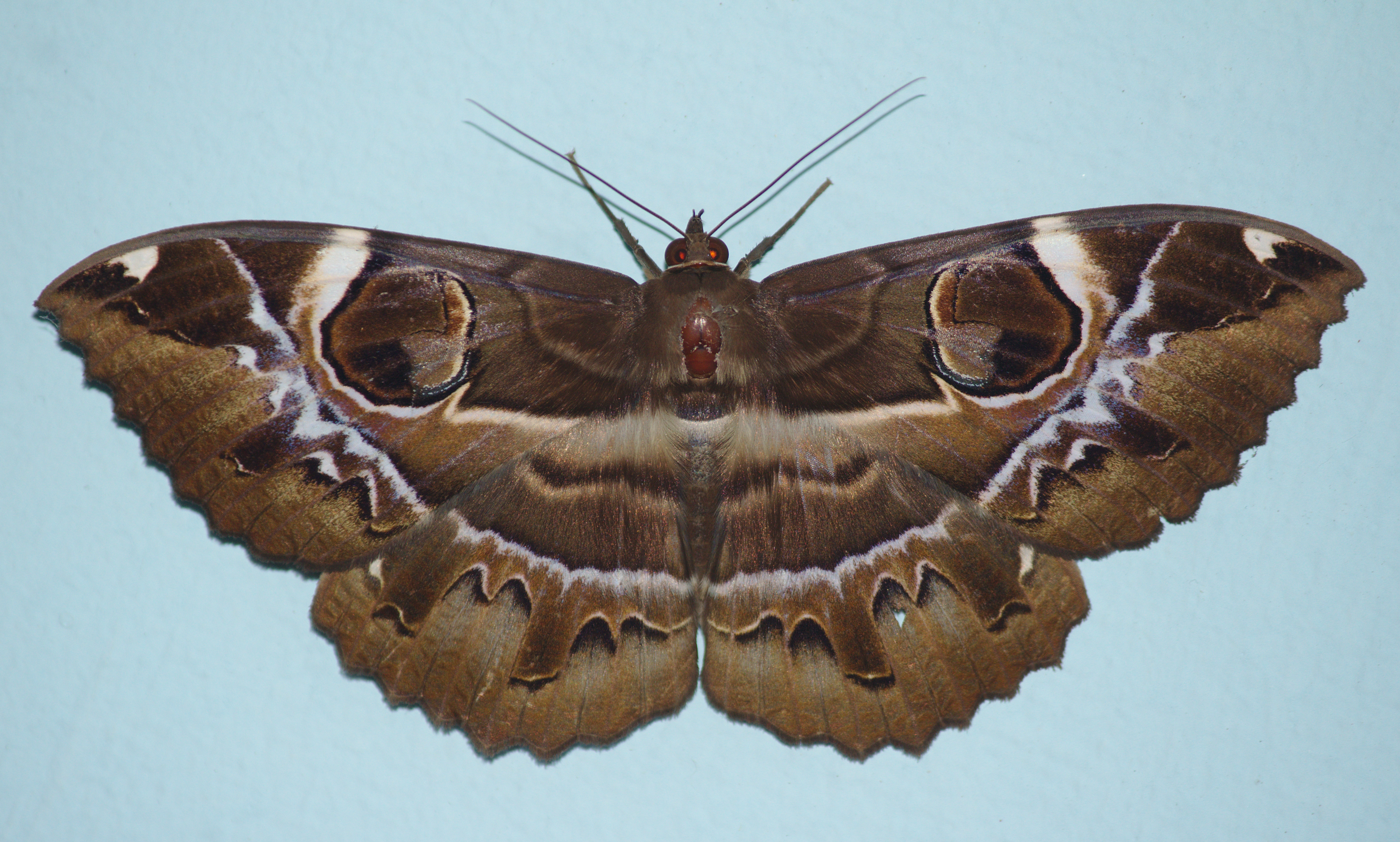
At Kanjirappally in Kerala, India
