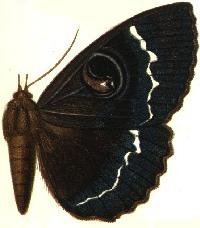

Scientific classification
- Kingdom: Animalia
- Phylum: Arthropoda
- Class: Insecta
- Order: Lepidoptera
- Superfamily: Noctuoidea
- Family: Erebidae
- Genus: Erebus
- Species: E. superba

Binomial name
- Erebus superba (C. Swinhoe, 1908)

Synonyms
- Nyctipao superba C. Swinhoe, 1908; Erebus superbus (C. Swinhoe, 1908)

= Erebus superba =

Species of moth of the family Eribidae

Erebus superba is a moth of the family Erebidae first described by Charles Swinhoe in 1908. It is found in the Indian state of Meghalaya and in Nepal.
