= Erebus atavistis =

Scientific classification
- Kingdom: Animalia
- Phylum: Arthropoda
- Class: Insecta
- Order: Lepidoptera
- Superfamily: Noctuoidea
- Family: Erebidae
- Genus: Erebus
- Species: E. atavistis

Binomial name
- Erebus atavistis (Hampson, 1913)

Synonyms
- Nyctipao atavistis Hampson, 1913

Species of moth

Erebus atavistis is a moth of the family Erebidae. It is found in the Republic of Congo, Gabon, South Africa, Tanzania, Uganda and Zimbabwe.
