= Erebus maurus =

Scientific classification
- Kingdom: Animalia
- Phylum: Arthropoda
- Class: Insecta
- Order: Lepidoptera
- Superfamily: Noctuoidea
- Family: Erebidae
- Genus: Erebus
- Species: E. maurus

Binomial name
- Erebus maurus (Gaede, 1917)

Synonyms
- Nyctipao maurus Gaede, 1917

Species of moth

Erebus maurus is a moth of the family Erebidae. It is found in Indonesia (Wetar).
