= Erebus glaucopis =

Scientific classification
- Kingdom: Animalia
- Phylum: Arthropoda
- Class: Insecta
- Order: Lepidoptera
- Superfamily: Noctuoidea
- Family: Erebidae
- Genus: Erebus
- Species: E. glaucopis

Binomial name
- Erebus glaucopis (Walker, 1858)

Synonyms
- Nyctipao glaucopis Walker, 1858; Nyctipao prunosus Moore, 1883

Species of moth

Erebus glaucopis, the Himalayan blue owl-moth is a moth of the family Erebidae. It is found in Bangladesh, the north-western Himalayas, China, Nepal and Thailand.
