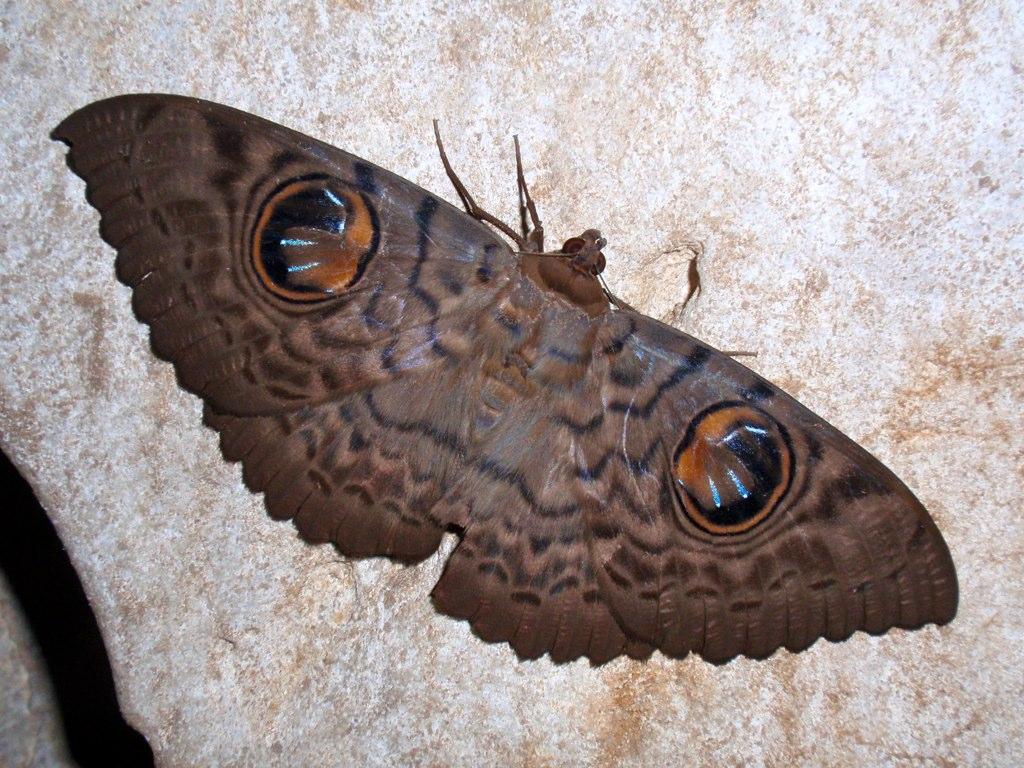

Scientific classification
- Kingdom: Animalia
- Phylum: Arthropoda
- Class: Insecta
- Order: Lepidoptera
- Superfamily: Noctuoidea
- Family: Erebidae
- Genus: Erebus
- Species: E. macrops

Binomial name
- Erebus macrops (Linnaeus, 1768)

Synonyms
- Phalaena macrops Linnaeus, 1768; Erebus boopis (Guenée, 1852); Patula boopis Guenée, 1852; Erebus bubo (Fabricius, 1775); Noctua bubo Fabricius, 1775

= Erebus macrops =

Species of moth

Erebus macrops, the common owl-moth, is a species of moth of the family Erebidae first described by Carl Linnaeus in 1768. It is found in the subtropical regions of Africa and Asia. The wingspan is about 12 cm, making it exceptionally large for an Erebidae species. The larvae feed on Acacia and Entada species.

== Description ==
Its wingspan is about 134–160 mm. Male with costal half of hindwing aborted to form turned over on the upper surface and containing a large glandular patch of flocculent (woolly) hair. Vein 4 running to the functional apex, and vein 5 from center of discocellulars. Vein 6 to the fold and veins 7 and 8 very minute to near base of costa. fuscous brown, with a slight purplish tinge. Forewings with short sub-basal and waved antemedial and medial black lines. A very large fulvous ocellus found beyond end of cell, with black outline and black comma-shaped pupil with blue streaks and specks on it. Two irregularly waved postmedial lines excurved round the ocellus and bent inwards below it, the outer one expanding into a patch at costa. Two sinuous series of black sub-marginal spots, the inner series indistinct and obsolete towards costa. Hindwings with medial black line excurved round cell. A postmedial series of spots of lunules with two sinuous series of spots found beyond them, the inner series least distinct. Ventral side with irregular postmedial series of white spots and regular submarginal series of lunules to each wing.

== Gallery ==
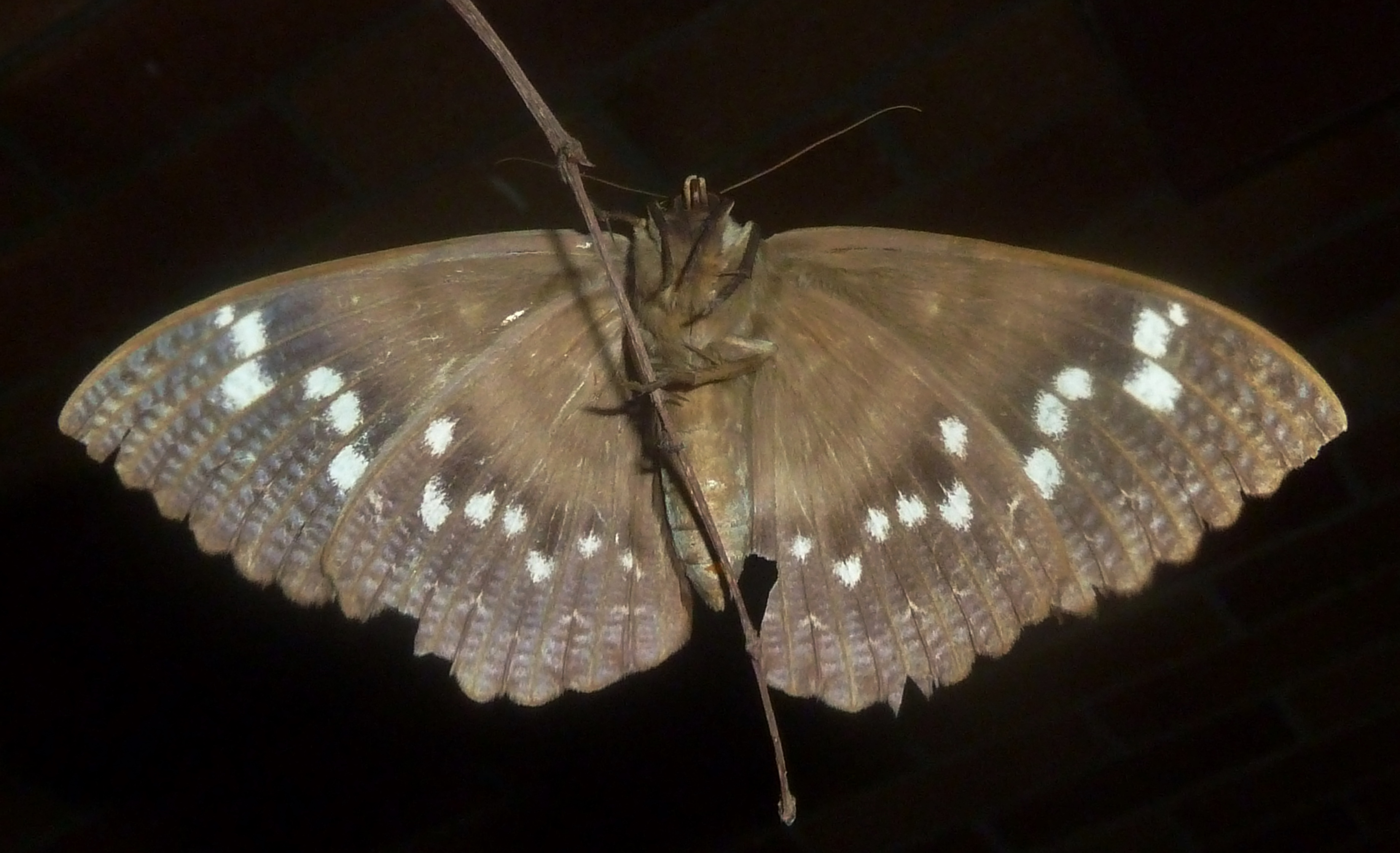
View of underside, Africa

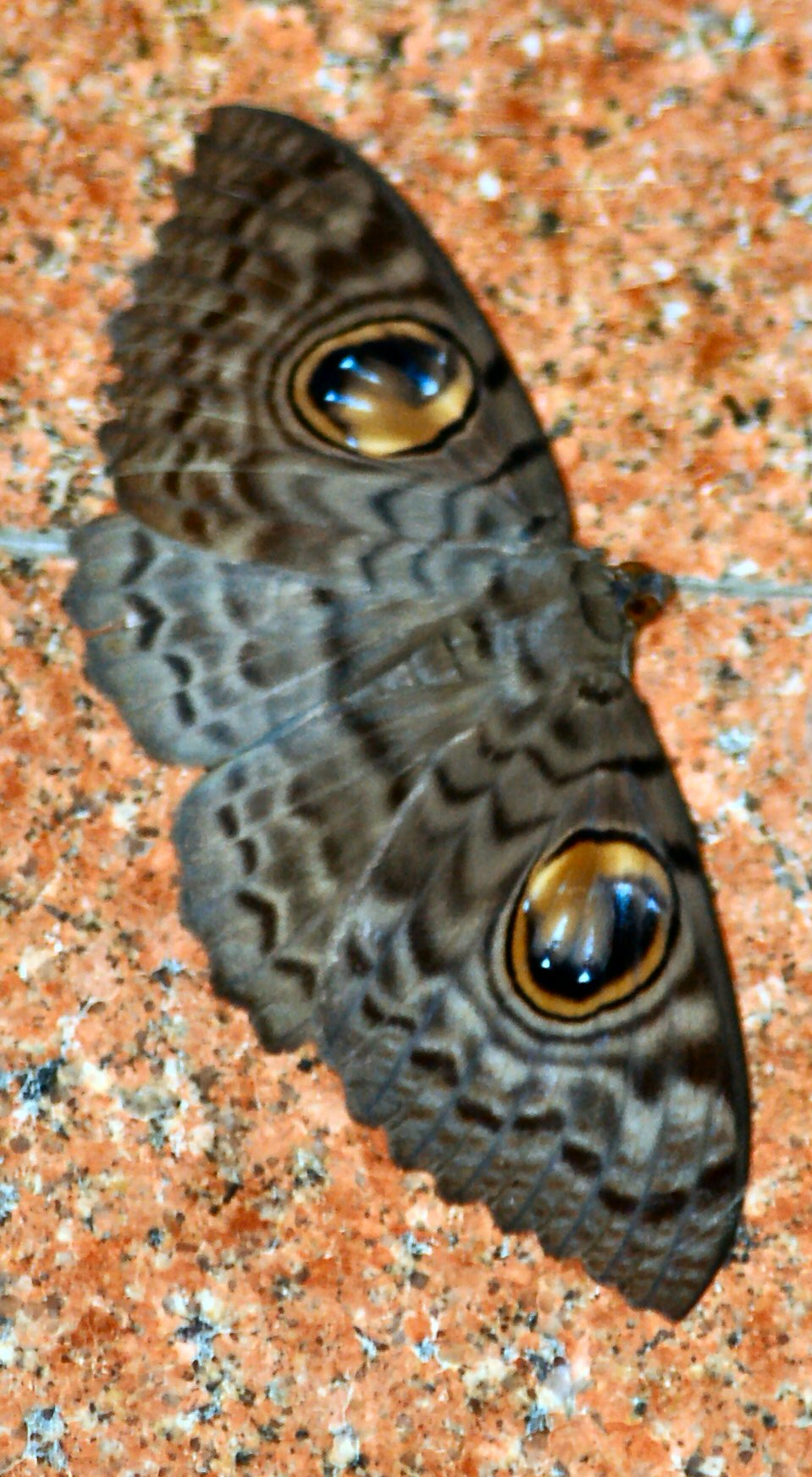
E. macrops in Asia

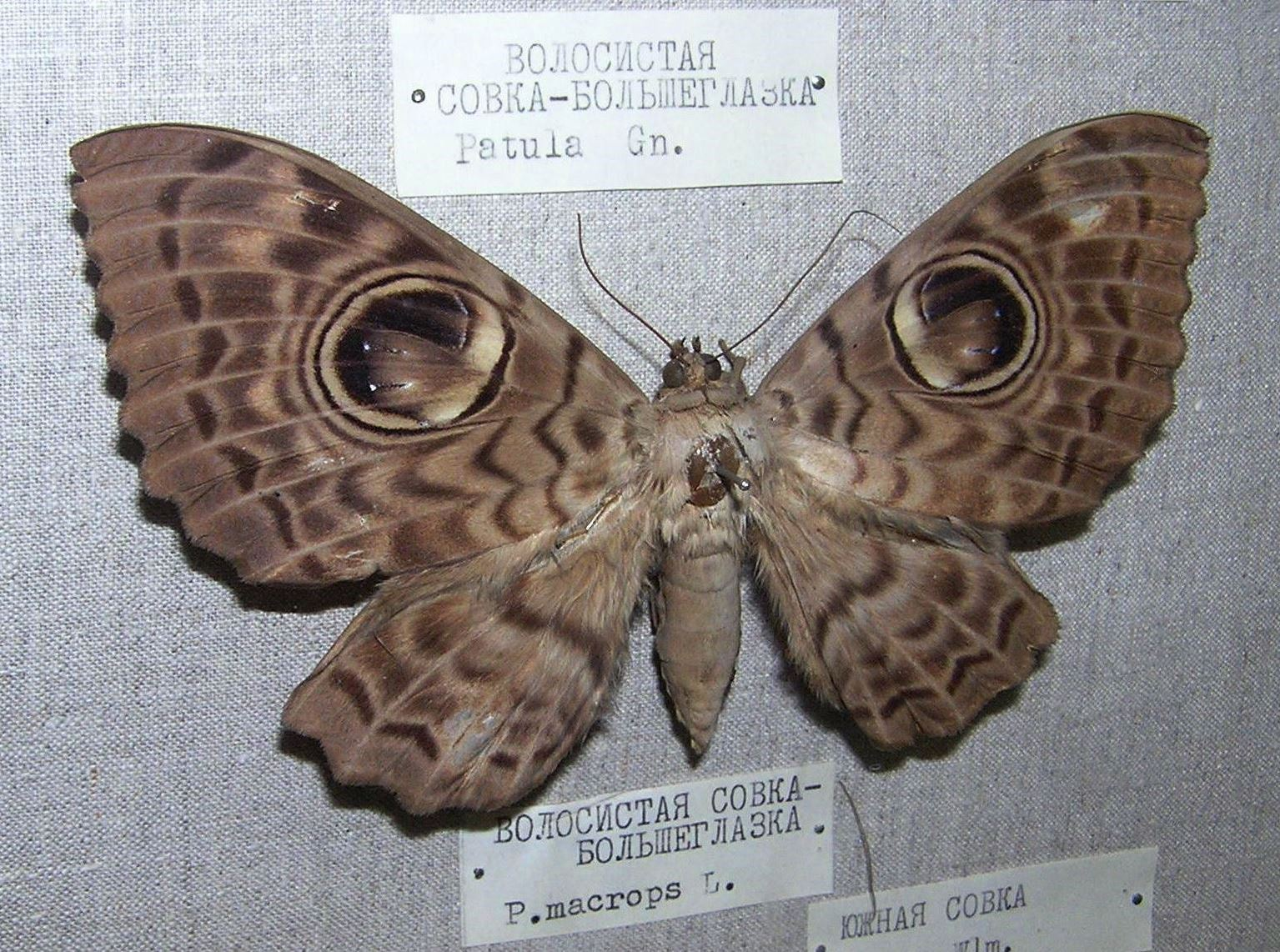
Mounted specimen
