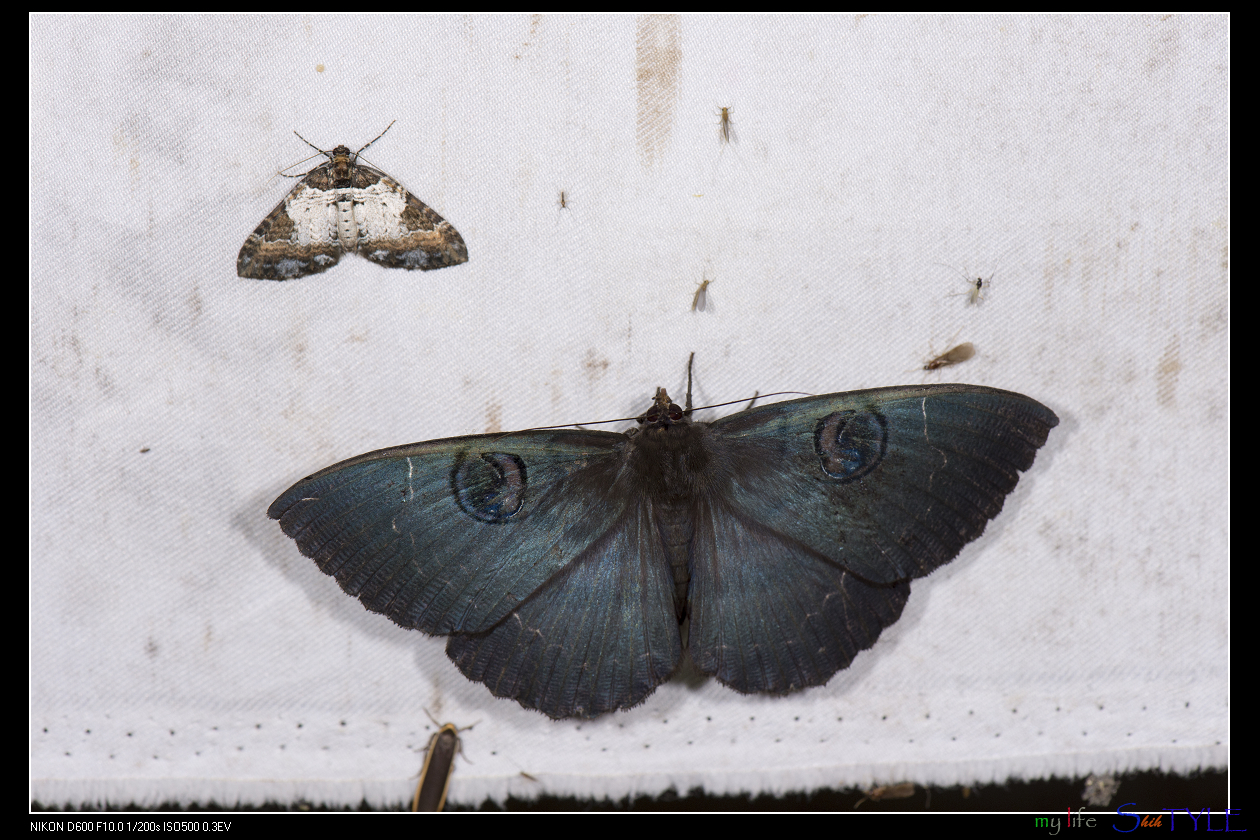

Scientific classification
- Kingdom: Animalia
- Phylum: Arthropoda
- Class: Insecta
- Order: Lepidoptera
- Superfamily: Noctuoidea
- Family: Erebidae
- Genus: Erebus
- Species: E. pilosa

Binomial name
- Erebus pilosa (Leech, 1900)

Synonyms
- Nyctipao pilosa Leech, 1900; Erebus pilosus (Leech 1900)

= Erebus pilosa =

Species of moth

Erebus pilosa is a moth of the family Erebidae. It is found in China and Taiwan.
