= Erebus acuta =

Scientific classification
- Kingdom: Animalia
- Phylum: Arthropoda
- Class: Insecta
- Order: Lepidoptera
- Superfamily: Noctuoidea
- Family: Erebidae
- Genus: Erebus
- Species: E. acuta

Binomial name
- Erebus acuta (Fawcett, 1917)

Synonyms
- Nyctipao acuta Fawcett, 1917

Species of moth

Erebus acuta is a moth of the family Erebidae. It is found in Burma.
