= Erebus illodes =

Scientific classification
- Kingdom: Animalia
- Phylum: Arthropoda
- Class: Insecta
- Order: Lepidoptera
- Superfamily: Noctuoidea
- Family: Erebidae
- Genus: Erebus
- Species: E. illodes

Binomial name
- Erebus illodes (Zerny, 1916)

Synonyms
- Nyctipao illodes Zerny, 1916

Species of moth

Erebus illodes is a moth of the family Erebidae. It is found in Java, Indonesia.
