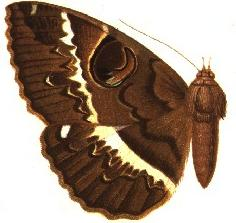
- Female
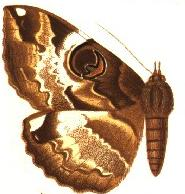
- Male

Scientific classification
- Kingdom: Animalia
- Phylum: Arthropoda
- Class: Insecta
- Order: Lepidoptera
- Superfamily: Noctuoidea
- Family: Erebidae
- Genus: Erebus
- Species: E. crepuscularis

Binomial name
- Erebus crepuscularis (Linnaeus, 1758)

Synonyms
- List: Erebus albicrustata (L. B. Prout, 1919); Nyctipao albicrustata L. B. Prout, 1919; Erebus dentifascia (Walker, 1865); Nyctipao dentifascia Walker, 1865; Erebus obscura (Bethune-Baker, 1906); Erebus meforensis (A. E. Prout, 1924); Nyctipao meforensis A. E. Prout, 1924; Erebus phaea (Turner, 1933); Nyctipao phaea Turner, 1933; Erebus saparaea Swinhoe, 1918; Erebus speciosus Hulstaert, 1924; Erebus leucotaenia (Guenée, 1852); Nyctipao leucotaenia Guenée, 1852; Nyctipao deochrata Gaede, 1938; Nyctipao subobscura Gaede, 1938

= Erebus crepuscularis =

Species of moth

Erebus crepuscularis is a species of moth in the family Erebidae first described by Carl Linnaeus in his 1758 10th edition of Systema Naturae. It is found in Indonesia, New Guinea, Taiwan (including Green Island and Orchid Island) and the Australian states of Queensland and New South Wales.
