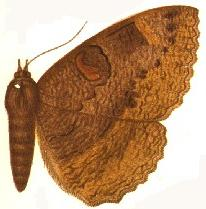
- Erebus strigipennis female
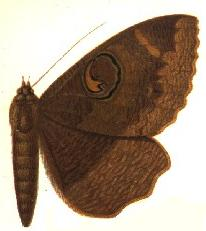
- Erebus strigipennis male

Scientific classification
- Kingdom: Animalia
- Phylum: Arthropoda
- Class: Insecta
- Order: Lepidoptera
- Superfamily: Noctuoidea
- Family: Erebidae
- Genus: Erebus
- Species: E. strigipennis

Binomial name
- Erebus strigipennis (Moore, 1883)

Synonyms
- Argiva strigipennis Moore, 1883

= Erebus strigipennis =

Species of moth

Erebus strigipennis is a moth of the family Erebidae. It is found in India (Meghalaya), Cambodia and Vietnam.
