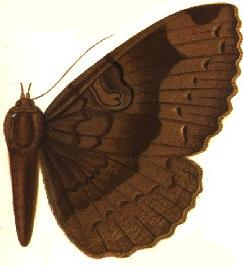

Scientific classification
- Kingdom: Animalia
- Phylum: Arthropoda
- Class: Insecta
- Order: Lepidoptera
- Superfamily: Noctuoidea
- Family: Erebidae
- Genus: Erebus
- Species: E. sumatrensis

Binomial name
- Erebus sumatrensis (Hampson, 1913)

Synonyms
- Nyctipao sumatrensis Hampson, 1913

= Erebus sumatrensis =

Species of moth

Erebus sumatrensis is a moth of the family Erebidae. It is found on Sumatra.
