= Erebus felderi =

Scientific classification
- Kingdom: Animalia
- Phylum: Arthropoda
- Clade: Pancrustacea
- Class: Insecta
- Order: Lepidoptera
- Superfamily: Noctuoidea
- Family: Erebidae
- Genus: Erebus
- Species: E. felderi

Binomial name
- Erebus felderi (Prout, 1922)

Synonyms
- Nyctipao felderi Prout, 1922; Nyctipao seistosticha Prout, 1926

Species of moth

Erebus felderi is a moth of the family Erebidae. It is found in Indonesia (Seram, Buru).
