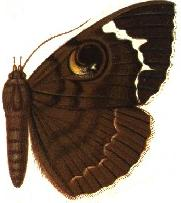

Scientific classification
- Kingdom: Animalia
- Phylum: Arthropoda
- Class: Insecta
- Order: Lepidoptera
- Superfamily: Noctuoidea
- Family: Erebidae
- Genus: Erebus
- Species: E. jaintiana

Binomial name
- Erebus jaintiana (C. Swinhoe, 1896)

Synonyms
- Nyctipao jaintiana C. Swinhoe, 1896

= Erebus jaintiana =

Species of moth

Erebus jaintiana is a moth of the family Erebidae first described by Charles Swinhoe in 1896. It is found in the Indian state of Meghalaya and in Vietnam.
