= Erebus lombokensis =

Scientific classification
- Kingdom: Animalia
- Phylum: Arthropoda
- Class: Insecta
- Order: Lepidoptera
- Superfamily: Noctuoidea
- Family: Erebidae
- Genus: Erebus
- Species: E. lombokensis

Binomial name
- Erebus lombokensis C. Swinhoe, 1915

Species of moth

Erebus lombokensis is a moth of the family Erebidae first described by Charles Swinhoe in 1915. It is found on Lombok in Indonesia.
