= Erebus terminitincta =

Scientific classification
- Kingdom: Animalia
- Phylum: Arthropoda
- Class: Insecta
- Order: Lepidoptera
- Superfamily: Noctuoidea
- Family: Erebidae
- Genus: Erebus
- Species: E. terminitincta

Binomial name
- Erebus terminitincta (Gaede, 1938)

Synonyms
- Nyctipao terminitincta Gaede, 1938; Erebus terminitinctus Fletcher 1957; Nyctipao variegatus Swinhoe 1900; Nyctipao terminitincta Strand, 1914

Species of moth

Erebus terminitincta is a moth of the family Erebidae first described by Max Gaede in 1938. It is found in Australia, where it has been recorded from the Northern Territory, Queensland and New South Wales.
