= Erebus orcina =

Scientific classification
- Kingdom: Animalia
- Phylum: Arthropoda
- Class: Insecta
- Order: Lepidoptera
- Superfamily: Noctuoidea
- Family: Erebidae
- Genus: Erebus
- Species: E. orcina

Binomial name
- Erebus orcina (Felder & Rogenhofer, 1874)

Synonyms
- Argiva orcina Felder & Rogenhofer, 1874; Erebus orcinus (Felder & Rogenhofer 1874)

Species of moth

Erebus orcina is a moth of the family Erebidae. It is found in Indonesia (Moluccas).
