= Erebus acrotaenia =

Scientific classification
- Kingdom: Animalia
- Phylum: Arthropoda
- Class: Insecta
- Order: Lepidoptera
- Superfamily: Noctuoidea
- Family: Erebidae
- Genus: Erebus
- Species: E. acrotaenia

Binomial name
- Erebus acrotaenia (Felder, 1861)

Synonyms
- Argiva acrotaenia Felder, 1861

Species of moth

Erebus acrotaenia is a moth of the family Erebidae.

== Distribution ==
It is found in Indonesia (Ambon Island).
