= Erebus albiangulata =

Scientific classification
- Kingdom: Animalia
- Phylum: Arthropoda
- Clade: Pancrustacea
- Class: Insecta
- Order: Lepidoptera
- Superfamily: Noctuoidea
- Family: Erebidae
- Genus: Erebus
- Species: E. albiangulata

Binomial name
- Erebus albiangulata (Prout, 1924)

Synonyms
- Nyctipao albiangulata Prout, 1924; Erebus albiangulatus (Prout 1924)

Species of moth

Erebus albiangulata is a moth of the family Erebidae. It is found in Indonesia (Sumatra).
