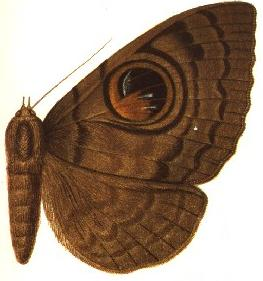

Scientific classification
- Kingdom: Animalia
- Phylum: Arthropoda
- Class: Insecta
- Order: Lepidoptera
- Superfamily: Noctuoidea
- Family: Erebidae
- Genus: Erebus
- Species: E. macfarlanei

Binomial name
- Erebus macfarlanei (Butler, 1876)

Synonyms
- Patula macfarlanei Butler, 1876; Nyctipao macfarlanei; Patula moriola Swinhoe, 1918; Erebus moriola (Swinhoe, 1918); Erebus oxodoxia (Swinhoe, 1918); Patula oxodoxia Swinhoe, 1918

= Erebus macfarlanei =

Species of moth

Erebus macfarlanei is a moth of the family Erebidae. It is found in Queensland and from the Southern Moluccas and Indonesia (including Papua New Guinea and Ambon) to the Solomon Islands.
