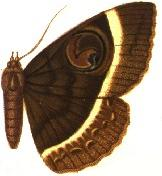
- Erebus gemmans female
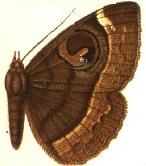
- Erebus gemmans male

Scientific classification
- Kingdom: Animalia
- Phylum: Arthropoda
- Class: Insecta
- Order: Lepidoptera
- Superfamily: Noctuoidea
- Family: Erebidae
- Genus: Erebus
- Species: E. gemmans

Binomial name
- Erebus gemmans (Guenée, 1852)

Synonyms
- Nyctipao gemmans Guenée, 1852; Erebus ophristigmaris (Hampson, 1895); Nyctipao ophristigmaris Hampson, 1895

= Erebus gemmans =

Species of moth

Erebus gemmans is a moth of the family Erebidae. It is found in Asia, including China, India, Bangladesh, Bhutan, Nepal, Thailand, Burma, Malaysia, Taiwan, Sumatra and Borneo.

The wingspan is 62–82 mm.
