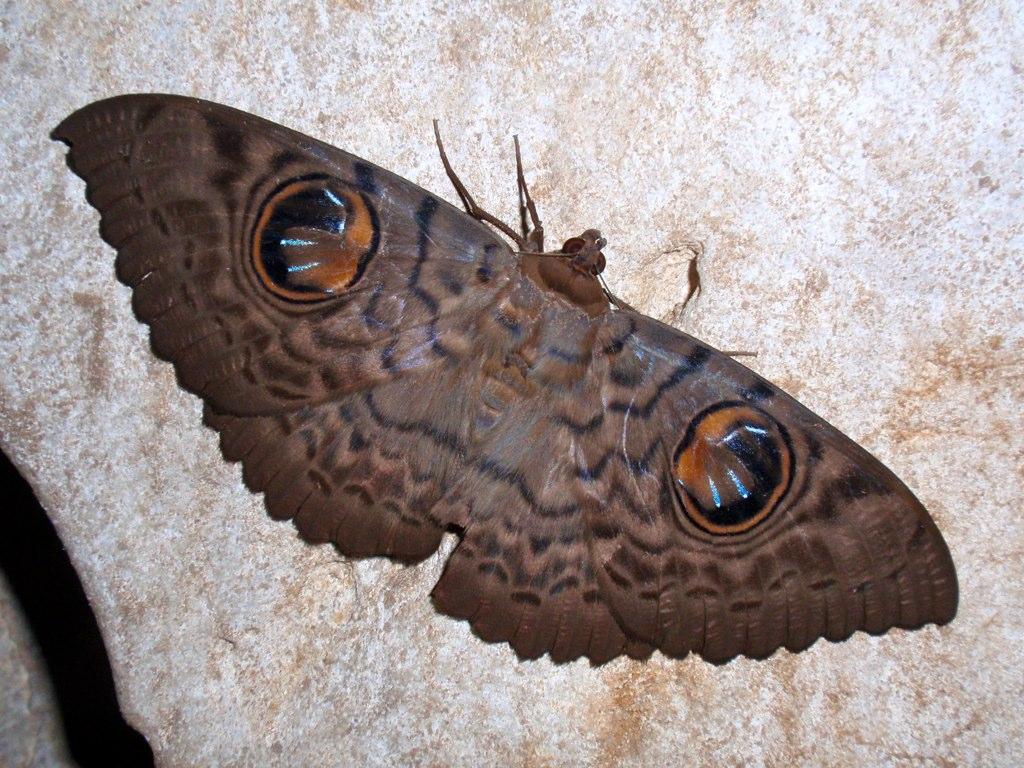
- Erebus macrops
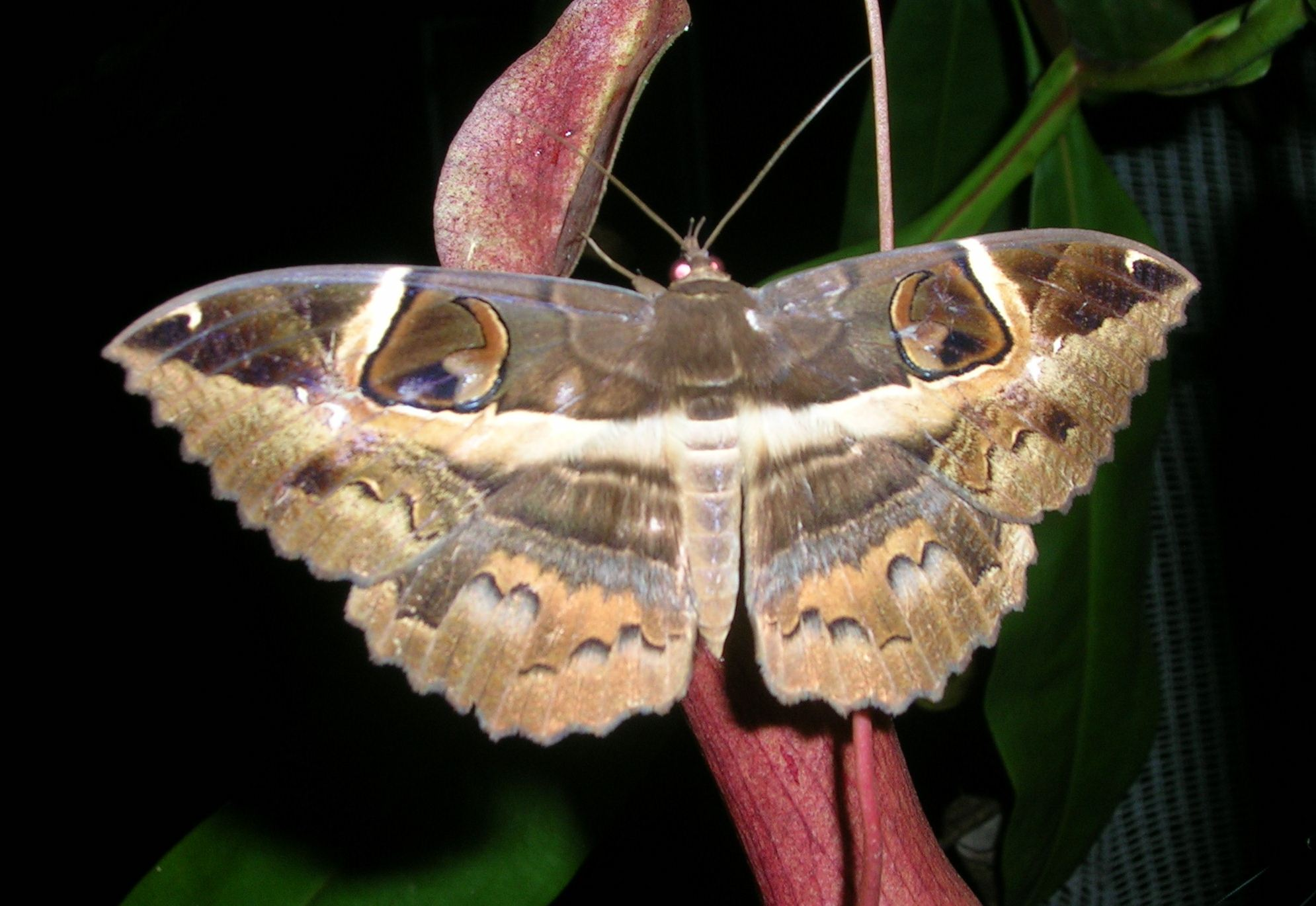
- Erebus ephesperis

Scientific classification
- Kingdom: Animalia
- Phylum: Arthropoda
- Class: Insecta
- Order: Lepidoptera
- Superfamily: Noctuoidea
- Family: Erebidae
- Tribe: Erebini
- Genus: Erebus; Latreille, 1810

Synonyms
- Argiva Hubner, 1823; Bocana Walker, 1865 (preocc. Walker, [1859]); Byas Billberg, 1820; Cariona Swinhoe, 1918; Coria Walker, 1866; Crishna Kirby, 1897; Eupatula Ragonot, 1894; Nyctipao Hubner, 1823; Patula Guenée, 1852 (preocc. Held, 1837)

= Erebus (moth) =

Genus of moths

Erebus is a genus of moths in the family Erebidae.

== Taxonomy ==
The genus is the type genus of the tribe Erebini, subfamily Erebinae, and family Erebidae.

== Description ==
Differs from Speiredonia in the mid and hind tibia being spined and almost naked. Forewings are broad.

== Species ==
- Erebus acrotaenia (Felder, 1861)
- Erebus acuta (Fawcett, 1917)
- Erebus aerosa (Swinhoe, 1900)
- Erebus albiangulata (A. E. Prout, 1924)
- Erebus albicinctus (Kollar, 1844) (syn: Erebus obscurata (Wileman, 1923), Erebus rivularis Westwood, 1848)
- Erebus atavistis (Hampson 1913)
- Erebus candidii (Strand 1920)
- Erebus caprimulgus (Fabricius, 1775)
- Erebus clavifera (Hampson, 1913)
- Erebus crepuscularis (Linnaeus, 1758) (syn: Erebus obscura (Bethune-Baker, 1906) )
- Erebus cyclops (Felder, 1861)
- Erebus ephesperis (Hübner, 1827)
- Erebus felderi (A. E. Prout, 1922) (syn: Erebus seistosticha (A. E. Prout, 1926))
- Erebus gemmans (Guenée, 1852)
- Erebus glaucopis (Walker, 1858) (syn: Erebus prunosa (Moore, 1883))
- Erebus hieroglyphica (Drury, 1773) (syn: Erebus celebensis (Hopffer, 1874), Erebus hermonia (Cramer, 1777), Erebus lunaris (Walker, 1864), Erebus mygdonia (Cramer, 1777), Erebus tenebrata (L. B. Prout, 1919), Erebus ulula (Fabricius, 1775))
- Erebus illodes (Zerny, 1916)
- Erebus intermedia (Pagenstecher, 1900)
- Erebus ipsa (Swinhoe, 1918)
- Erebus jaintiana (Swinhoe, 1896)
- Erebus lombokensis Swinhoe, 1915
- Erebus macfarlanei (Butler, 1876)
- Erebus macrops (Linnaeus, 1768)
- Erebus maurus (Gaede, 1917)
- Erebus mirans A. E. Prout, 1932
- Erebus nyctaculis (Snellen, 1880)
- Erebus orcina (Felder and Rogenhofer, 1874)
- Erebus pilosa (Leech, 1900)
- Erebus purpurata (Druce, 1888) (syn: Erebus aroa Bethune-Baker, 1908)
- Erebus strigipennis (Moore, 1883)
- Erebus sumatrensis (Hampson, 1913)
- Erebus sumbana (Swinhoe, 1918) (syn: Erebus ceramica (Swinhoe 1918), Erebus luzonica (Swinhoe, 1918))
- Erebus superba (Swinhoe, 1908)
- Erebus terminitincta (Gaede, 1938) (syn: Erebus variegata (Swinhoe, 1900))
- Erebus variegata (Butler, 1887)
- Erebus walkeri (Butler, 1875) (syn: Erebus valceri (Hampson, 1913))

== Former species ==
- Erebus javanensis (Hampson, 1913)
- Erebus moriola (Swinhoe, 1918)
- Erebus orion (Hampson, 1913)
- Erebus oxodoxia (Swinhoe, 1918)
