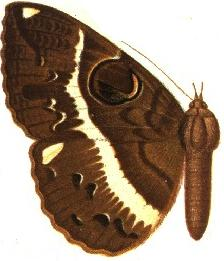
- Erebus variegata female
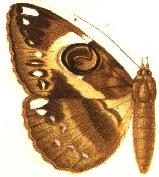
- Erebus variegata male

Scientific classification
- Kingdom: Animalia
- Phylum: Arthropoda
- Class: Insecta
- Order: Lepidoptera
- Superfamily: Noctuoidea
- Family: Erebidae
- Genus: Erebus
- Species: E. variegata

Binomial name
- Erebus variegata (Butler, 1887)

Synonyms
- Nyctipao variegata Butler, 1887; Erebus caliginea (Butler, 1887); Nyctipao caliginea Butler, 1887

= Erebus variegata =

Species of moth

Erebus variegata is a moth of the family Erebidae. It is found on the Solomon Islands and New Guinea.
