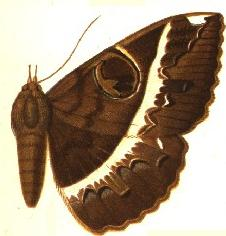

Scientific classification
- Kingdom: Animalia
- Phylum: Arthropoda
- Class: Insecta
- Order: Lepidoptera
- Superfamily: Noctuoidea
- Family: Erebidae
- Genus: Erebus
- Species: E. clavifera

Binomial name
- Erebus clavifera (Hampson, 1913)

Synonyms
- Nyctipao clavifera Hampson, 1913; Nyctipao clavifer; Erebus clavifer; Erebus philippensis Swinhoe, 1918

= Erebus clavifera =

Species of moth

Erebus clavifera is a moth of the family Erebidae. It is found in Asia, including China and the Philippines.
