= Erebus cyclops =

Scientific classification
- Kingdom: Animalia
- Phylum: Arthropoda
- Class: Insecta
- Order: Lepidoptera
- Superfamily: Noctuoidea
- Family: Erebidae
- Genus: Erebus
- Species: E. cyclops

Binomial name
- Erebus cyclops (Felder, 1861)

Synonyms
- Patula cyclops Felder, 1861

Species of moth

Erebus cyclops is a moth of the family Erebidae. It is found in Indonesia (Ambon Island).
