= Erebus albicinctus =

Scientific classification
- Kingdom: Animalia
- Phylum: Arthropoda
- Class: Insecta
- Order: Lepidoptera
- Superfamily: Noctuoidea
- Family: Erebidae
- Genus: Erebus
- Species: E. albicinctus

Binomial name
- Erebus albicinctus Kollar, 1844

Synonyms
- Nyctipao obscuratus Wileman, 1923; Erebus rivularis Westwood, 1848

Species of moth

Erebus albicinctus, the Oriental purple owl-moth is a moth of the family Erebidae. It is found in Taiwan, China (Shaanxi), India (Assam, Meghalaya), Nepal, Bangladesh, Thailand and Indonesia (Sumatra).
