= Erebus ipsa =

Scientific classification
- Kingdom: Animalia
- Phylum: Arthropoda
- Class: Insecta
- Order: Lepidoptera
- Superfamily: Noctuoidea
- Family: Erebidae
- Genus: Erebus
- Species: E. ipsa

Binomial name
- Erebus ipsa (C. Swinhoe, 1918)

Synonyms
- Patula ipsa C. Swinhoe, 1918

Species of moth

Erebus ipsa is a moth of the family Erebidae first described by Charles Swinhoe in 1918. It is found in Sri Lanka.
