= Erebus sumbana =

Scientific classification
- Kingdom: Animalia
- Phylum: Arthropoda
- Class: Insecta
- Order: Lepidoptera
- Superfamily: Noctuoidea
- Family: Erebidae
- Genus: Erebus
- Species: E. sumbana

Binomial name
- Erebus sumbana (C. Swinhoe, 1918)

Synonyms
- Argiva sumbana C. Swinhoe, 1918; Argiva ceramicus C. Swinhoe, 1918; Argiva luzonicus C. Swinhoe, 1918; Erebus sumbanus (C. Swinhoe, 1918)

Species of moth

Erebus sumbana is a moth of the family Erebidae first described by Charles Swinhoe in 1918. It is found on the Indonesian islands of Seram and Sumba and the Philippine island of Luzon.
