= Erebus purpurata =

Scientific classification
- Kingdom: Animalia
- Phylum: Arthropoda
- Class: Insecta
- Order: Lepidoptera
- Superfamily: Noctuoidea
- Family: Erebidae
- Genus: Erebus
- Species: E. purpurata

Binomial name
- Erebus purpurata (Druce, 1888)

Synonyms
- Argiva purpurata Druce, 1888; Nyctipao aroa Bethune-Baker, 1908; Erebus purpuratus (Druce 1888)

Species of moth

Erebus purpurata is a moth of the family Erebidae. It is found on the Solomon Islands and New Guinea.
