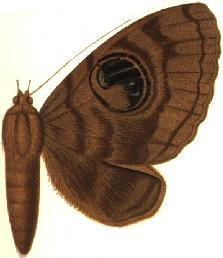

Scientific classification
- Kingdom: Animalia
- Phylum: Arthropoda
- Class: Insecta
- Order: Lepidoptera
- Superfamily: Noctuoidea
- Family: Erebidae
- Genus: Erebus
- Species: E. nyctaculis

Binomial name
- Erebus nyctaculis (Snellen, 1880)

Synonyms
- Nyctipao nyctaculis Snellen, 1880; Nyctipao philippinensis Gaede, 1938; Erebus philippinensis (Gaede, 1938); Nyctipao javanensis Hampson, 1913; Erebus javanensis (Hampson, 1913)

= Erebus nyctaculis =

Species of moth

Erebus nyctaculis is a moth of the family Erebidae. It is found from Mindanao and Indonesia (including Java and Sulawesi) south to northern Australia.
