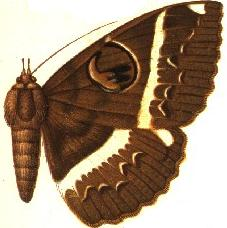
- Erebus intermedia female
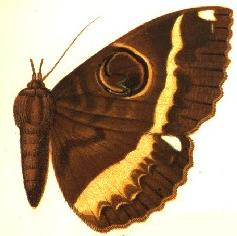
- Erebus intermedia male

Scientific classification
- Kingdom: Animalia
- Phylum: Arthropoda
- Class: Insecta
- Order: Lepidoptera
- Superfamily: Noctuoidea
- Family: Erebidae
- Genus: Erebus
- Species: E. intermedia

Binomial name
- Erebus intermedia (Pagenstecher, 1900)

Synonyms
- Nyctipao intermedia Pagenstecher, 1900; Erebus albicans (Roepke 1935); Erebus bismarcia (Hampson, 1913); Nyctipao bismarcia Hampson, 1913; Erebus insularis Roepke, 1935

= Erebus intermedia =

Species of moth

Erebus intermedia is a moth of the family Erebidae. It is found in Asia, including the Bismarck Archipelago and Sulawesi.
