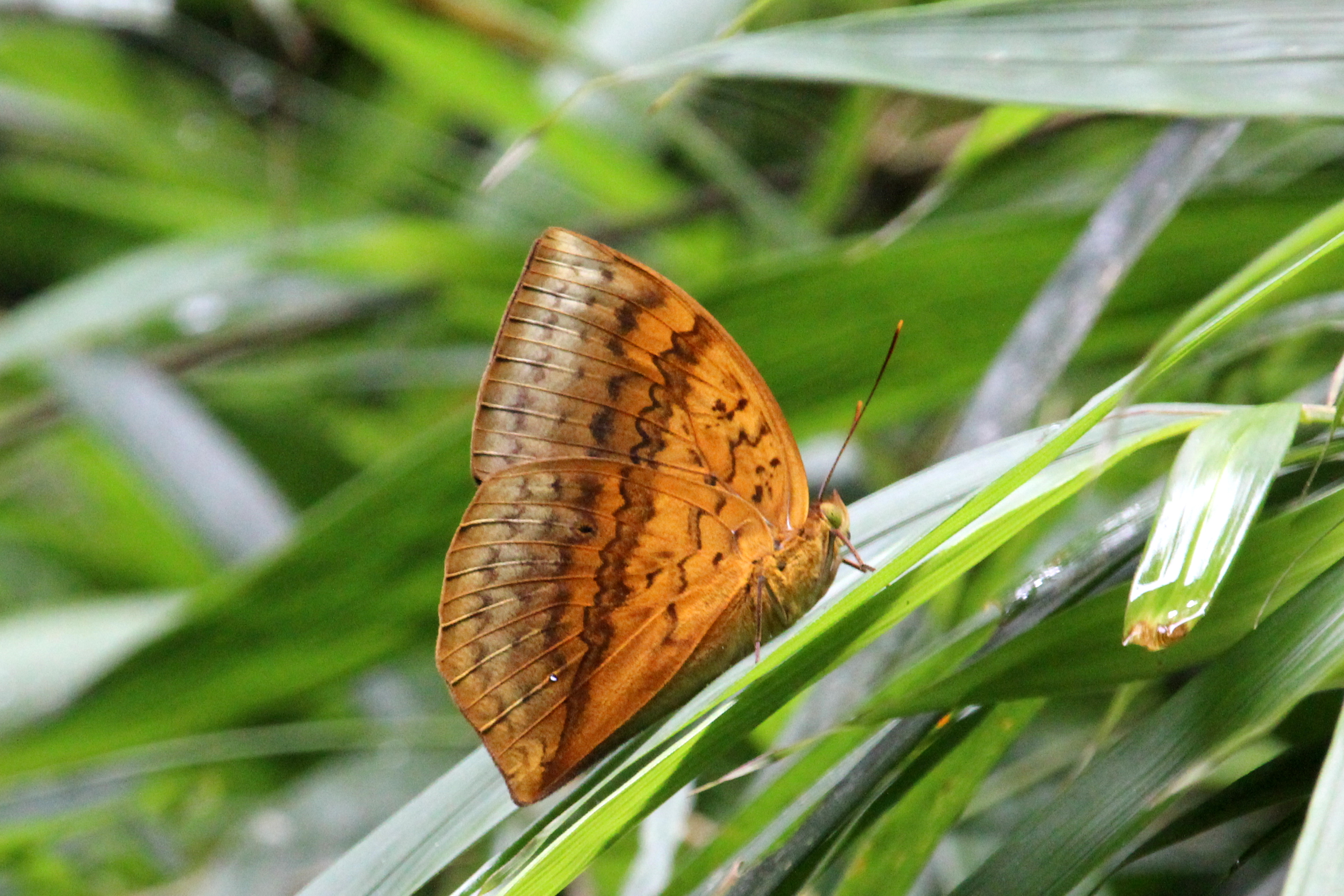
- From Arunachal Pradesh, India

Scientific classification
- Domain: Eukaryota
- Kingdom: Animalia
- Phylum: Arthropoda
- Class: Insecta
- Order: Lepidoptera
- Family: Nymphalidae
- Genus: Enispe
- Species: E. cycnus

Binomial name
- Enispe cycnus (Westwood, 1851)

= Enispe cycnus =

Blue caliph

Species of butterfly

Enispe cycnus, the blue caliph, is a species of nymphalid butterfly found in Southeast Asia.

== Description ==
Male has the upperside dark brown. Forewing with a broad oblique bluish-white band beyond cell from costa to vein 4, deflected inwards below and continued by three large outwardly emarginate spots between the veins; beyond these an erect series of four more or less triangular spots of the same colour. Hindwing: basal area clothed with long hair, a subterminal curved series of obscure small light brown spots, followed by a terminal series of light brown lunular markings between the veins. Underside dark ochraceous, paling towards the terminal margins; a darker ochraceous straight discal band across both forewing and hindwing from costa of forewing to tornus of hindwing, defined inwardly and outwardly by sinuous dark ferruginous-brown lines, the basal area inside the band studded with spots and short transverse sinuous streaks of ferruginous brown, and the terminal halves of the wings with three rows of obscure dusky markings between the veins. Hindwing with a minute silvery ocellus in interspace 1 and a small black spot in interspace 5. Antennae, head, thorax and abdomen brown above; antennae excepted, ochraceous yellow beneath.

Upperside of female differs from the male in the forewing as follows: five inner discal ochraceous spots and the discal band terminating in an ochraceous spot; on the hindwing a discontinuous transverse line, followed by a postdiscal row of large hastate (spear-shaped) spots; a subterminal series of quadrate spots and a terminal series of lunular marks between the veins bright ochraceous. Underside as in the male, but the ground colour uniformly paler ochraceous.

Found in Assam, Bhutan and Upper Myanmar.
