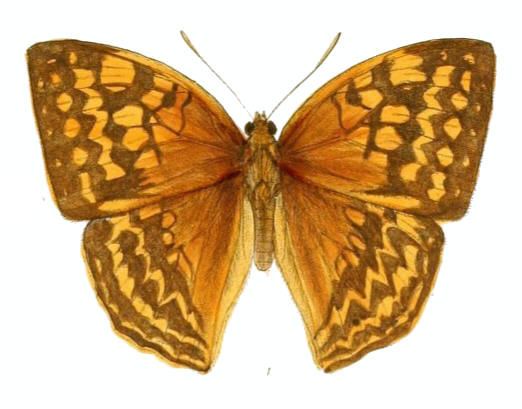

Scientific classification
- Kingdom: Animalia
- Phylum: Arthropoda
- Clade: Pancrustacea
- Class: Insecta
- Order: Lepidoptera
- Family: Nymphalidae
- Tribe: Amathusiini
- Genus: Enispe; Doubleday, [1848]

Synonyms
- Enispe Westwood, [1850]

= Enispe (butterfly) =

Genus of brush-footed butterflies

Enispe or the caliphs is a genus of nymphalid butterfly in the subfamily Morphinae. They are found in western China and from Sikkim to Borneo.

== Species ==
- Enispe cycnus Westwood, 1851
- Enispe duranius Fruhstorfer, 1911
- Enispe euthymius (Doubleday, 1845)
- Enispe intermedia Rothschild, 1916
- Enispe lunatus Leech, 1891 western China (Sichuan), eastern Tibet.
- Enispe milvus Staudinger, [1897] northern Borneo
