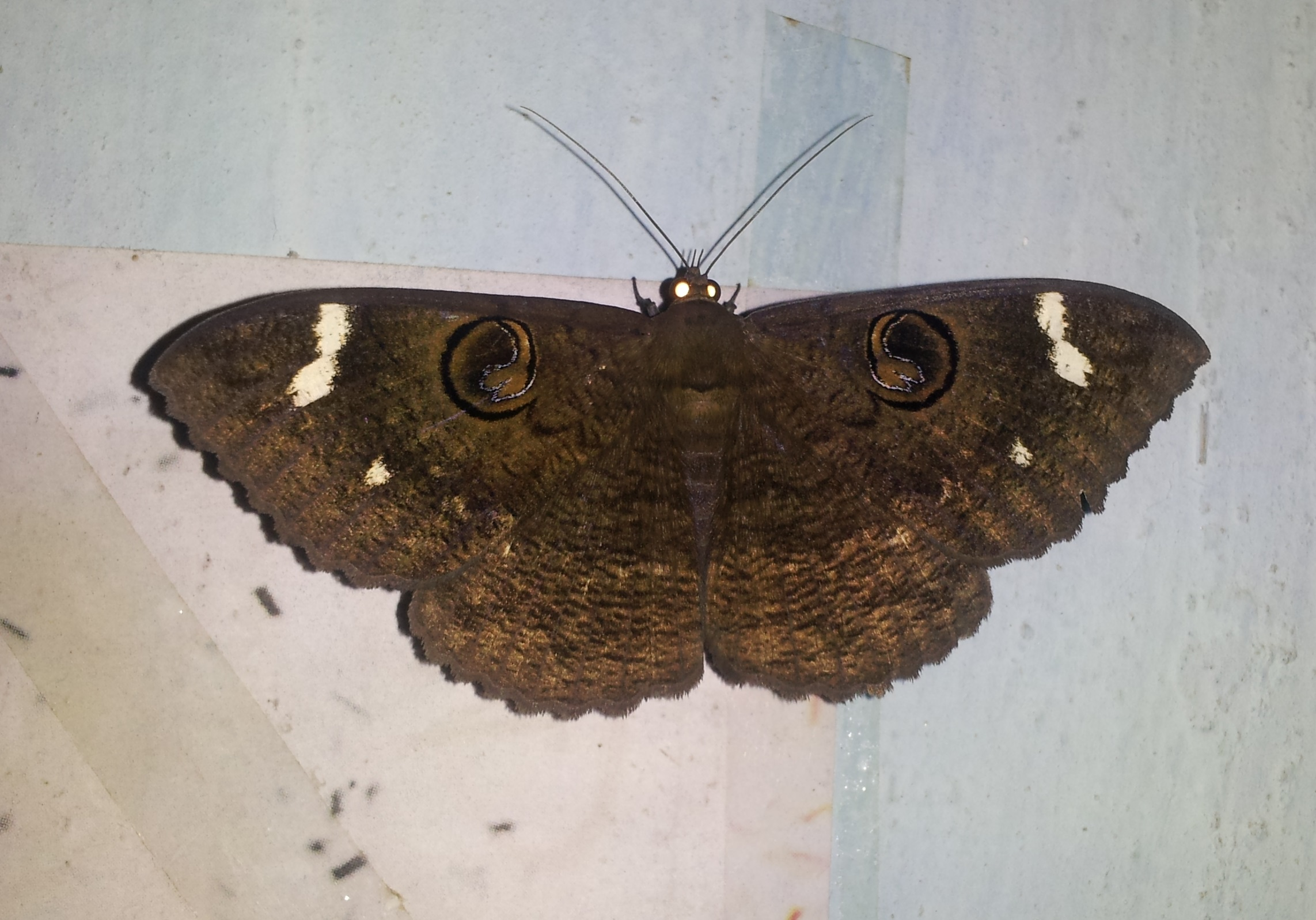
- From Sri Lanka

Scientific classification
- Kingdom: Animalia
- Phylum: Arthropoda
- Class: Insecta
- Order: Lepidoptera
- Superfamily: Noctuoidea
- Family: Erebidae
- Genus: Erebus
- Species: E. hieroglyphica

Binomial name
- Erebus hieroglyphica (Drury, 1773)

Synonyms
- Phalaena hieroglyphica Drury, 1773; Erebus hieroglyphicus; Argiva celebensis Hopffer, 1874; Phalaena hermonia Cramer, 1777; Bocana lunaris Walker, 1865; Phalaena mygdonia Cramer, 1777; Nyctipao tenebratus Prout, 1919; Noctua ulula Fabricius, 1775

= Erebus hieroglyphica =

Species of moth

Erebus hieroglyphica is a moth of the family Erebidae. It is found from the Oriental tropical countries such as India, Pakistan, Sri Lanka, Bangladesh, Japan, China, Taiwan, Cambodia, Laos, Myanmar, Thailand, Vietnam, Indonesia, Philippines, Malaysia, Singapore, and Korea. The habitat consist of lowland forests.

== Description ==
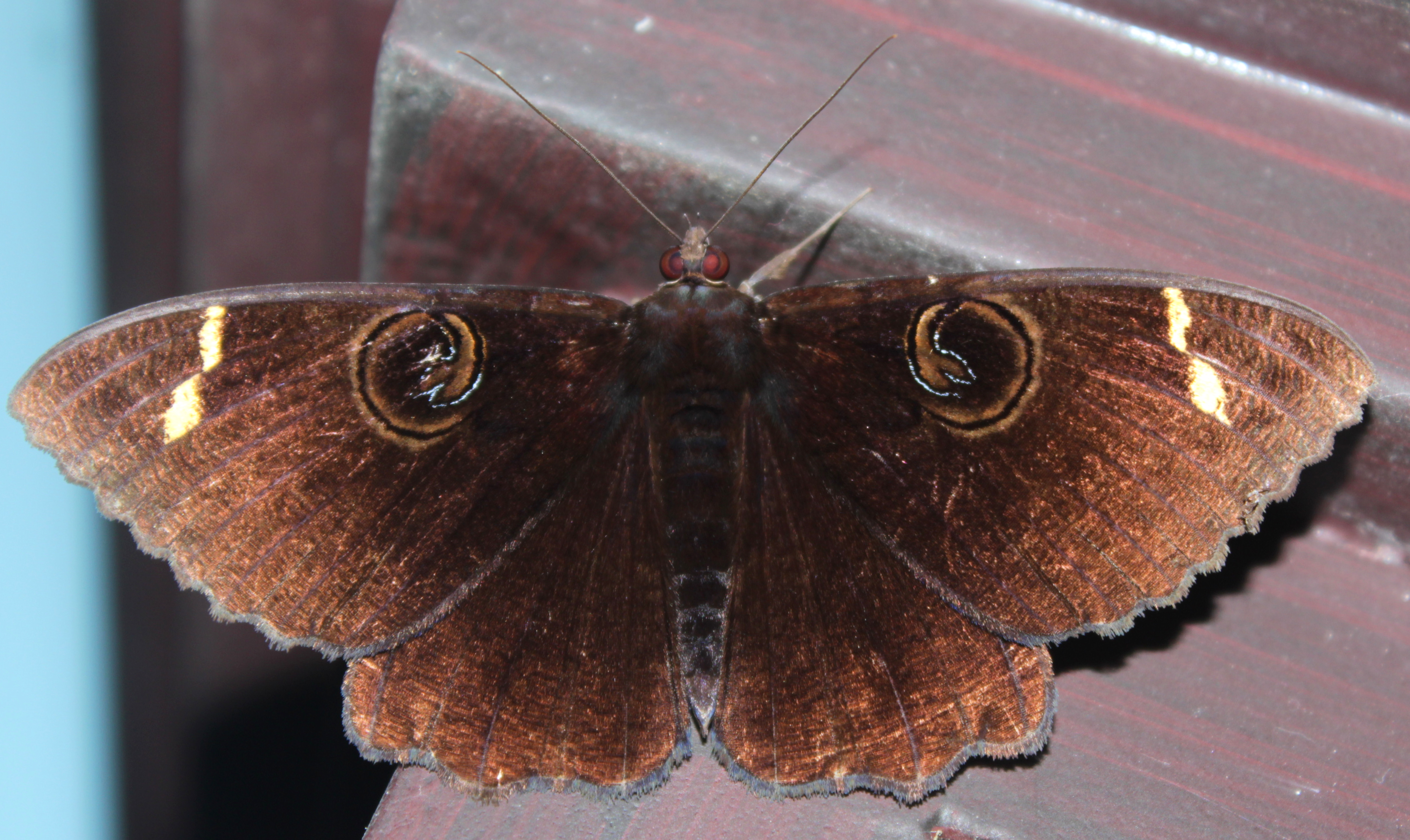
In Thrippunithura, Kerala.

Its wingspan is about 88 mm. Adults exhibit strong sexual dimorphism. They have been reported feeding on the juices of tropical fruit.

Male with vein 3 running to the functional apex of hindwing. The costal fold obsolete, and the small patch with gland. Male with veins 4 to 8 of hindwings moderately developed in the aborted costal area. Body rich blackish brown. Forewings with a whorl-shaped black mark beyond end of cell, bilobed and expanding at head, where it is outlined with blue. An oblique yellow bar runs from costa near apex, and very few show reaching outer margin.

Female has brown body with black stria. Forewings with white oblique bar. Both wings with traces of postmedial band of whitish marks and white spot on forewing above vein 3.
