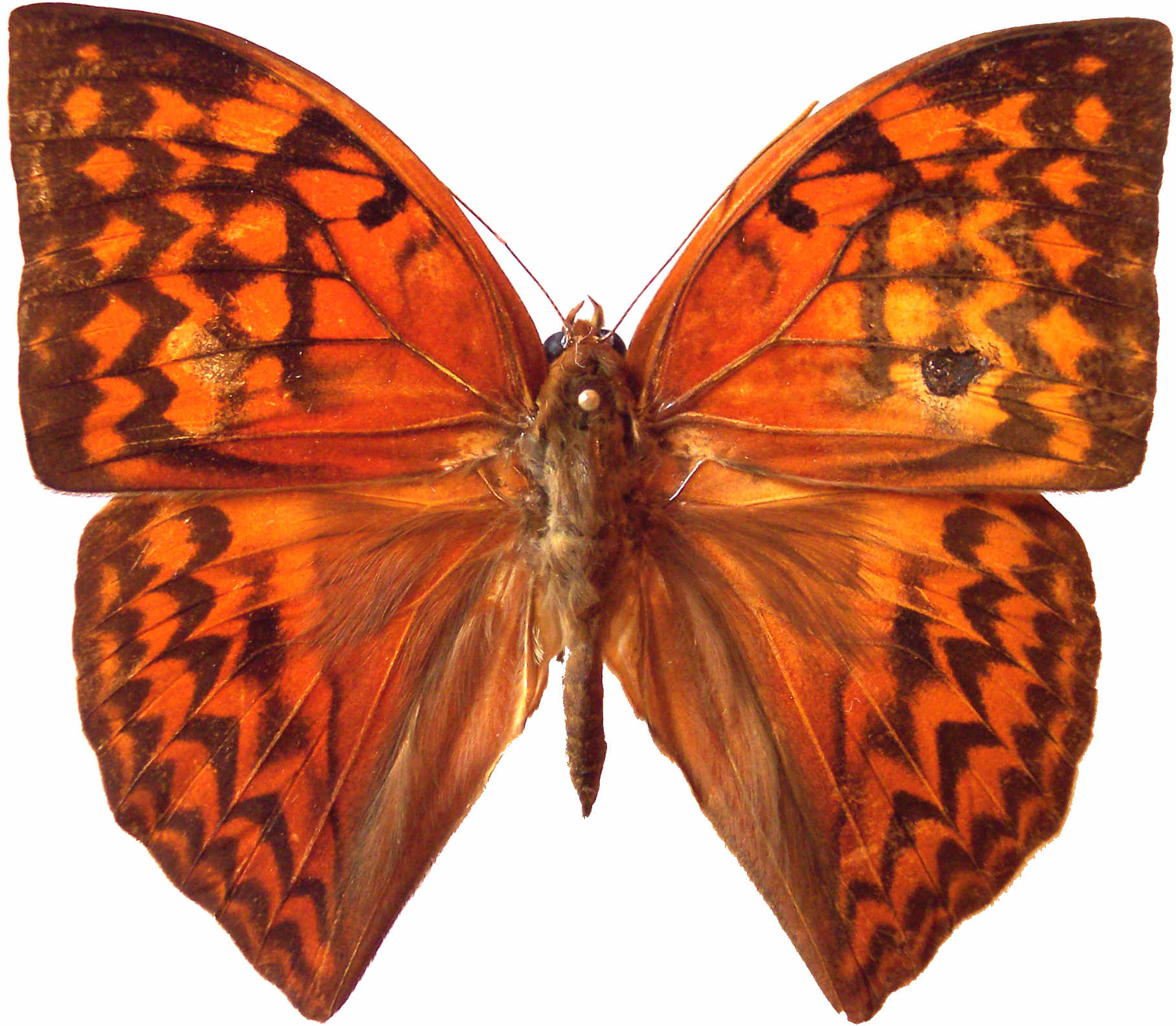
- Enispe intermedia corbeti male from the Cameron Highlands of Malaysia

Scientific classification
- Domain: Eukaryota
- Kingdom: Animalia
- Phylum: Arthropoda
- Class: Insecta
- Order: Lepidoptera
- Family: Nymphalidae
- Genus: Enispe
- Species: E. intermedia

Binomial name
- Enispe intermedia Rothschild, 1916

= Enispe intermedia =

Species of butterfly

Enispe intermedia is a butterfly found in South Asia that belongs to the Morphinae subfamily of the brush-footed butterflies family.

== Distribution ==
It ranges among Assam, Manipur, Myanmar, Thailand, peninsular Malaysia and Sumatra.

== See also ==
- List of butterflies of India
- List of butterflies of India (Morphinae)
- List of butterflies of India (Nymphalidae)
