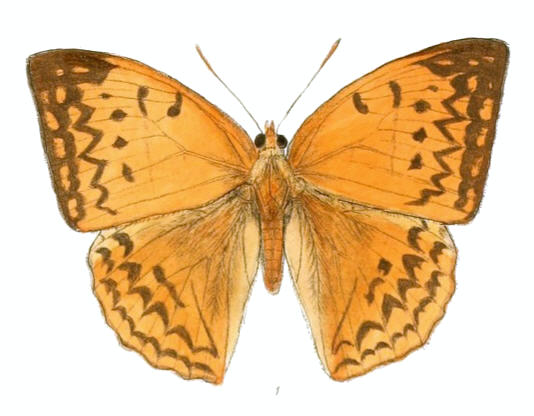

Scientific classification
- Kingdom: Animalia
- Phylum: Arthropoda
- Clade: Pancrustacea
- Class: Insecta
- Order: Lepidoptera
- Family: Nymphalidae
- Genus: Enispe
- Species: E. euthymius

Binomial name
- Enispe euthymius (Doubleday, 1845)

= Enispe euthymius =

Red caliph

Species of butterfly

Enispe euthymius, the red caliph or Northern red caliph, is a species of nymphalid butterfly found in Southeast Asia.

== Description ==
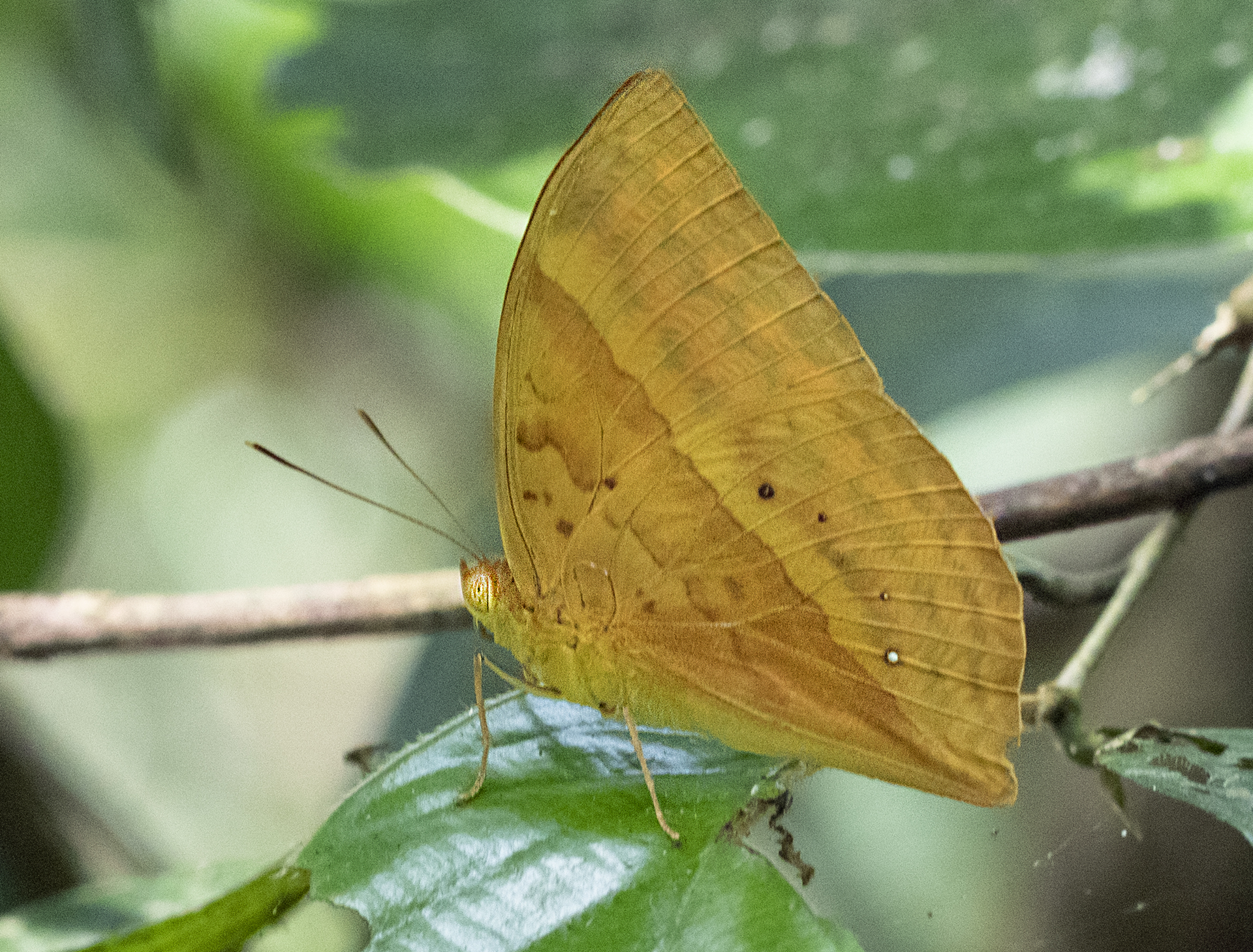
Close wing of Enispe euthymius euthymius (Doubleday, 1845) – Himalayan Red Caliph

The upperside of both males and females is a rich ochraceous orange. The forewing has a spot along the upper portion of the discocellulars, two fine lunate spots beyond, an erect series of four discal spots, a subterminal zigzag narrow band, the apical portion of the costa, the apex and the terminal margin broadly black. Hindwing: a discal irregular transversely elongate suffused mark and two series of lunular continuous marks beyond black; termen narrowly fuscous. Underside rich bright ochraceous; a broad transverse band across both wings from costa of forewing to the tornus of the hindwing slightly darker ochraceous, defined inwardly by an irregular sinuous and broken, and outwardly by a straighter complete ferruginous line; some ferruginous spots at the bases of the wings, and on the hindwing a discal series of three or four minute dark ocelli, the lowest white centred; outer halves of both forewing and hindwing uniform, the black markings of the upperside showing faintly through. Antennae, head, thorax and abdomen bright ochraceous.

It is found in Sikkim, Assam and Myanmar.
