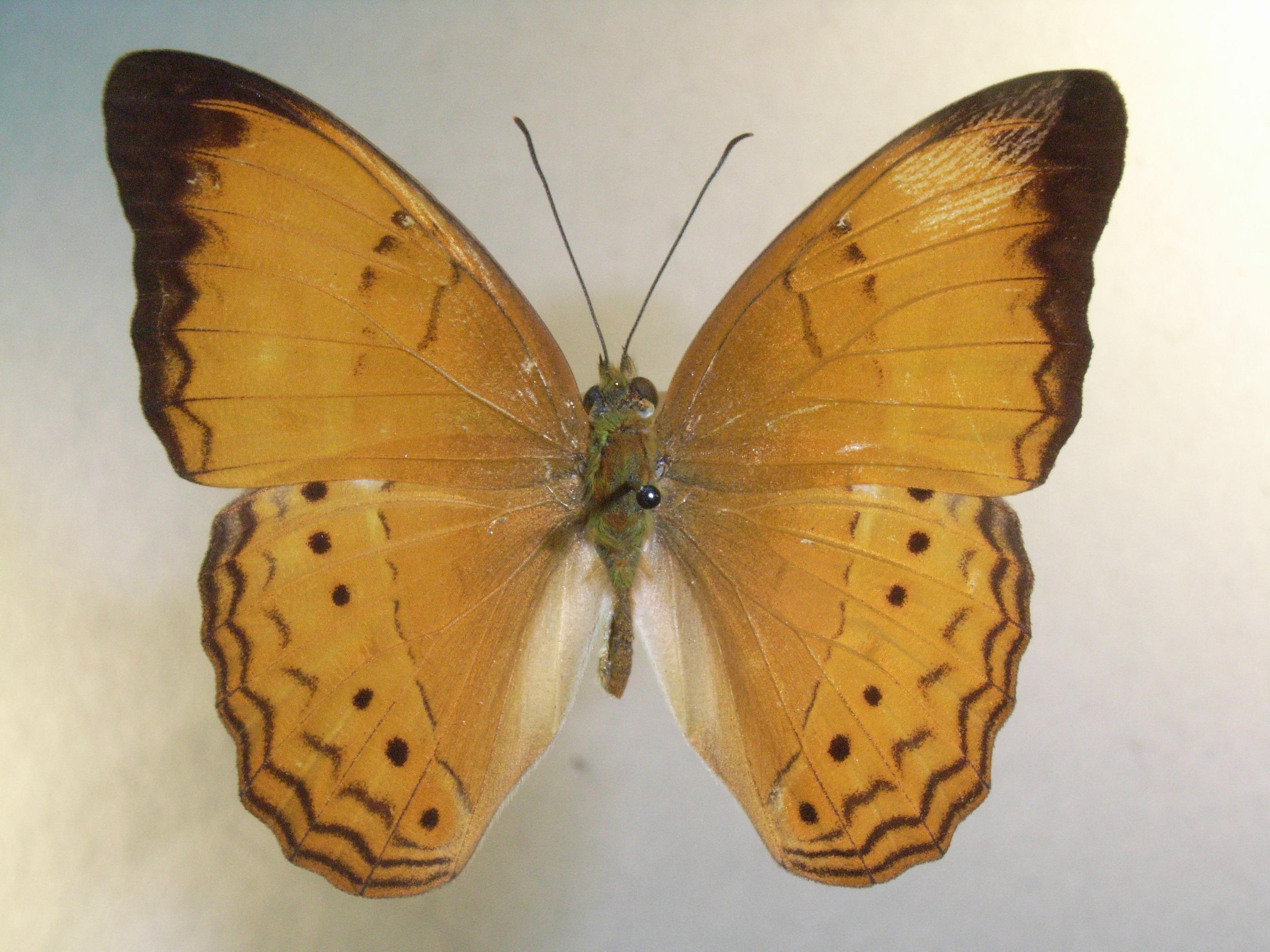
- Cirrochroa malaya malaya

Scientific classification
- Kingdom: Animalia
- Phylum: Arthropoda
- Class: Insecta
- Order: Lepidoptera
- Family: Nymphalidae
- Genus: Cirrochroa
- Species: C. malaya

Binomial name
- Cirrochroa malaya C. Felder & R. Felder, 1860

Synonyms
- Cirrochroa johannes Butler, 1868; Cirrochroa calypso Wallace, 1869; Cirrochroa malaya baluna Fruhstorfer, 1904

= Cirrochroa malaya =

Species of butterfly

Cirrochroa malaya is an Indomalayan species of heliconiine butterfly described by Cajetan and Rudolf Felder in 1860. C. emalea and C. malaya have much in common, as regards the general design, the distribution of the black spots in the median area of the hindwings and the submarginal spots in the apical portion of the forewings beneath. On the other hand malaya differs essentially in the absence of the yellow patch before the apex and more still in the complete want of black scales upon the veins on the upper surface of the forewings. On the under surface of the forewing the discal band increases but slightly as it approaches the costa, while on the hindwing the median band remains unchanged from costa to the anal angle showing no contraction whatsoever. Also the sexual organs are different. Uncus weak, pointed, not curved distally. Valve smaller and shorter, with dorsally incurved appendage.

== Subspecies ==
- Cirrochroa malaya malaya (Peninsular Malaysia, Sumatra)
- Cirrochroa malaya calypso Wallace, 1869 (Borneo)Black distal border on both wings is nearly twice as broad as in malaya and natuna; the submarginal fasciae on hindwing are much farther extended; the white discal bands on the under surface become broader, and there appear in the apical area some large white spots.
- Cirrochroa malaya natuna Fruhstorfer, 1904 (Natuna Island) Forewings less broadly bordered with black, and greater extent of the yellow colour in the subcostal region which causes the black spot before the apex to appear isolated, whereas in malaya it touches the black costal border. The discal spots on the hindwing are twice as large as in malaya and calypso Wall. The ground-colour of both wings is a pale yellow.
