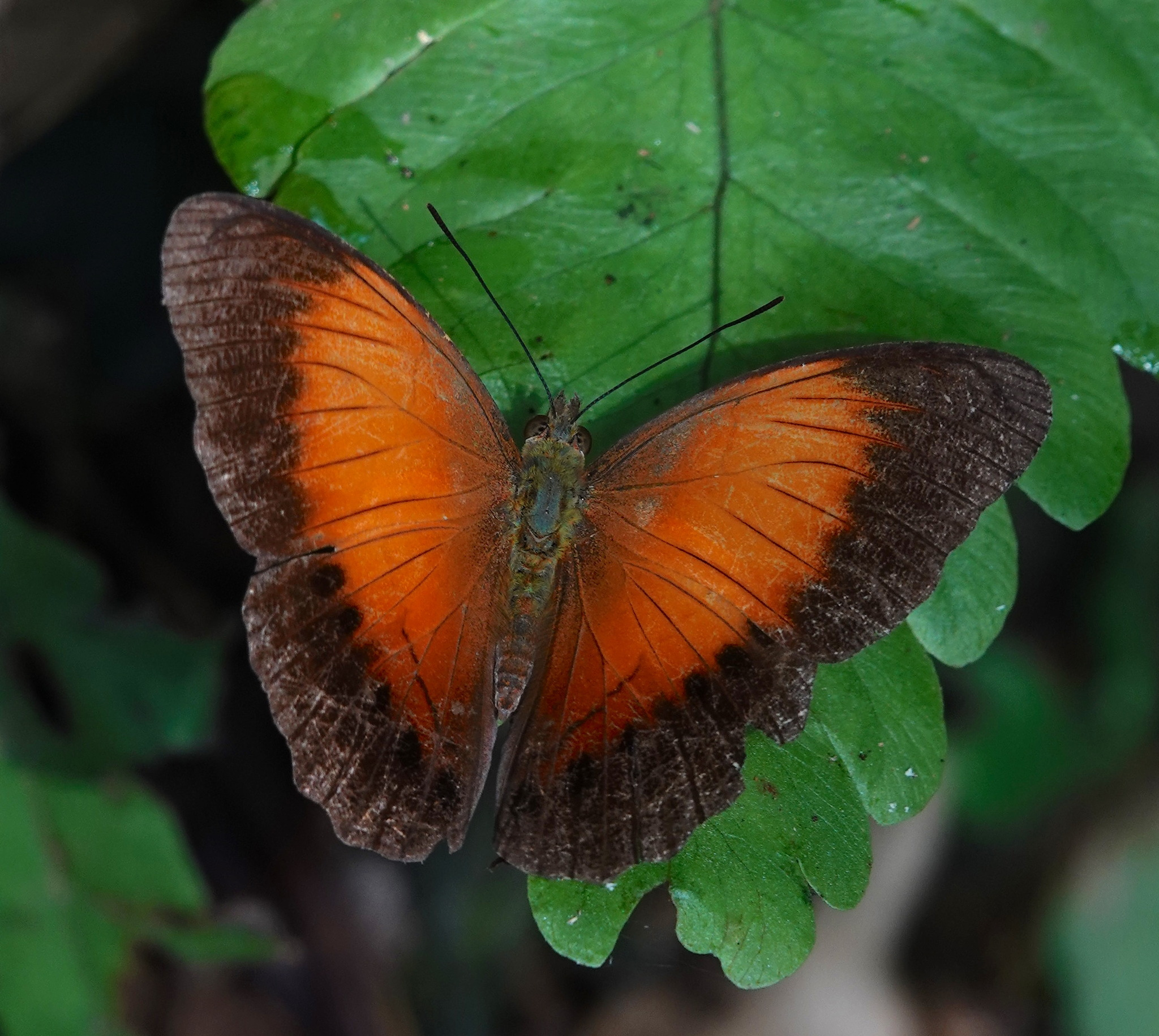
- Cirrochroa clagia, Indonesia

Scientific classification
- Domain: Eukaryota
- Kingdom: Animalia
- Phylum: Arthropoda
- Class: Insecta
- Order: Lepidoptera
- Family: Nymphalidae
- Subfamily: Heliconiinae
- Tribe: Vagrantini
- Genus: Cirrochroa
- Species: C. clagia

Binomial name
- Cirrochroa clagia (Godart, 1823)

Synonyms
- Argynnis clagia Godart, [1824]

= Cirrochroa clagia =

Species of butterfly

Cirrochroa clagia is a species of butterfly of the family Nymphalidae which is found in Indonesia. It was described by Jean-Baptiste Godart in 1823.

== Subspecies ==
- Cirrochroa clagia clagia (Java)
- Cirrochroa clagia clagina Fruhstorfer, 1906 (Sumatra)
