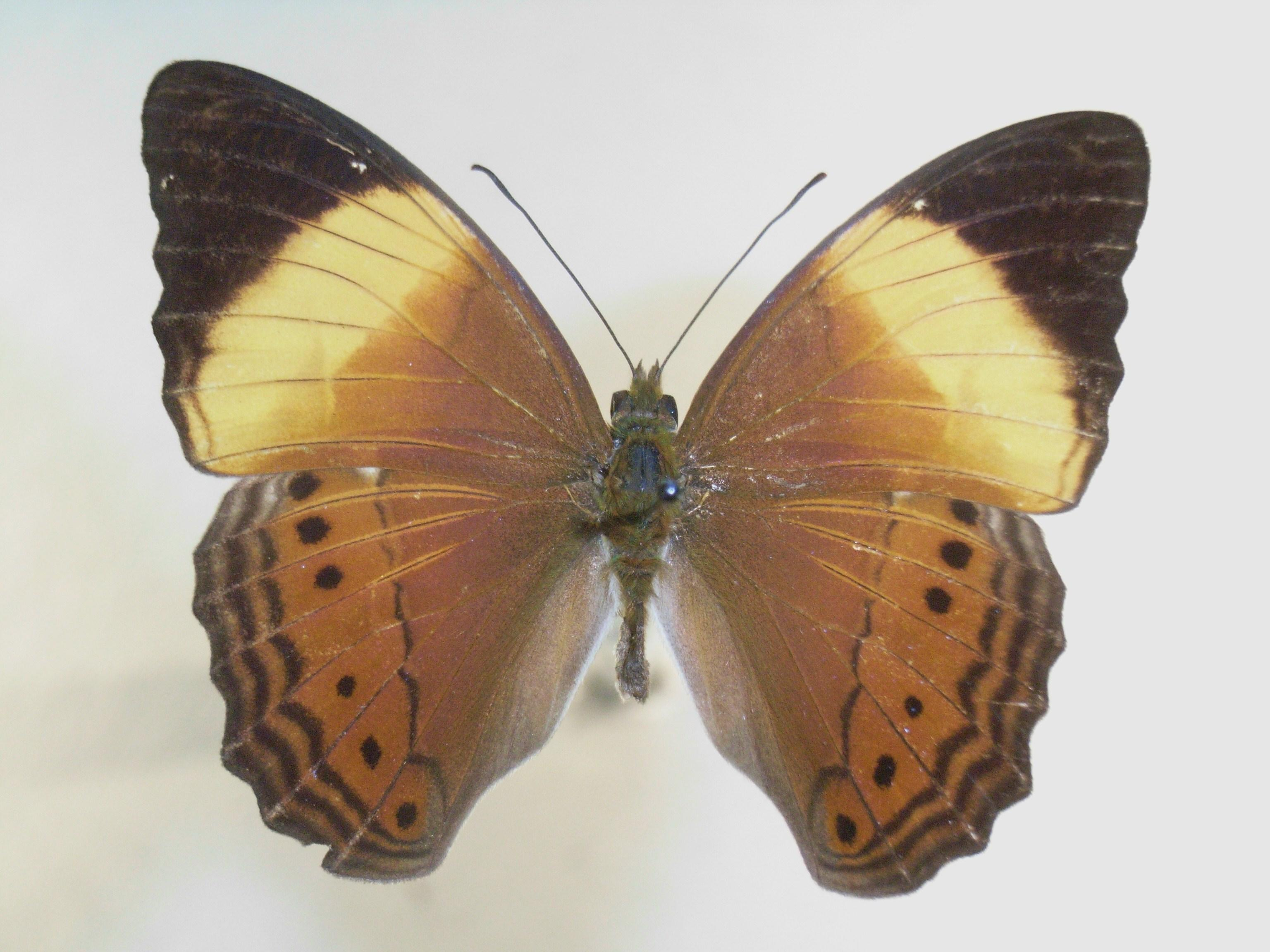
- Cirrochroa orissa orissa

Scientific classification
- Kingdom: Animalia
- Phylum: Arthropoda
- Class: Insecta
- Order: Lepidoptera
- Family: Nymphalidae
- Genus: Cirrochroa
- Species: C. orissa

Binomial name
- Cirrochroa orissa C. Felder & R. Felder, 1860

= Cirrochroa orissa =

Species of butterfly

Cirrochroa orissa, the banded yeoman, is an Indomalayan species of heliconiine butterfly described by Cajetan and Rudolf Felder in 1860.

Hindwings along the subcostal nervules with yellow sexual strigae, which in the basal half accompany also the submedian and lower median, being quite conspicuous upon the red-brown ground-colour.On the forewing 2 or 3 radial stripes encroach upon the black colour of the apical portion. On the under surface the predominating colour is yellow, the distal half of the hindwings reddish-brown. The fore wings are traversed by a broad cream-coloured diagonal band; hindwings similar so those of Cirrochroa satellita, but with a more sharply defined longitudinal band having an intense lustre of mother-of-pearl.

== Subspecies ==
- Cirrochroa orissa orissa (Thailand, Peninsular Malaysia, Singapore)
- Cirrochroa orissa orissides Fruhstorfer, 1906 (Borneo)

See also Cirrochroa orissa chione Riley & Godfrey, 1921 (southern Indo-China), usually treated as Cirrochroa chione Riley & Godfrey, 1921
