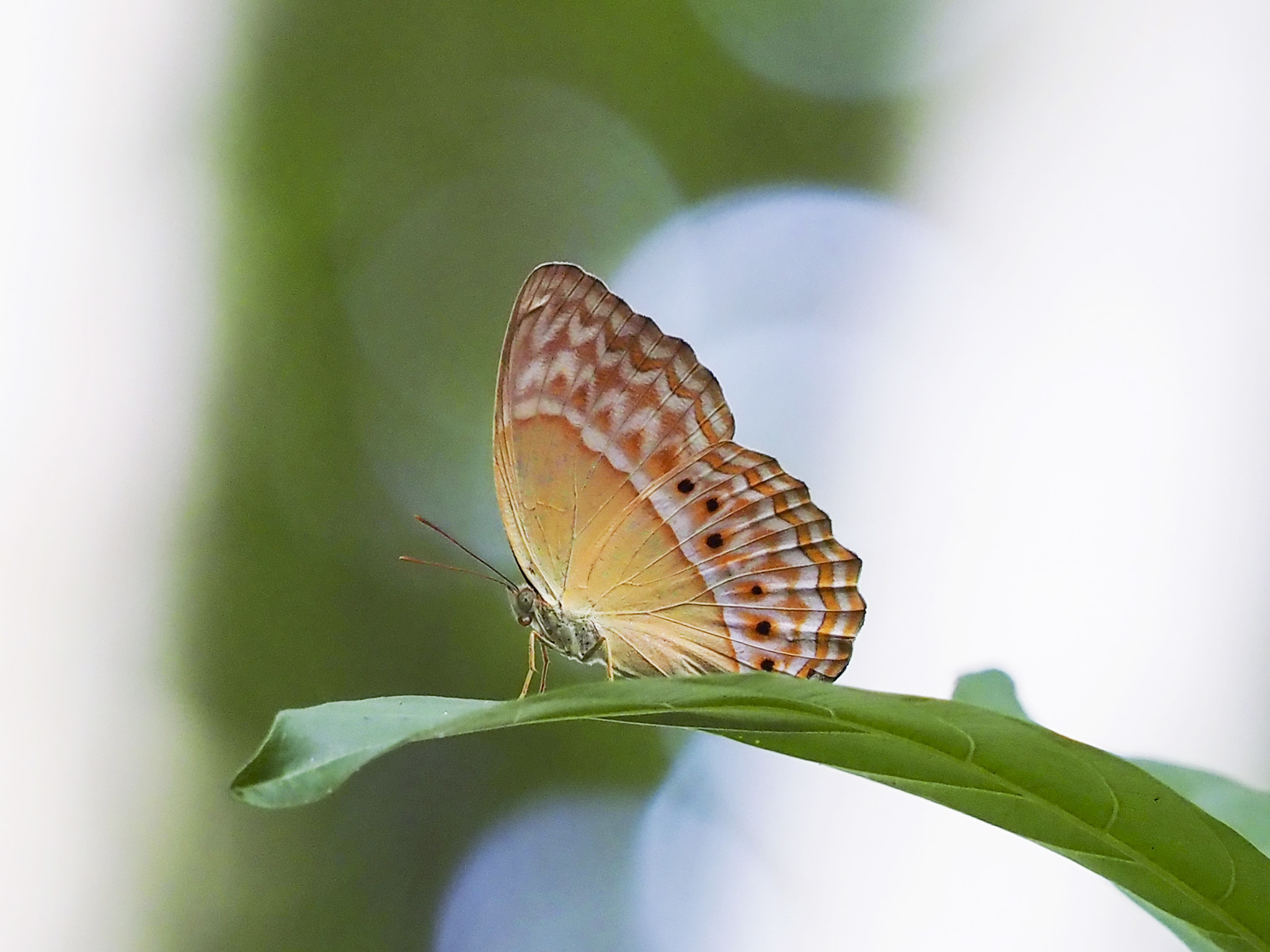
- Cirrochroa eremita, Indonesia

Scientific classification
- Domain: Eukaryota
- Kingdom: Animalia
- Phylum: Arthropoda
- Class: Insecta
- Order: Lepidoptera
- Family: Nymphalidae
- Subfamily: Heliconiinae
- Tribe: Vagrantini
- Genus: Cirrochroa
- Species: C. eremita

Binomial name
- Cirrochroa eremita Tsukada, 1985

= Cirrochroa eremita =

Species of butterfly

Cirrochroa eremita is a species of butterfly of the family Nymphalidae. It was described by Etsuzo Tsukada in 1985. It is found on northern Sulawesi, Indonesia.
