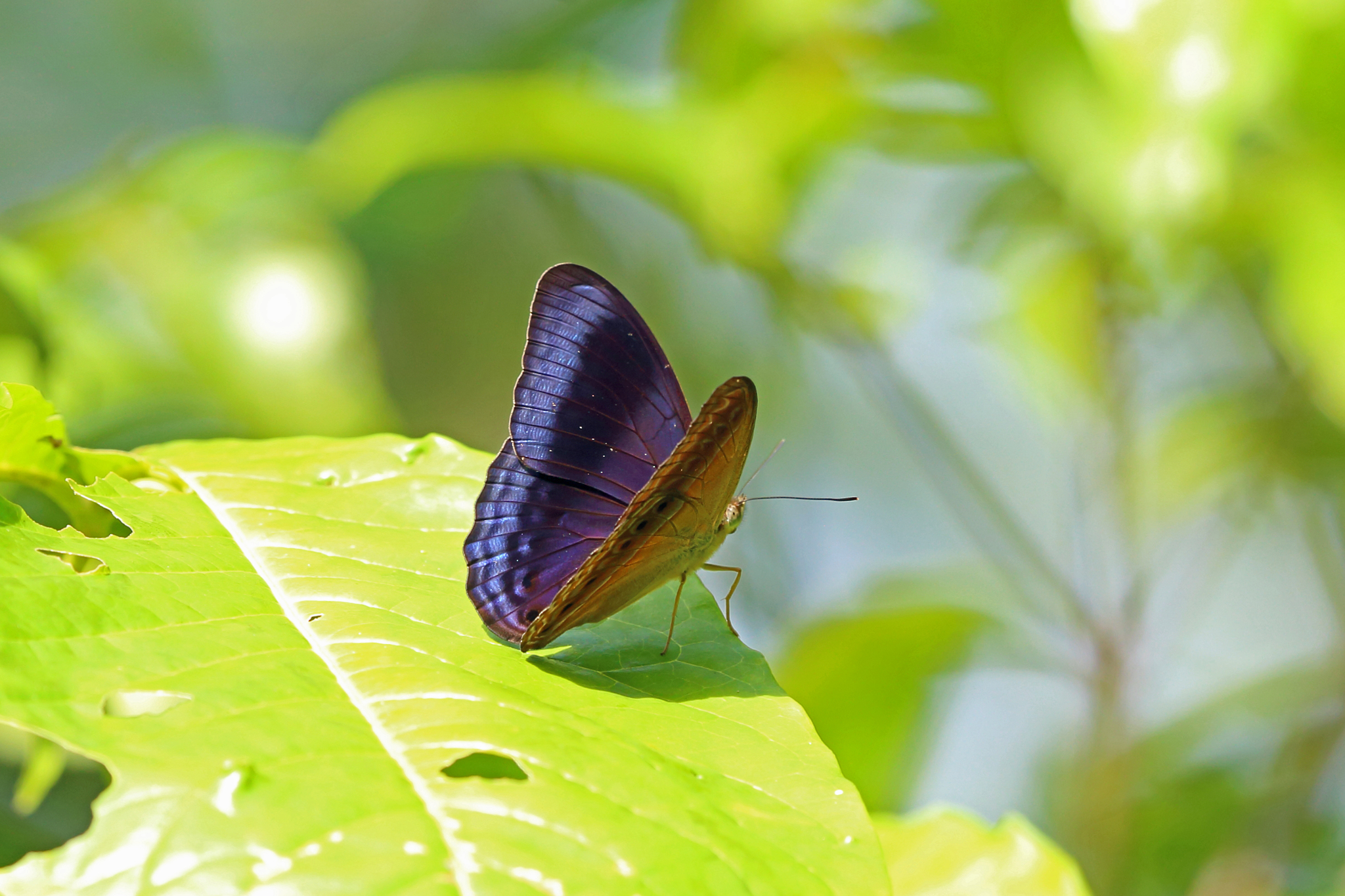
- Cirrochroa imperatrix, Indonesia

Scientific classification
- Domain: Eukaryota
- Kingdom: Animalia
- Phylum: Arthropoda
- Class: Insecta
- Order: Lepidoptera
- Family: Nymphalidae
- Subfamily: Heliconiinae
- Tribe: Vagrantini
- Genus: Cirrochroa
- Species: C. imperatrix

Binomial name
- Cirrochroa imperatrix Grose-Smith, 1894

= Cirrochroa imperatrix =

Species of butterfly

Cirrochroa imperatrix is a species of butterfly of the family Nymphalidae. It was described by Henley Grose-Smith in 1894. It is found on Biak and Supiori, and is possibly also present on Sulawesi, Indonesia and New Guinea.
