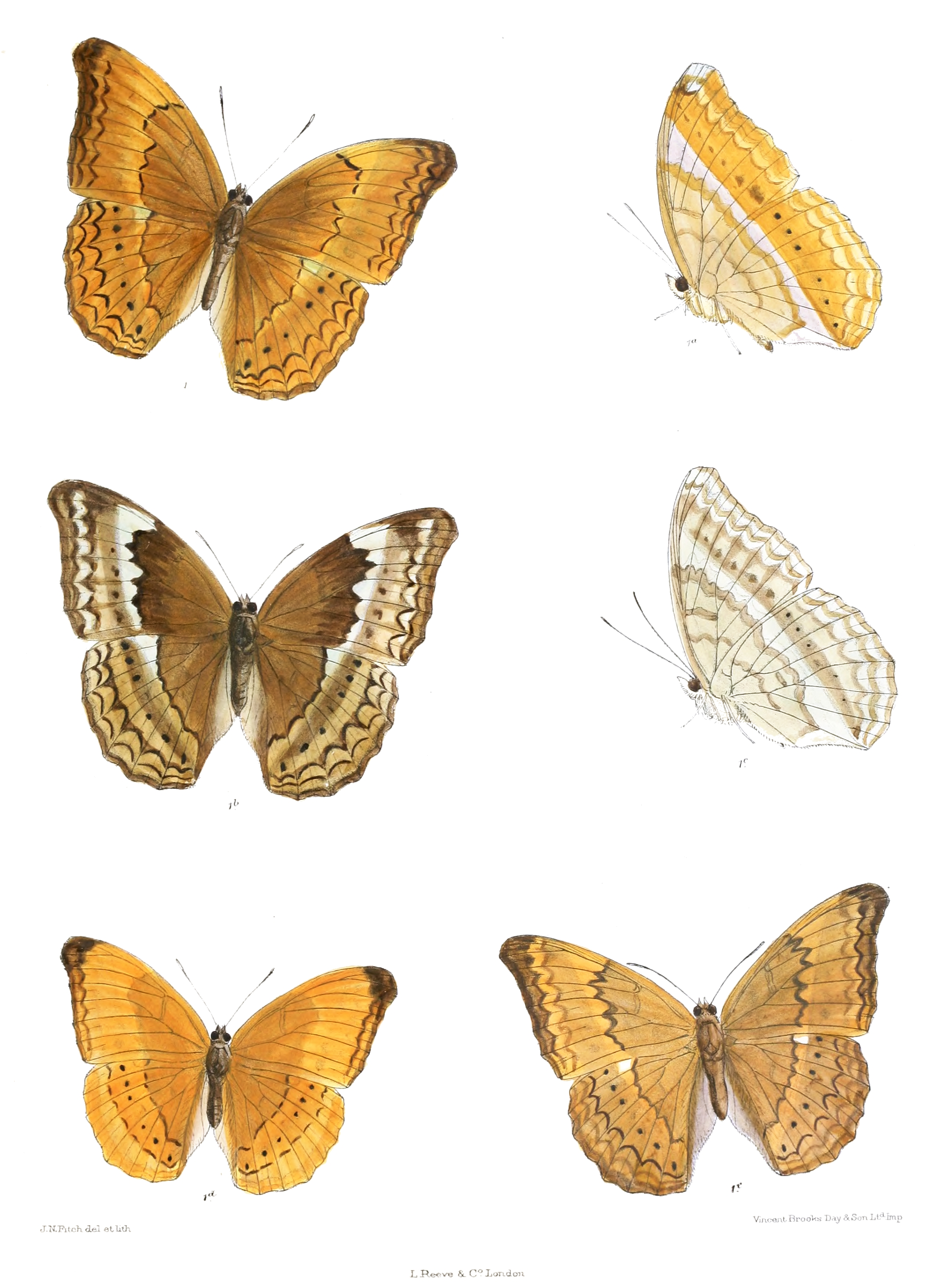

Scientific classification
- Kingdom: Animalia
- Phylum: Arthropoda
- Class: Insecta
- Order: Lepidoptera
- Family: Nymphalidae
- Genus: Cirrochroa
- Species: C. aoris

Binomial name
- Cirrochroa aoris Doubleday, 1847

= Cirrochroa aoris =

Large yeoman

Species of butterfly

Cirrochroa aoris, the large yeoman, is a species of nymphalid butterfly found in forested areas of tropical South Asia and Southeast Asia.

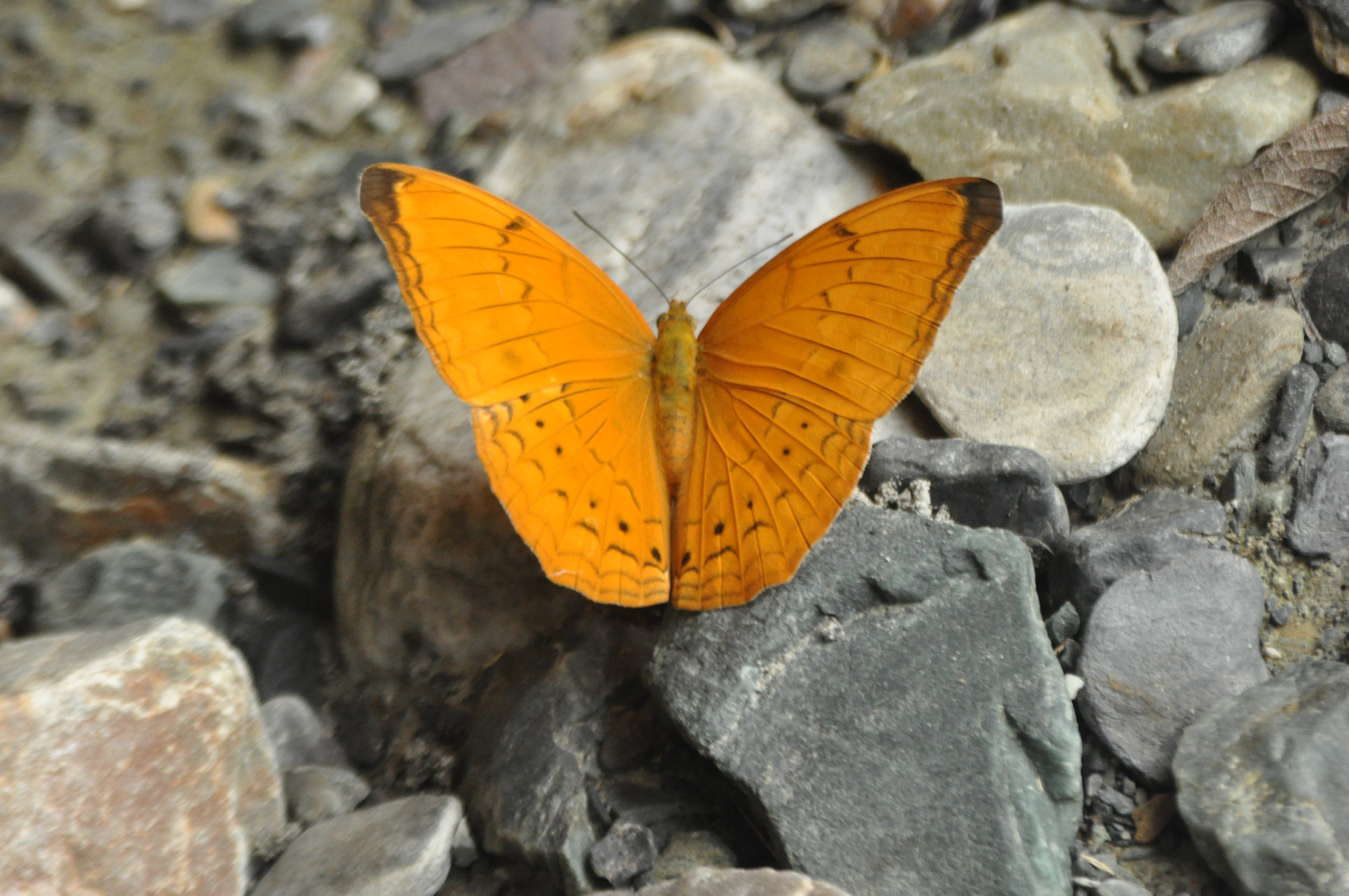

It is very similar to Cirrochroa tyche. There are slight differences in wing shape (more irregular/toothed in aoris), ground colour variations (brown/blue hues in aoris), and distinctive markings, often requiring close inspection of wing spots and edges.

== See also ==
- List of butterflies of India (Nymphalidae)
