= Cirrochroa menones =

Scientific classification
- Domain: Eukaryota
- Kingdom: Animalia
- Phylum: Arthropoda
- Class: Insecta
- Order: Lepidoptera
- Family: Nymphalidae
- Genus: Cirrochroa
- Species: C. menones

Binomial name
- Cirrochroa menones Semper, 1888

Species of butterfly

Cirrochroa menones is a heliconiine butterfly endemic to island of Mindanao in the Philippines.
