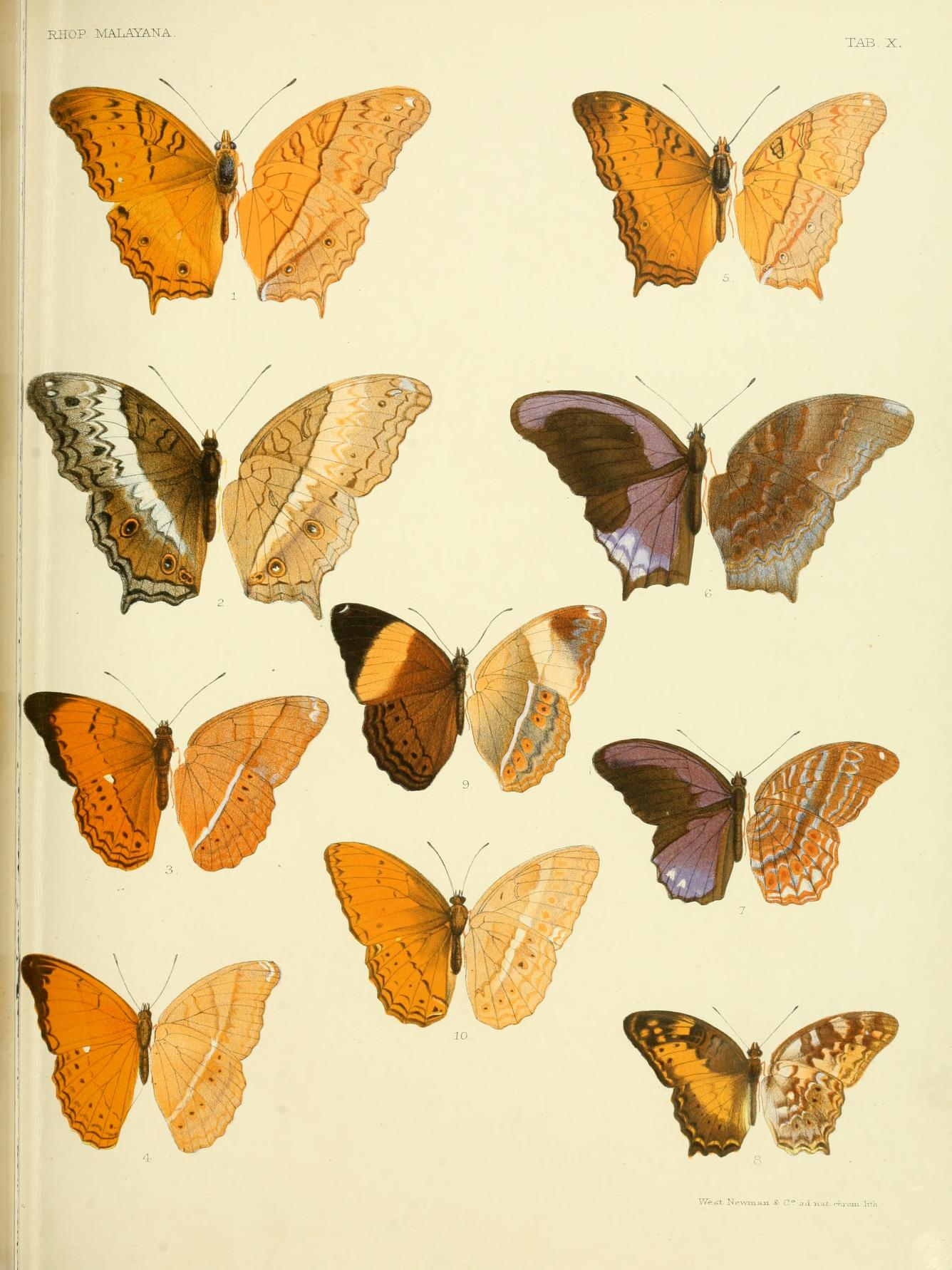
- Terinos atlita teuthras in William Lucas Distant's Rhopalocera Malayana

Scientific classification
- Kingdom: Animalia
- Phylum: Arthropoda
- Class: Insecta
- Order: Lepidoptera
- Family: Nymphalidae
- Genus: Terinos
- Species: T. atlita

Binomial name
- Terinos atlita (Fabricius, 1787)

Synonyms
- Papilio atlita Fabricius, 1787; Terinos atlita albonotata Moulton, 1915; Terinos teuthras Hewitson, 1862; Terinos viola Wallace, 1869; Terinos militium lioneli Fruhstorfer, 1906; Terinos lioneli Fruhstorfer, 1906; Terinos falcata Fruhstorfer, 1898; Terinos fulminans Butler, 1869; Terinos phalaris Weymer, 1887

= Terinos atlita =

Species of butterfly

Terinos atlita is a butterfly in the family Nymphalidae. It was described by Johann Christian Fabricius in 1787. It is found in the Indomalayan realm.

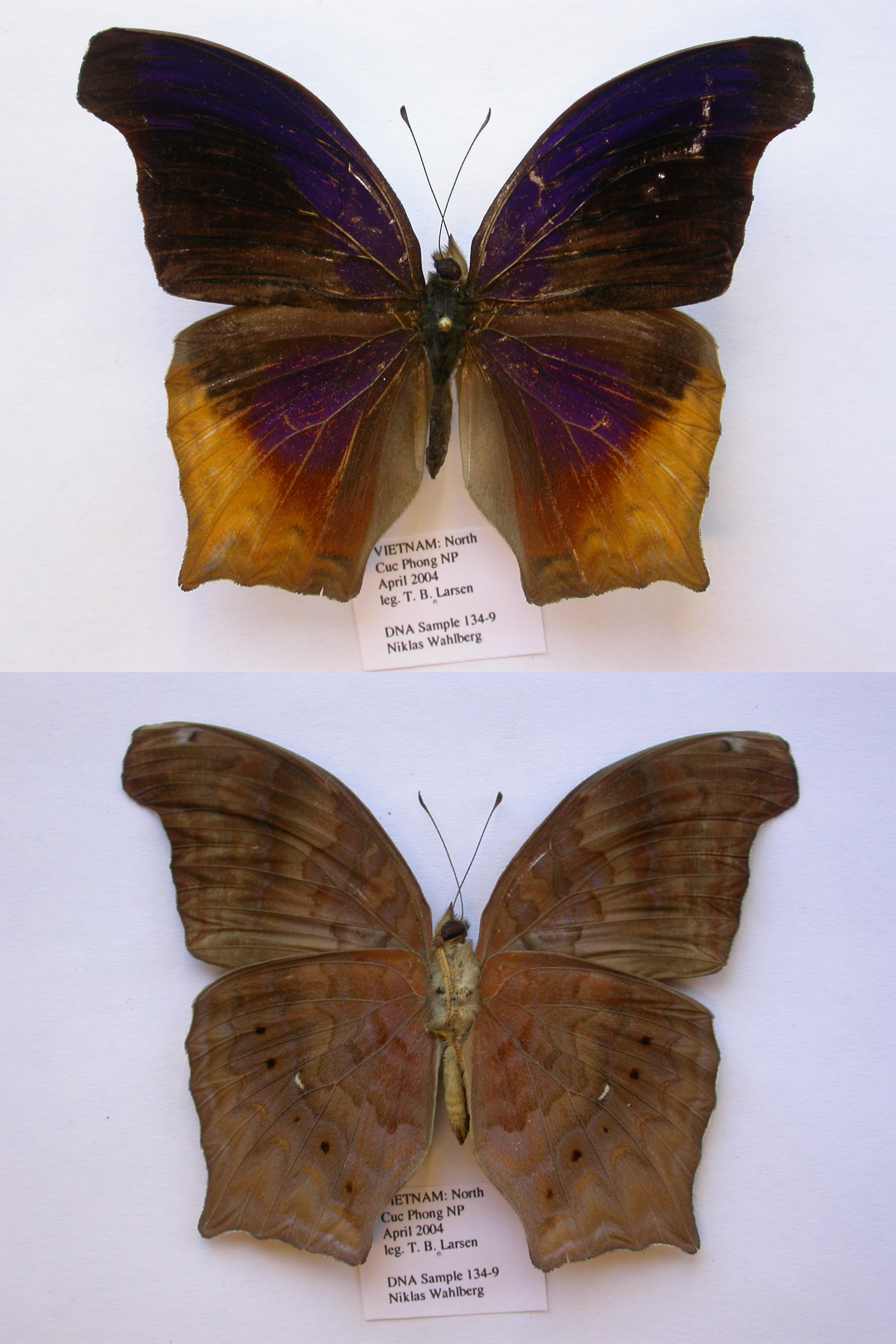

It is beneath not so brightly red-brown as clarissa; the submarginal band which traverses the wings, is reddish or yellow, less strongly undulate. The hindwings lack moreover the white streak which in clarissa is enclosed between the nervules distally to the cell; in the females the forewings show at the anal angle a whitish patch which in clarissa appears on the hindwings. In the shape of the wings all the forms of atlita resemble rather T. clarissa militum. It is not scarce in the wooded low-lands in north-eastern Sumatra; several specimens from the Bovenlanden above Padang in western Sumatra in Fruhstorfer coll.

== Subspecies ==
- T. a. atlita (Sumatra)
- T. a. teuthras Hewitson, 1862 (Peninsular Malaysia, Langkawi)
- T. a. militum Oberthür, 1877 (Thailand - Indochina)
- T. a. falcata Fruhstorfer, 1898 (Siam)
- T. a. fulminans Butler, 1869 (Borneo)
- T. a. guangxienis Chou, 1994 (Guangxi)
