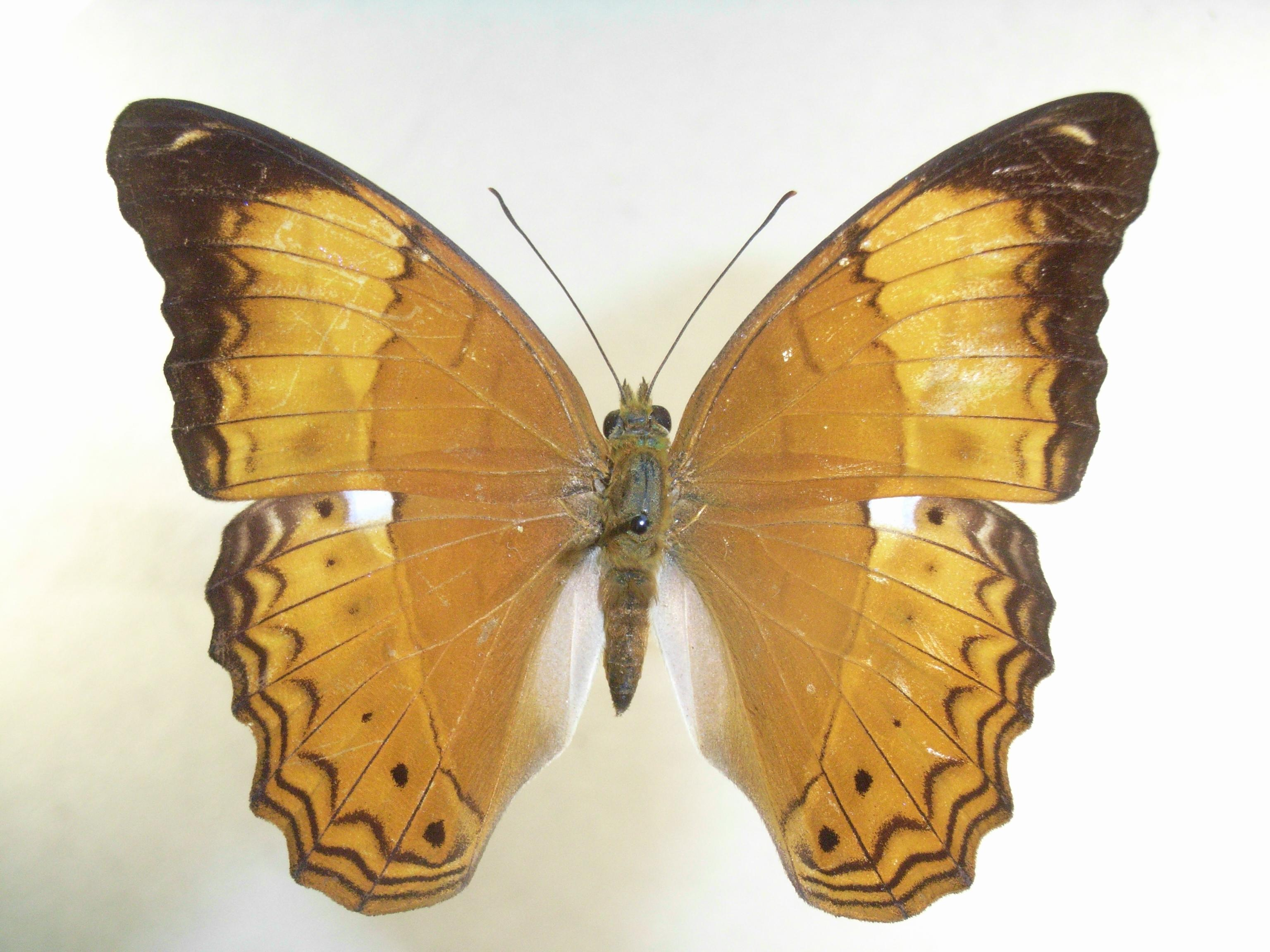

Scientific classification
- Kingdom: Animalia
- Phylum: Arthropoda
- Class: Insecta
- Order: Lepidoptera
- Family: Nymphalidae
- Genus: Cirrochroa
- Species: C. emalea

Binomial name
- Cirrochroa emalea (Guérin-Méneville, 1843)

Synonyms
- Argynnis emalea Guérin-Méneville, 1843; [?]Cirrochroa bajadeta bajadetina Fruhstorfer, 1906

= Cirrochroa emalea =

Species of butterfly

Cirrochroa emalea, the Malay yeoman, is an Indomalayan species of heliconiine butterfly described by Félix Édouard Guérin-Méneville in 1843. Very similar to Cirrochroa tyche but more rusty orange, a distinct constricted silvery band on the underside hindwing with a larger spot, and broader black markings, while tyche is tawny orange with a narrower, more uniform silvery band and smaller hindwing spots. Identication requires close examination of subjective? detail.

== Subspecies ==
Several possible subspecies have been proposed, including:

- Cirrochroa emalea bajadeta Moore, [1858] Indonesia (Java)
- Cirrochroa emalea emalea (Guérin-Méneville, 1843) Thailand, Malaysia (Peninsular)
- Cirrochroa emalea lapaona Kheil, 1884 Indonesia (Nias)
- Cirrochroa emalea martini Fruhstorfer, 1906 Indonesia (Sumatra)
- [?]Cirrochroa emalea mirandai (Corbet, 1942)
- Cirrochroa emalea ravana Moore, [1858] Indonesia (Borneo)
