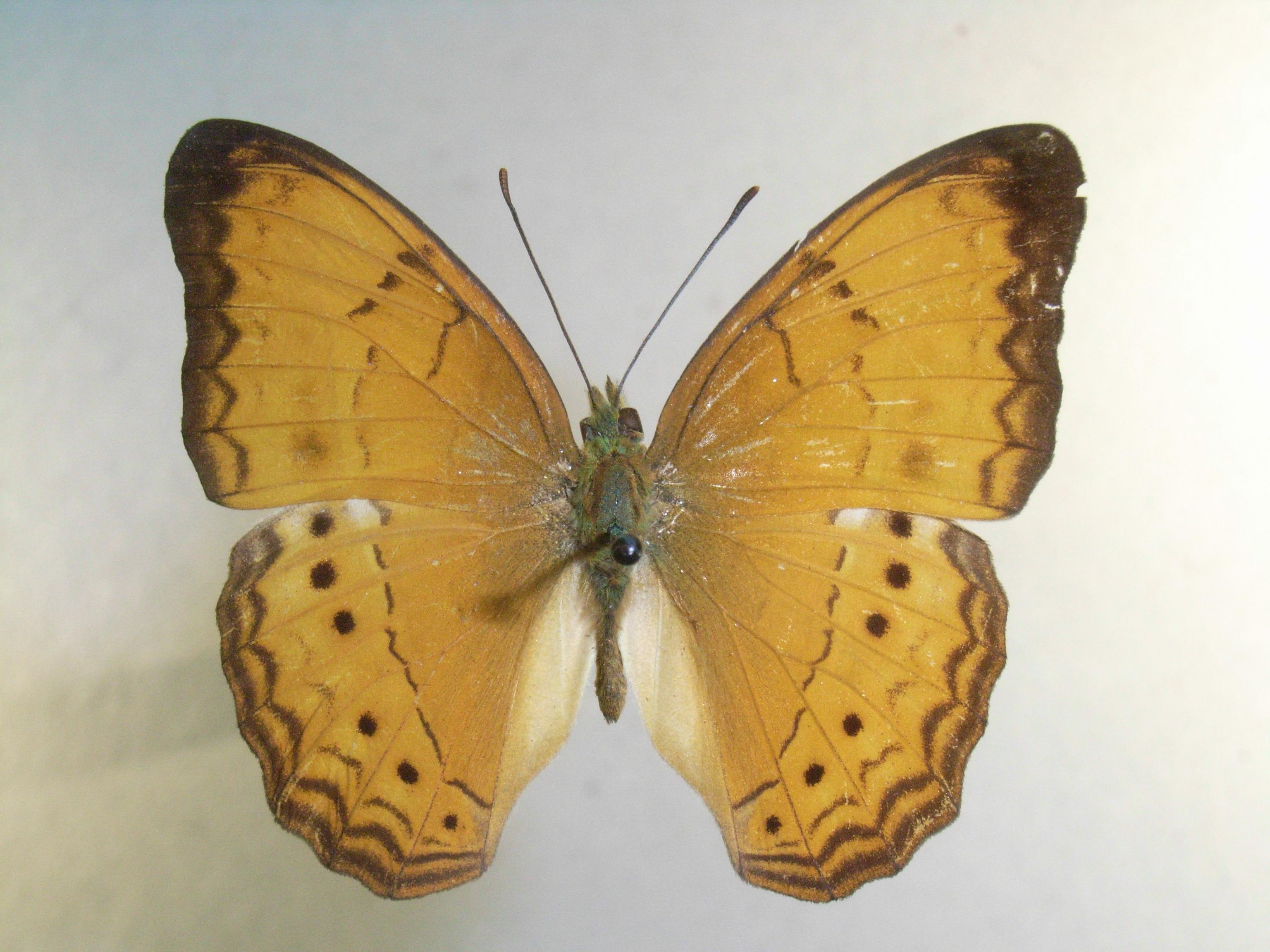
- Cirrochroa surya siamensis

Scientific classification
- Kingdom: Animalia
- Phylum: Arthropoda
- Class: Insecta
- Order: Lepidoptera
- Family: Nymphalidae
- Genus: Cirrochroa
- Species: C. surya

Binomial name
- Cirrochroa surya Moore, [1879]

= Cirrochroa surya =

Species of butterfly

Cirrochroa surya is an Indomalayan species of heliconiine butterfly described by Frederic Moore in 1879. It may be distinguished from C. tyche by its brighter orange ground colour, especially in males, with more defined silvery spots on the hindwing underside and broader dark margins.

== Subspecies ==
- Cirrochroa surya surya (central to southern Burma, Mergui Archipelago)
- Cirrochroa surya siamensis Fruhstorfer, 1906 (Thailand to northern Peninsular Malaysia, possibly Indo-China)
