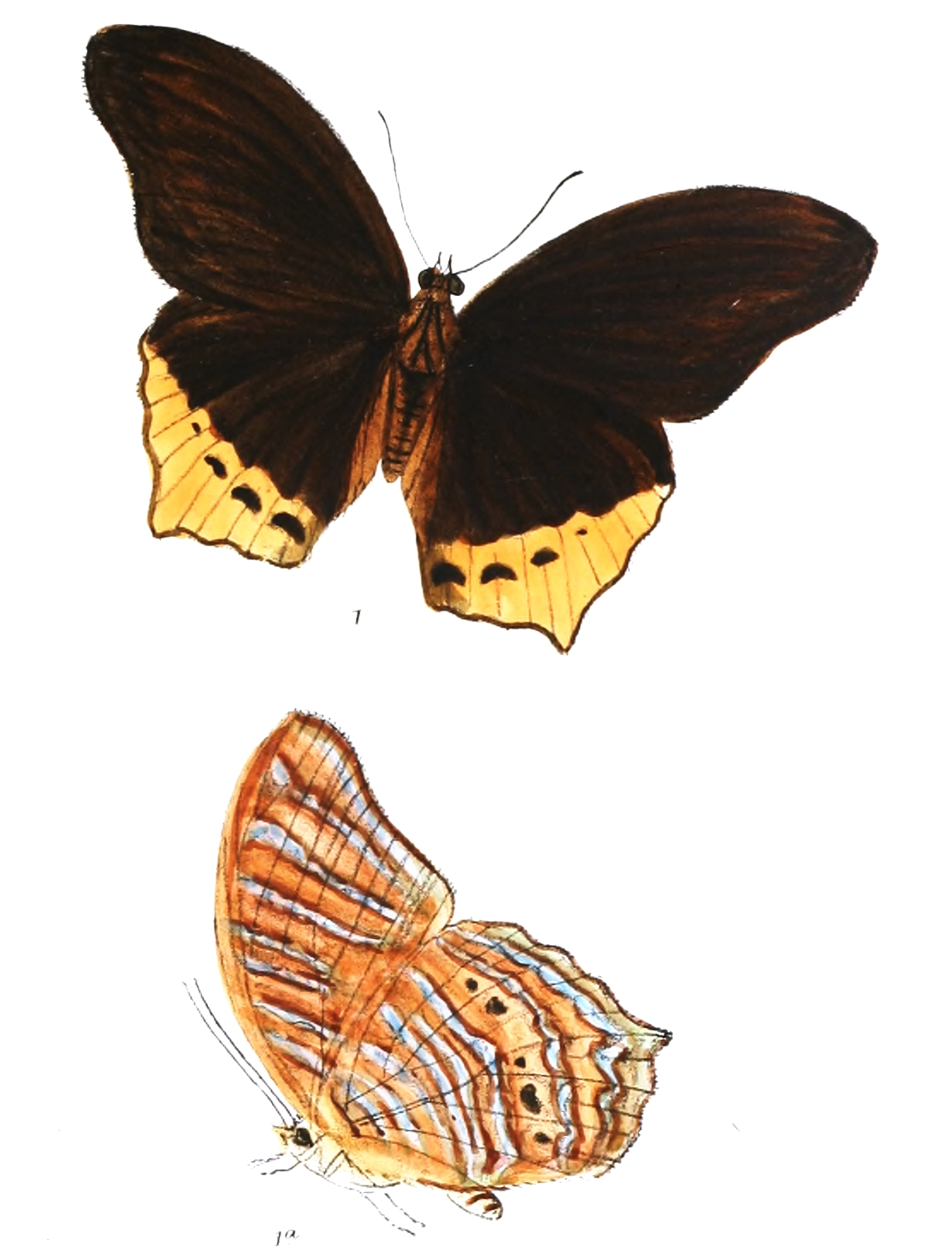

Scientific classification
- Kingdom: Animalia
- Phylum: Arthropoda
- Class: Insecta
- Order: Lepidoptera
- Family: Nymphalidae
- Genus: Terinos
- Species: T. clarissa

Binomial name
- Terinos clarissa Boisduval, 1836

Synonyms
- Terinos nympha Wallace, 1869; Terinos lucia Staudinger, 1889; Terinos lucilla Butler, 1870

= Terinos clarissa =

Species of butterfly

Terinos clarissa is an Indomalayan is a butterfly of the family Nymphalidae (Heliconiinae). The larva feeds on Homalium, Rinorea.

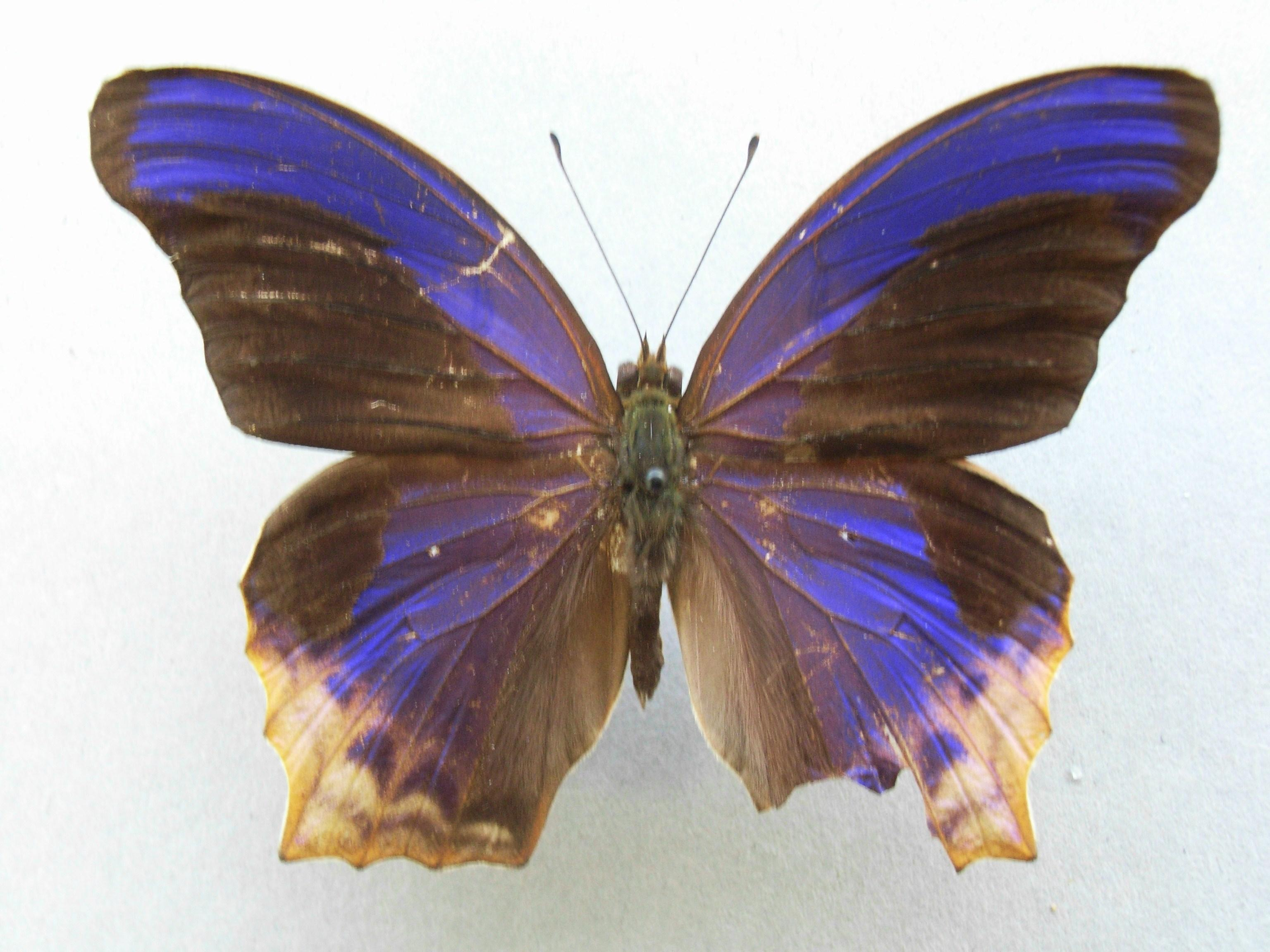
T. c. malayana

Male above is a most magnificent, blue-violet velvety lustre.clarissa resembles above malayana (108 c) but the distal margin of the hindwing, while not quite so broad, is of a yellowish red colour. The predominant colour of the female is black; the forewings are dark blue at the base, with a narrow median band of the same colour. The hindwings are towards the anal angle yellow, proximally with a slight reddish tinge; the yellowish anal border is confined by an oblique blue intermedian band, and the anal area contains in addition two indistinct crescents as well as two circular patches of violet. The underside is in the male redbrown, with white longitudinal bands having a slight violet tinge, and with a strongly undulate reddish-yellow submarginal fascia, which latter is met with in all the subspecies. The female is chiefly gray with whitish anal area and a pale yellow submarginal band.

== Subspecies ==
- T. c. clarissa (Sumatra, Borneo, Malaya)
- T. c. malayana Fruhstorfer, 1906 (Malaya)
- T. c. dinnaga Fruhstorfer, 1906 (Sumatra)
- T. c. aurensis Eliot, 1978 (Pulau Aur)
- T. c. nympha Wallace, 1869 (Borneo)
- T. c. bangueyana Fruhstorfer, 1912 (Banggi, Bangquey Island)
- T. c. lucia Staudinger, 1889 (Palawan)
- T. c. luciella Fruhstorfer, 1912 (Balabac Island)
- T. c. lucilla Butler, 1870 (Philippines: Mindanao)
- T. c. ludmilla Staudinger, 1898 (Sanghie)
