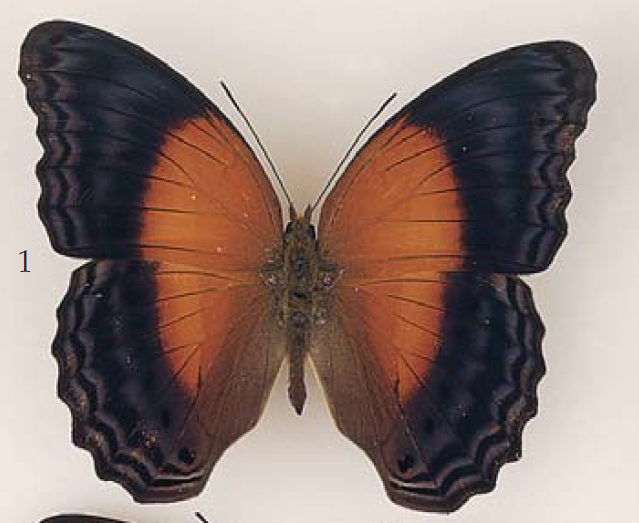

Scientific classification
- Domain: Eukaryota
- Kingdom: Animalia
- Phylum: Arthropoda
- Class: Insecta
- Order: Lepidoptera
- Family: Nymphalidae
- Genus: Cirrochroa
- Species: C. thule

Binomial name
- Cirrochroa thule Felder & Felder, 1867

= Cirrochroa thule =

Species of butterfly

Cirrochroa thule, is a species of nymphalid butterfly found in Sulawesi.

The species was described from a male specimen in the collection owned by Godert van der Capellen.

== Subspecies ==
- C. t. massalia Fruhstorfer, 1906
- C. t. thule Felder & Felder, 1867
