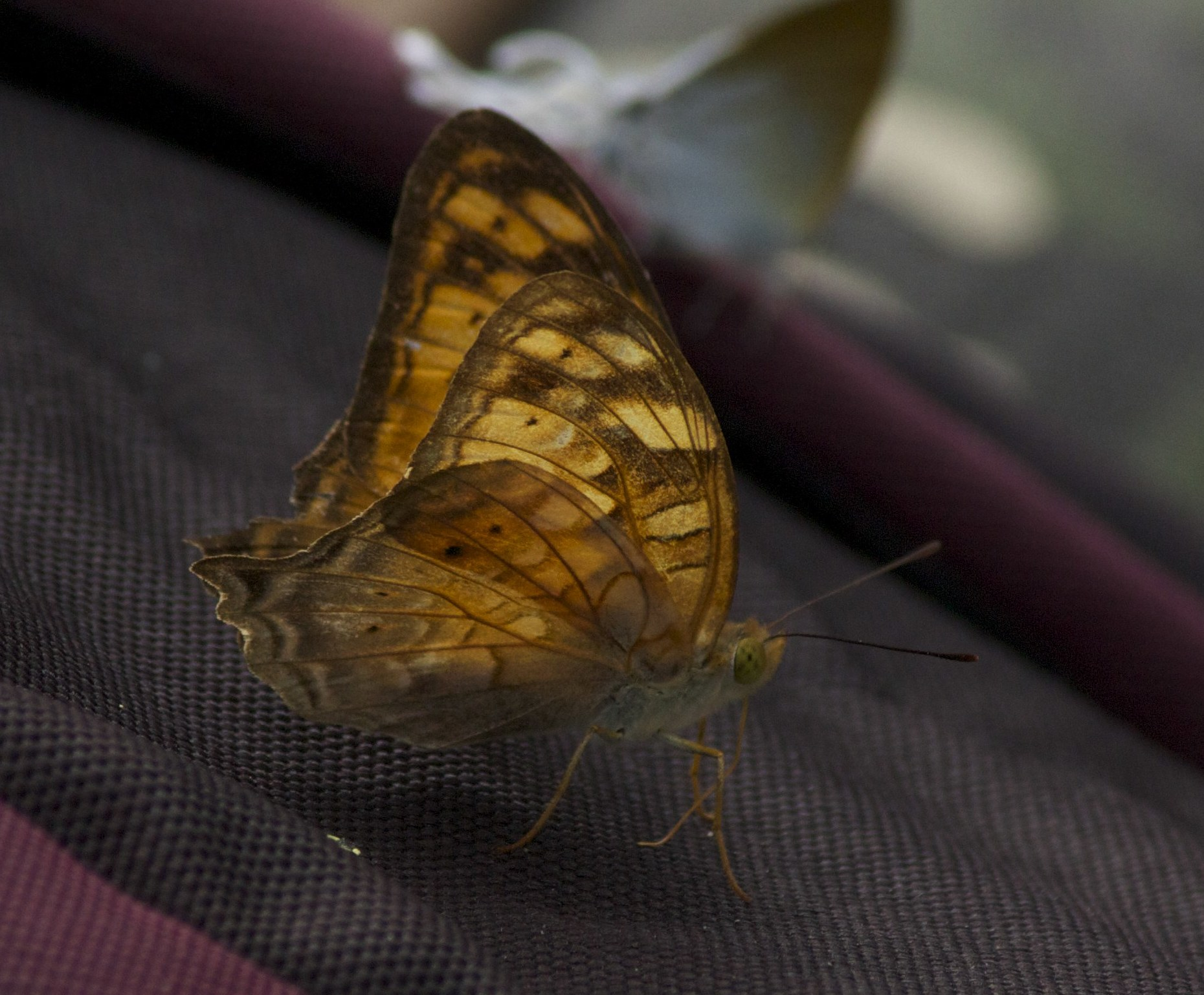
- Ventral view

Scientific classification
- Kingdom: Animalia
- Phylum: Arthropoda
- Clade: Pancrustacea
- Class: Insecta
- Order: Lepidoptera
- Family: Nymphalidae
- Subfamily: Heliconiinae
- Tribe: Vagrantini
- Genus: Vagrans; Hemming, 1934
- Species: V. egista

Binomial name
- Vagrans egista (Cramer, 1780)

= Vagrans =

Genus of butterflies

Vagrans is monotypic genus with the species vagrant (Vagrans egista), a species of nymphalid butterfly found in forested areas of tropical South Asia and Southeast Asia.

== Description ==
=== Race sinha ===
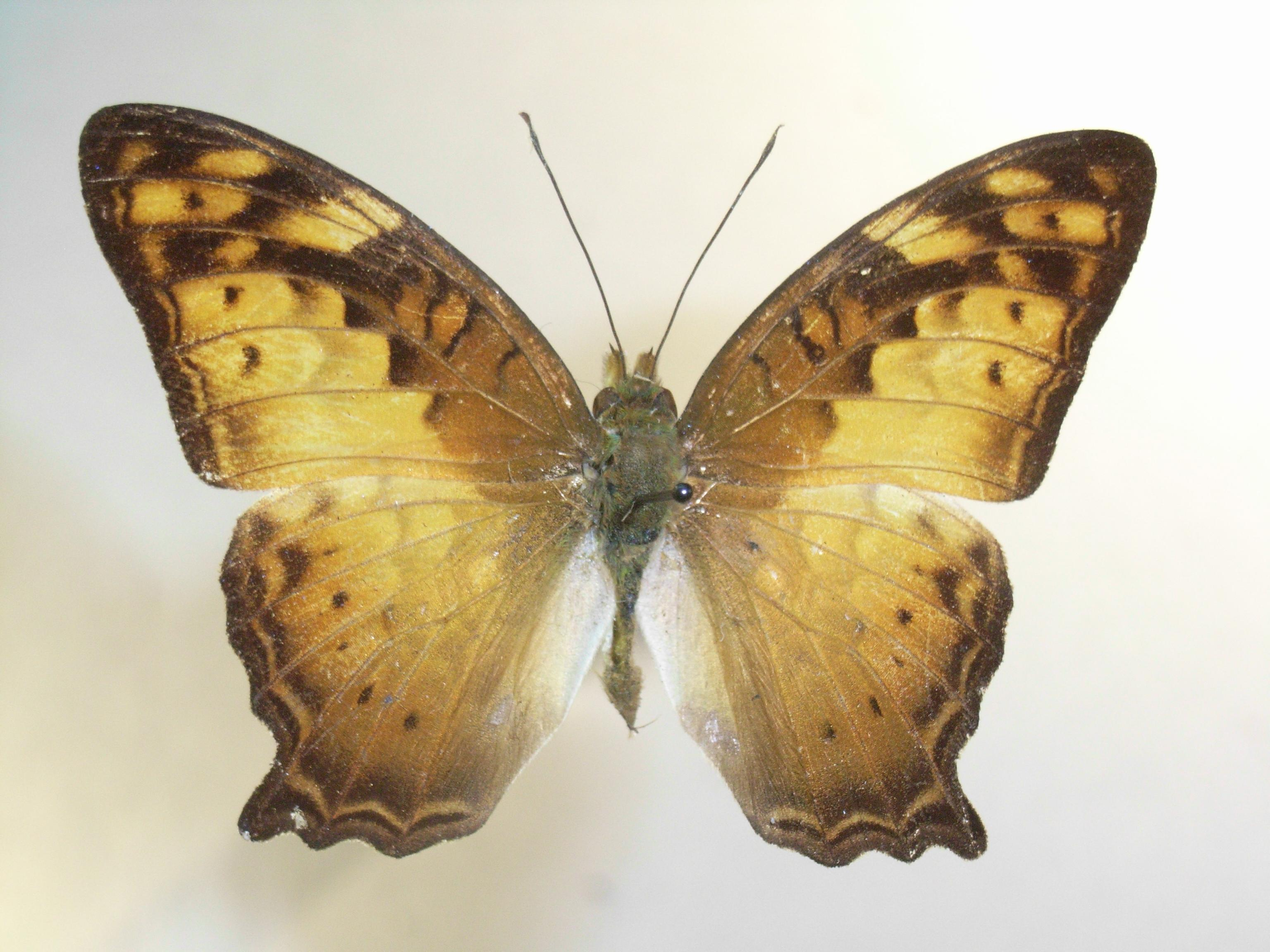
Race macromalayana

The upperside of the wings are rich ochre yellow. The forewing is dusky brown towards the base and near the tornus. The cel has three black sinuous lines and there is a line along the discocellulars. The interspaces beyond the apex of the cell are dark brown, the dark colour continues out in interspace 4 and joins a broad oblique short band from the costa. The dusky-brown shading at bases of interspaces 1–3 darkens outwards; Other marks include a transverse postdiscal series of dark brown spots, interrupted by large quadrate dark brown marks in interspace 4 and below costa; a subterminal lunular line and a broad terminal band dark brown or black. Hindwing is shaded toward the posterior and outer half by dusky brown and has a postdiscal row of dark brown spots, followed by a subterminal series of broad lunules and a broad terminal band dark brown or black. Underside of forewing has the basal area purplish brown, posterior half ochraceous yellow; the cell is crossed by three sinuous dark brown lines, the innermost of the three bordered inwardly with purplish white, the space between the outer two also pale purplish, the interspaces beyond the apex of the cell very pale ochre, followed by a transverse series of purple-white lunules, a row of dark brown spots, a subterminal inner series of dark ochre lunules and an outer dark ochre transverse line. Hindwing: the disc purplish brown, lightening to pale purple broadly along the dorsal and tornal areas; an obscure subbasal, dark brown, highly sinuous and irregular transverse line, followed by a sinuous transverse series of pale purple hmules, a discal series of dark ferruginous spots, obscure postdiscal and more clearly defined subterminal lines of dark lunules; the terminal margin narrowly brown. Antennae, head, thorax and abdomen dark ochraceous, the thorax and abdomen beneath buffy white.

The wingspan is 64–71 mm.

Found mainly in the Sub-Himalayan zone from Margalla hills to Assam, extending into the Malayan region east to the Philippines. Also noted from the Eastern Ghats.

== Subspecies ==
- Vagrans egista admiralia (Rothschild, 1915) – Bismarck Archipelago
- Vagrans egista bowdenia (Butler, [1874]) – Tonga
- Vagrans egista brixia (Fruhstorfer, 1912) – Philippines
- Vagrans egista buruana (Fruhstorfer, 1904)
- Vagrans egista creaghana (Pryer & Cator, 1894) – Borneo
- Vagrans egista egista (Cramer, [1780])
- Vagrans egista eda (Fruhstorfer, 1904)
- Vagrans egista elvira (Fruhstorfer, 1904)
- Vagrans egista hebridina (Waterhouse, 1920) – New Hebrides
- Vagrans egista macromalayana (Fruhstorfer, 1912) – Malaysia
- Vagrans egista nupta (Staudinger, 1889)
- Vagrans egista obiana (Fruhstorfer, 1904)
- Vagrans egista offaka (Fruhstorfer, 1904)
- Vagrans egista orfeda (Fruhstorfer, 1904)
- Vagrans egista propinqua (Miskin, 1884)
- Vagrans egista scyllaria (Fruhstorfer, 1912) – New Caledonia
- Vagrans egista shortlandia (Fruhstorfer, 1912)
- Vagrans egista sinha (Kollar, [1844]) – India, Thailand, Myanmar and China
- Vagrans egista vitiensis (Waterhouse, 1920) – Fiji
