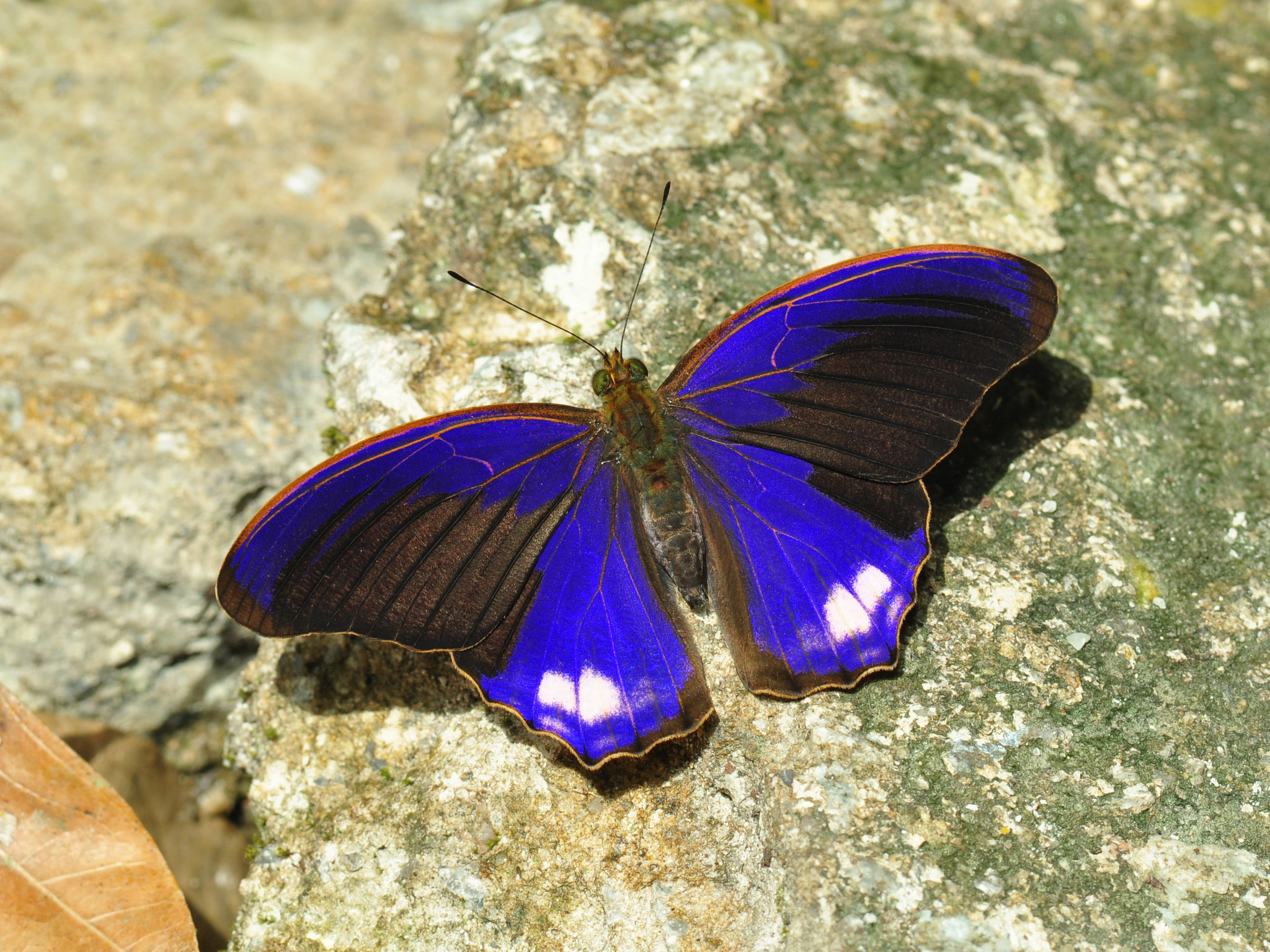
- Terinos terpander

Scientific classification
- Domain: Eukaryota
- Kingdom: Animalia
- Phylum: Arthropoda
- Class: Insecta
- Order: Lepidoptera
- Family: Nymphalidae
- Tribe: Vagrantini
- Genus: Terinos; Boisduval, [1836]

= Terinos =

Genus of brush-footed butterflies

Terinos is a genus of Nymphalid butterflies. They are found from Burma, through South-East Asia, to New Guinea.

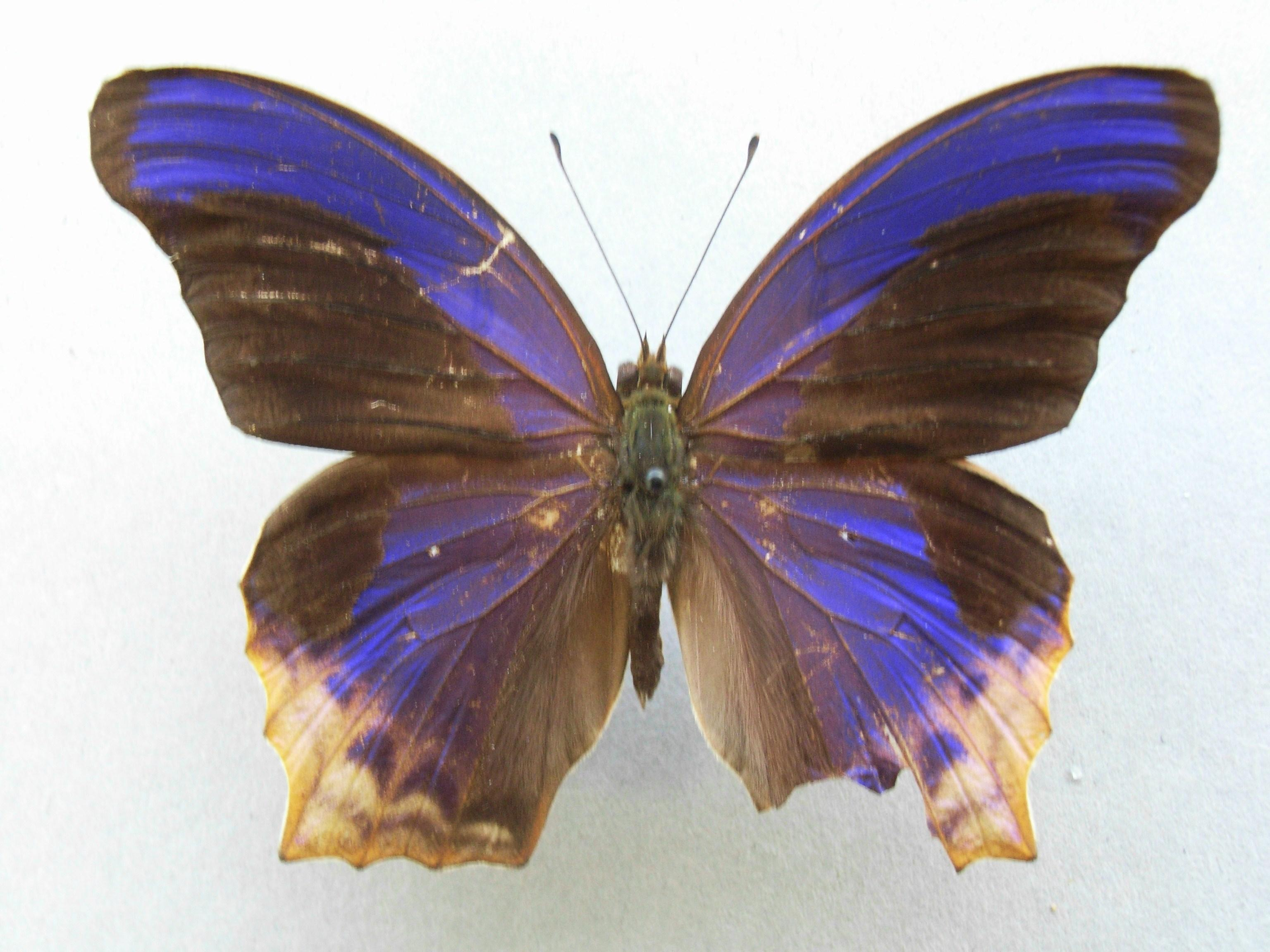
Terinos clarissa malayana

The few species belonging to this genus differ from those of the closely-allied Cynthia and Cirrochroa in being adorned with a most magnificent, blue-violet velvety lustre. Their chief characteristics consist in the ciliated eyes (which in the Argynnidae appear nearly always naked), in the manner in which the subcostal nervules branch off, in the direction of the lower discocellular which closes the cell in the hindwing and finally in the enormous sexual spots. In Terinos, the first subcostal is placed before the end of the cell, the second at the very end or a short distance beyond, the third and fourth stand close to one another and some little distance from the cell. In the male the lower discocellular joins the median vein at the origin of the second nervule, in the female between the first and second, The costa of the forewing is serrate. In the hindwing the cell is remarkably small and is closed by the lower discocellular which is very thin and in both sexes joins the median between the first and second branch. Moreover the males have a deep fold beyond the cell, as is found in Cynthia and Cirrochroa.The males of all the species have black scent-patches along the radials, the medians and the submedian veins on the forewings, as well as along the subcostal and radial veins on the hindwings; these scent-spots flowing together form one large glossy patch which in the eastern species extends as far as the upper median of the hindwing. The females of all species have in common that the lower discocellular joins the median vein invariably before the origin of the two upper median branches.

== Species ==
- Terinos alurgis Godman & Salvin, 1880
- Terinos atlita (Fabricius, 1787)
- Terinos clarissa Boisduval, 1836
- Terinos maddelena Grose-Smith & Kirby, 1889
- Terinos taxiles Hewitson, 1862
- Terinos terpander Hewitson, 1862
- Terinos tethys Hewitson, 1862
- Terinos romeo Schröder and Treadaway, 1984
