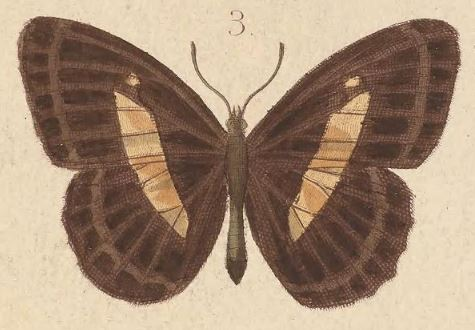
- Algia felderi

Scientific classification
- Domain: Eukaryota
- Kingdom: Animalia
- Phylum: Arthropoda
- Class: Insecta
- Order: Lepidoptera
- Family: Nymphalidae
- Tribe: Vagrantini
- Genus: Algia; Herrich-Schäffer, 1864

Synonyms
- Paduca Moore, 1886; Ducapa Moore, 1900

= Algia =

Genus of brush-footed butterflies

Algia is a genus of butterflies of the subfamily Heliconiinae in the family Nymphalidae found in southeast Asia. The genus ranges from Burma to New Guinea.

== Species ==
Listed in alphabetical order:

- Algia fasciata (C. & R. Felder, 1860)
- Algia felderi (Kirsch, 1877) (New Guinea)
- Algia satyrina (C. & R. Felder, [1867])
