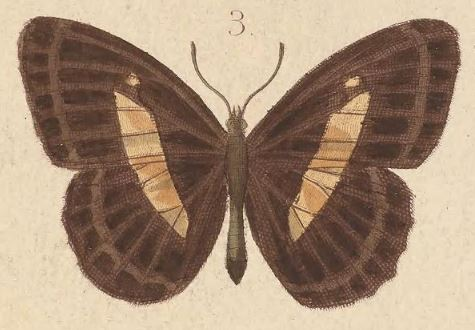

Scientific classification
- Domain: Eukaryota
- Kingdom: Animalia
- Phylum: Arthropoda
- Class: Insecta
- Order: Lepidoptera
- Family: Nymphalidae
- Genus: Algia
- Species: A. felderi

Binomial name
- Algia felderi (Kirsch, 1877)

Synonyms
- Cirrhochroa felderi Kirsch, 1877; Messaras mimicus Rothschild, 1904

= Algia felderi =

Species of butterfly

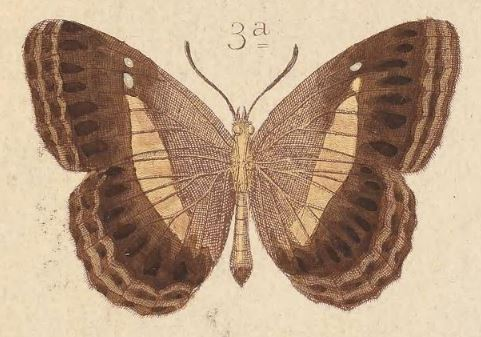
Algia felderi (underside)

Algia felderi is a butterfly of the family Nymphalidae. It is found on New Guinea.

== Subspecies ==
- Algia felderi felderi (Kirsch, 1877) (northern West Irian to New Guinea)
- Algia felderi mimicus (Rothschild, 1904) (Papua New Guinea)
