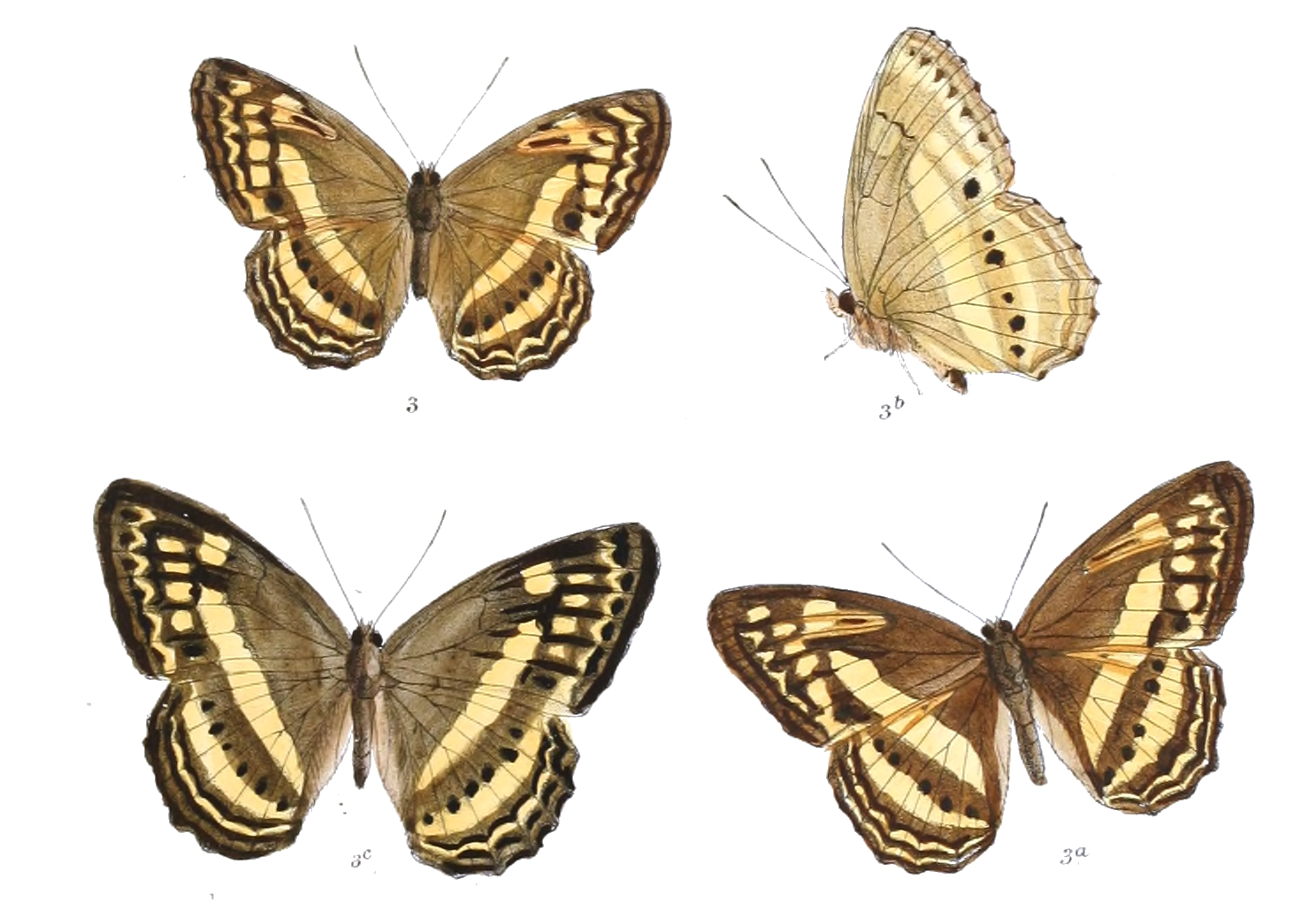

Scientific classification
- Domain: Eukaryota
- Kingdom: Animalia
- Phylum: Arthropoda
- Class: Insecta
- Order: Lepidoptera
- Family: Nymphalidae
- Genus: Algia
- Species: A. fasciata

Binomial name
- Algia fasciata (Felder & Felder, 1860)

Synonyms
- Atella fasciata C. & R. Felder, 1860; Ducapa palloris Fruhstorfer, 1900; Cirrochroa fasciata bilbilis Fruhstorfer, 1912; Cirrochroa fasciata ortopia Fruhstorfer, 1912

= Algia fasciata =

Species of insect

Algia fasciata is a species of brush-footed butterfly found in Asia.

== Subspecies ==
- Algia fasciata fasciata (southern Burma to Peninsular Malaya and Sumatra)
- Algia fasciata palloris (Fruhstorfer, 1900) (Palawan)
- Algia fasciata bilbilis (Fruhstorfer, 1912) (Java)
- Algia fasciata ortopia (Fruhstorfer, 1912) (the Philippines)
