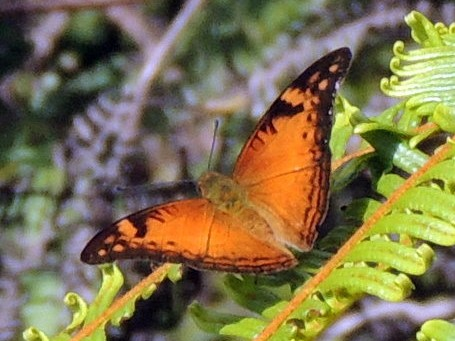

Scientific classification
- Kingdom: Animalia
- Phylum: Arthropoda
- Clade: Pancrustacea
- Class: Insecta
- Order: Lepidoptera
- Family: Nymphalidae
- Tribe: Vagrantini
- Genus: Smerina; Hewitson, 1874
- Species: S. manoro

Binomial name
- Smerina manoro (Ward, 1871)

Synonyms
- Atella manoro Ward, 1871; Smerina vindonissa Hewitson, 1874

= Smerina =

Smerina manoro

Monotypic brush-footed butterfly genus

Smerina is a genus of butterflies of the subfamily Heliconiinae in the family Nymphalidae. It contains only one species, Smerina manoro, which is found on Madagascar, where it is restricted to the forests on the eastern seaboard.
