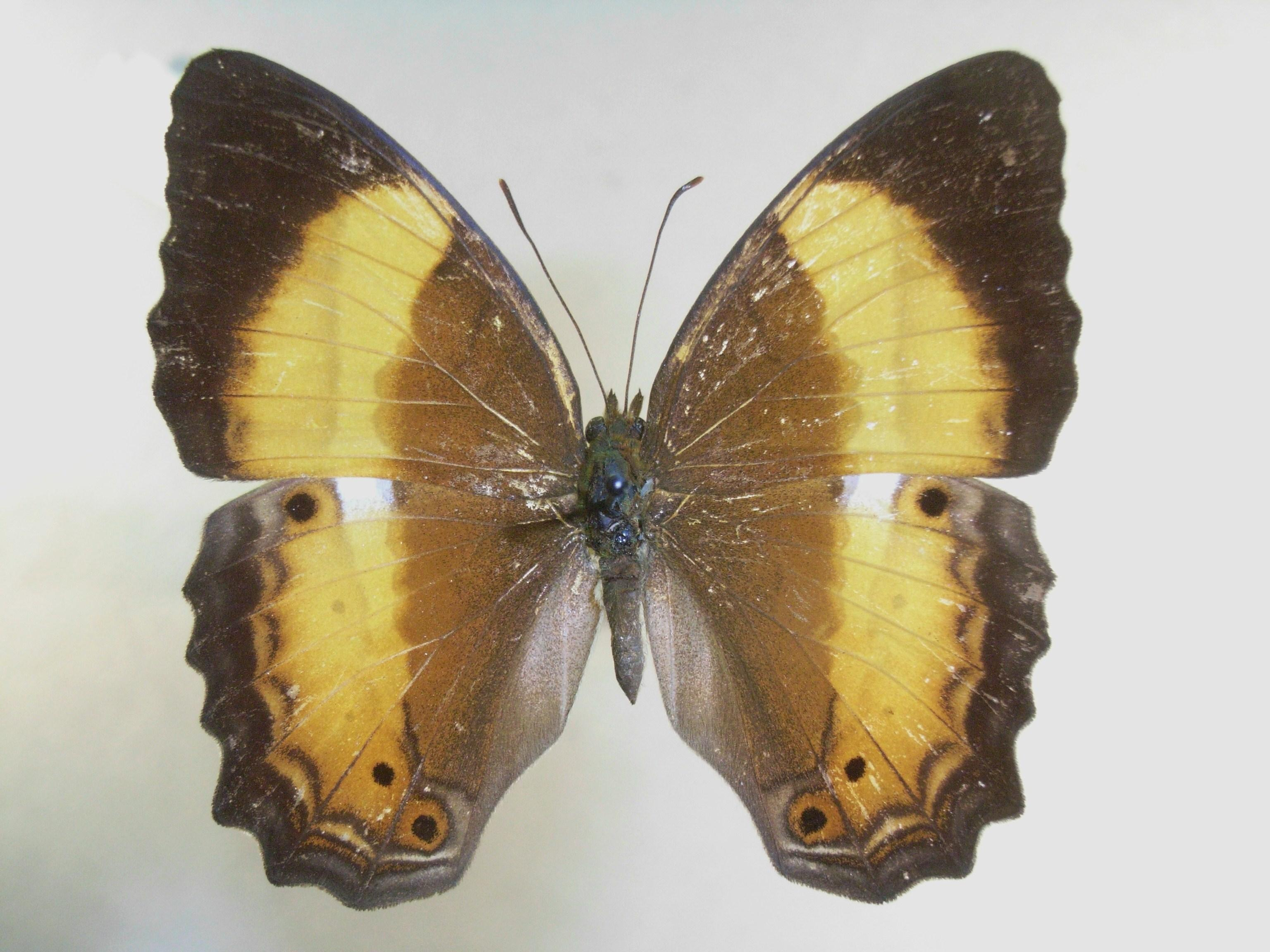

Scientific classification
- Kingdom: Animalia
- Phylum: Arthropoda
- Class: Insecta
- Order: Lepidoptera
- Family: Nymphalidae
- Genus: Cirrochroa
- Species: C. satellita

Binomial name
- Cirrochroa satellita Butler, 1869

= Cirrochroa satellita =

Species of insect

Cirrochroa satellita is an Indomalayan species of heliconiine butterfly.

Under surface a lovely bright yellow growing darker towards the margin. Both wings are traversed by a broad white band which is bordered on either side with red, turning straw-coloured toward the costa in the forewings. The hindwings contain also a row of black spots, as is usual in Cirrochroa, but less complete.

== Subspecies ==
- C. s. satellita (Peninsular Malaya, Sumatra, Philippines)
- C. s. illergata Fruhstorfer, 1912 (Borneo, Palawan)
