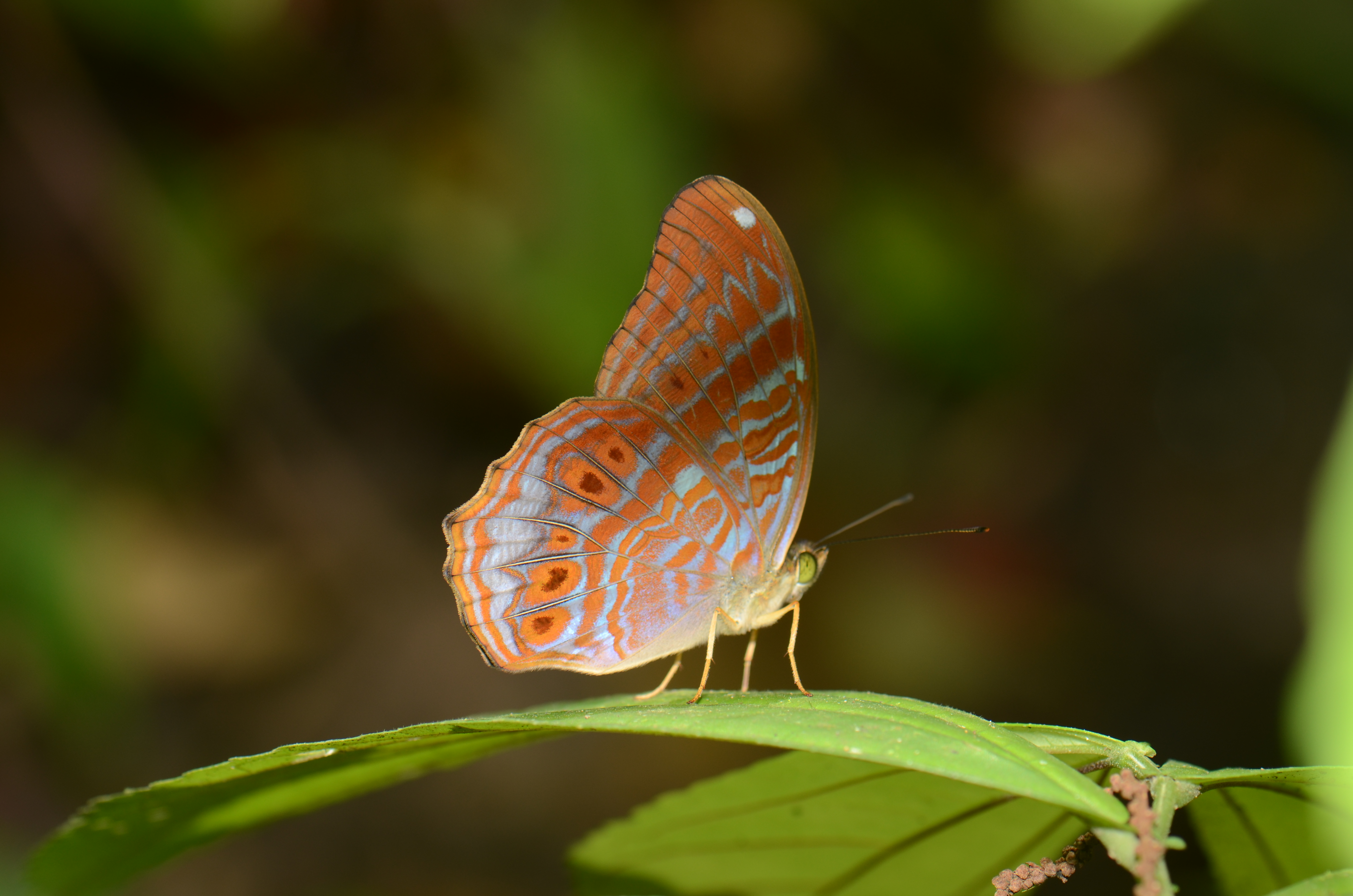

Scientific classification
- Kingdom: Animalia
- Phylum: Arthropoda
- Class: Insecta
- Order: Lepidoptera
- Family: Nymphalidae
- Genus: Terinos
- Species: T. terpander

Binomial name
- Terinos terpander (Hewitson, 1862)

Synonyms
- Terinos robertsia Butler, 1867; Terinos teos de Nicéville, 1893; Terinos robertsia niasica Fruhstorfer, 1901; Terinos piepersi Martin, 1909

= Terinos terpander =

Species of butterfly

Terinos terpander, the royal Assyrian, is a butterfly in the family Nymphalidae. It was described by William Chapman Hewitson in 1862. It is found in the Indomalayan realm.

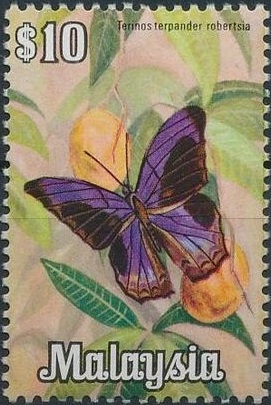
T. t. robertsia depicted on a postage stamp

It is the smallest species of the genus; at the same time it displays on the forewings the least-developed scent-patches; they not only begin beyond the cell, but do not flow together anteriorly, being represented along the upper radial by an isolated streak of thinly scattered scales. The hindwings are either orange-coloured in the distal half, or spotted with white in the anal area or they may be uniform blue, according to the locality. The under surface is red-brown, differing from all the other known species in being adorned with very broad longitudinal fasciae of a vivid metallic gray lustre, which in some forms are accompanied on the hindwings by pure white submarginal bands.

== Subspecies ==
- T. t. terpander (Borneo, Malaysia)
- T. t. robertsia (Butler, 1867) (Burma - Singapore)
- T. t. blachieri Fruhstorfer, 1914 (Indochina)
- T. t. intermedia Godfrey, 1916 (Vietnam)
- T. t. tiomanensis Eliot, 1978 (Pulau Tioman, Pulau Aur)
- T. t. teos de Nicéville, 1893 (Sumatra)
- T. t. niasica Fruhstorfer, 1901 (Nias)
- T. t. natunensis Fruhstorfer, 1901 (Natuna Island)
- T. t. bangkanensis Fruhstorfer, 1912 (Bangka Island)
- T. t. piepersi Martin, 1909 (Java)

== Biology ==
The larva on feeds on Rinorea anguifera.
