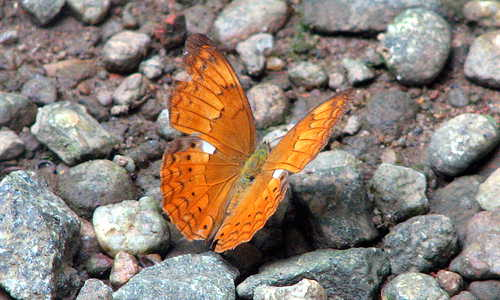
- Tamil yeoman (C. thais)
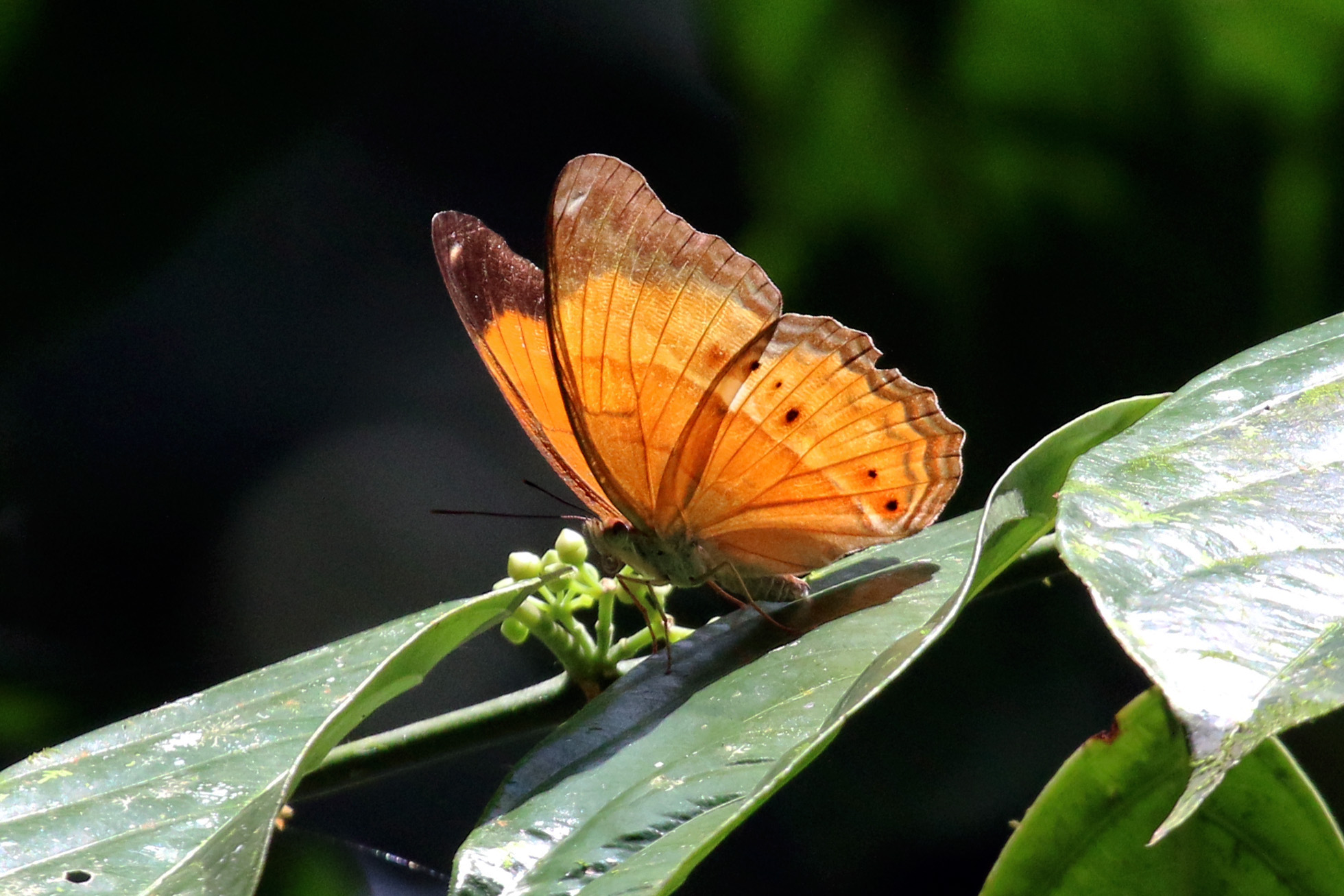
- Malay yeoman (C. emalea emalea)

Scientific classification
- Kingdom: Animalia
- Phylum: Arthropoda
- Class: Insecta
- Order: Lepidoptera
- Family: Nymphalidae
- Tribe: Vagrantini
- Genus: Cirrochroa; Doubleday, 1847

Species
- c. 18, see text

= Cirrochroa =

Genus of brush-footed butterflies

Cirrochroa, commonly called yeomen, is a genus of butterflies of the subfamily Heliconiinae in the family Nymphalidae found in southeast Asia. The genus ranges from India to New Guinea.

== Description ==
Fairly large, broad-winged butterflies. The outer edges of the wings are wavy. The ground colour of the upper side is usually brown-orange, but can also be brown or blue. The wingtips are usually darker, and often have one or more thin brown zigzag lines along the outer edge and a series of brown spots on the hindwing. The underside of the wings is usually light brownish at the root, darker in the outer half.Cirrochroa is very nearly allied to Cynthia; but one can immediately recognize them through the delicate antennae, which are only slightly thickened at the end, and which bear no distinctly defined club. Further distinguishing characters are to be found in the strongly swollen palpi, the last joint of which is very finely pointed, the naked eyes and the simple precostal vein, which branches from behind the base of the subcostal, and which is slightly bent outwards. The neuration of Cirrochroa does not differ essentially from that of Cynthia and on this account is sharply divided from Cupha, the only other Argynnis-Genus, which possesses clubless antennae.

== Biology ==
These butterflies prefer to live in forest edges up to 1000 meters above sea level. At least one of the species has larvae that live on the plant genus Hydnocarpus ( Achariaceae ). The butterflies are fast fliers, and relatively shy. They like to come down to the ground to soak up moisture.

== Species ==
In alphabetical order:

- Cirrochroa aoris Doubleday, 1847 – large yeoman
- Cirrochroa chione Riley & Godfrey, 1921
- Cirrochroa clagia (Godart, 1824)
- Cirrochroa emalea (Guérin-Méneville, 1843) – Malay yeoman
- Cirrochroa eremita Tsukada, 1985
- Cirrochroa imperatrix Grose-Smith, 1894
- Cirrochroa malaya C. & R. Felder, 1860
- Cirrochroa menones Semper, 1888
- Cirrochroa niassica Honrath, 1892
- Cirrochroa nicobarica Wood-Mason, 1881
- Cirrochroa orissa C. & R. Felder, 1860 – banded yeoman
- Cirrochroa recondita Roos, 1996
- Cirrochroa regina C. & R. Felder, 1867
- Cirrochroa satellita Butler, 1869
- Cirrochroa semiramis C. & R. Felder, 1867
- Cirrochroa surya Moore, 1879 – little yeoman
- Cirrochroa thais (Fabricius, 1787) – Tamil yeoman
- Cirrochroa tyche C. & R. Felder, 1861 – common yeoman
- Cirrochroa thule C. & R. Felder, 1860
