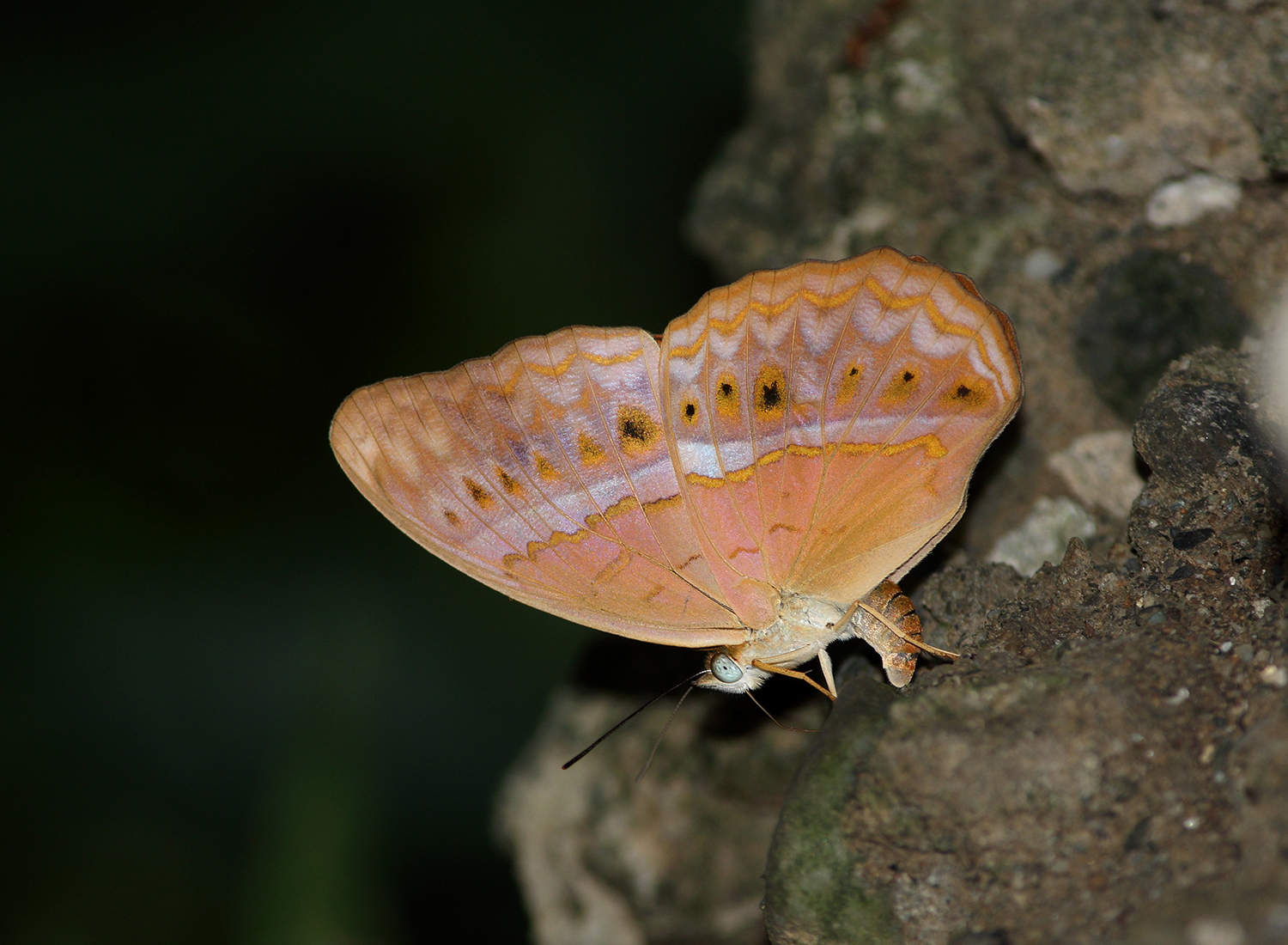

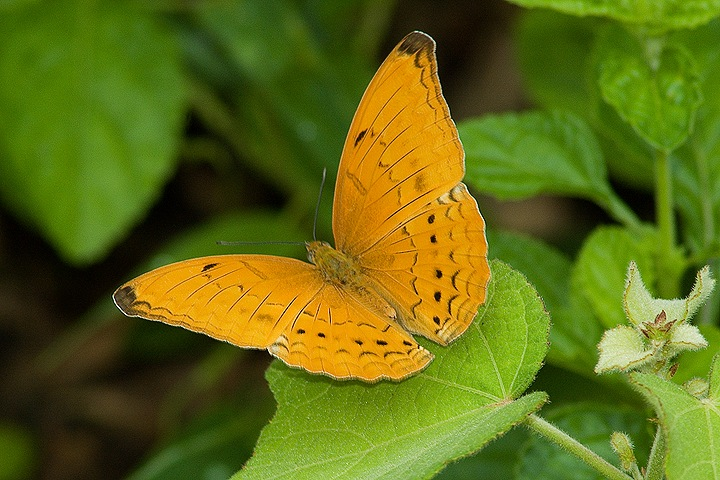

Scientific classification
- Kingdom: Animalia
- Phylum: Arthropoda
- Class: Insecta
- Order: Lepidoptera
- Family: Nymphalidae
- Genus: Cirrochroa
- Species: C. tyche

Binomial name
- Cirrochroa tyche Felder & Felder, 1861

Synonyms
- Cirrochroa mithila Moore, 1872; Cirrochroa zebuna Fruhstorfer, 1912; Cirrochroa guimarensis Fruhstorfer, 1912; Cirrochroa rotundata Butler, 1879; Cirrochroa moeris Fruhstorfer, 1912; Cirrochroa tanaquil Fruhstorfer, 1912; Cirrochroa anjira Moore, 1877

= Cirrochroa tyche =

Common yeoman

Species of butterfly

Cirrochroa tyche, the common yeoman, is a species of nymphalid butterfly found in forested areas of tropical South Asia and Southeast Asia.

The wings of the common yeoman are tawny orange with black distal margin and sinuate marginal and submarginal lines on the upperside. There are black post-discal spots on the hindwing.The female is duller orange with black margin at the forewing apex broader than that in the male. On the underside, the wings are paler orange in the male and dull brownish orange in the female. Both wings have a silvery white transverse discal band verso.

== Subspecies ==
- C. t. tyche (central and southern Philippines)
- C. t. anjira Moore, 1877 (Andamans)
- C. t. aurica Eliot, 1978 (Pulau Aur, Pulau Tioman, Pulau Permanggil)
- C. t. laudabilis Fruhstorfer, 1900 (Palawan, Dumaran)
- C. t. lesseta Fruhstorfer, 1912 (southern China, Hainan and possibly Hong Kong)
- C. t. mithila Moore, 1872 (Sikkim and Assam to Indochina and southern Yunnan)
- C. t. rotundata Butler, 1879 (southern Burma and possibly Java and Sumatra)
- C. t. thilina Fruhstorfer, 1905 (Borneo)
