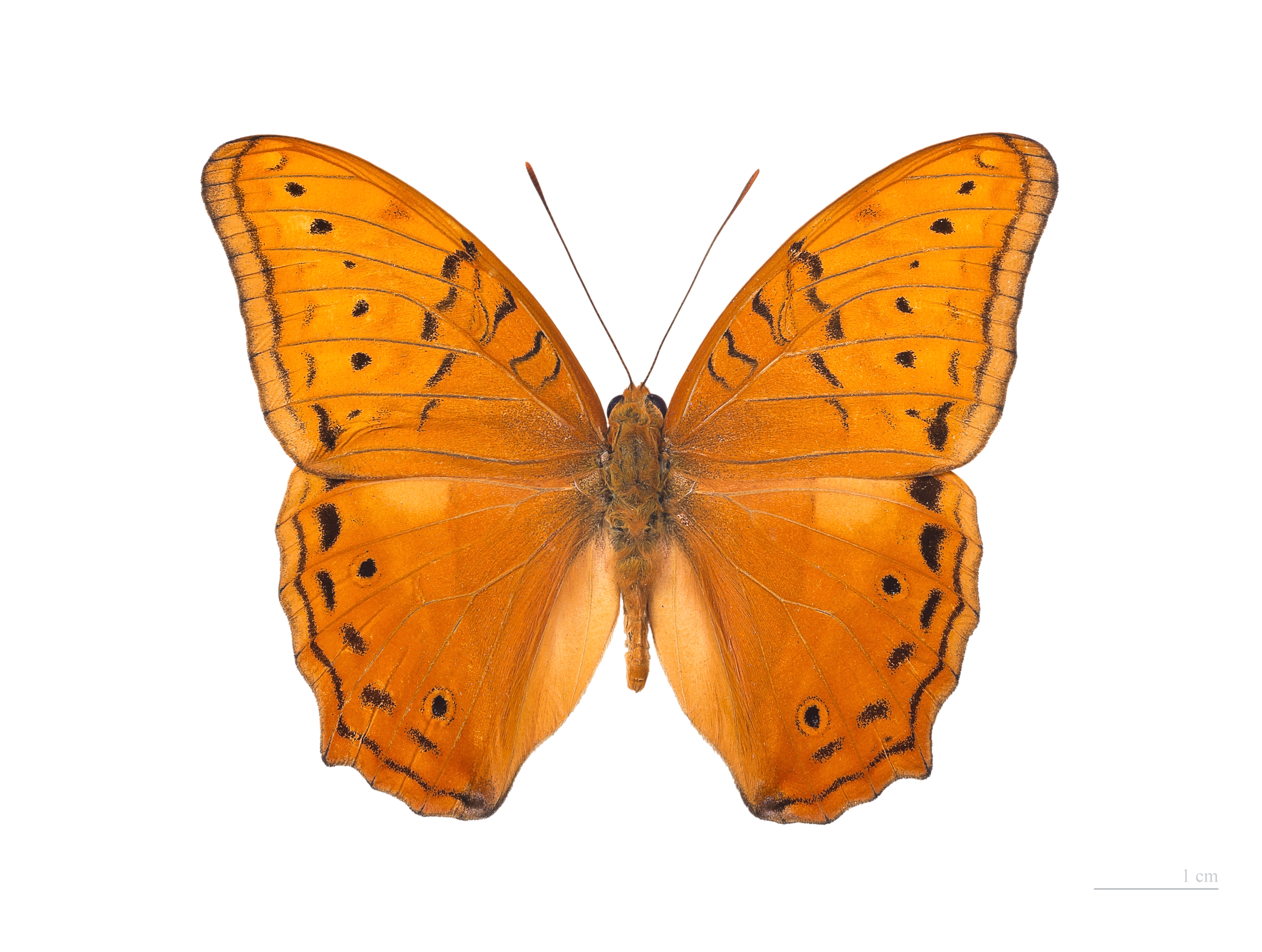
- Cruiser (Vindula arsinoe)

Scientific classification
- Domain: Eukaryota
- Kingdom: Animalia
- Phylum: Arthropoda
- Class: Insecta
- Order: Lepidoptera
- Family: Nymphalidae
- Subfamily: Heliconiinae
- Tribe: Vagrantini; Duponchel, 1835

Genera
- 10, see text

= Vagrantini =

Tribe of butterflies

Vagrantini is a tribe of butterflies in the subfamily Heliconiinae found from east Africa over the Indian subcontinent to eastern Asia and Australia.

== Genera ==
Listed in alphabetical order:

- Algia Herrich-Schäffer, 1864
- Algiachroa Parsons, 1989
- Cirrochroa Doubleday, 1847 – yeomen
- Cupha Billberg, 1820
- Lachnoptera Doubleday, 1847
- Phalanta Horsfield, 1829 – leopards
- Smerina Hewitson, 1874
- Terinos Boisduval, 1836
- Vagrans Hemming, 1934
- Vindula Hemming, 1934
