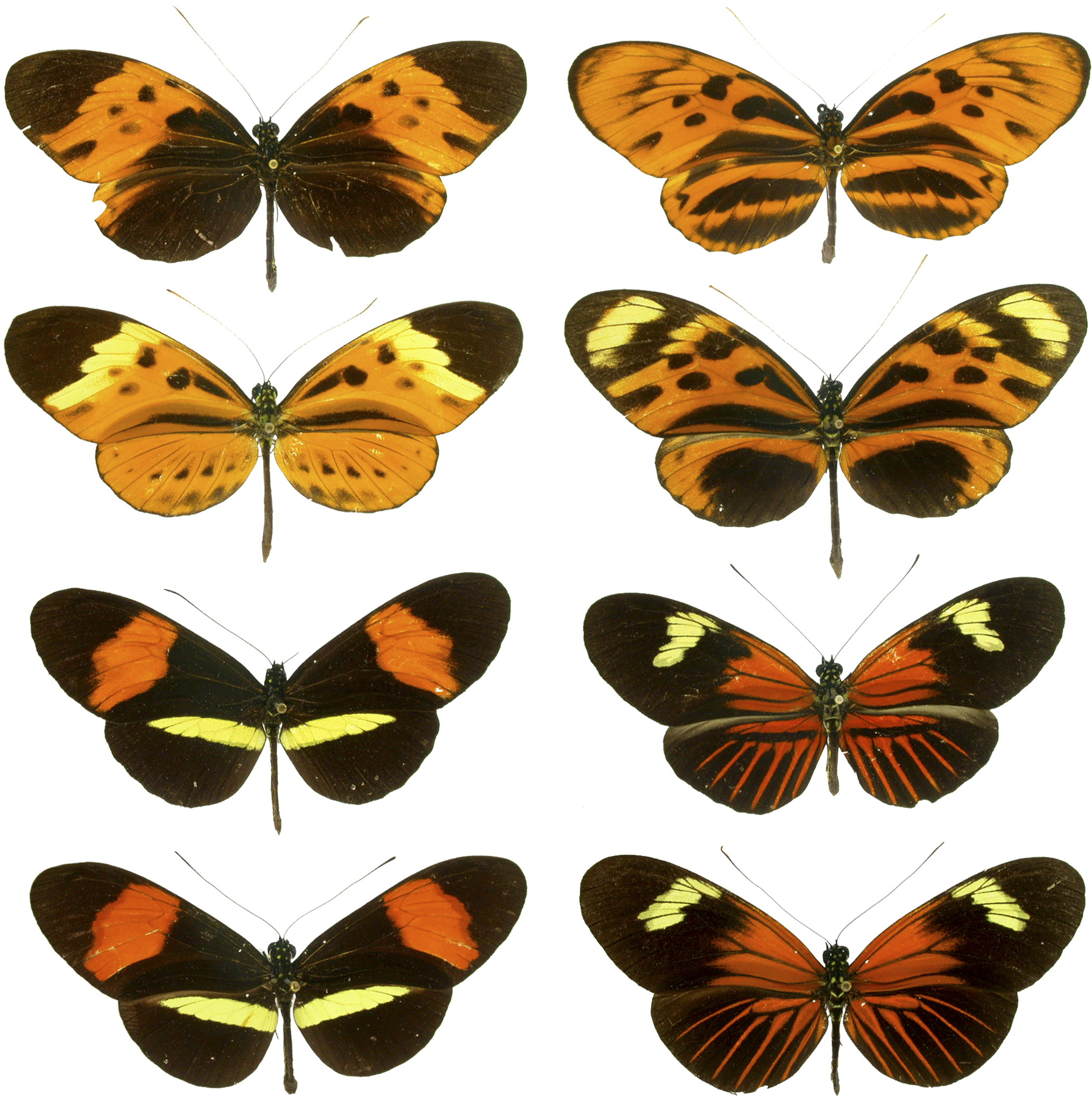
- Mimicry in Heliconius

Scientific classification
- Kingdom: Animalia
- Phylum: Arthropoda
- Clade: Pancrustacea
- Class: Insecta
- Order: Lepidoptera
- Family: Nymphalidae
- Subfamily: Heliconiinae; Swainson, 1822

Tribes
- Acraeini; Heliconiini; Argynnini; Vagrantini; and see text

Synonyms
- Heliconiidae Swainson, 1822

= Heliconiinae =

Subfamily of butterfly family Nymphalidae

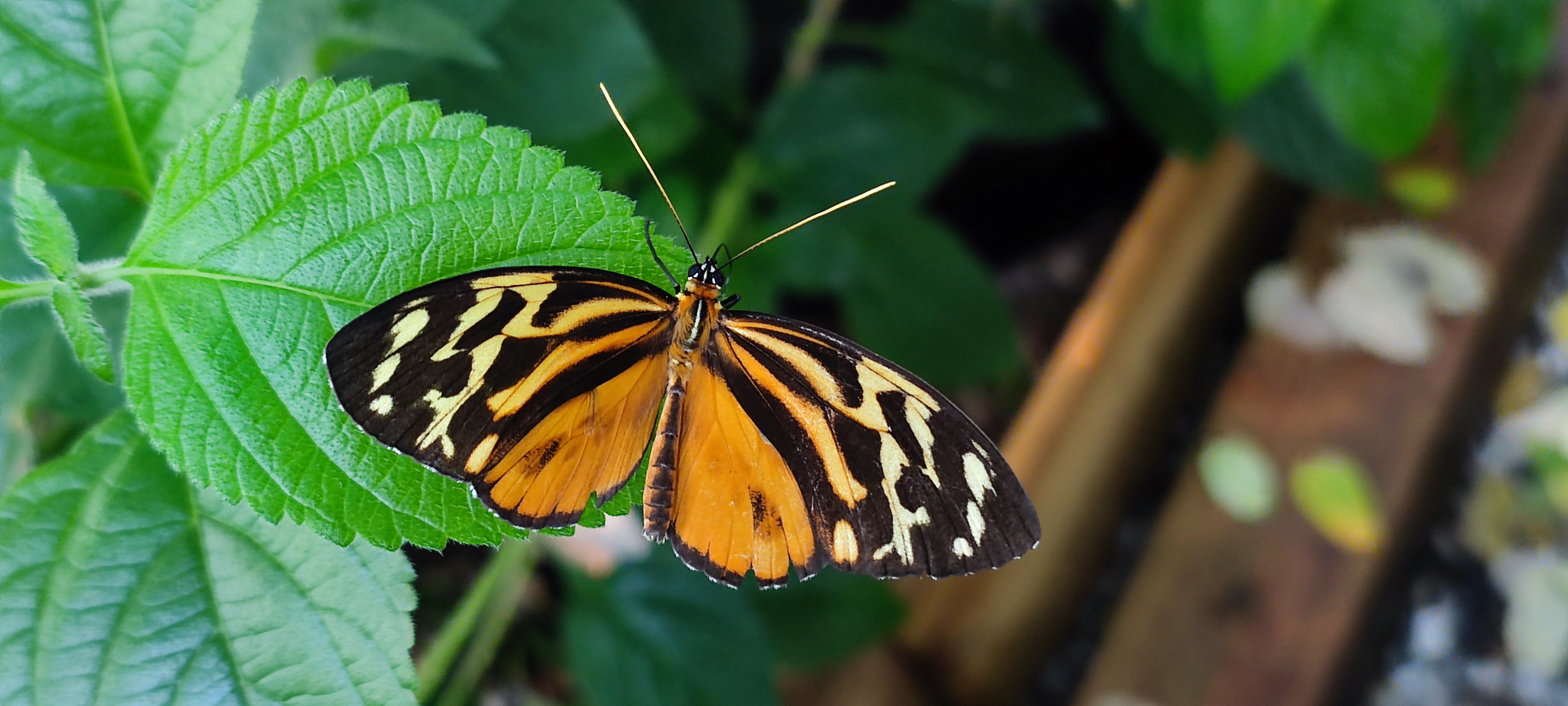
Orange-and-black longwing butterfly on leaf

The Heliconiinae, commonly called heliconians or longwings, are a subfamily of the brush-footed butterflies (family Nymphalidae). They can be divided into 45–50 genera and were sometimes treated as a separate family Heliconiidae within the Papilionoidea. The colouration is predominantly reddish and black, and though of varying wing shape, the forewings are always elongated tipwards, hence the common name.

Most longwings are found in the Tropics, particularly in South America; only the Argynnini are quite diverse in the Holarctic. Especially tropical species feed on poisonous plants, characteristically Passifloraceae vines, as larvae, becoming poisonous themselves. The adult butterflies announce their acquired toxicity with strong aposematic colours, warning off would-be predators. There are several famous cases of Batesian and Müllerian mimicry both within this group and with other butterflies. Other commonly seen food plants are Fabaceae (which also contain several toxic species), and particularly among northerly species of Violaceae.

== Systematics ==
Four or five tribes are generally recognized in the Heliconiinae. There have been numerous attempts to sort out the phylogenetic sequence and delimitation of these, but while the former has made good progress, the latter has hitherto only achieved limited results.

Several phylogenies (and corresponding taxonomic adjustments) have been proposed, but though looking reasonable each and every one of them is only weakly supported. Even cladistic analyses of the same type of data often yield contradicting results depending on the exact method of evaluation. Ultimately, the reason is that just a fraction of the evolutionary diversity of Heliconiinae has been sampled.

What appears fairly certain is that the Argynnini and Vagrantini are closer relatives than any other two tribes of Heliconiinae. The Acraeini and Heliconiini are probably more basal lineages, but the exact placement of each respective to the other tribes cannot be considered well resolved at all.

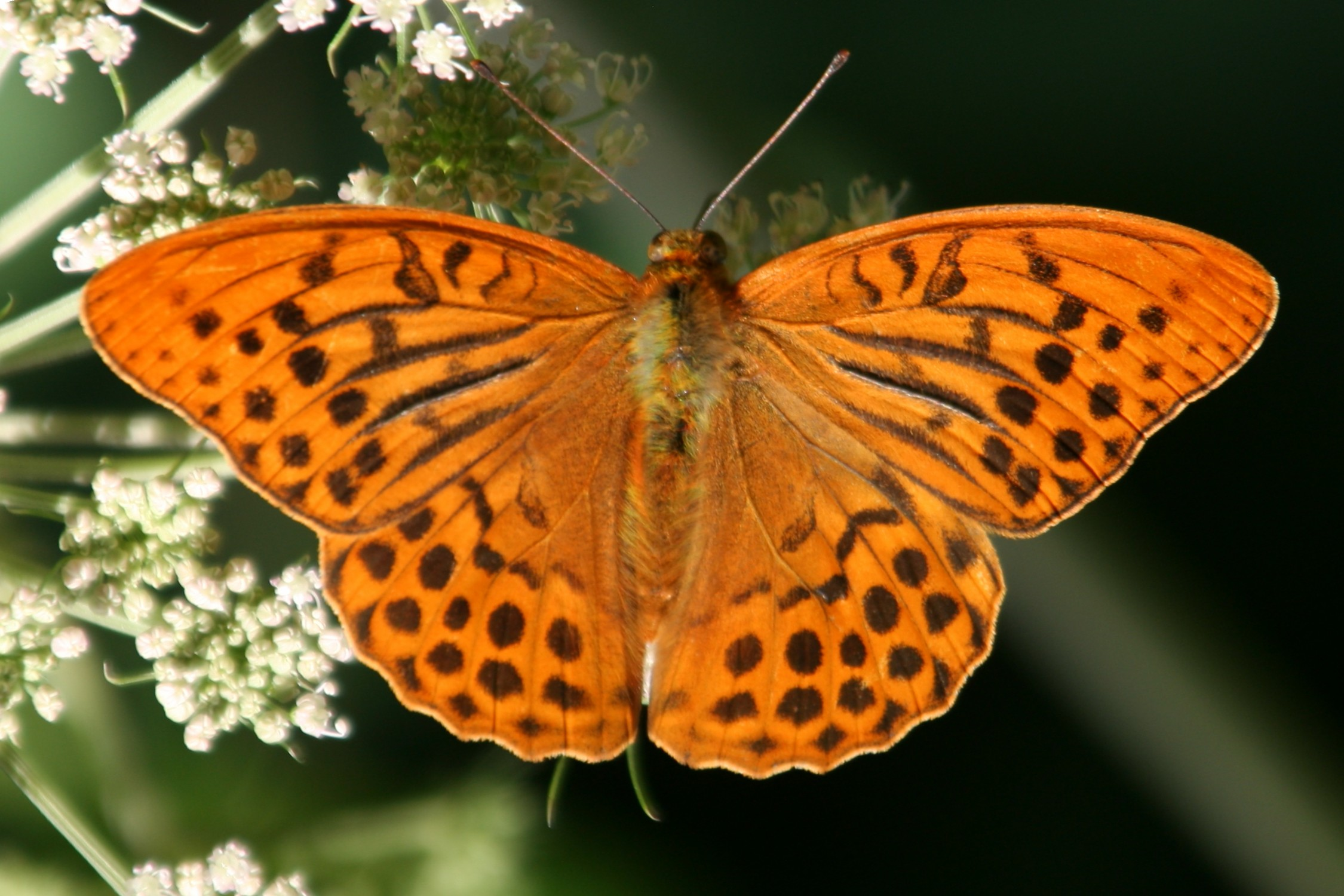
Male of the silver-washed fritillary (Argynnis paphia), type species of Argynnis and the Argynnini

Some tribes are distributed among several continents, resulting in a confusing phylogeography pattern. But as it seems, the apparent contradictions between systematics and biogeography are due to the premature classifications based on insufficient taxon sampling. With studies becoming more and more comprehensive, the apparent anomalies seem to sort themselves out at least for the most part. For example, the confusing distribution pattern of Acraea in the wide circumscription is apparently simply due to the bulk of this morphologically conservative group warranting recognition as genus Telchinia – it stands to note that this group has on occasion been allied with Actinote rather than Acraea, and this indeed appears to be correct.

In addition, the genus Pardopsis, often placed in the Acraeini, does almost certainly not belong there; it is now tentatively placed in the Argynnini. The relationships of the genus Cethosia (sometimes treated as a tribe of its own) are even more mysterious, and it is likely that some other genera will eventually also be moved to a different tribe as they are studied in detail. Some, like the Argynnini Argynnis, Boloria and Issoria, might be overlumped and non-monophyletic and thus some genera presently usually considered junior synonyms of them might eventually be validated like Telchinia.

=== Genera ===
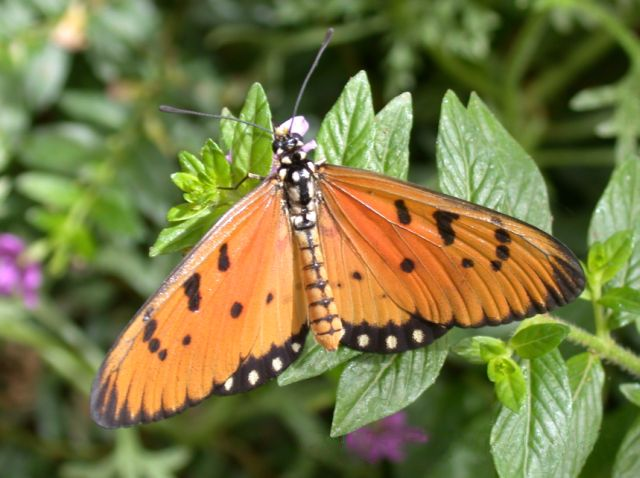
Well-known tawny coaster of the Acraeini presently goes by the scientific name Acraea terpsicore.

Genera are presented in the presumed phylogenetic sequence. Notable species are also given if no genus article exists.

Acraeini Boisduval, 1833

- Abananote Potts, 1943
- Actinote Hübner, 1819
- Altinote Potts, 1943
- Acraea Fabricius, 1807 (paraphyletic)
- Bematistes Hemming, 1935
- Cethosia Fabricius, 1807 – lacewings
- Miyana Fruhstorfer, 1914 (tentatively placed here)

Heliconiini Swainson, 1822

- Agraulis Boisduval & Le Conte, 1835

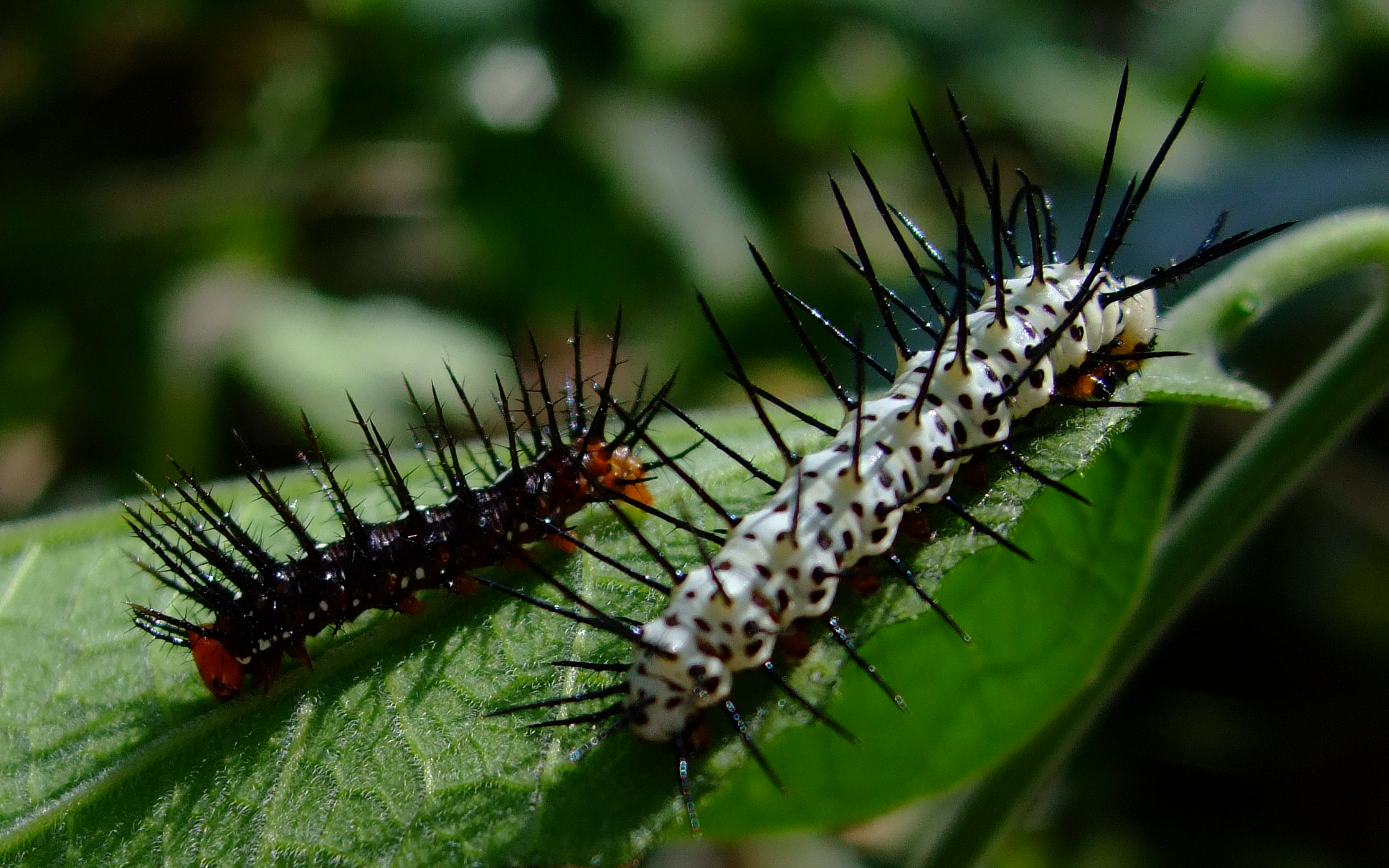
Heliconiini caterpillars: Julia heliconian (Dryas iulia) (left) and zebra longwing (Heliconius charithonia)

- Dione Hübner, 1819
- Dryadula Michner, 1942 – banded orange
- Dryas Hübner, [1807] – Julia heliconian
- Eueides Hübner, 1816
- Heliconius Kluk, 1780 – brush-foot butterflies
- Philaethria Billberg, 1820
- Podotricha Michener, 1942

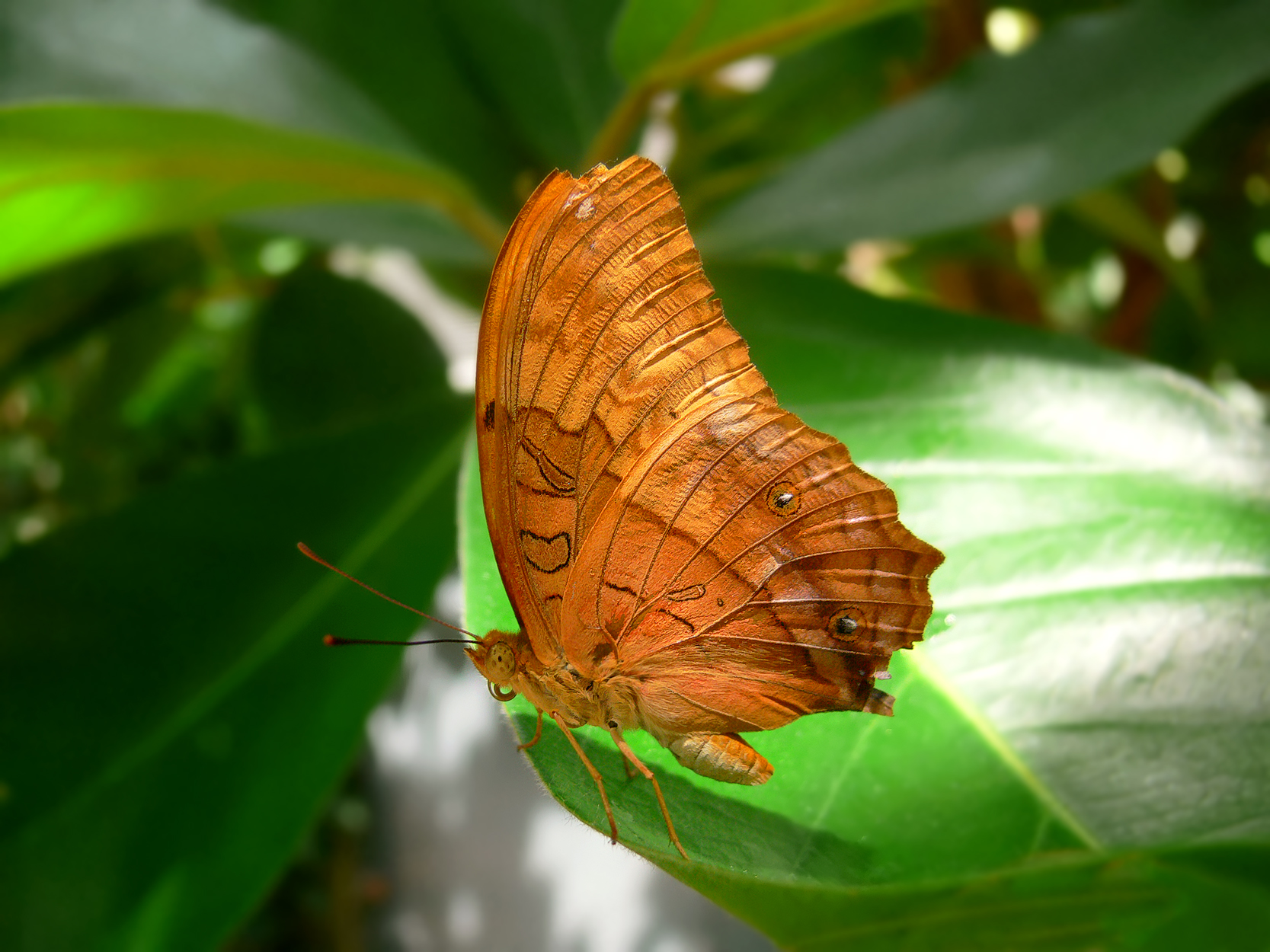
Cruiser butterfly Vindula arsinoe of the Vagrantini

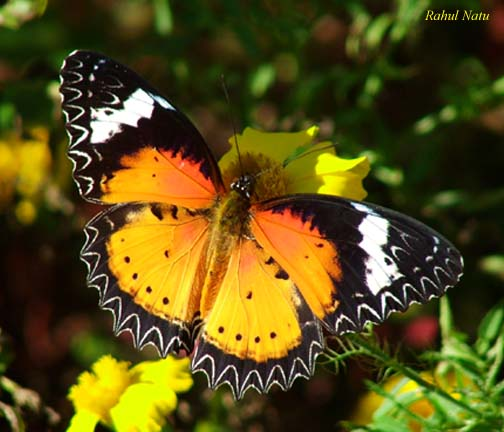
Leopard lacewing (Cethosia cyane) belongs to the puzzling genus Cethosia

Vagrantini Pinratana & Eliot, 1996

- Lachnoptera Doubleday, 1847
- Phalanta Horsfield, 1829
- Smerina Hewitson, 1874
- Vindula Hemming, 1934 – cruisers
- Cirrochroa Doubleday, 1847
- Algiachroa Parsons, 1989
- Algia Herrich-Schäffer, 1864
- Terinos Boisduval, 1836
- Cupha Billberg, 1820
- Vagrans Hemming, 1934

Argynnini Duponchel, 1835

- Euptoieta Doubleday 1848
- Pardopsis Trimen, 1887 (tentatively placed here)
- Yramea Reuss 1920
- Boloria Moore, 1900 (including Clossiana)
- Issoria Hübner 1819
- Brenthis Hübner 1819
- Argynnis Fabricius 1807
- Speyeria Scudder, 1872
- Fabriciana Reuss, 1920
