= List of flora on stamps of Australia =

Australia's flora has been depicted on numerous Australian stamp issues:

- Acacia baileyana – 1978
- Acacia coriacea – 2002
- Acacia dealbata (?) – 1982
- Acacia melanoxylon – 1996
- Acacia pycnantha – 1959, 1979, 1990
- Acmena smithii – 2002
- Actinodium cunninghamii – 2005
- Actinotus helianthi – 1959
- Adansonia gregorii – 2005
- Anigozanthos 'Bush Tango' – 2003
- Anigozanthos manglesii – 1962, 1968, 2006
- Armillaria luteobubalina fungus – 1981
- Banksia integrifolia – 2000
- Banksia prionotes (?) – 1996
- Banksia serrata – 1960, 1986
- Barringtonia calyptrata – 2001
- Blandfordia grandiflora – 1960, 1967
- Blandfordia punicea – 2007
- Brachychiton acerifolius – 1978
- Callistemon glaucus – 2000
- Callistemon teretifolius – 1975
- Caleana major – 1986
- Caltha introloba – 1986
- Calytrix carinata – 2002
- Celmisia asteliifolia – 1986
- Cochlospermum gillivraei – 2001
- Coprinus comatus fungus – 1981
- Correa reflexa – 1986, 1999
- Cortinarius austrovenetus fungus – 1981
- Cortinarius cinnabarinus fungus – 1981
- Dendrobium nindii – 1986, 2003
- Dendrobium phalaenopsis – 1968, 1998
- Dicksonia antarctica – 1996
- Dillenia alata – 1986
- Diuris magnifica – 2006
- Elythranthera emarginata – 1986
- Epacris impressa – 1968
- Eucalyptus caesia – 1982
- Eucalyptus calophylla 'Rosea' – 1982
- Eucalyptus camaldulensis – 1974
- Eucalyptus diversicolor – 2005
- Eucalyptus ficifolia – 1982
- Eucalyptus forrestiana – 1982
- Eucalyptus globulus – 1968, 1982
- Eucalyptus grossa – 2005
- Eucalyptus pauciflora – 2005
- Euschemon rafflesia – 1983
- Eucalyptus papuana – 1978, 1993, 2002
- Eucalyptus regnans – 1996
- Eucalyptus sp. – 1985
- Ficus macrophylla – 2005
- Gossypium sturtianum – 1971, 1978, 2007
- Grevillea juncifolia – 2002
- Grevillea mucronulata – 2007
- Grevillea 'Superb' – 2003
- Hakea laurina – 2006
- Hardenbergia violacea – 2000
- Helichrysum thomsonii – 1975
- Helipterum albicans – 1986
- Hibbertia scandens – 1999
- Hibiscus meraukensis – 1986
- Ipomoea pes-caprae ssp. brasiliensis – 1999
- Leucochrysum albicans – 1986
- Microseros lanceolata – 2002
- Nelumbo nucifera – 2002
- Nymphaea immutabilis – 2002
- Phalaenopsis rosenstromii – 1998
- Phebalium whitei – 2007
- Swainsona formosa – 1968, 1971, 2005
- Santalum acuminatum – 2002
- Telopea speciosissima – 1959, 1968, 2006
- Thelymitra variegata – 1986
- Thysanothus tuberosus – 2005
- Wahlenbergia gloriosa – 1986
- Wahlenbergia stricta – 1999
- Wollemia nobilis – 2005
- Xanthorrhoea australis – 1978

== See also ==
- List of people on stamps of Australia
- List of butterflies on stamps of Australia
