= List of butterflies on stamps of Australia =

This is a list of butterflies on Australian postage stamps. Australia Post has issued several stamp series featuring Australian butterflies: 1981 (10 stamps); 1991 and 1997 (1 stamp only in each series); 1998 (5 stamps); 2003 (2 stamps, plus a moth caterpillar stamp); and 2004 (4 stamps, but 2 species on $2 stamp). The Ulysses Swallowtail, Papilio ulysses, has been featured four times: 1981, 1998, 2003 and 2004. Cethosia cydippe has featured three times: once in 1998, and on two different stamps in 2004. The Clearwing Swallowtail, Cressida cressida, has been featured twice: 1981 and 1997.

- Euschemon rafflesia (1981,4c)
- Troides euphorion (1981, 10c)
- Graphium macleayanus (1981, 20c)
- Papilio ulysses (1981, 27c)
- Pseudalmenus chlorinda (1981, 30c)
- Tirumala hamata (1981, 35c)
- Cressida cressida (1981, 45c)
- Delias aganippe (1981, 60c)
- Ogyris amaryllis (1981, 80c)
- Tisiphone abeona (1981, $1)
- Cizara ardeniae (1991, 43c)
- Cressida cressida (1997, $1)
- Cethosia cydippe (1998, 45c)
- Arhopala centaurus (1998, 45c)
- Junonia villida (1998, 45c)
- Papilio ulysses (1998, 45c)
- Chaetocneme beata (1998, 45c)
- Papilio ulysses (2003, 50c)
- Graphium agamemnon (2003, 50c)
- Cethosia cydippe (2004, 5c)
- Hypolimnas alimena (2004, 10c)
- Vindula arsinoe (2004, 75c)
- Papilio ulysses (2004, $2)
- Cethosia cydippe (2004, $2)
- Cupha prosope (2016, $1)
- Ornithoptera euphorion (2016, $1)
- Graphium eurypylus (2016, $1)
- Papilio demoleus (2016, $2.75)
- Paralucia spinifera (2020, $1.10)
- Papilio amynthor amphiaraus (2021, $1.10)
- Cepora perimale perimale (2021, $2.20)

== See also ==
- List of flora on stamps of Australia
