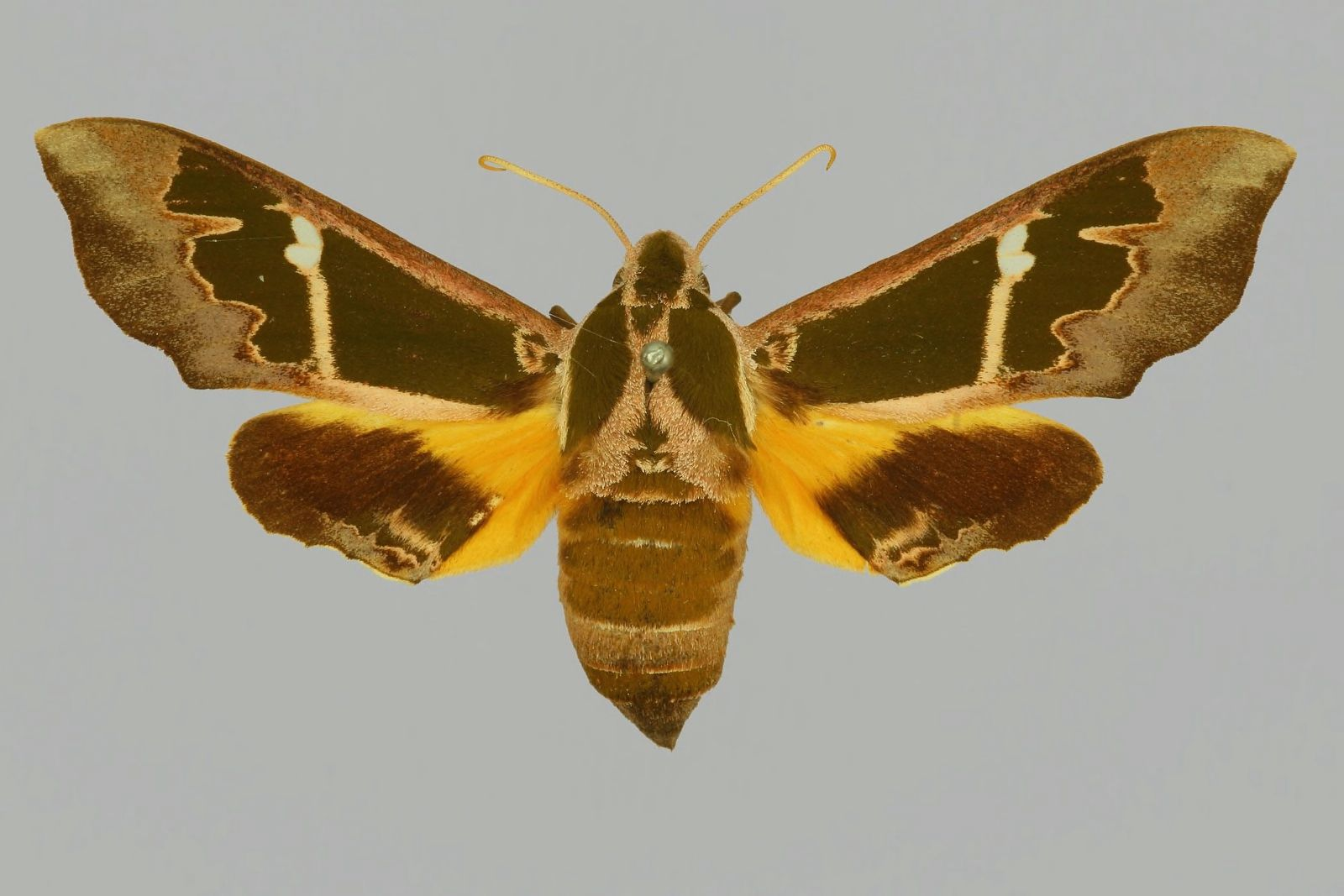
- Female

Scientific classification
- Domain: Eukaryota
- Kingdom: Animalia
- Phylum: Arthropoda
- Class: Insecta
- Order: Lepidoptera
- Family: Sphingidae
- Genus: Cizara
- Species: C. sculpta

Binomial name
- Cizara sculpta (R. Felder, 1874)

Synonyms
- Microlophia sculpta R. Felder, 1874; Cizara schausi Clark, 1923

= Cizara sculpta =

Species of moth

Cizara sculpta is a moth of the family Sphingidae first described by Rudolf Felder in 1874. It is known from southern and eastern India, Myanmar, south-western China, Thailand and Vietnam.

The wingspan is 50–70 mm. It is similar to Cizara ardeniae but distinguishable by the yellow base and inner margin of the hindwing upperside. The Forewing upperside is also similar to Cizara ardeniae, but the distal edge to the central paler green area is irregular. The hindwing upperside is basally yellow.

The larvae have been recorded feeding on Randia dumetorum in India and Gardenia jasminoides in Laos and Thailand.
