= Snake vine =

Plants with the common name snake vine include:

- Hibbertia scandens, a sprawling plant in the family Dilleniaceae
- Stephania japonica, a climbing vine in the family Menispermaceae
