= H. scandens =

H. scandens may refer to:

- Hibbertia scandens, the snake vine, climbing Guinea flower or golden Guinea vine, a plant species native to Australia
- Humulus scandens, a synonym for Humulus japonicus, a plant species
