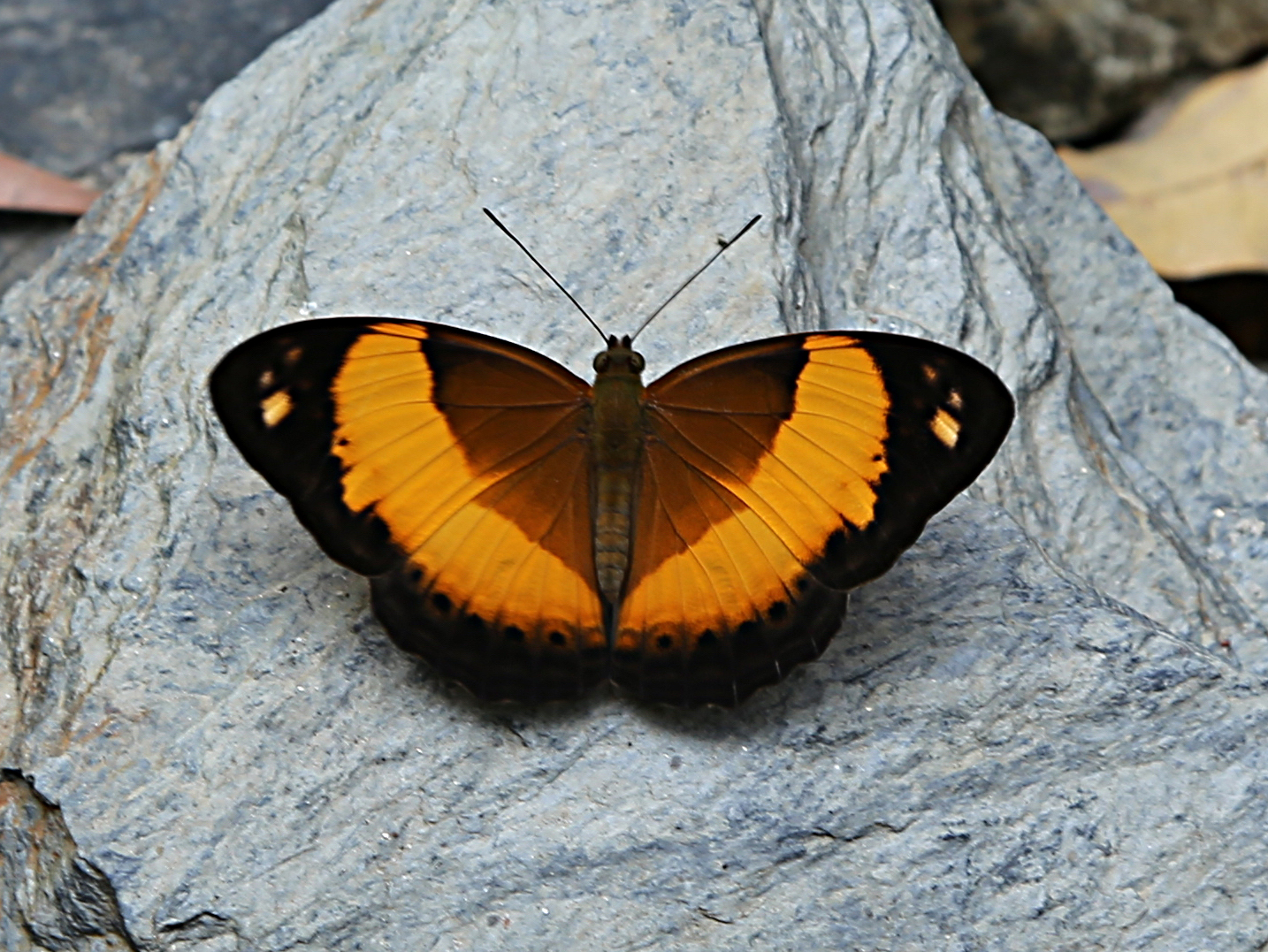
- Cupha prosope

Scientific classification
- Kingdom: Animalia
- Phylum: Arthropoda
- Clade: Pancrustacea
- Class: Insecta
- Order: Lepidoptera
- Family: Nymphalidae
- Subfamily: Heliconiinae
- Tribe: Vagrantini
- Genus: Cupha; Billberg, 1820

Synonyms
- Messaras Doubleday, [1848]

= Cupha =

Genus of brush-footed butterflies

Cupha is a butterfly genus of the family Nymphalidae found in the Indomalayan and the Australasian realms.

The Cupha species are sharply divided from related genera by two characters: the thread like almost clubless antennae and the fourth subcostal nervure of the forewings finishing in the costal border. Only Cirrochroa possesses a similarly formed antennae, but it can immediately be separated as only one subcostal nervure branches before the end of the cell and through the position of the fourth nervure. In all the other genera it finishes either in the apex or in the outer border The species have rounded wings and undersides with eye-spots resemble Satyridae.

The contained species are:

- Cupha arias C. & R. Felder, [1867]
- Cupha crameri (Felder, 1860)
- Cupha erymanthis (Drury, [1773])
- Cupha lampetia (Linnaeus, 1764)
- Cupha maeonides (Hewitson, 1859)
- Cupha melichrysos (Mathew, 1887)
- Cupha myronides Felder, 1860
- Cupha prosope (Fabricius, 1775)
- Cupha aureus Samson, 1980
