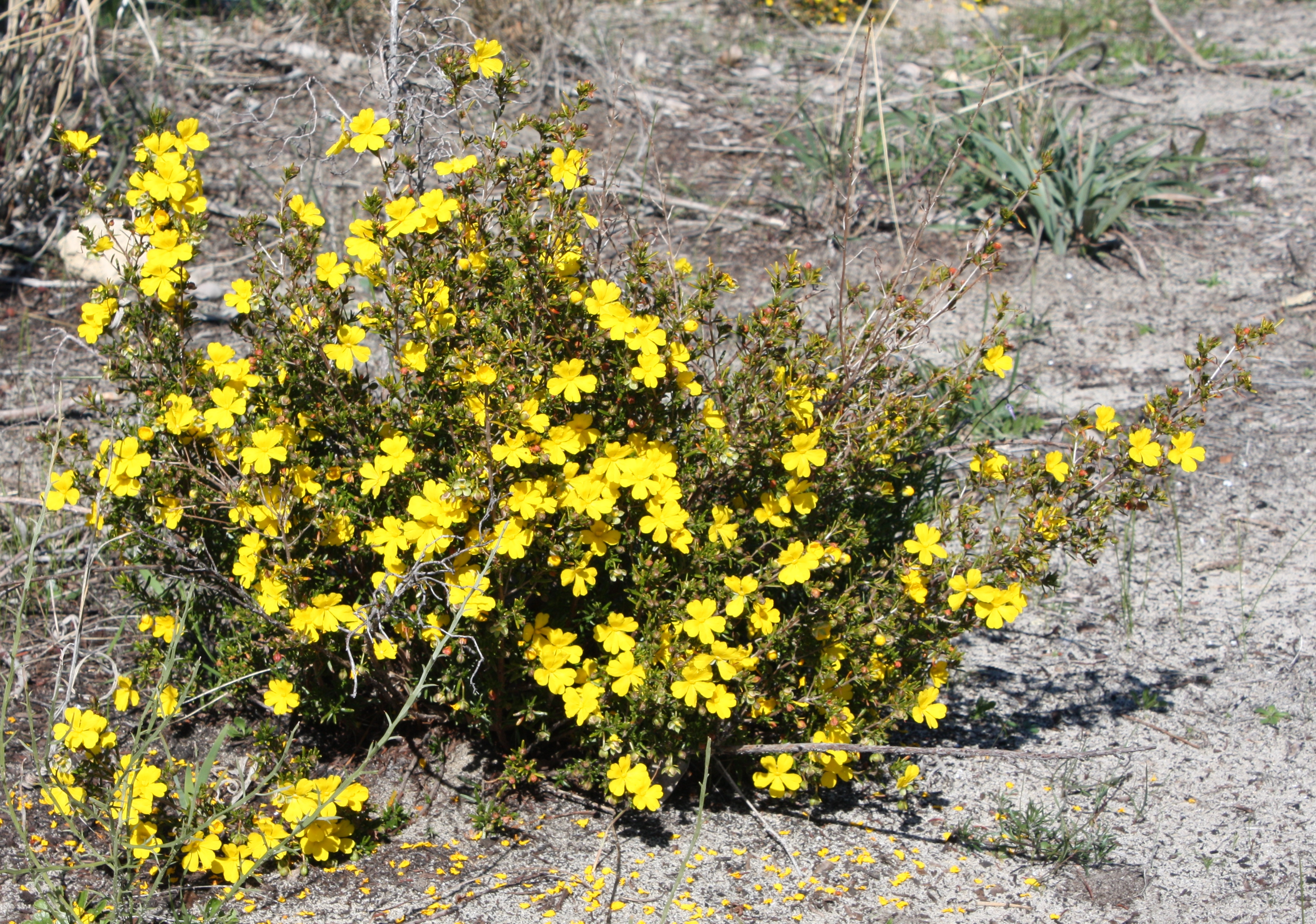
- Hibbertia hypericoides in Wireless Hill Park

Scientific classification
- Kingdom: Plantae
- Clade: Tracheophytes
- Clade: Angiosperms
- Clade: Eudicots
- Order: Dilleniales
- Family: Dilleniaceae
- Genus: Hibbertia
- Species: H. hypericoides

Binomial name
- Hibbertia hypericoides (DC.) Benth.

= Hibbertia hypericoides =

Yellow buttercups

Species of flowering plant

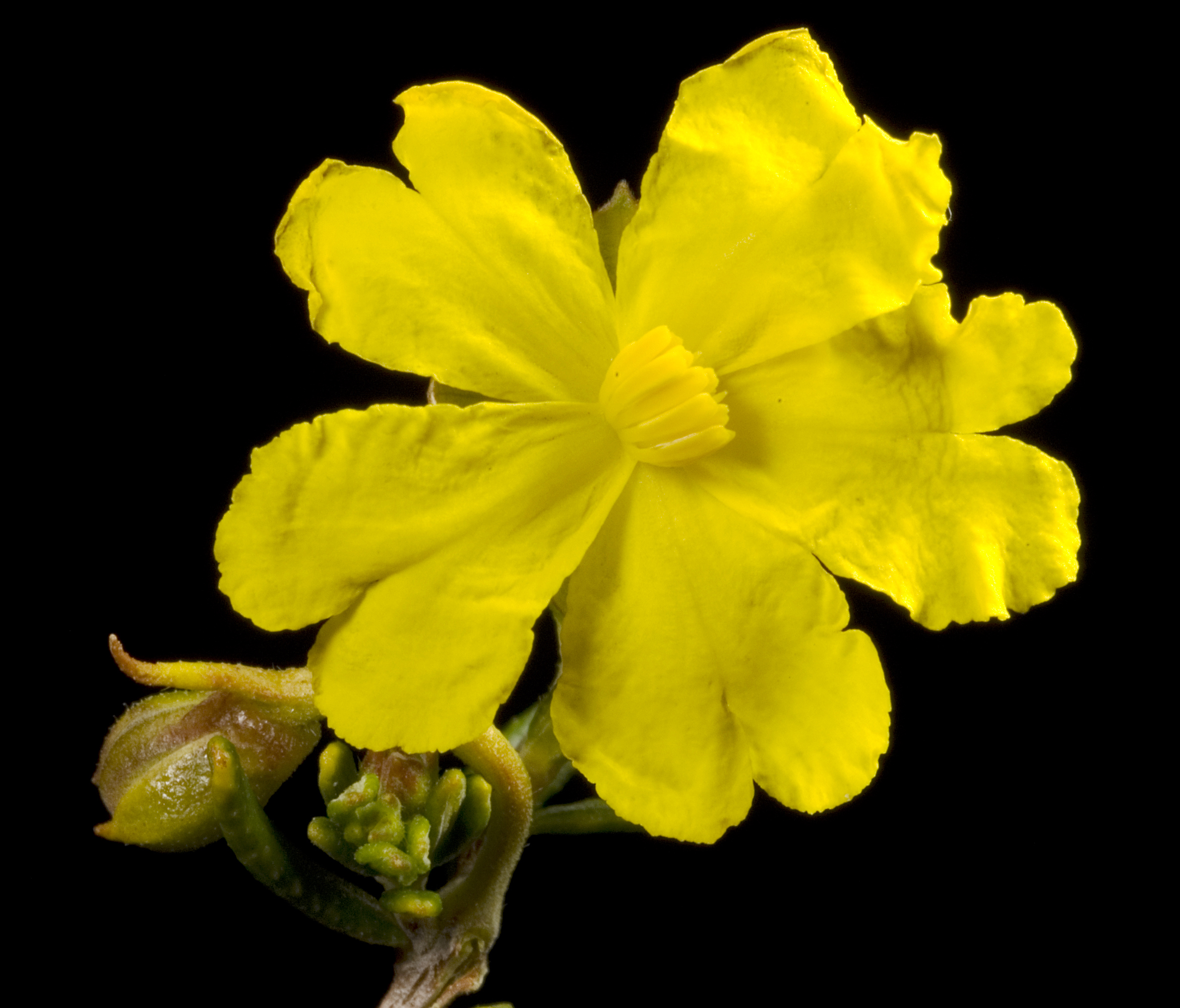
Flower detail

Hibbertia hypericoides, commonly known as yellow buttercups, is a species of flowering plant in the family Dilleniaceae, and is endemic to the south-west of Western Australia. It is usually a spreading shrub with linear to elliptic or egg-shaped leaves, and yellow flowers, usually with ten to fifteen stamens arranged in a cluster on one side of the two densely hairy carpels.

== Description ==
Hibbertia hypericoides is a spreading shrub, rarely an erect shrub, that typically grows to a height of up to 30–80 cm (12–31 in) with densely hairy branchlets. The leaves are linear to elliptic or egg-shaped with the narrower end towards the base, 15–25 mm (0.59–0.98 in) long and 1–8 mm (0.039–0.315 in) wide. The upper surface is mostly glabrous, the edges of the leaves are turned down or rolled under and the lower surface in densely covered with white hairs. The flowers are arranged singly in leaf axils or on the ends of the branchlets on a peduncle 4–12 mm (0.16–0.47 in) long, with a bract 4.5–6 mm (0.18–0.24 in) long at the base. The five sepals are hairy, 5.5–6.8 mm (0.22–0.27 in) long and the five petals are yellow and egg-shaped with the narrower end towards the base, 10–13 mm (0.39–0.51 in) long with a notch on the end. There are usually ten to fifteen stamens arranged in a single cluster on one side of the two carpels as well as seven to twenty staminodes in bundles. The carpels are densely hairy and each has two ovules.

== Taxonomy ==
This species was first formally described in 1817 by Augustin Pyramus de Candolle who gave it the name Pleurandra hypericoides in his book Regni Vegetabilis Systema Naturale. In 1863, George Bentham changed the name to Hibbertia hypericoides in Flora Australiensis. The specific epithet (hypericoides) means "Hypericum-like".

In 1995, Kevin Thiele and Geoff Cockerton described two subspecies in the journal Nuytsia and the names are accepted by the Australian Plant Census:

- Hibbertia hypericoides (DC.) Benth. subsp. hypericoides has glossy, dark green leaves with the edges rolled under;
- Hibbertia hypericoides subsp. septentrionalis K.R.Thiele & Cockerton has dull, greyish-green leaves with more or less flat edges.

== Distribution and habitat ==
Subspecies hypericoides grows in a wide variety of habitats including woodland and shrubland and is widely distributed from Dongara to Augusta and inland as far as Wongan Hills. Subspecies septentrionalis typically grows in kwongan and Banksia woodland and is found in two disjunct populations - one between Kalbarri and Dongara and the other inland from the Arrowsmith River.

== Ecology ==
Some pollination surveys place beetles (from the Scarabaeidae, Chrysomelidae and Curculionidae) as the main pollinators of Hibbertia hypericoides, as well as Hibbertia scandens (Willd.) Gilg, and other species from the Dilleniaceae family, they also place bees and flies as secondary importance (such as Keighery 1975).

== Conservation status ==
Both subspecies of H. hypericoides are listed as "not threatened" by the Government of Western Australia Department of Parks and Wildlife.

== See also ==
- List of Hibbertia species
