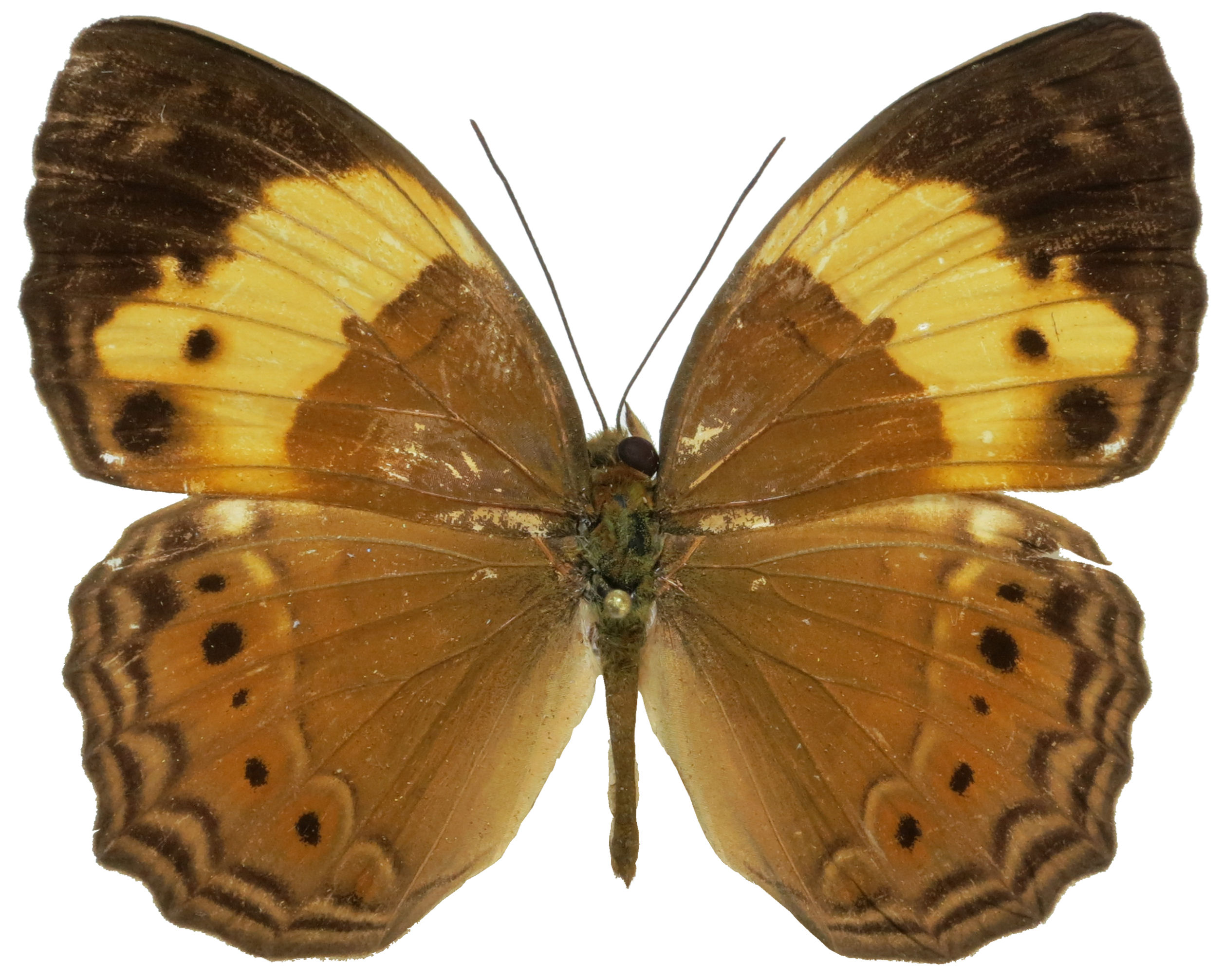
- Cupha arias cacina - Balabac, Palawan, Philippines

Scientific classification
- Domain: Eukaryota
- Kingdom: Animalia
- Phylum: Arthropoda
- Class: Insecta
- Order: Lepidoptera
- Family: Nymphalidae
- Genus: Cupha
- Species: C. arias

Binomial name
- Cupha arias (C. & R. Felder, 1867)

Synonyms
- Messaras arias C. & R. Felder, [1867]; Cupha erymanthis muna Fruhstorfer, 1898; Cupha erymanthis celebensis Fruhstorfer, 1900; Cupha arius fedora Fruhstorfer, 1900

= Cupha arias =

Species of butterfly

Cupha arias is an Indomalayan species of heliconiine butterfly.

== Subspecies ==
- C. a. arias (North Philippines)
- C. a. dapatana Grose-Smith, 1887 (South Philippines)
- C. a. cacina Fruhstorfer, 1912 (Palawan, Balabac, Borneo)
- C. a. muna Fruhstorfer, 1898 (Muna Island)
- C. a. celebensis Fruhstorfer, 1900 (Sulawesi)
- C. a. sangirica Fruhstorfer, 1912 (Sangihe, Talaud)
