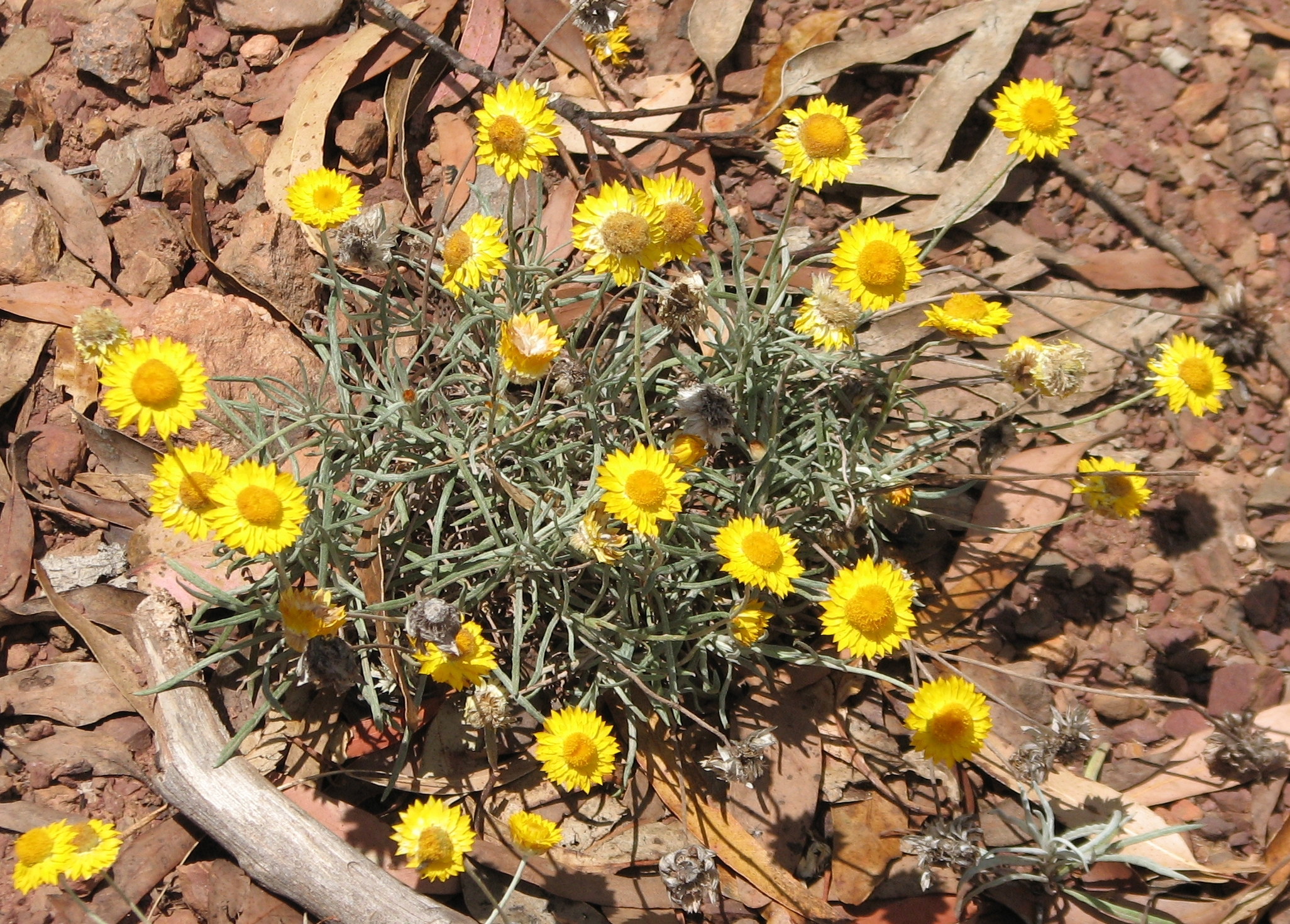
- Leucochrysum albicans

Scientific classification
- Kingdom: Plantae
- Clade: Embryophytes
- Clade: Tracheophytes
- Clade: Angiosperms
- Clade: Eudicots
- Clade: Asterids
- Order: Asterales
- Family: Asteraceae
- Subfamily: Asteroideae
- Tribe: Gnaphalieae
- Genus: Leucochrysum (DC.) Paul G.Wilson

Synonyms
- Helipterum sect. Leucochrysum A.Cunn. ex DC.

= Leucochrysum =

Genus of flowering plants

Leucochrysum is a genus of flowering plants in the tribe Gnaphalieae within the family Asteraceae, endemic to Australia.

Species

- Leucochrysum albicans (A.Cunn.) Paul G.Wilson
- Leucochrysum alpinum (F.Muell.) R.J.Dennis & N.G.Walsh
- Leucochrysum fitzgibbonii (F.Muell.) Paul G.Wilson
- Leucochrysum graminifolium (Paul G.Wilson) Paul G.Wilson
- Leucochrysum molle (A.Cunn. ex DC.) Paul G.Wilson
- Leucochrysum stipitatum (F.Muell.) Paul G.Wilson
