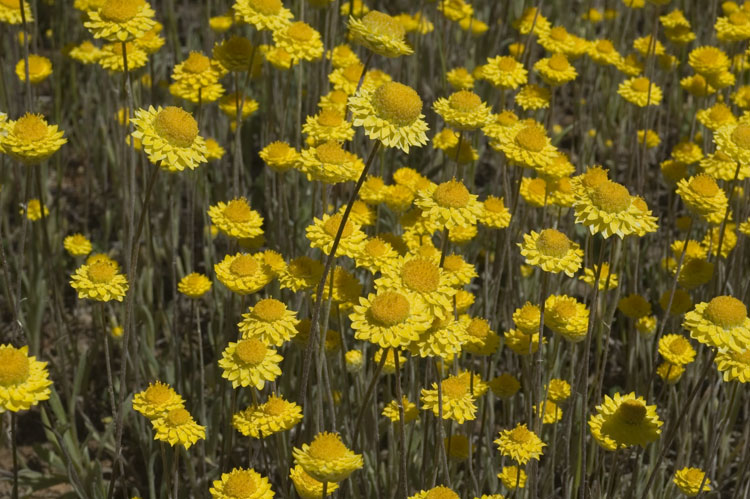

Scientific classification
- Kingdom: Plantae
- Clade: Tracheophytes
- Clade: Angiosperms
- Clade: Eudicots
- Clade: Asterids
- Order: Asterales
- Family: Asteraceae
- Genus: Leucochrysum
- Species: L. molle

Binomial name
- Leucochrysum molle (A.Cunn. ex DC.) Paul G.Wilson

= Leucochrysum molle =

Hoary sunray

Species of flowering plant

Leucochrysum molle, commonly known as hoary sunray, is a flowering plant in the family Asteraceae. It is a small, clumping perennial with grey leaves, yellow flower-heads and is endemic to Australia.

== Description ==
Leucochrysum molle is a clumping, woolly annual or occasionally a perennial to 30 cm (12 in) high. The leaves are narrowly lance-shaped to narrow-oblong, woolly, up to 7 cm (2.8 in) long, 2–6 mm (0.079–0.236 in) wide, grey, rounded or tapering to a point at the apex. The flower heads 2–2.5 cm (0.79–0.98 in) in diameter, borne singly on a slim peduncle 15 cm (5.9 in) long. The outer bracts light brown, inner bracts triangular to oval-shaped or almost circular, yellow, arranged in rows and lamina 3–10 mm (0.12–0.39 in) long. Flowering occurs in spring and the fruit is a cypsela about 3 mm (0.12 in) long, brown and sometimes warty.

== Taxonomy and naming ==
This species was first described in 1838 as Helichrysum molle by Augustin Pyramus de Candolle from an unpublished description by Allan Cunningham. In 1992 Paul G. Wilson changed the name to Leucochrysum molle and the description was published in Nuytsia. The specific epithet (molle) means "soft".

== Distribution and habitat ==
Hoary sunray grows on a variety of soil types in woodlands, grasslands and sandplains in New South Wales, Queensland, South Australia and Victoria.
