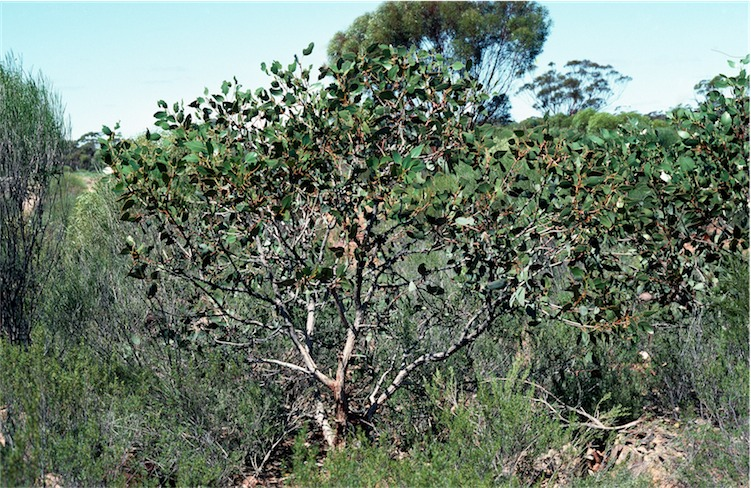
- Eucalyptus grossa near Balladonia

Scientific classification
- Kingdom: Plantae
- Clade: Embryophytes
- Clade: Tracheophytes
- Clade: Spermatophytes
- Clade: Angiosperms
- Clade: Eudicots
- Clade: Rosids
- Order: Myrtales
- Family: Myrtaceae
- Genus: Eucalyptus
- Species: E. grossa

Binomial name
- Eucalyptus grossa F.Muell. ex Benth.

Synonyms
- Eucalyptus incrassata var. grossa (F.Muell. ex Benth.) Maiden

= Eucalyptus grossa =

Coarse-leaved mallee

Species of eucalyptus

Eucalyptus grossa, commonly known as coarse-leaved mallee, is a species of mallee or rarely a straggly tree, that is endemic to Western Australia. It has rough, fibrous bark on the trunk and all but the thinnest branches, broadly lance-shaped to egg-shaped adult leaves, flower buds in groups of seven, yellowish green flowers and cup-shaped to cylindrical fruit.

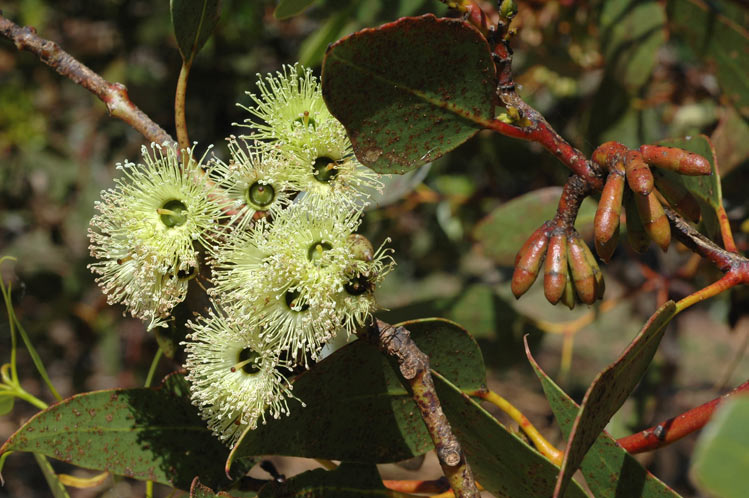
Flowers and buds

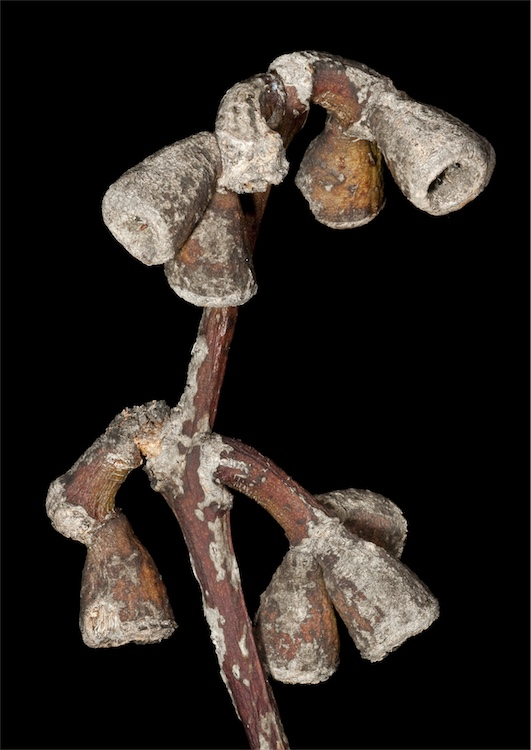
Fruit

== Description ==
Eucalyptus grossa is a mallee, rarely a straggly tree or sometimes a shrub, that grows to a height of 0.5–5 m (1 ft 8 in – 16 ft 5 in) and forms a lignotuber. It has rough, fibrous, grey to brownish bark on the trunk and branches. Young plants and coppice regrowth have more or less egg-shaped leaves that are 45–80 mm (1.8–3.1 in) long and 30–55 mm (1.2–2.2 in) wide. Adult leaves are egg-shaped to broadly lance-shaped, glossy green, 75–125 mm (3.0–4.9 in) long and 25–55 mm (0.98–2.17 in) wide on a petiole 15–45 mm (0.59–1.77 in) long. The flower buds are arranged in leaf axils on a thick, downturned, unbranched peduncle 10–35 mm (0.39–1.38 in) long, the individual buds sessile or on thick pedicels up to 2 mm (0.079 in) long. Mature buds are 18–32 mm (0.71–1.26 in) long and 7–13 mm (0.28–0.51 in) wide with a conical operculum. Flowering occurs mainly from August to November and the flowers are yellowish green. The fuit is a woody, cylindrical capsule 14,020 mm (552 in) long and 10–15 mm (0.39–0.59 in) wide with the valves at or below rim level.

== Taxonomy and naming ==
Eucalyptus grossa was first formally described in 1867 by George Bentham in Flora Australiensis from an unpublished description by Ferdinand von Mueller. The type collection was made by George Maxwell near the Phillips River and its tributaries. The specific epithet (grossa) is from the Latin grossus, meaning 'thick' or 'coarse', referring to the leaves, buds and fruit.

== Distribution and habitat ==
Coarse-leaved mallee grows around granite rocks and in thickets on flat and slightly undulating ground from near Newdegate to the south and east of Norseman in the Coolgardie, Esperance Plains and Mallee biogeographic regions.

== Taxonomy ==
The species was first formally described by botanist George Bentham in 1867.

== Conservation status ==
This eucalypt is classified as "not threatened" by the Western Australian Government Department of Parks and Wildlife.

== Uses ==
=== Use in horticulture ===
This species has ornamental flowers and can be maintained as a dense, compact shrub if regular pruning is undertaken. It has proved adaptable to a wide range of conditions in temperate areas in Australia.

=== Cultural references ===
The coarse-leaved mallee appeared on a 50 cent Australian postage stamp in 2005.

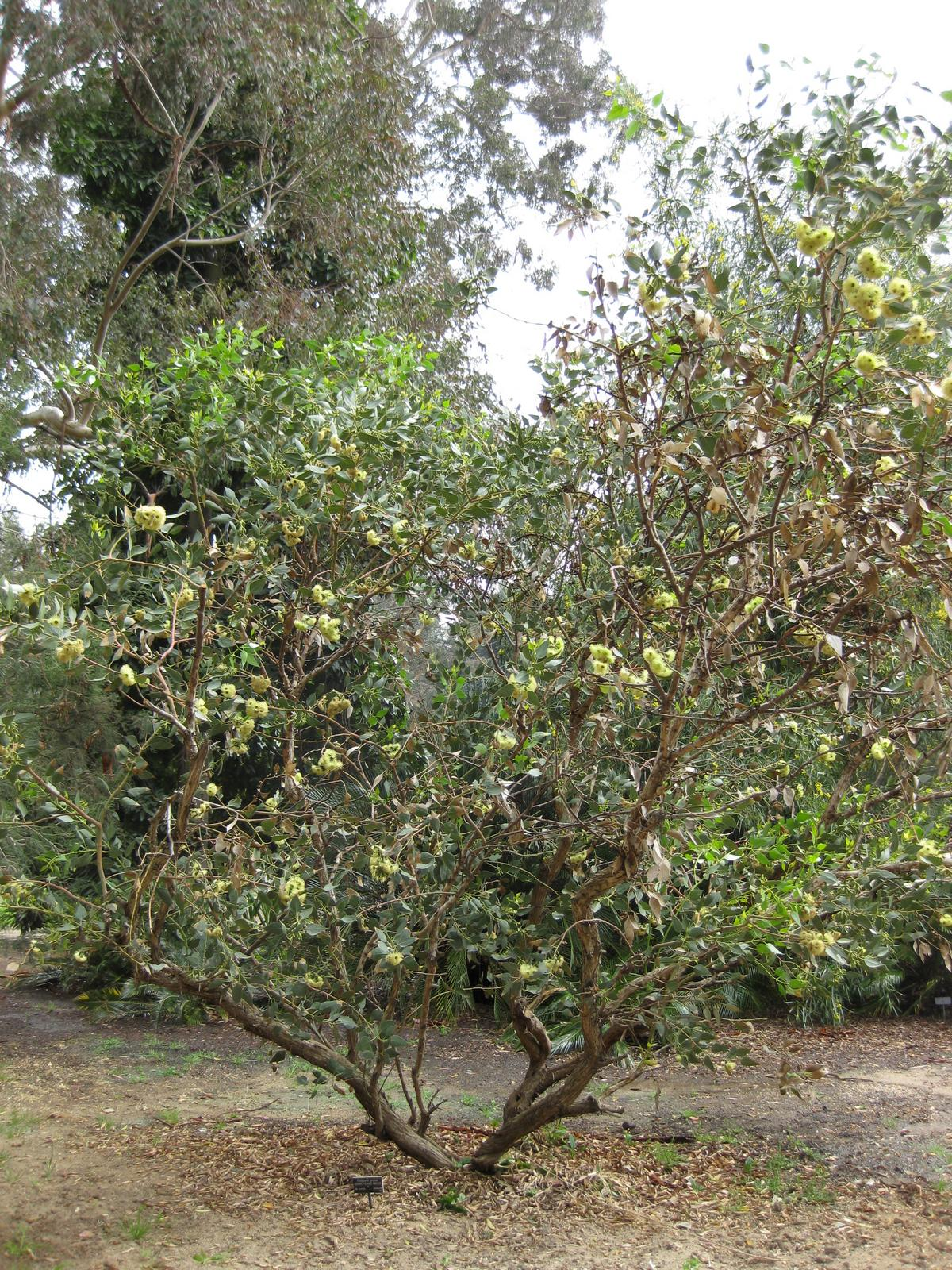
Cultivated specimen in Huntington Gardens, Los Angeles

== See also ==
- List of Eucalyptus species
- List of flora on stamps of Australia
