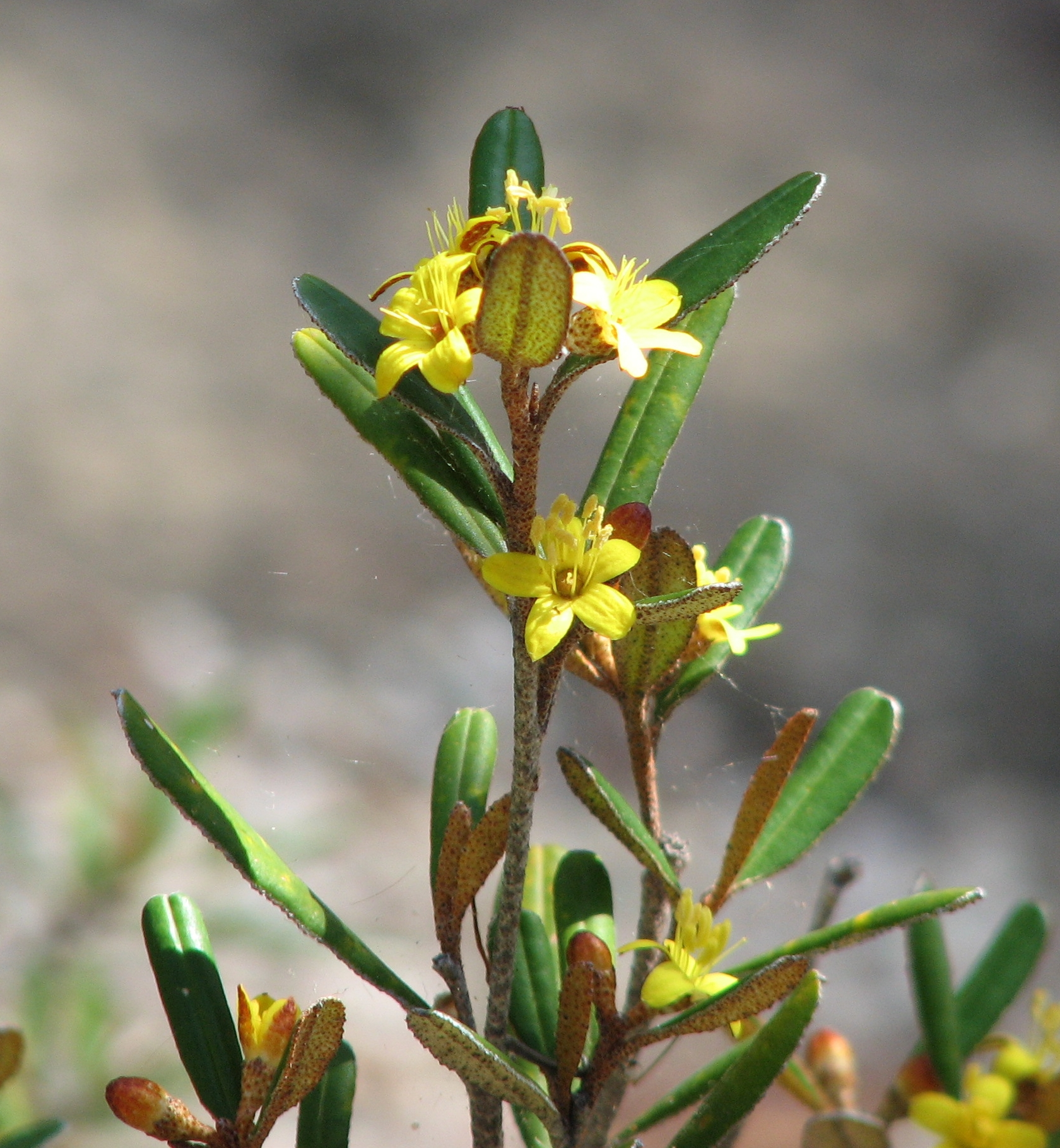
- In Maranoa Gardens

Conservation status
- Vulnerable (EPBC Act)

Scientific classification
- Kingdom: Plantae
- Clade: Tracheophytes
- Clade: Angiosperms
- Clade: Eudicots
- Clade: Rosids
- Order: Sapindales
- Family: Rutaceae
- Genus: Phebalium
- Species: P. whitei

Binomial name
- Phebalium whitei Paul G.Wilson

Synonyms
- Phebalium squamulosum var. grandiflorum C.T.White

= Phebalium whitei =

Species of shrub

Phebalium whitei is a small shrub that is endemic to south-east Queensland. It has branchlets covered with silvery and rust-coloured scales, leathery, oblong to elliptic leaves and bright yellow flowers arranged in sessile umbels on the ends of branchlets.

== Description ==
Phebalium whitei is a shrub that typically grows to a height of about 1 m (3 ft 3 in) and has silvery to rust-coloured scales on its branchlets. Its leaves are leathery, oblong to elliptic, 10–70 mm (0.39–2.76 in) long and about 15 mm (0.59 in) wide on a petiole 3–6 mm (0.12–0.24 in) long. The leaves are oval in outline, the upper surface smooth and glabrous, the lower surface covered with silvery scales. The flowers are arranged in sessile umbels of up to six flowers, each on a thick pedicel 2–4 mm (0.079–0.157 in) long. The calyx is hemispherical, about 2.5 mm (0.098 in) high, 3.5 mm (0.14 in) wide and covered with silvery and rust-coloured scales. The petals are bright yellow, elliptic to egg-shaped, about 9 mm (0.35 in) long and 3 mm (0.12 in) wide with silvery and rust-coloured scales on the back. Flowering occurs from June to September.

== Taxonomy ==
This phebalium was originally described in 1939 as Phebalium squamulosum var. grandiflorum by Cyril Tenison White. The type specimen was obtained from Wyberba in 1932. In 1970 Paul Wilson raised the variety to species status in the journal Nuytsia and gave it the name Phebalium whitei in honour of C.T. White.

== Distribution and habitat ==
This phebalium occurs in the Stanthorpe region of south-east Queensland, where it is found in damp areas such as in cracks in flat expanses of granite or along creek banks, sometimes also in open heathland.

== Conservation status ==
Phebalium whitei is listed as "vulnerable" under the Australian Government Environment Protection and Biodiversity Conservation Act 1999 and the Queensland Government Nature Conservation Act 1992. The main threats to the species are inappropriate fire regimes and increasing visitor pressure in Girraween National Park.

== Cultural references ==
Phebalium whitei was depicted on an Australia Post postage stamp issued in February 2007 depicting the species.

== See also ==
- List of flora on stamps of Australia
