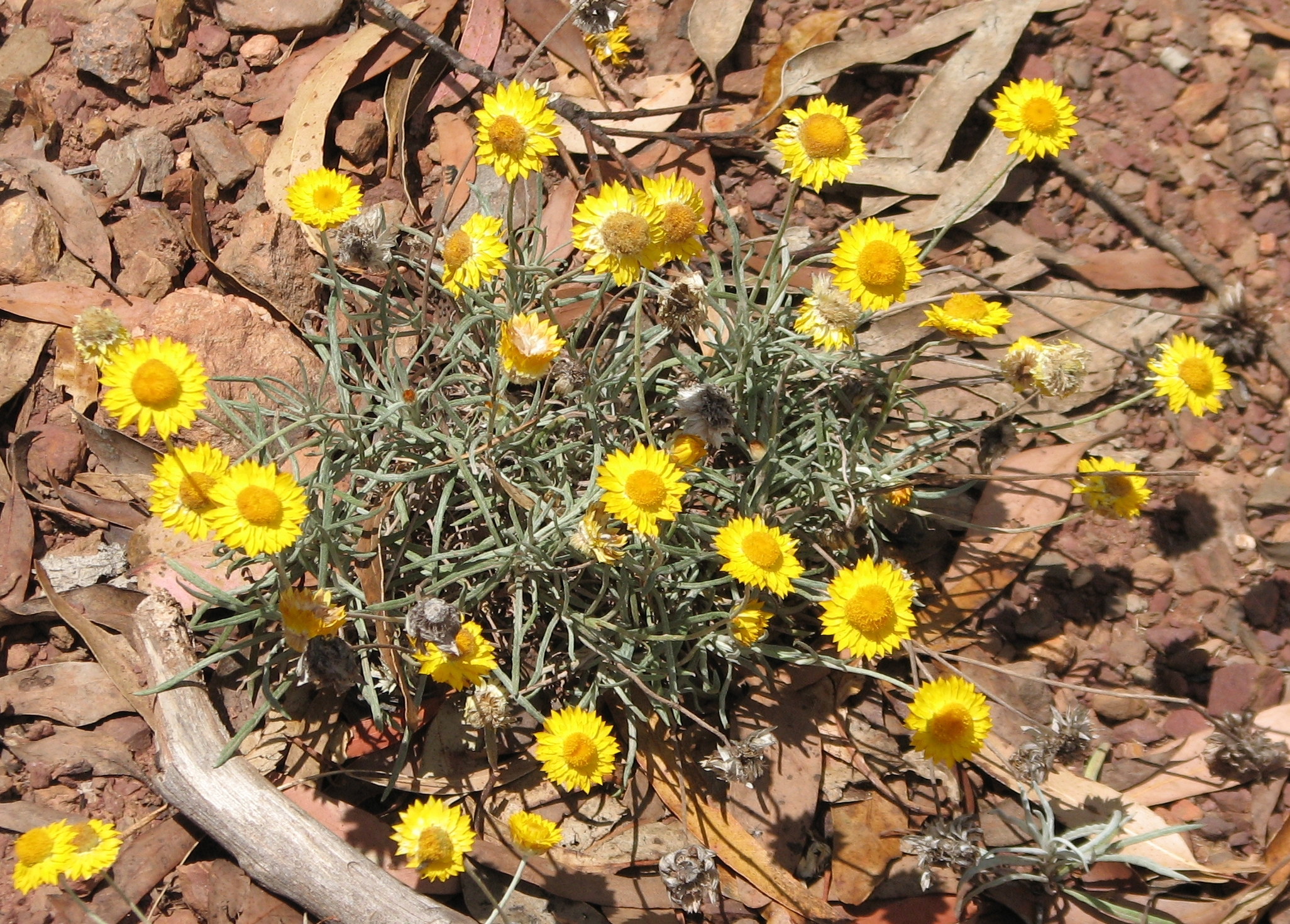
- Near Licola, Victoria

Conservation status
- Endangered (EPBC Act)

Scientific classification
- Kingdom: Plantae
- Clade: Tracheophytes
- Clade: Angiosperms
- Clade: Eudicots
- Clade: Asterids
- Order: Asterales
- Family: Asteraceae
- Genus: Leucochrysum
- Species: L. albicans

Binomial name
- Leucochrysum albicans (A.Cunn.) Paul G.Wilson

Synonyms
- Argyrocome albicans (A.Cunn.) Kuntze; Elichrysum albicans A.Cunn. orth. var.; Helichrysum albicans A.Cunn.; Helipterum albicans (A.Cunn.) DC.; Roccardia albicans (A.Cunn.) Voss

= Leucochrysum albicans =

Species of flowering plant

Leucochrysum albicans, commonly known as hoary sunray, is a flowering plant in the family Asteraceae. It is a small perennial with grey leaves, white or yellow flower-heads and is endemic to Australia.

== Description ==
Leucochrysum albicans is an upright, tufted perennial to 45 cm (18 in) high. The leaves are linear to oblong or broadly egg-shaped, woolly, 2–10 cm (0.79–3.94 in) long, 1–9 mm (0.039–0.354 in) wide, light grey and crowded near the base of the stems. The flower heads 2–4 cm (0.79–1.57 in) in diameter, borne singly on a slim peduncle 7–15 cm (2.8–5.9 in) long. The outer bracts brown, inner bracts white or yellow in rows, triangular to narrow-elliptic shaped with a woolly lamina at the base. Flowering occurs in spring and summer and the fruit is an achene 3 mm (0.12 in) long and covered with feathery-like white bristles.

== Taxonomy and naming ==
The species was first formally described by botanist Allan Cunningham in 1825 in Geographical Memoirs on New South Wales and gave it the name Helichrysum albicans. In 1992 Paul Graham Wilson changed the name to Leucochrysum albicans in the journal Nuytsia. The specific epithet (albicans) means "whitish".

In the same edition of the journal Nuytsia, Wilson described three varieties and two subspecies, albicans and alpinum of L. albicans. In 2010 Neville Grant Walsh transferred von Mueller's Helipterum incanum var. alpinum to Leucochrysum as L. alpinum in the journal Muelleria, including L. leucochrysum subsp. alpinum as a synonym. In a 2015 edition of Muelleria, Walsh raised the rank of de Candolle's Helipterum incanum var. tricolor to subspecies as L. albicans subsp. tricolor.

The names of the two subspecies have been accepted by the Australian Plant Census:

- Leucochrysum albicans (A.Cunn.) Paul G.Wilson subsp. albicans has yellow inner involucral bracts.
- Leucochrysum albicans (DC.) N.G.Walsh subsp. tricolor has white inner involucral bracts.

== Distribution and habitat ==
Hoary sunray is a widespread species found growing in moist, rocky alpine locations in woodlands and grasslands on nutrient poor soils in New South Wales, Victoria, Queensland and Tasmania. Subspecies tricolor mainly grows in grassland or grassy woodland at altitudes between about 100 and 900 m (330 and 2,950 ft) in disjunct populations in Tasmania, Victoria and south-eastern New South Wales, although it has not been recorded this century in Victoria.

== Conservation status ==
Subspecies tricolor is listed as "endangered" under the Australian Government Environment Protection and Biodiversity Conservation Act 1999, the New South Wales Government Biodiversity Conservation Act 2016 and the Victorian Government Flora and Fauna Guarantee Act 1988. A National Recovery Plan has been prepared.

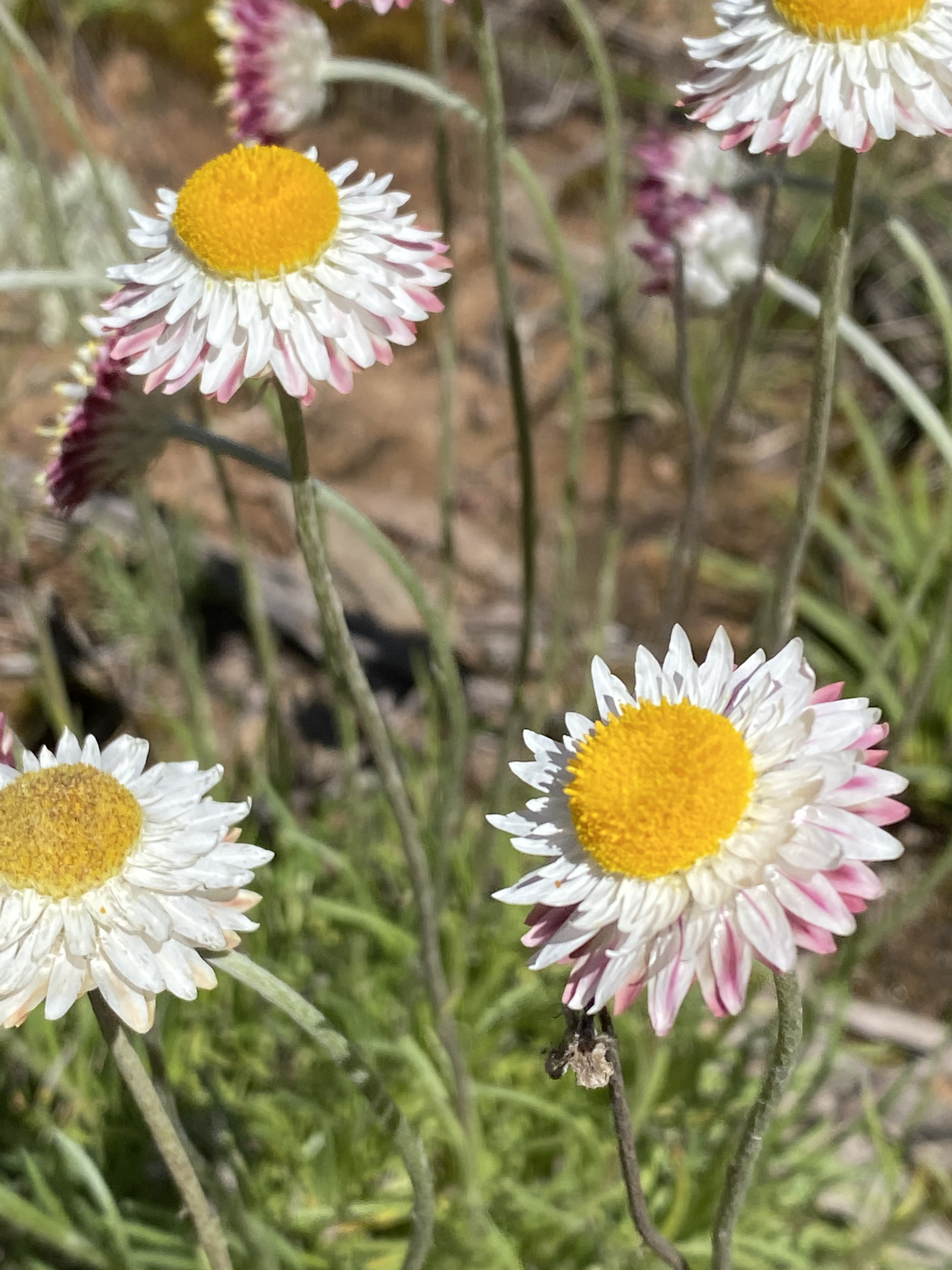
White form

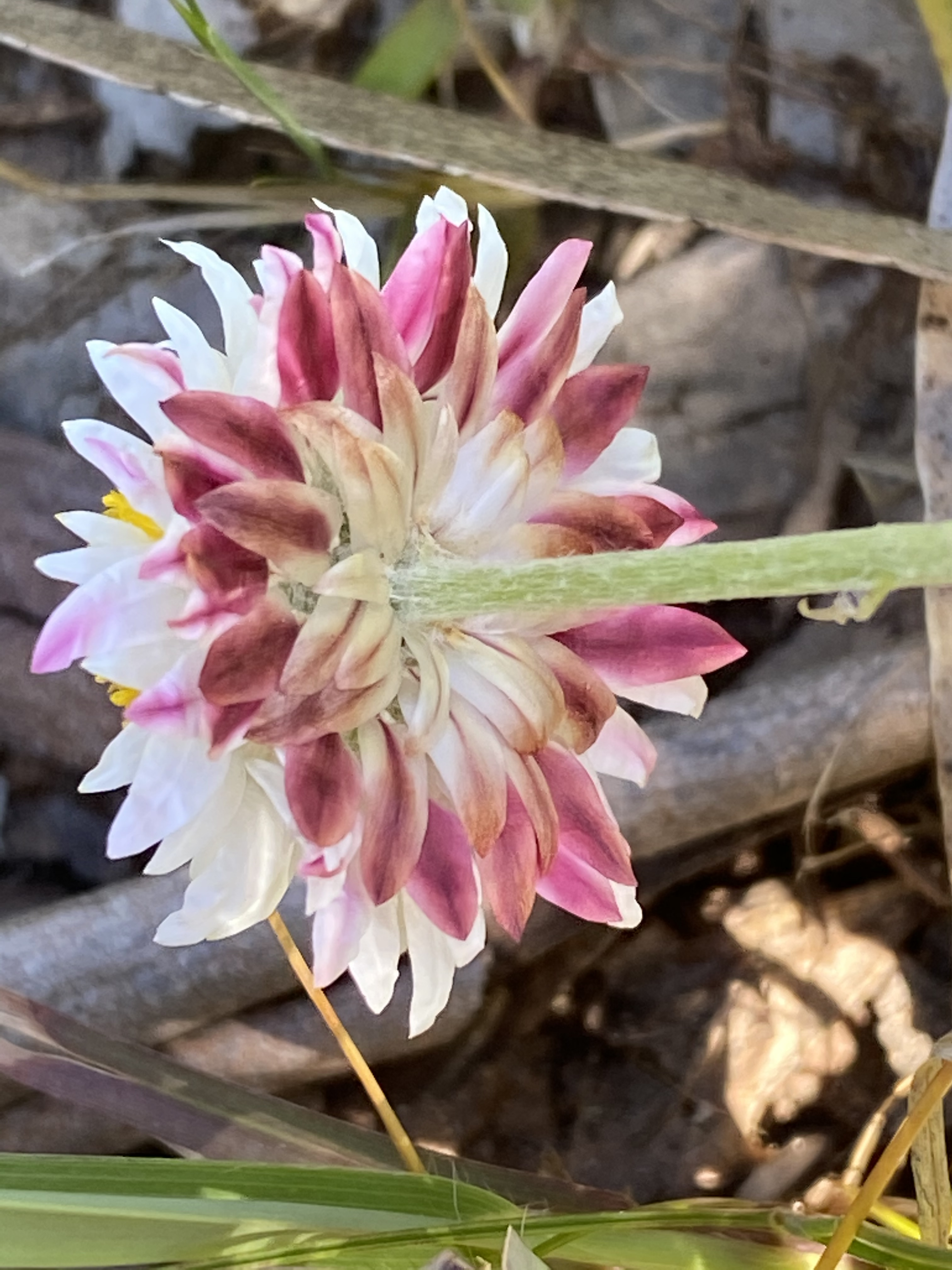
Bracts

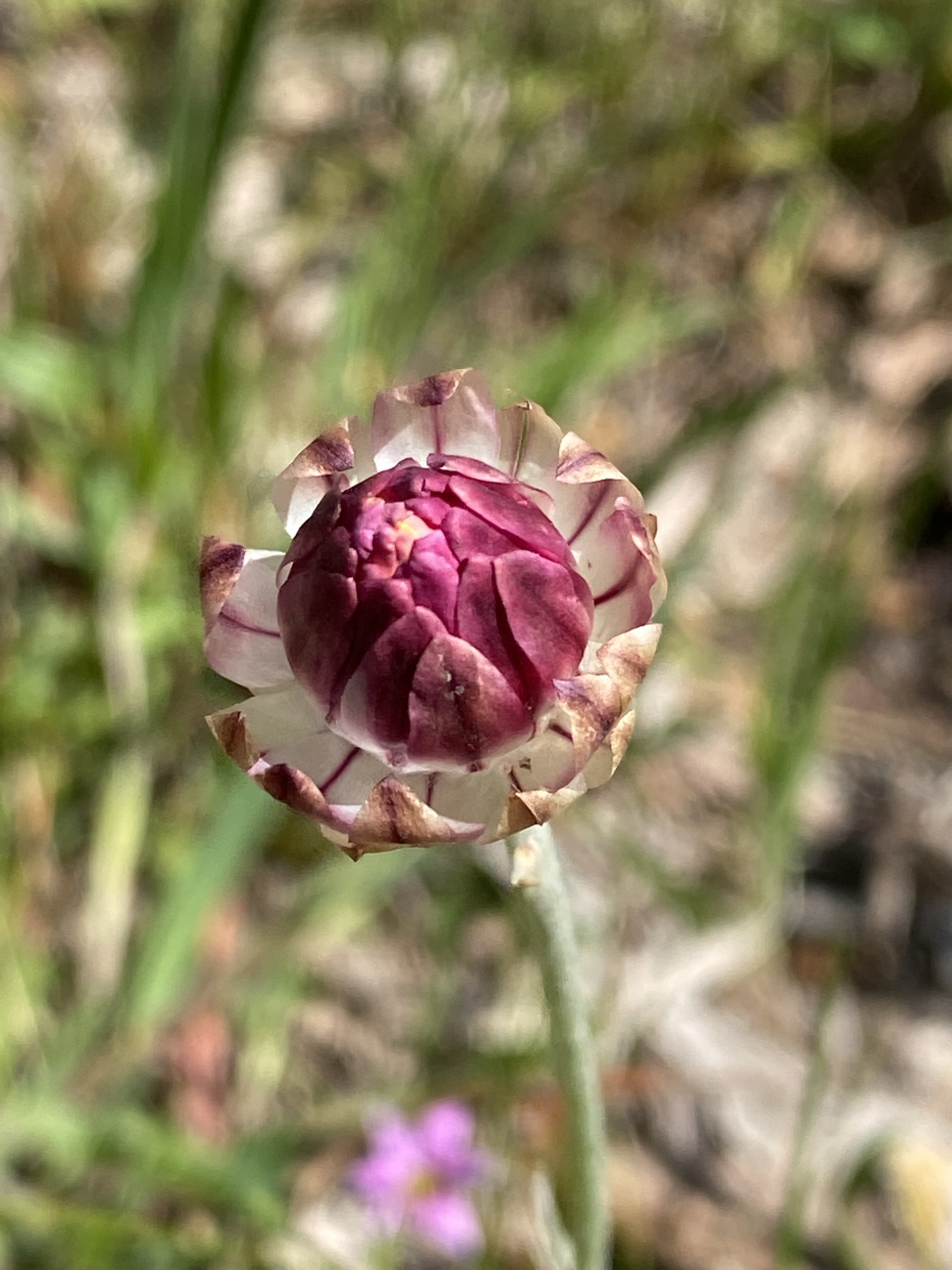
Bud
