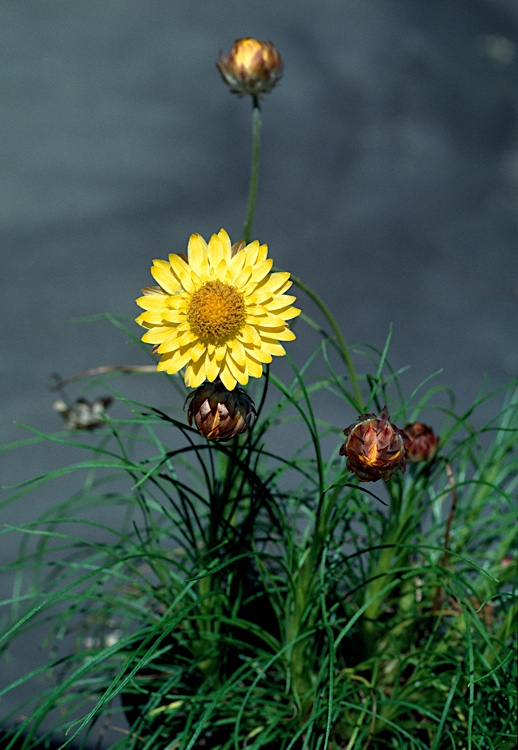
- In the Australian National Botanic Gardens

Scientific classification
- Kingdom: Plantae
- Clade: Tracheophytes
- Clade: Angiosperms
- Clade: Eudicots
- Clade: Asterids
- Order: Asterales
- Family: Asteraceae
- Genus: Leucochrysum
- Species: L. graminifolium

Binomial name
- Leucochrysum graminifolium (Paul G.Wilson) Paul G.Wilson

Synonyms
- Helipterum albicans var. graminifolium Paul G.Wilson

= Leucochrysum graminifolium =

Pagoda rock daisy

Species of flowering plant

Leucochrysum graminifolium, commonly known as pagoda rock daisy, is a flowering plant in the family Asteraceae. It is a small perennial with narrow leaves, yellow flower-heads and is endemic to New South Wales.

== Description ==
Leucochrysum graminifolium is upright, small, tufted perennial herb to 20 cm (7.9 in) high with a woody rootstock. The leaves are greyish-green, thread-like, crowded, up to 7 cm (2.8 in) long, edges rolled, upper surface smooth, lower surface woolly. The single daisy-like yellow flowers are on slender peducles about 8 cm (3.1 in) long, the bracts are spreading, 2–3 cm (0.79–1.18 in) in diameter, arranged in multiple rows. The outer bracts are light brown, the inner bracts pale yellow and the edges of the bracts are woolly at the base. Flowering occurs from October to March and the fruit is 2–3 mm (0.079–0.118 in) long and bristly.

== Taxonomy and naming ==
In 1960, Paul G.Wilson described a new variety of Helipterum albicans that he gave the name var. graminifolium in Transactions of the Royal Society of South Australia. In 1992 Wilson raised the variety to species status as Leucochrysum graminifolium in the journal Nuytsia. The specific epithet (graminifolium) means "grass leaf".

== Distribution and habitat ==
Pagoda rock daisy grows on sandy soil in exposed places between the Lithgow district, Newnes and the Wolgan Valley in New South Wales.
