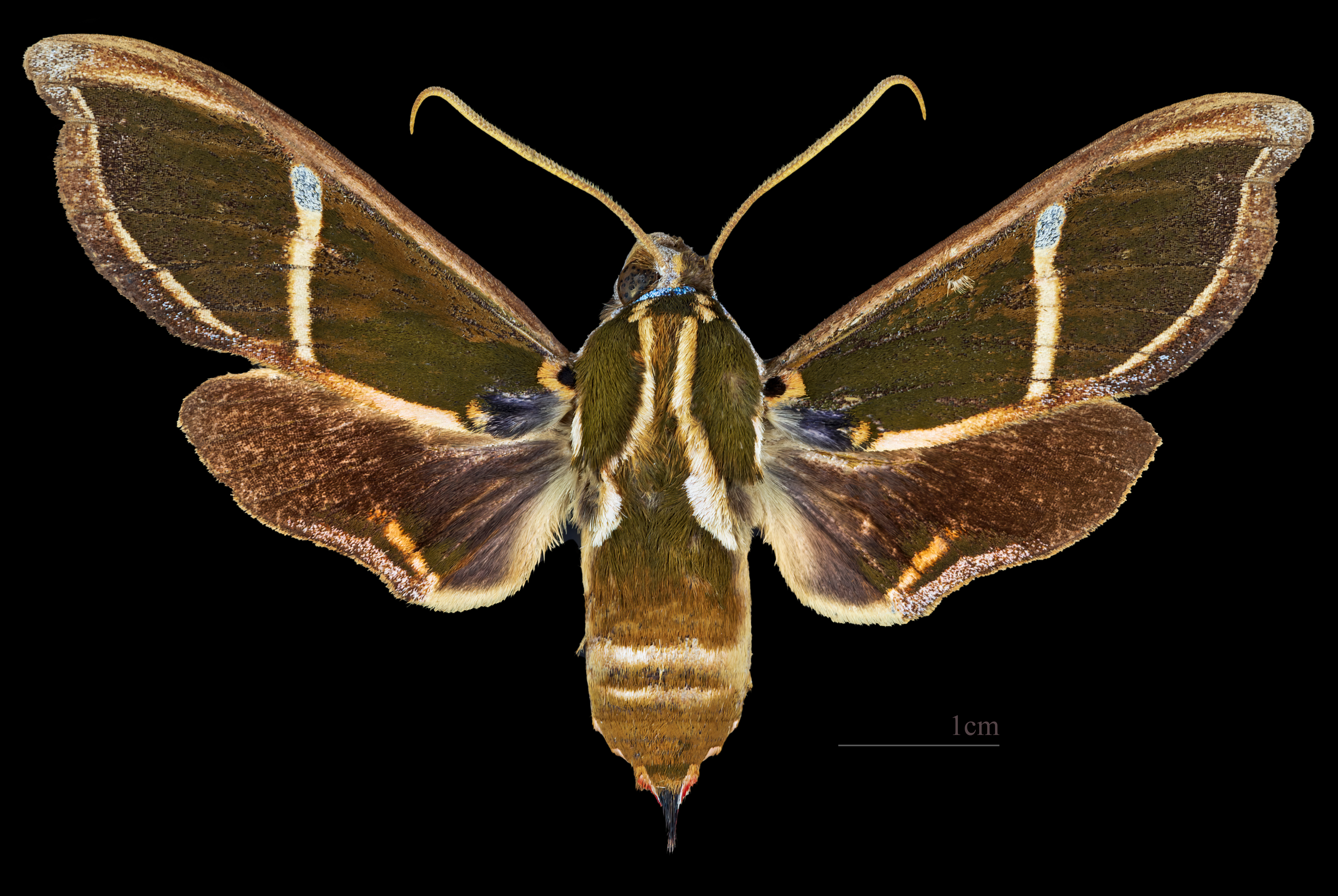
- Cizara ardeniae

Scientific classification
- Domain: Eukaryota
- Kingdom: Animalia
- Phylum: Arthropoda
- Class: Insecta
- Order: Lepidoptera
- Family: Sphingidae
- Subtribe: Macroglossina
- Genus: Cizara; Walker, 1856

Synonyms
- Abrisa Kirby, 1892; Microlophia R. Felder, 1874

= Cizara =

Genus of moths

Cizara is a genus of moths in the family Sphingidae first described by Francis Walker in 1856.

== Species ==
- Cizara ardeniae (Lewin, 1805)
- Cizara sculpta (R. Felder, 1874)
