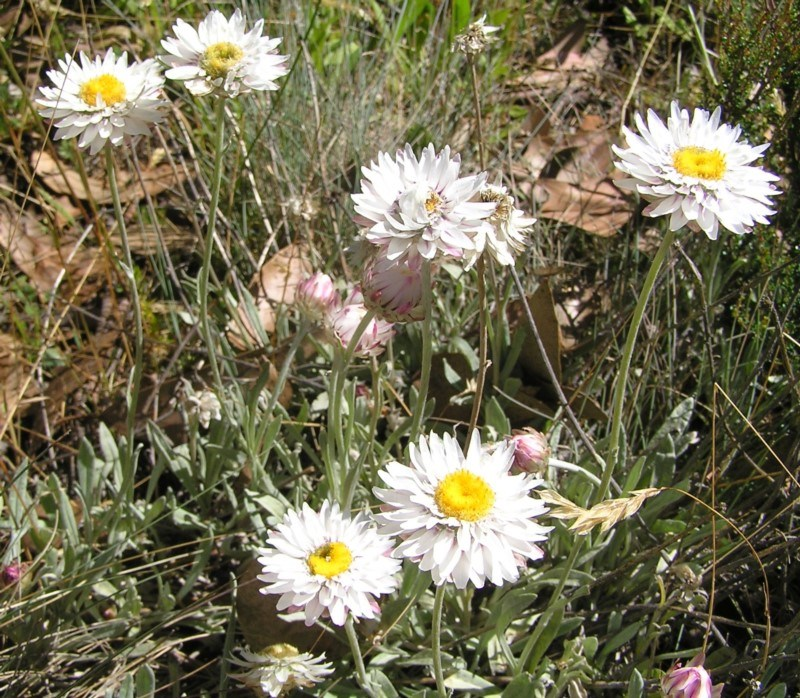

Scientific classification
- Kingdom: Plantae
- Clade: Tracheophytes
- Clade: Angiosperms
- Clade: Eudicots
- Clade: Asterids
- Order: Asterales
- Family: Asteraceae
- Genus: Leucochrysum
- Species: L. alpinum

Binomial name
- Leucochrysum alpinum (F.Muell.) R.J.Dennis & N.G.Walsh

= Leucochrysum alpinum =

Alpine sunray

Species of flowering plant

Leucochrysum alpinum, commonly known as alpine sunray, is a flowering plant in the family Asteraceae. It is a small, clumping perennial with grey leaves, white flower-heads and is endemic to Australia.

== Description ==
Leucochrysum alpinum is a perennial herb to about 50 cm (20 in) high and leaves that are woolly and whitish. The white flower heads are 2–5 cm (0.79–1.97 in) in diameter, outer involucral bracts oblong or oval-shaped, mostly purplish or brownish, sessile and florets yellow. Flowering occurs from December to February and the fruit is an egg-shaped achene 2–3 mm (0.079–0.118 in) long, smooth to almost warty, bristly and brown.

== Taxonomy ==
Leucochrysum alpinum was first described in 1859 by Ferdinand von Mueller who gave it the name Helipterum incanum var. alpinum. In 2010 R.J.Dennis & Neville Grant Walsh changed the name to Leucochrysum alpinum and the description was published in Muelleria.

== Distribution and habitat ==
Alpine sunray grows at higher altitudes and in subalpine heath and grasslands mostly on shallow soils in New South Wales and Victoria.
