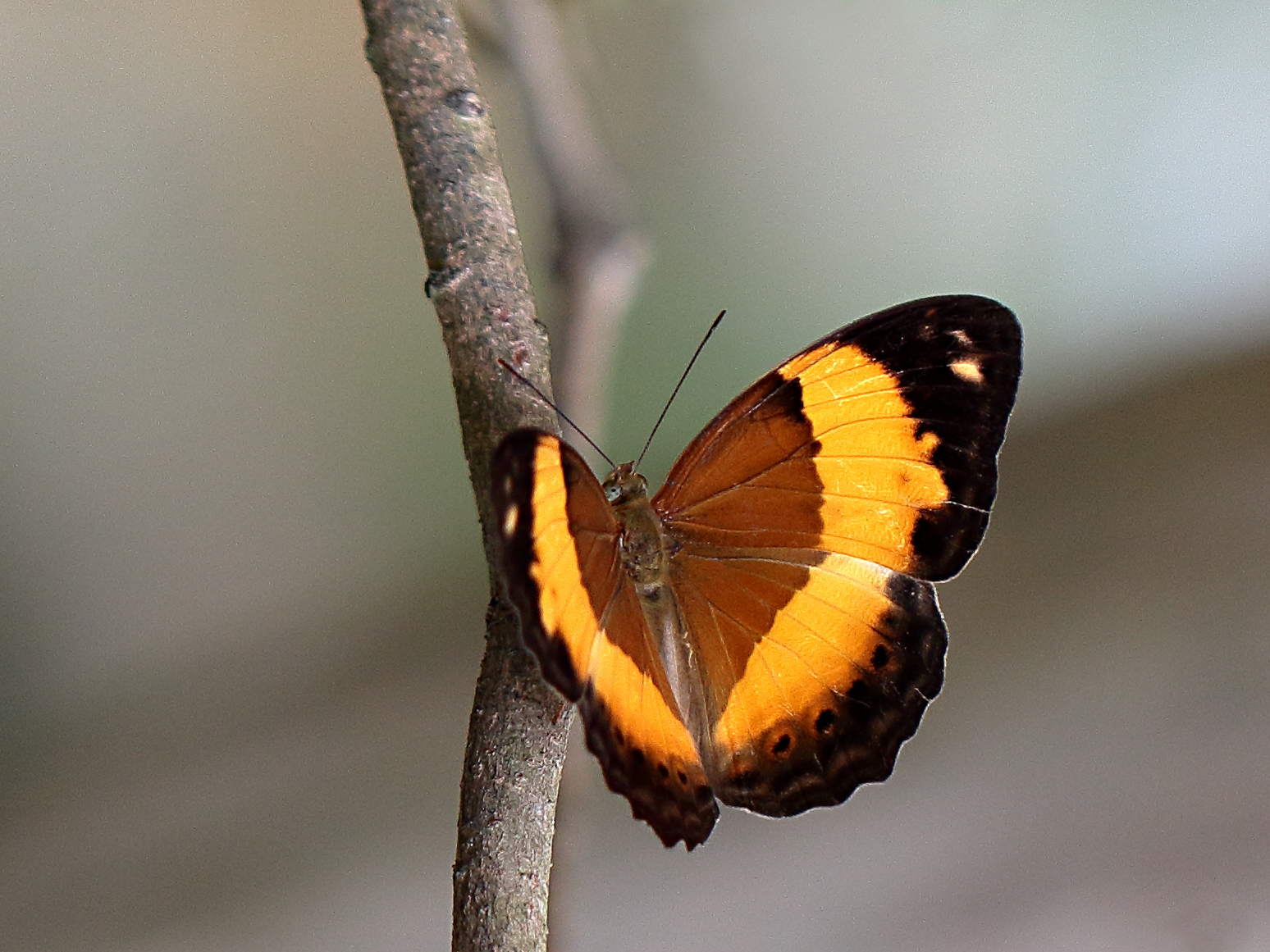

Scientific classification
- Kingdom: Animalia
- Phylum: Arthropoda
- Clade: Pancrustacea
- Class: Insecta
- Order: Lepidoptera
- Family: Nymphalidae
- Genus: Cupha
- Species: C. prosope

Binomial name
- Cupha prosope (Fabricius, 1775)

= Cupha prosope =

Species of butterfly

Cupha prosope, the bordered rustic, is a species of butterfly of the family Nymphalidae. It is found in New Guinea and adjacent islands and along the eastern coast of Queensland and Northern NSW.

== Habitat ==
Cupha prosope are often found in forest clearings and nearby to creeks.

=== Host plants ===
The larvae of Cupha prosope feed on the leaves of Scolopia braunii, Flacourtia jangomas, Xylosma ovatum, Xylosma terrae-reginae and Flacourtia indica.

== Taxonomy ==
Cupha prosope contains the following subspecies:

- Cupha prosope wallacei
