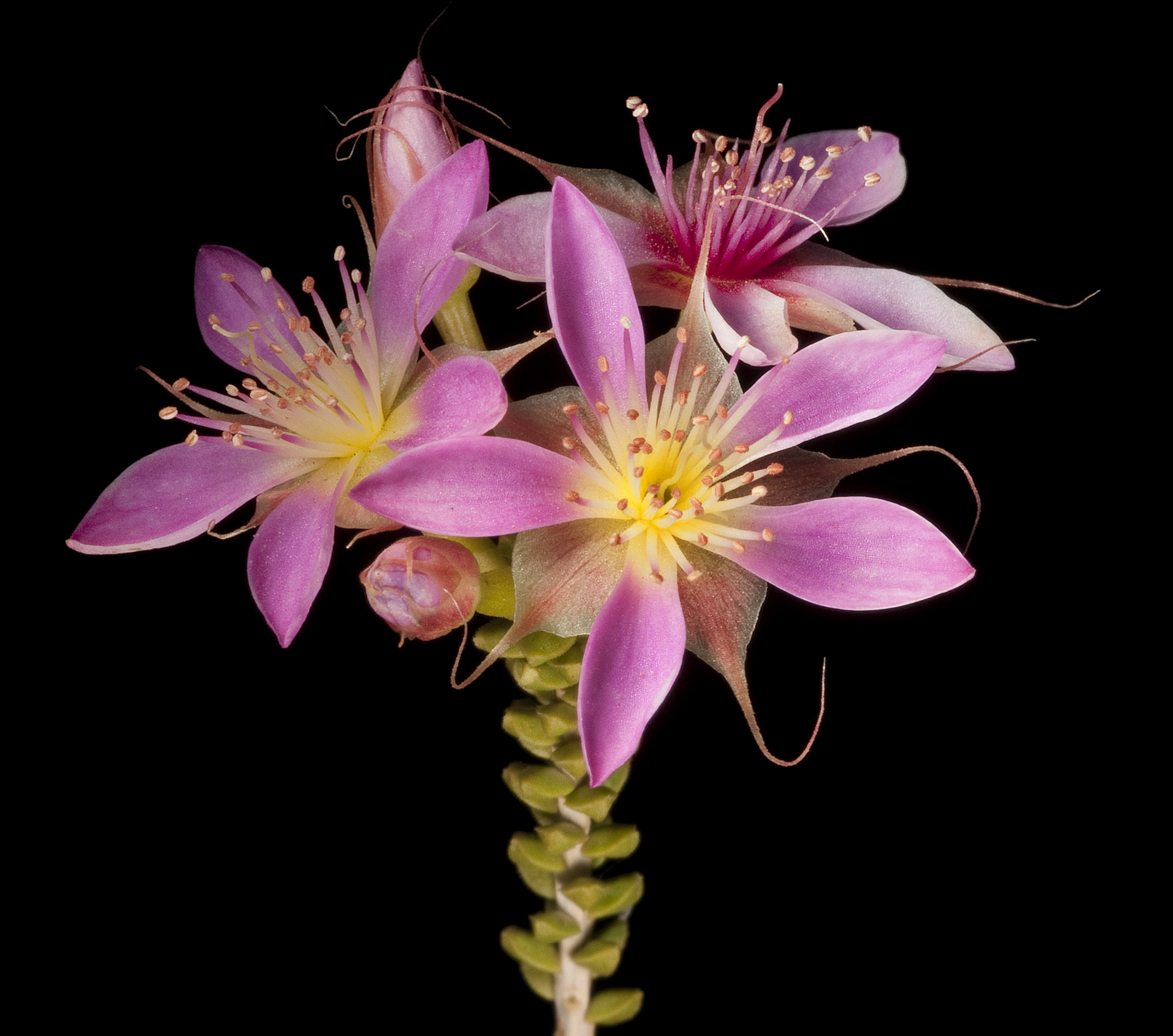

Scientific classification
- Kingdom: Plantae
- Clade: Tracheophytes
- Clade: Angiosperms
- Clade: Eudicots
- Clade: Rosids
- Order: Myrtales
- Family: Myrtaceae
- Genus: Calytrix
- Species: C. carinata

Binomial name
- Calytrix carinata Craven

Synonyms
- Calythrix microphylla var. ? longifolia Benth. orth. var.; Calytrix microphylla var. ? longifolia Benth.; Calytrix sp. D; Calytrix longiflora auct. non (F.Muell.) Benth.

= Calytrix carinata =

Species of flowering plant

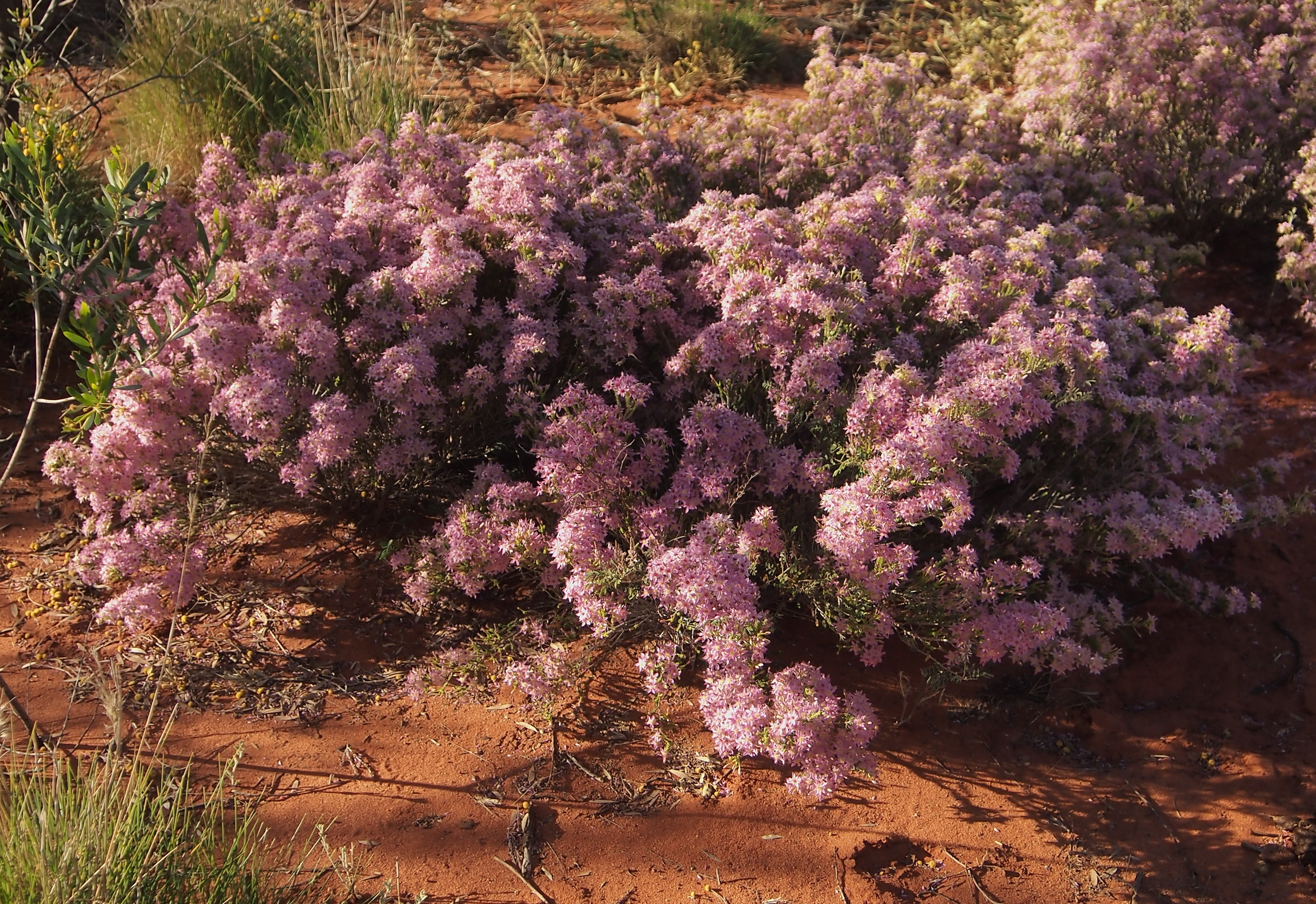
Habit

Calytrix carinata is a species of flowering plant in the myrtle family Myrtaceae and is endemic to northern Australia. It is a more or less glabrous shrub with egg-shaped, elliptic, linear or lanceolate leaves and clusters of pink, pinkish purple, or reddish flowers with about 30 to 50 pink and yellowish white stamens in two rows.

== Description ==
Calytrix carinata is a more or less glabrous shrub that typically grows to a height of up to 0.3–3 m (1 ft 0 in – 9 ft 10 in). Its leaves are egg-shaped, elliptic, linear or lanceolate, 1.5–4 mm (0.059–0.157 in) long, 0.8–1.5 mm (0.031–0.059 in) wide and sessile or on a petiole 0.8 mm (0.031 in) long. There are stipules up to 0.25 mm (0.0098 in) long at the base of the petioles. The floral tube is 9–16 mm (0.35–0.63 in) long and has 10 ribs. The sepals are joined for up to 0.5 mm (0.020 in) at the base, the lobes elliptic, egg-shaped or more or less round, 2.25–4.5 mm (0.089–0.177 in) long and wide with an awn up to 14 mm (0.55 in) long. The petals are pink, pinkish purple, or reddish with a white base, narrowly elliptic to lance-shaped, 5.75–11 mm (0.226–0.433 in) long and 2–6 mm (0.079–0.236 in) wide with about 30 to 50 pink stamens with a yellowish white base in 2 rows, becoming dark reddish as they age. Flowering occurs from March or May to October.

== Taxonomy ==
Calytrix carinata was first formally described in 1987 by Lyndley Craven in the journal Brunonia from specimens collected 160 km (99 mi) west of Uluru in 1969. The specific epithet (carinata) means 'keeled', referring to the bracteoles.

== Distribution and habitat ==
This species of Calytrix grows on dunes, flats and or rocky hillsides in the Central Ranges, Dampierland, Gascoyne, Gibson Desert, Great Sandy Desert, Great Victoria Desert, Little Sandy Desert, Murchison, Ord Victoria Plain, Pilbara and Tanami regions of Western Australia, the southern part of the Northern Territory, northern South Australia and the Simpson Desert region of south-west Queenslandand where it grows on red sand and gravelly laterite on dunes, flats and rocky hillsides.
