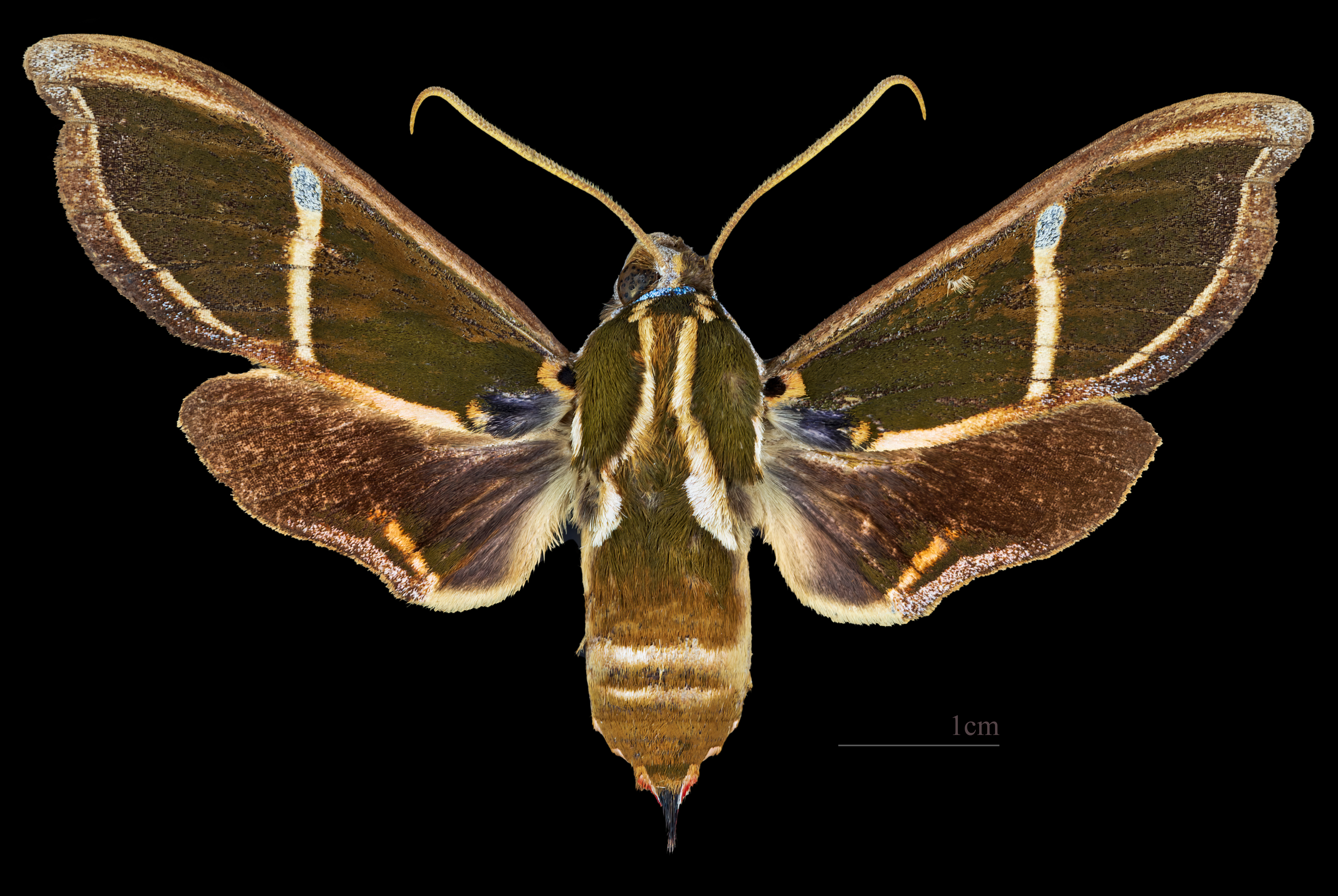
- Cizara ardeniae ♂
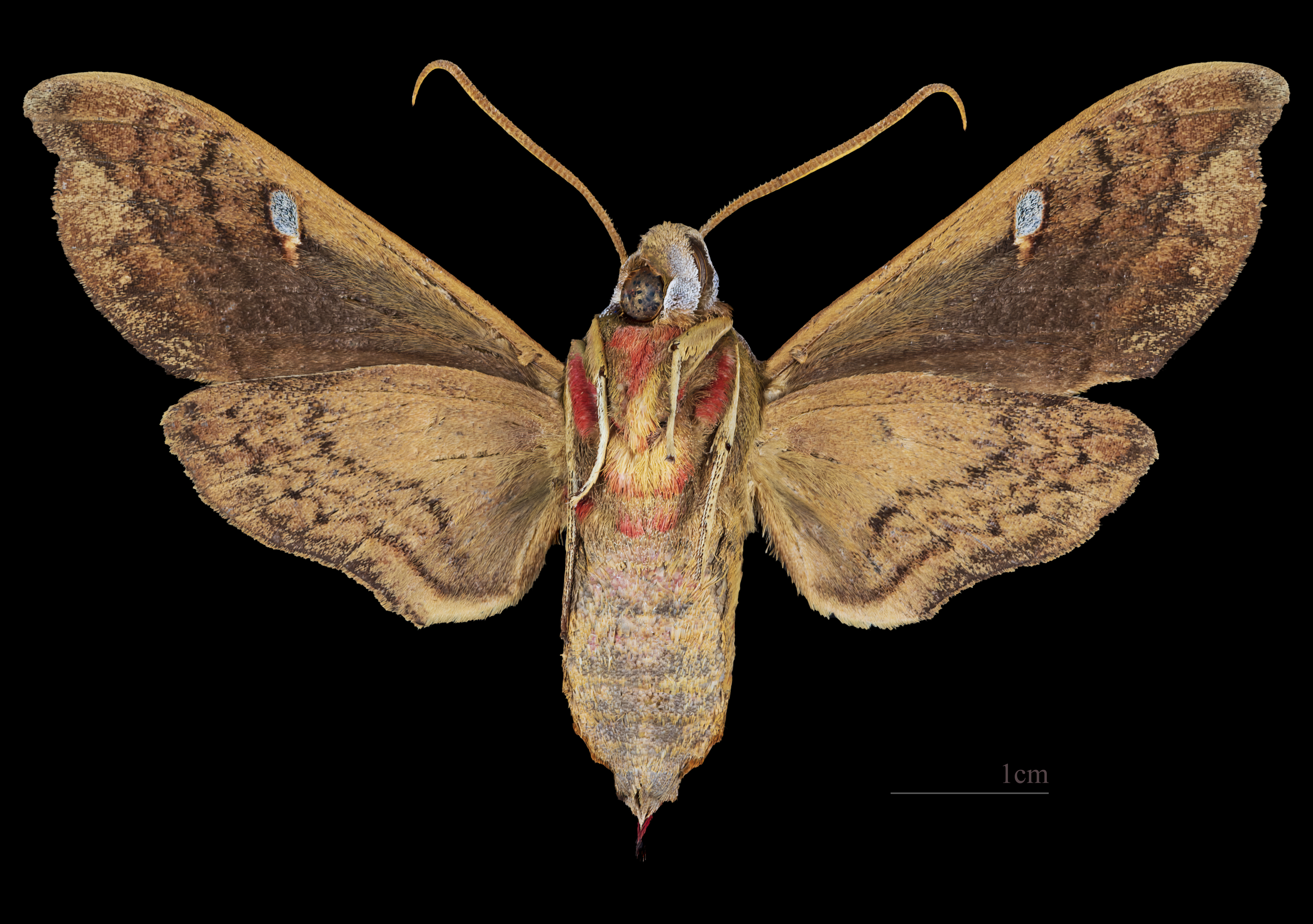
- Cizara ardeniae ♂ △

Scientific classification
- Kingdom: Animalia
- Phylum: Arthropoda
- Class: Insecta
- Order: Lepidoptera
- Family: Sphingidae
- Genus: Cizara
- Species: C. ardeniae

Binomial name
- Cizara ardeniae (Lewin, 1805)

Synonyms
- Sphinx ardeniae Lewin, 1805

= Cizara ardeniae =

Coprosma hawk moth

Species of moth

Cizara ardeniae, the coprosma hawk moth, is a moth of the family Sphingidae. The species was first described by John Lewin in 1805.

== Distribution ==
It is known from the eastern coastal region of Australia and New Zealand.

== Description ==
The wingspan is about 60 mm.

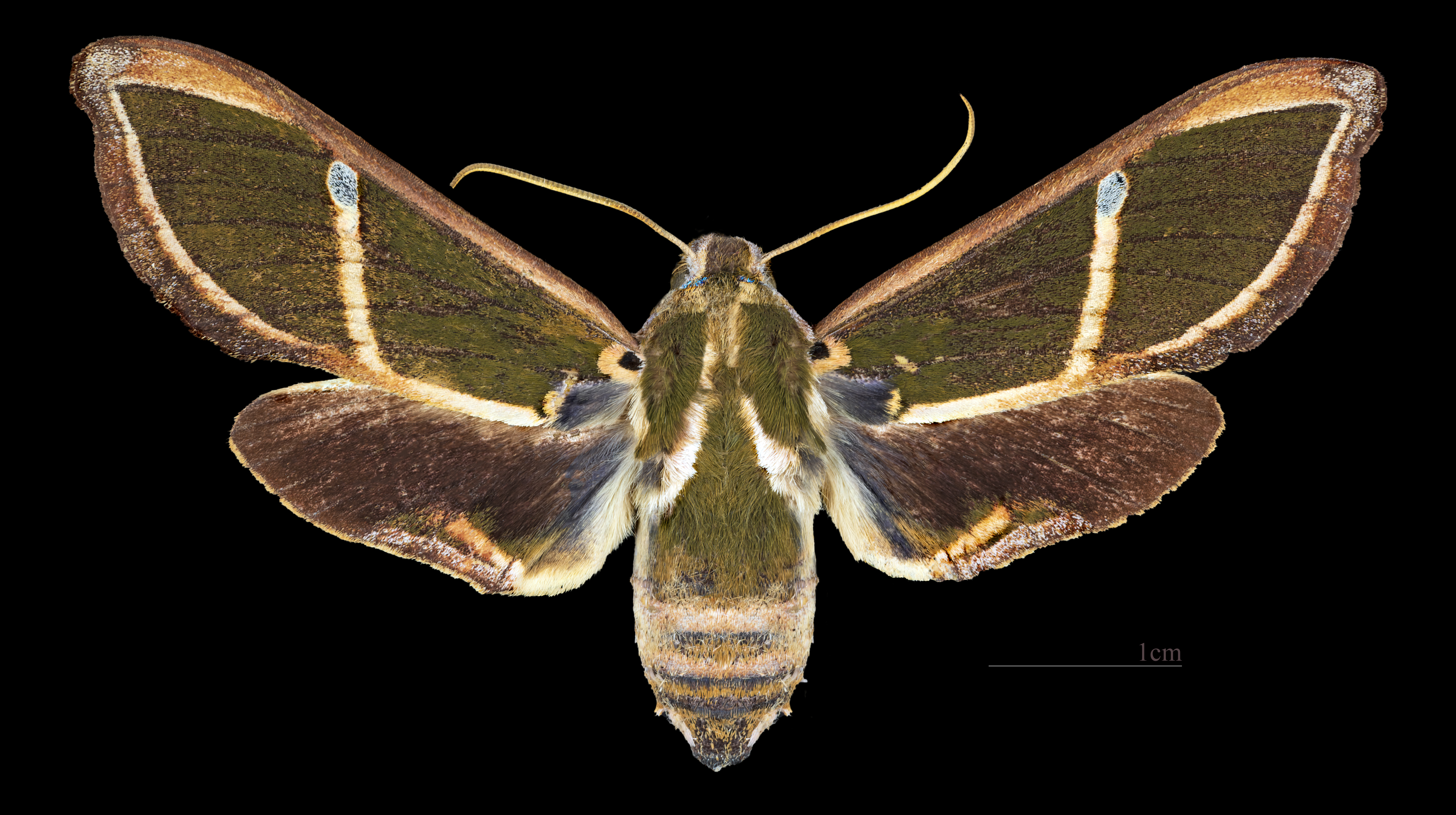
Cizara ardeniae ♀

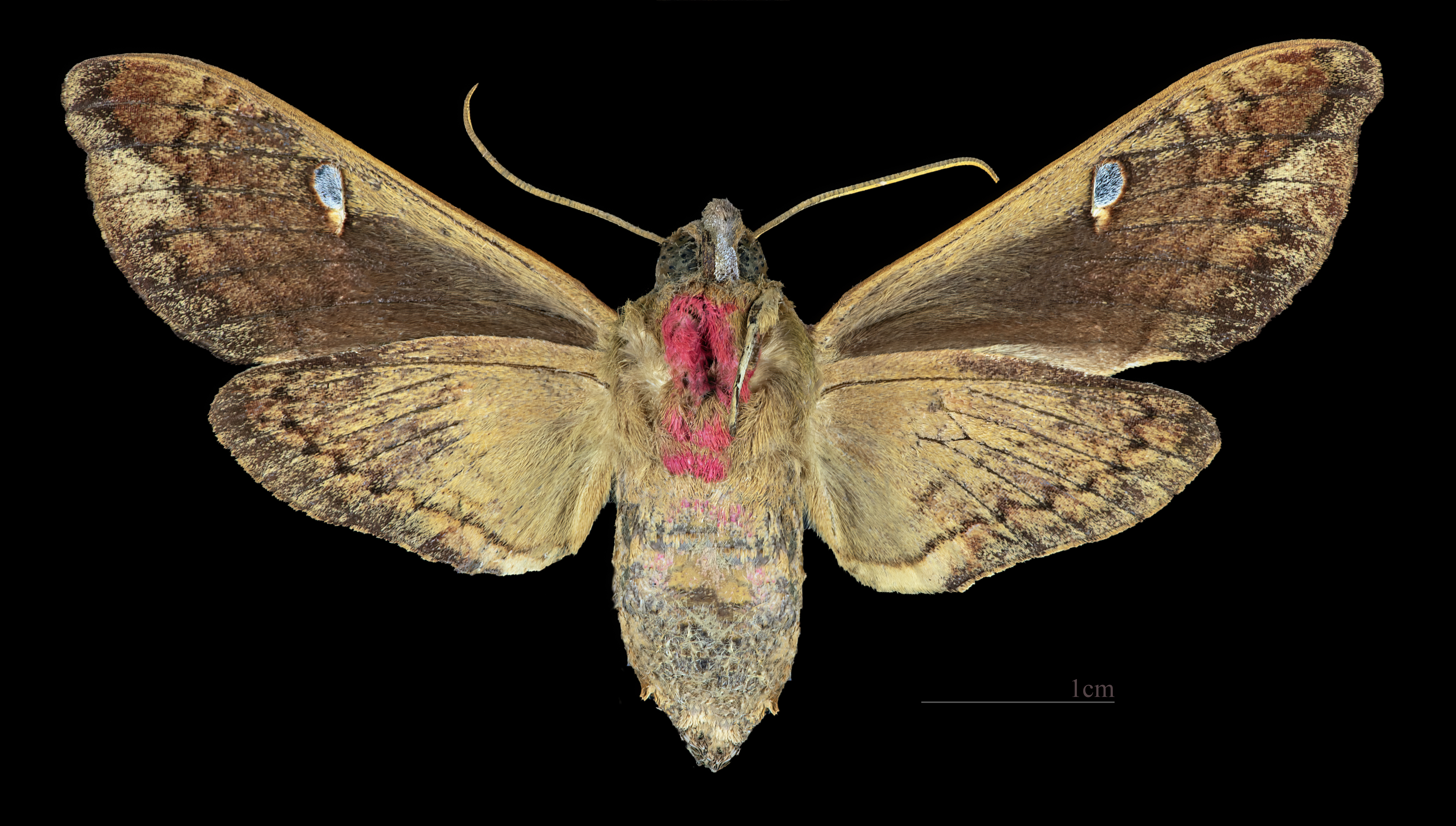
Cizara ardeniae ♀ △

== Biology ==
The larvae have been recorded feeding on various Rubiaceae species, including Coprosma repens, Coprosma quadrifida, Coprosma lucida and Myrmecodia beccarii.
