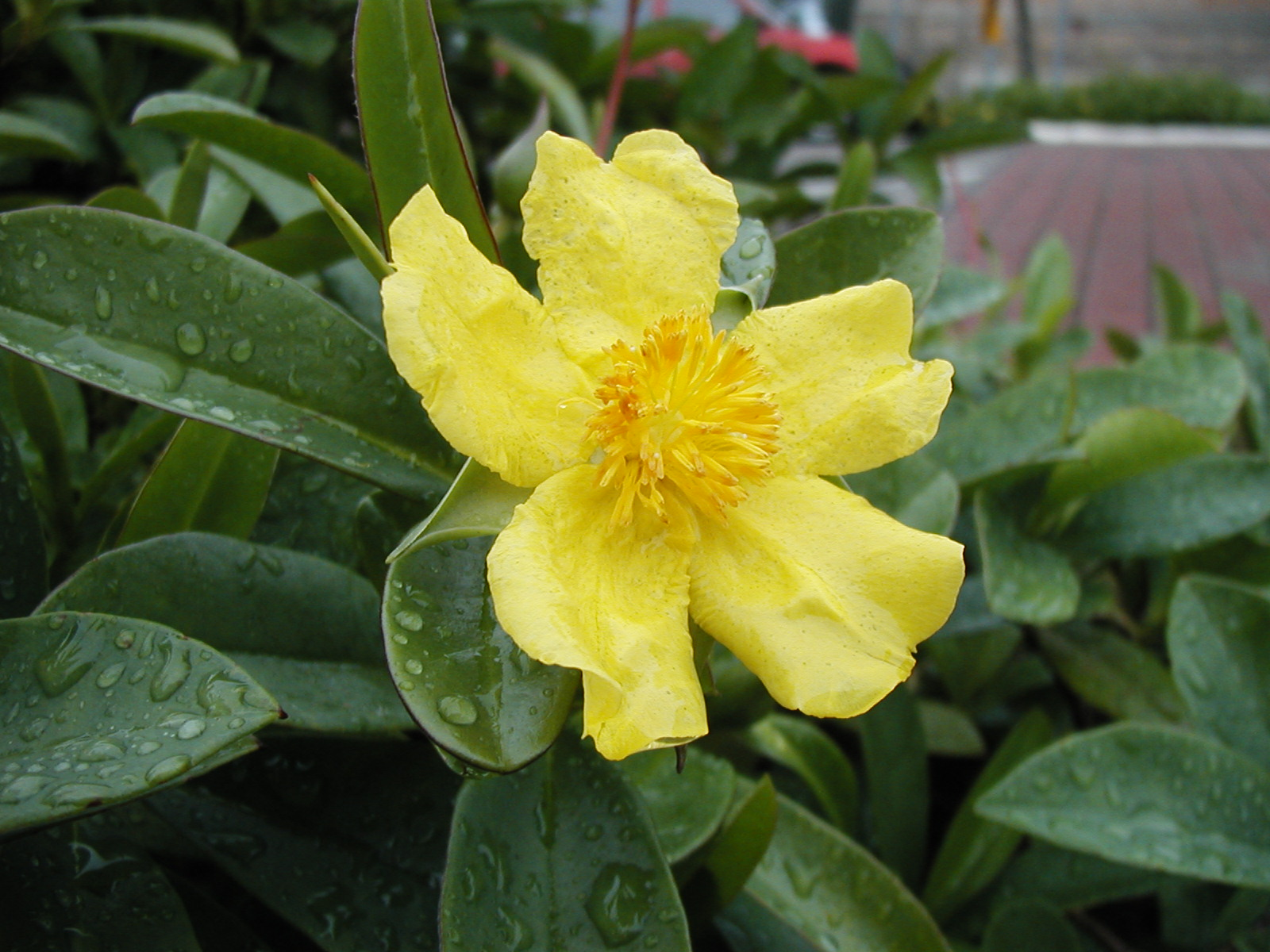
- Hibbertia scandens at Dulwich Hill

Scientific classification
- Kingdom: Plantae
- Clade: Tracheophytes
- Clade: Angiosperms
- Clade: Eudicots
- Order: Dilleniales
- Family: Dilleniaceae
- Genus: Hibbertia
- Species: H. scandens

Binomial name
- Hibbertia scandens (Willd.) Dryand.
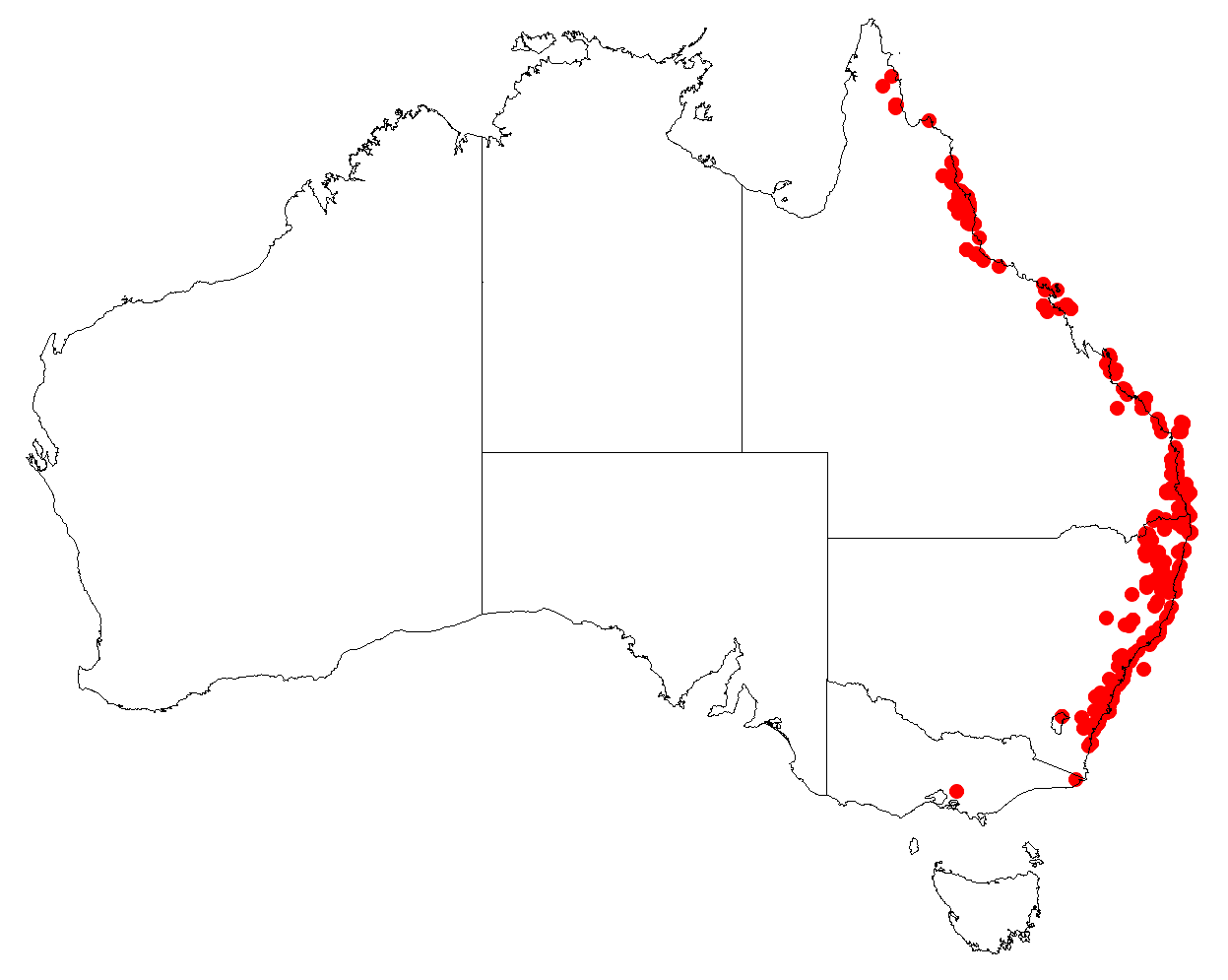
- Collection data from the AVH

Synonyms
- List: Dillenia scandens Willd.; ? Dillenia speciosa Curtis; Dillenia terneraeflora Ker Gawl. orth. var.; Dillenia terneriflora Ker Gawl. nom. illeg.; Dillenia turneraeflora Dryand. orth. var.; Dillenia volubilis (Andrews) Vent.; Dillenia volubilis (Andrews) Pers. isonym; Hibbertia volubilis Andrews

= Hibbertia scandens =

Snake vine

Species of vine

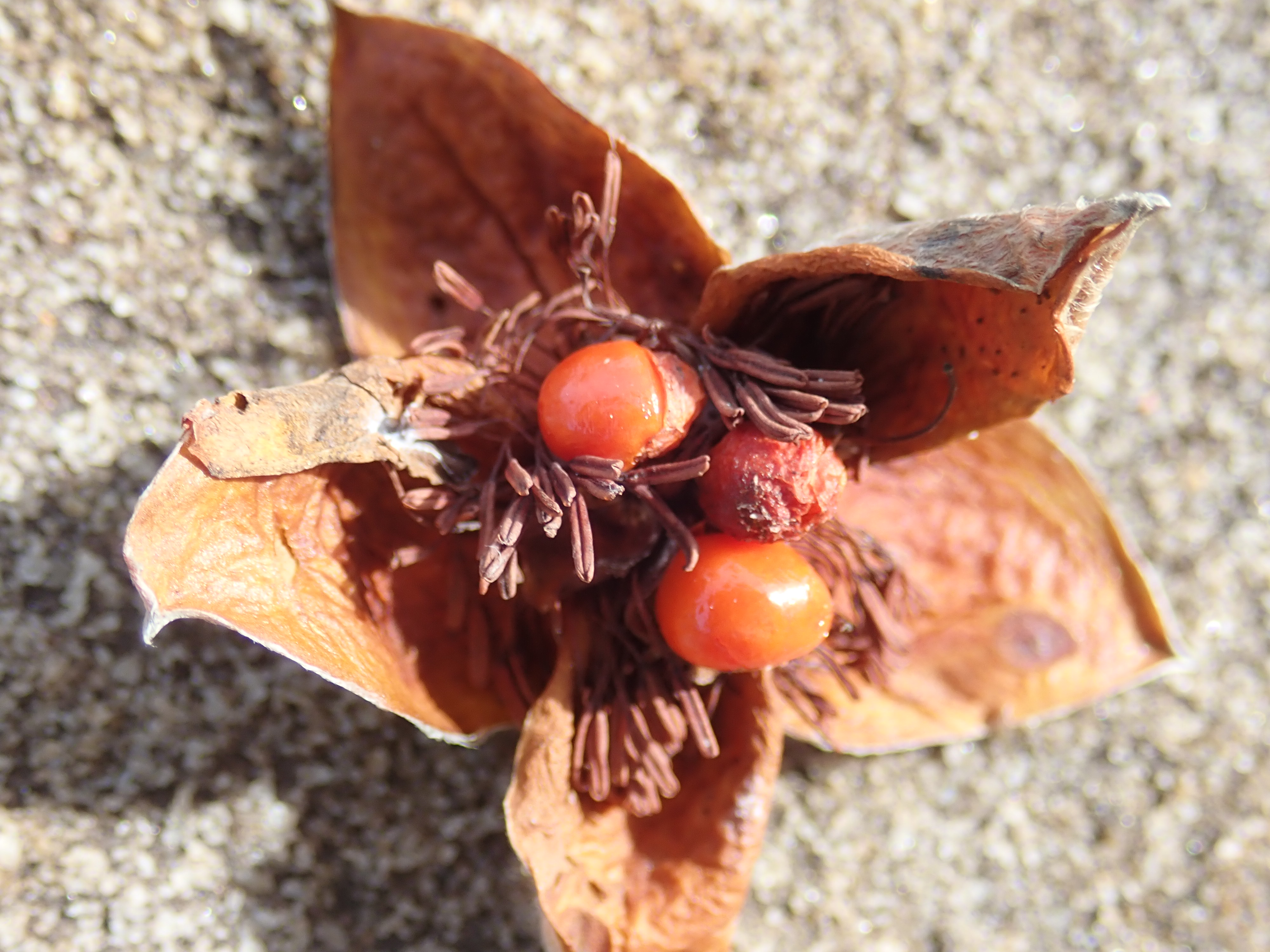
Aril and flower remnants at Palm Beach

Hibbertia scandens, sometimes known by the common names snake vine, climbing guinea flower and golden guinea vine, is a species of flowering plant in the family Dilleniaceae and is endemic to eastern Australia. It is climber or scrambler with lance-shaped or egg-shaped leaves with the narrower end towards the base, and yellow flowers with more than thirty stamens arranged around between three and seven glabrous carpels.

== Description ==
Hibbertia scandens is a climber or scrambler with stems 2–5 m (6 ft 7 in – 16 ft 5 in) long. The leaves are lance-shaped or egg-shaped with the narrower end towards the base, 30–80 mm (1.2–3.1 in) long and 15–25 mm (0.59–0.98 in) wide, sessile and often stem-clasping with the lower surface silky-hairy. The flowers are arranged in leaf axils, each flower on a peduncle 2–4 mm (0.079–0.157 in) long. The sepals are 15–25 mm (0.59–0.98 in) long and the petals are yellow, 20–30 mm (0.79–1.18 in) long with more than thirty stamens surrounding the three to seven glabrous carpels. Flowering occurs in most months and the fruit is an orange aril.

Plants near the coast tend to be densely hairy with spatula-shaped leaves and have flowers with six or seven carpels, whilst those further inland are usually more or less glabrous with tapering leaves and flowers with three or four carpels.

The flowers have been reported as having an unpleasant odour variously described as similar to mothballs or animal urine or sweet but with "a pronounced faecal element".

== Taxonomy ==
Snake vine was first formally described in 1799 by German botanist Carl Willdenow who gave it the name Dillenia scandens in Species Plantarum. In 1805, Swedish botanist Jonas Dryander transferred the species into the genus Hibbertia as H. scandens in the Annals of Botany. The specific epithet (scandens) is derived from Latin, and means "climbing".

Three varieties of H. scandens have been described and the names are accepted by the Australian Plant Census but not by the National Herbarium of New South Wales:

- Hibbertia scandens var. glabra (Maiden) C.T.White;
- Hibbertia scandens var. oxyphylla Domin;
- Hibbertia scandens (Willd.) Dryand. var. scandens.

== Distribution and habitat ==
Hibbertia scandens grows on coastal sand dunes, in open forest and at rainforest margins in an area extending from Proserpine in north-eastern Queensland to the far south coast of New South Wales. The species also occurs as an uncommon weed in Auckland, New Zealand.

== Ecology ==
Some pollination surveys place beetles (from the Scarabaeidae, Chrysomelidae and Curculionidae) as the main pollinators of Hibbertia scandens, as well as Hibbertia hypericoides (DC.) Benth., and other species from the Dilleniaceae family, they also place bees and flies as secondary importance (such as Keighery 1975).

== Use in horticulture ==
This species is common in cultivation and adapts to a wide range of growing conditions, including where it is exposed to salt-laden winds. Although it readily grows in semi-shaded areas, it flowers best in full sun and prefers well-drained soil. As it is only hardy down to 5 °C (41 °F) it requires winter protection in temperate regions. In the United Kingdom it has gained the Royal Horticultural Society's Award of Garden Merit.

== In popular culture ==
Hibbertia scandens appeared on an Australian postage stamp in 1999.

== See also ==
- List of flora on stamps of Australia
