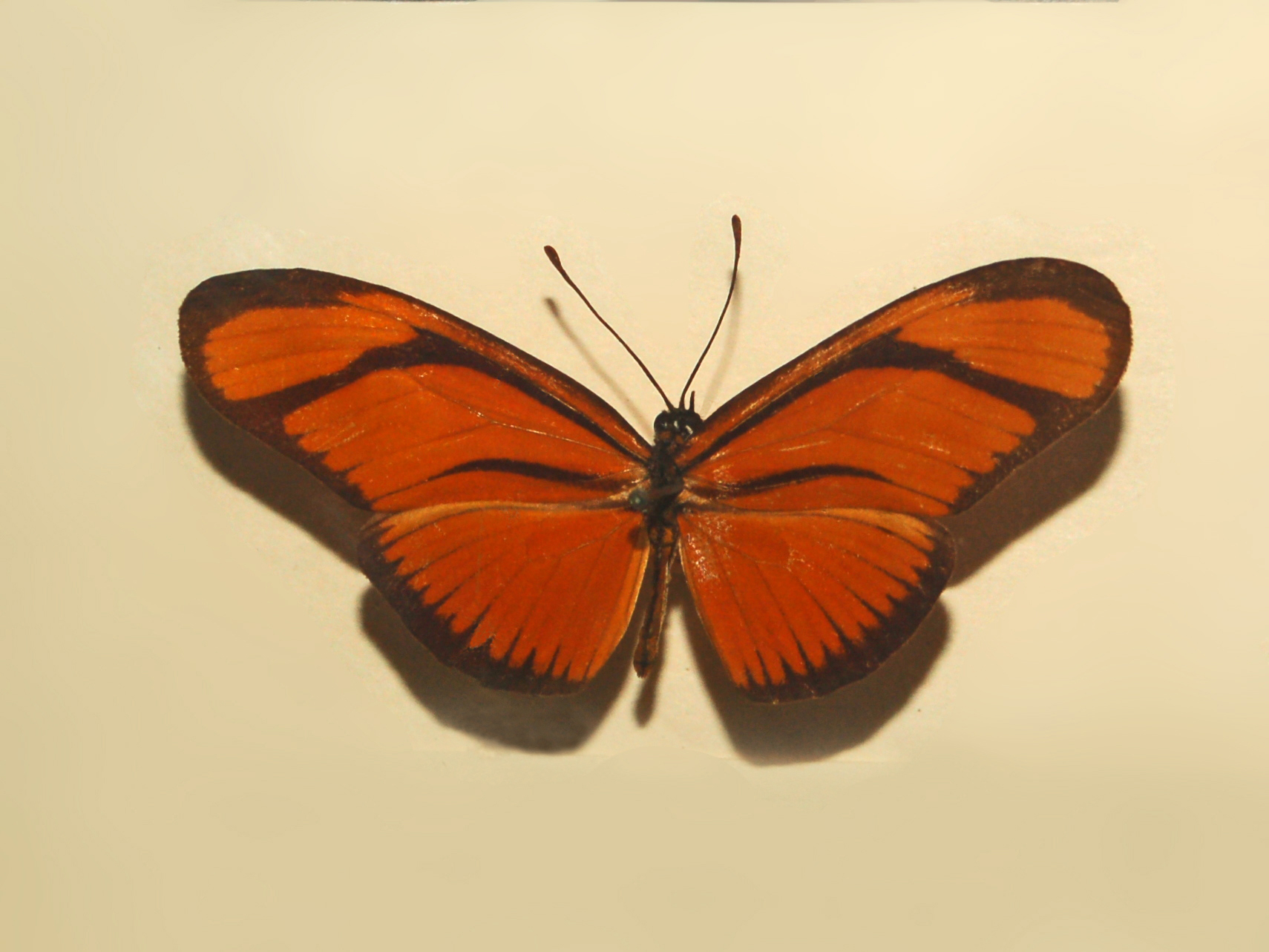
- Specimen from Brazil

Scientific classification
- Kingdom: Animalia
- Phylum: Arthropoda
- Class: Insecta
- Order: Lepidoptera
- Family: Nymphalidae
- Genus: Eueides
- Species: E. aliphera

Binomial name
- Eueides aliphera (Godart, 1819)

Synonyms
- Cethosia aliphera Godart, 1819; Eueides aliphera; Colaenis aliphera Hübner, 1826]; Heliconius (Eueides) alipherus Brown & Mielke, 1967; Heliconius aliphera; Eueides cyllenula Seitz, 1924

= Eueides aliphera =

Juliette

Species of butterfly

Eueides aliphera, the Juliette, is a species of nymphalid butterfly, belonging to Heliconiinae subfamily found in the Neotropical ecozone.

== Description ==
Eueides aliphera has a wingspan reaching about 55 millimetres (2.2 in). The wings are narrower than in all other species of the genus and the apex of primaries is more straight instead of rounded. The basic colour of the wings is fulvous. The uppersides of the forewings have a narrow black bar and black margins, while the uppersides of the hindwings have fine black veins. The underside is similar to the upperside.

Larvae feed on Passiflora oerstedi, Passiflora vitifolia, and Passiflora auriculata.

== Distribution ==
This species can be found in Central and Southern America, from Mexico, Honduras, and Costa Rica to Brazil.

== Habitat ==
Eueides aliphera occurs in scrubby forests and in forest clearings from sea level to an elevation of about 1,600 metres (5,200 ft).

== Subspecies ==
- Eueides aliphera aliphera (Brazil)
- Eueides aliphera cyllenella Seitz, 1912 (Brazil)
- Eueides aliphera gracilis Stichel, 1903 (Honduras, Costa Rica)
