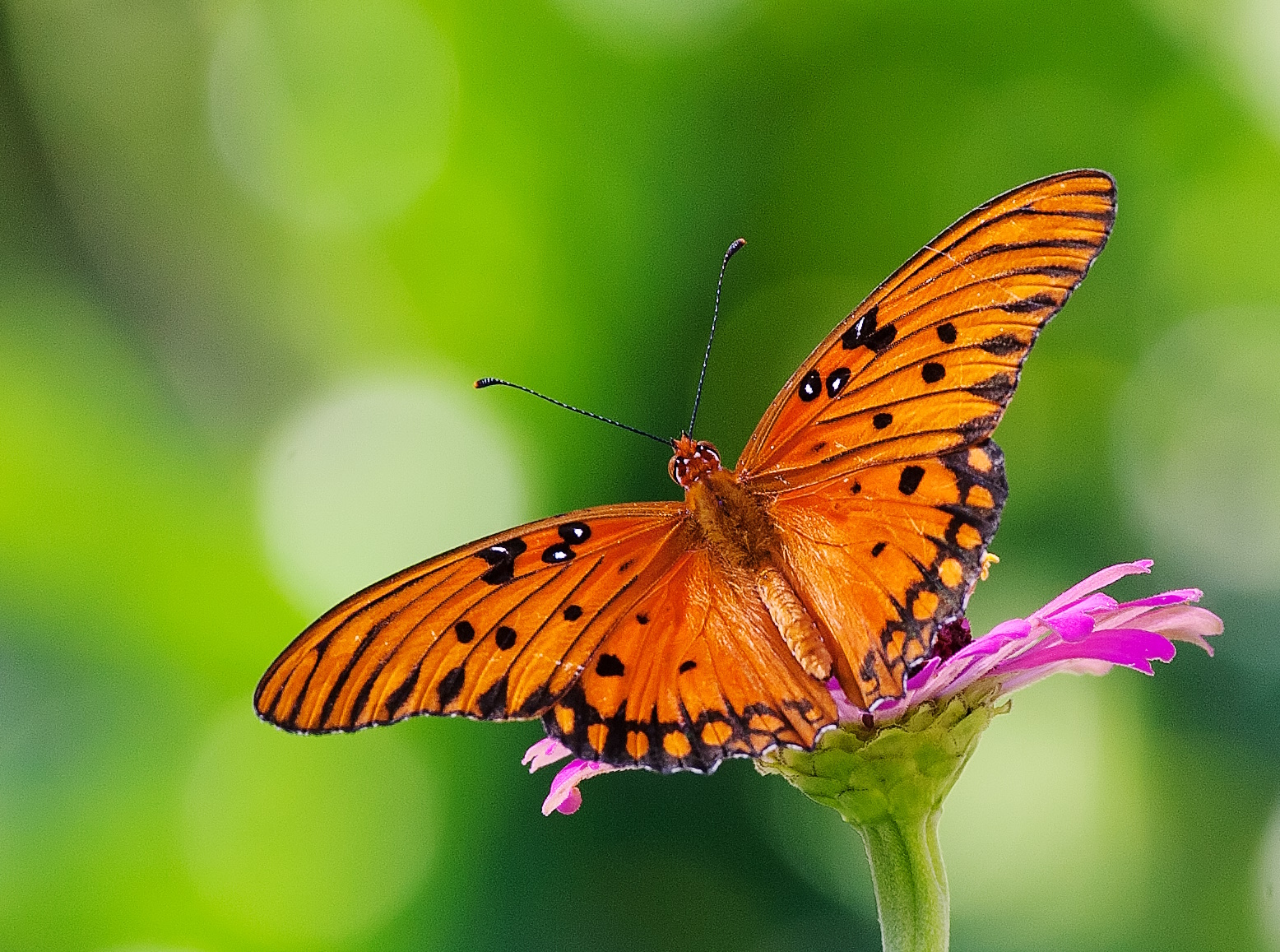
- Gulf fritillary (Agraulis vanillae)

Scientific classification
- Domain: Eukaryota
- Kingdom: Animalia
- Phylum: Arthropoda
- Class: Insecta
- Order: Lepidoptera
- Family: Nymphalidae
- Subfamily: Heliconiinae
- Tribe: Heliconiini; Swainson, 1822

Genera
- See text

= Heliconiini =

Tribe of butterflies

Heliconiini is a tribe of butterflies in the subfamily Heliconiinae, also known as the passion-vine butterflies. This group has roughly 100 species and subspecies distributed primarily in the Neotropics.

== Genera and select species ==
- Agraulis (Boisduval & Le Conte, 1833) monotypic
  - Agraulis vanillae (Linnaeus, 1758) – Gulf fritillary
- Dione (Hübner, 1819)
  - Dione juno (Cramer, 1779) – Juno silverspot, Juno longwing
- Dryadula (Michener, 1942) monotypic
  - Dryadula phaetusa (Linnaeus, 1758) – banded orange, orange tiger
- Dryas (Hübner, 1807) monotypic
  - Dryas iulia (Hübner, 1807) – Julia longwing
- Eueides (Hübner, 1816) – longwings
- Heliconius (Kluk, 1802) – longwings or heliconians
- Philaethria (Billberg, 1820)
- Podotricha (Michener, 1942)

Two additional genera, Laparus Billberg, 1820 and Neruda Turner, 1976, have recently been synonymized with Heliconius.

== See also ==
- List of fritillaries (butterflies)
