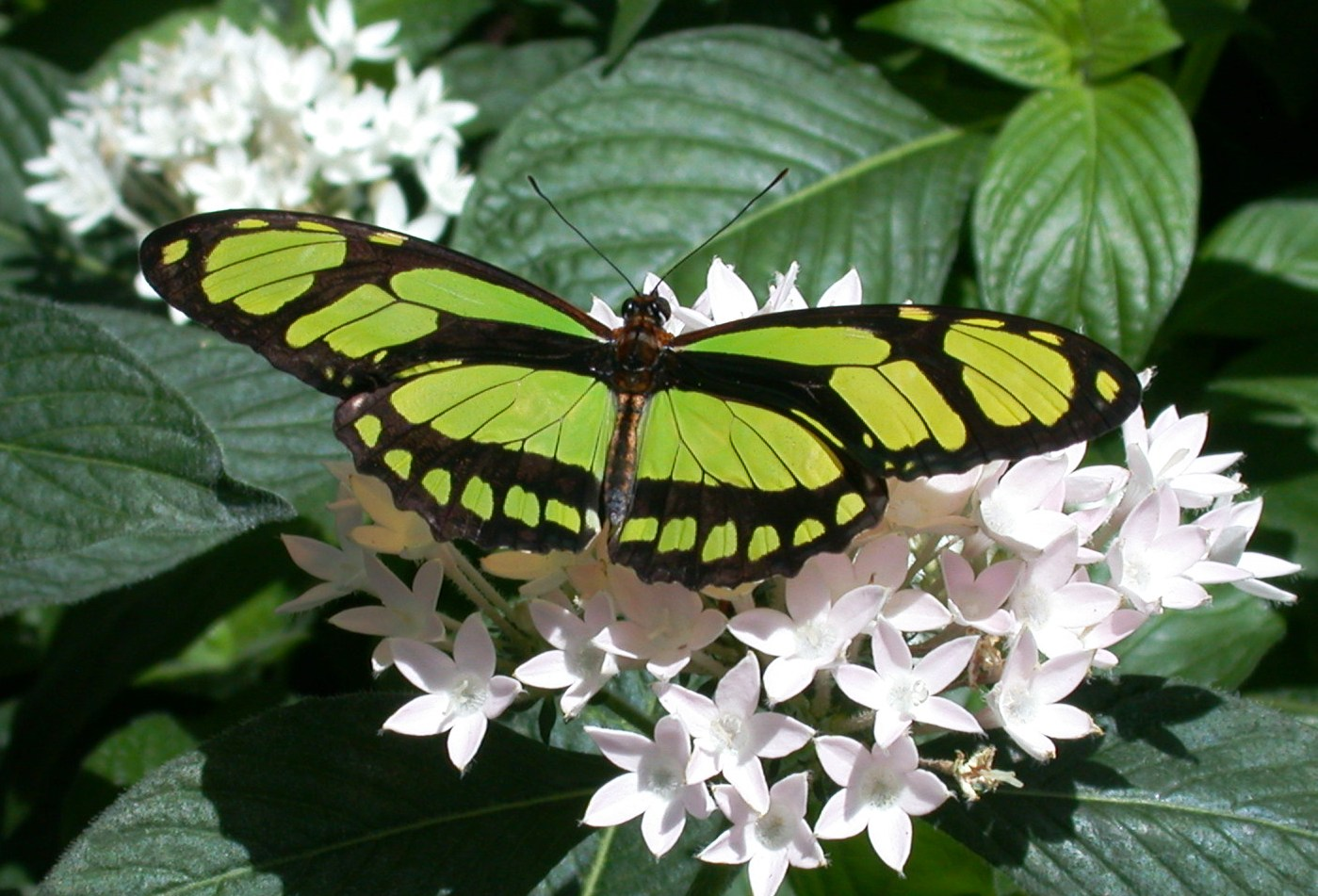

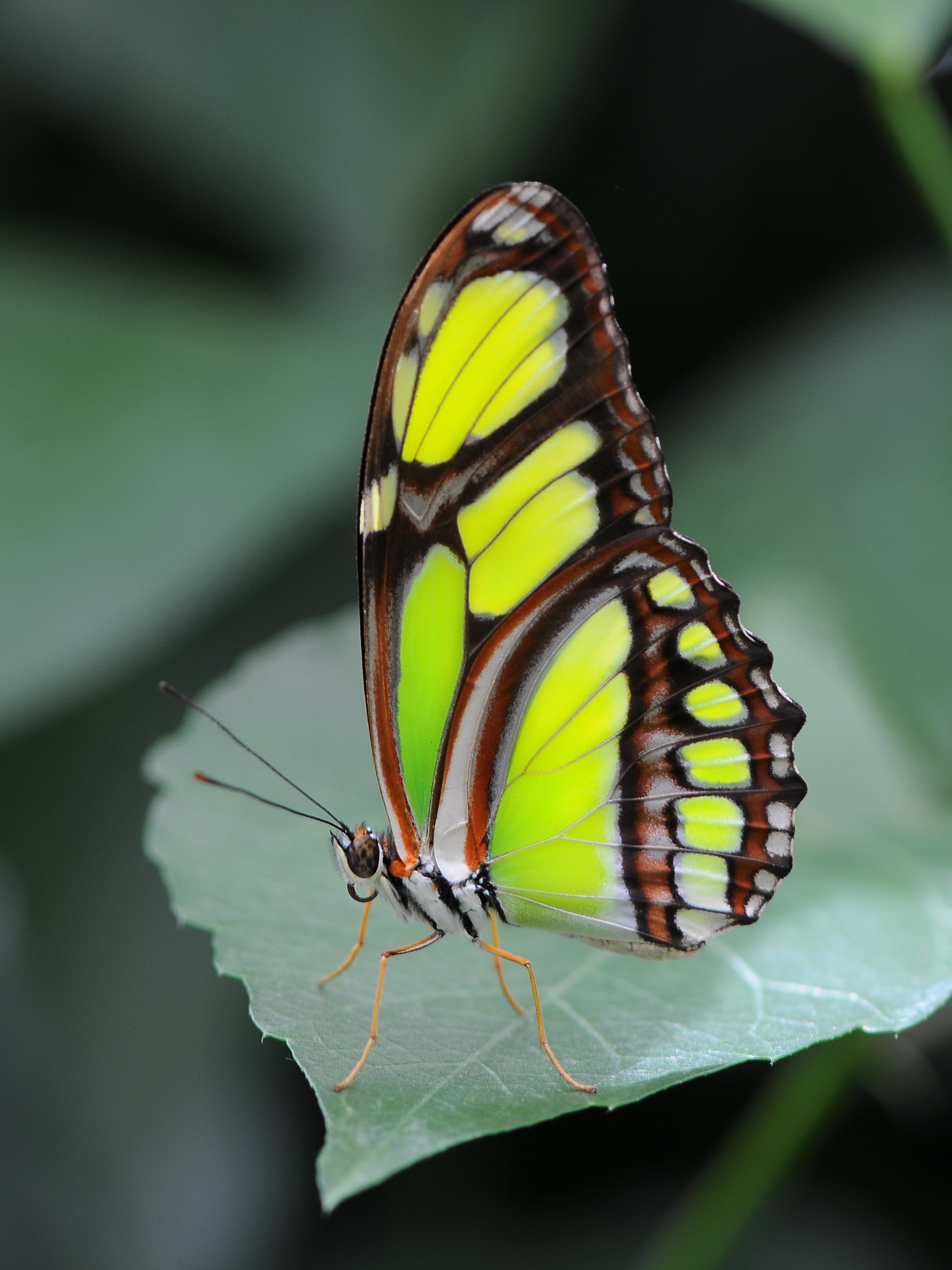

Scientific classification
- Kingdom: Animalia
- Phylum: Arthropoda
- Clade: Pancrustacea
- Class: Insecta
- Order: Lepidoptera
- Family: Nymphalidae
- Genus: Philaethria
- Species: P. dido

Binomial name
- Philaethria dido (Linnaeus, 1763)

Synonyms
- Papilio dido; Metamorpha dido

= Philaethria dido =

Species of butterfly

Philaethria dido, the scarce bamboo page or dido longwing, is a butterfly in the family Nymphalidae. It is found in Central America and tropical South America, both east and west of the Andes, from Brazil and Ecuador northwards to Mexico. Strays can sometimes be found in the lower Rio Grande Valley in southern Texas.

== Description ==
The butterflies have a wingspan of about 110 mm (4.3 in), and in Mexico are on the wing from July to December. The upper surface of the wings is black patterned with translucent green patches. The underside is similar with some brown streaks with gray scales. Philaethria dido is often confused with Siproeta stelenes. They have a similar coloration, but their wing shapes are different and whereas P. dido flies high in the canopy, S. stelenes is often to be seen in forest clearings and open secondary forest.

== Subspecies ==
Three subspecies are recognized. Philaethria dido chocoensis is found only on the western side of the Andes, its range extending from Ecuador to the Chocó region in northwestern Colombia. Philaethria dido dido inhabits tropical rainforests of South America east of the Andes, from Colombia to Bolivia. Philaethria dido panamensis lives only in Panama, from San Blas to Chiriquí

== Distribution and habitat ==
Philaethria dido chocoensis is endemic to land west of the Andes, its range extending from the western parts of Ecuador to the Chocó region in northwestern Colombia. Philaethria dido dido has a more widespread distribution and is native to tropical forests in South America to the east of the Andes. Its range extends from Brazil to Bolivia and Colombia and northward to Mexico. Stray butterflies have occasionally been observed in the lower part of the valley of the Rio Grande in Texas. This butterfly's flight is fast and direct and it mainly flits through the canopy and along the courses of streams, but it may also be seen in clearings and sunlit glades. It is present in tropical rainforests at altitudes from zero up to 1200 metres (4000 ft) but it is absent from deciduous forests.

== Biology ==
Philaethria dido feeds on nectar that it obtains from the flowers of forest trees such as Cissus. The males normally fly high in the canopy but sometimes descend to sunlit stream sides or gravel beaches besides rivers to sip mineral-rich water. Females often fly at about 4 m (13 ft) off the ground, dipping down at intervals to inspect potential egg-laying sites on species of passion flower. The eggs are laid on the under sides of the leaves on species including Passiflora laurifolia, P. vitifolia, P. edulis, and P. ambigua. The larvae are light green with a covering of reddish spines. The pupa is brown blotched with grey, has a rough warty surface and resembles a bird dropping.
