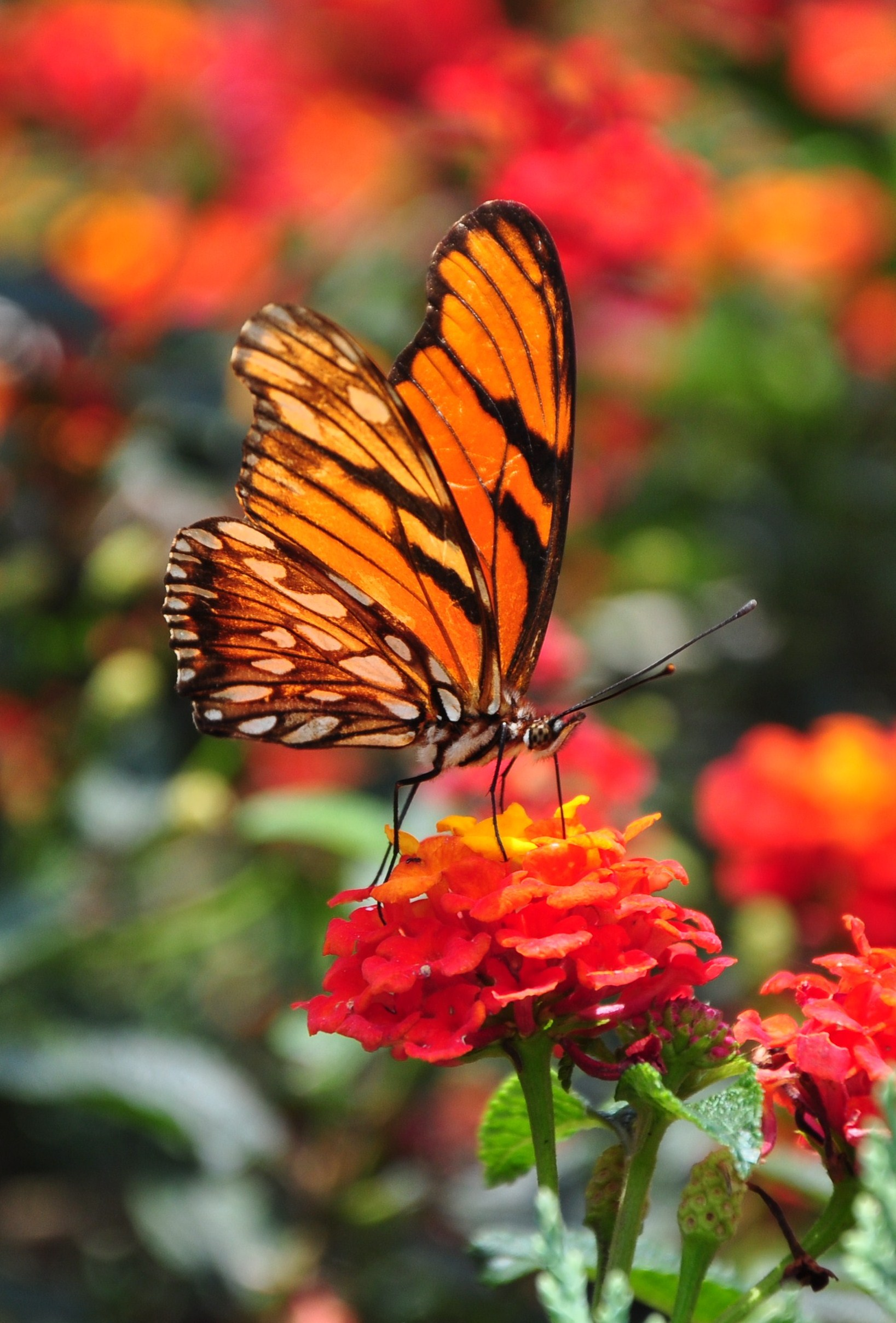
- Dione juno

Scientific classification
- Kingdom: Animalia
- Phylum: Arthropoda
- Class: Insecta
- Order: Lepidoptera
- Family: Nymphalidae
- Tribe: Heliconiini
- Genus: Dione; Hübner, [1819]

Type species
- Dione juno

Species
- See text

= Dione (butterfly) =

Genus of brush-footed butterflies

Dione is a genus of butterflies of the subfamily Heliconiinae in the family Nymphalidae found from southern United States to South America.

== Species ==
Listed alphabetically:

Eggs	Caterpillar	Chrysalis	Butterfly	Scientific name	Common name	Distribution
				Dione moneta Hübner, [1825]	Mexican silverspot	southern United States to South America
				Dione glycera (C. & R. Felder, 1861)	Andean silverspot	Peru, Venezuela and Colombia.
				Dione juno (Cramer, [1779])	Juno silverspot, Juno longwing, Juno heliconian	southern United States to South America
				Dione vanillae (Zhang, et al., [2019])	Gulf fritillary	southern parts of the U.S., such as many regions of Texas and Florida.
