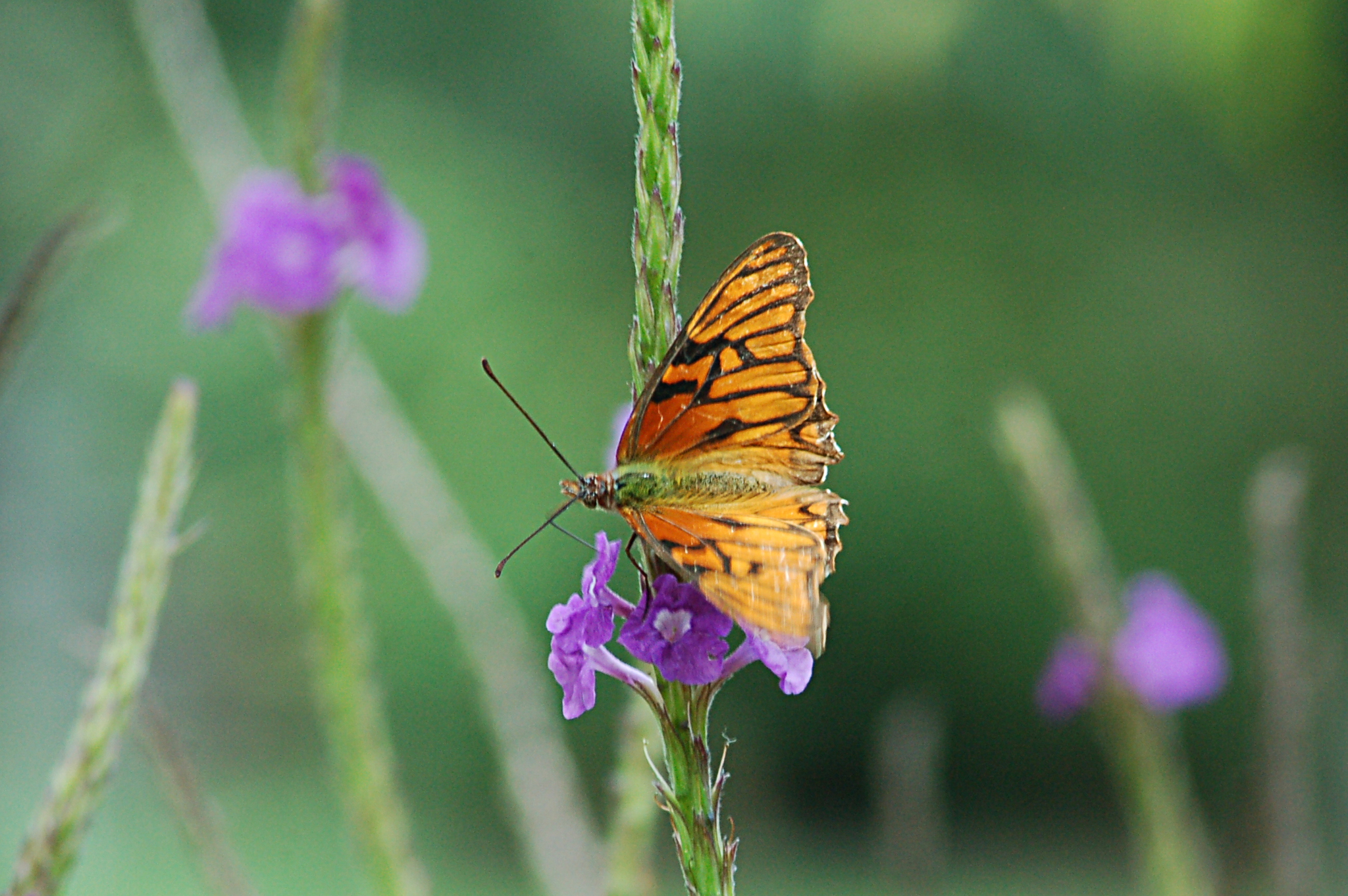
- Upperside
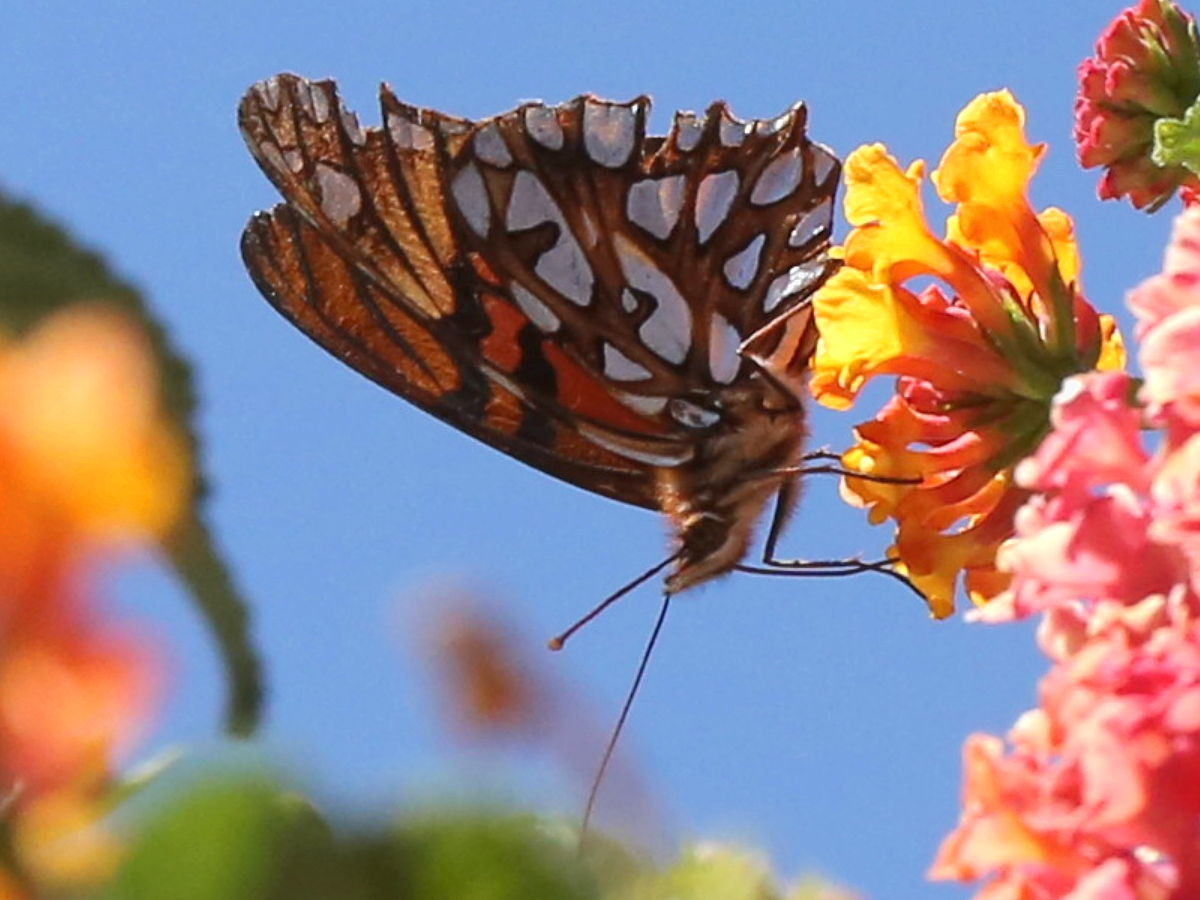
- Underside Ollantaytambo, Peru

Scientific classification
- Kingdom: Animalia
- Phylum: Arthropoda
- Class: Insecta
- Order: Lepidoptera
- Family: Nymphalidae
- Genus: Dione
- Species: D. glycera

Binomial name
- Dione glycera (C. & R. Felder, 1861)

Synonyms
- Agraulis glycera C. & R. Felder, 1861; Agraulis glycera Ménétriés, 1857; Dione glycera gnophota Stichel, 1907

= Dione glycera =

Andean silverspot

Species of butterfly

Dione glycera, the Andean silverspot, is a species of butterfly of the subfamily Heliconiinae in the family Nymphalidae found in Peru, Venezuela and Colombia.
