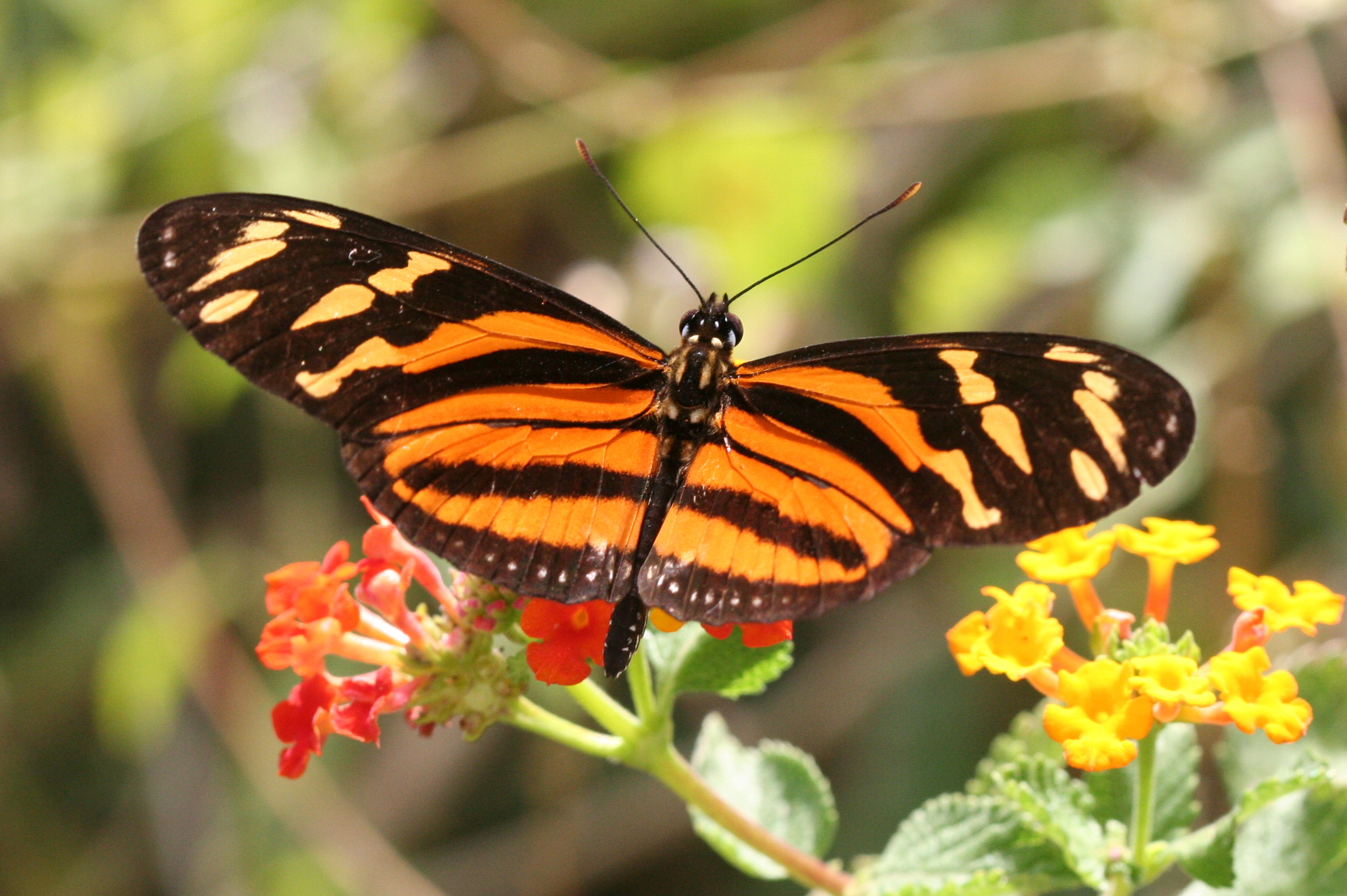
- Eueides isabella

Scientific classification
- Domain: Eukaryota
- Kingdom: Animalia
- Phylum: Arthropoda
- Class: Insecta
- Order: Lepidoptera
- Family: Nymphalidae
- Tribe: Heliconiini
- Genus: Eueides; Hübner, 1816

Species
- 13, see text

Synonyms
- Mechanitis Illiger, [1807]; Semelia Doubleday, [1845]; Evides Agassiz, [1847]

= Eueides =

Genus of brush-footed butterflies

Eueides is a genus of butterflies of the subfamily Heliconiinae in the family Nymphalidae.

== Species ==
Listed alphabetically:

- Eueides aliphera (Godart, 1819) – Juliette
- Eueides emsleyi Brown, 1976
- Eueides heliconioides C. & R. Felder, 1861
- Eueides mereaui (Hübner, 1816)
- Eueides isabella (Stoll, [1781]) – Isabella's longwing or Isabella's heliconian
- Eueides lampeto Bates, 1862
- Eueides libitina (Staudinger, 1885)
- Eueides lineata Salvin & Godman, 1868
- Eueides lybia (Fabricius, 1775) – Lybia longwing
- Eueides pavana Ménétriés, 1857
- Eueides procula Doubleday, 1847
- Eueides tales (Cramer, [1775])
- Eueides vibilia (Godart, 1819)
