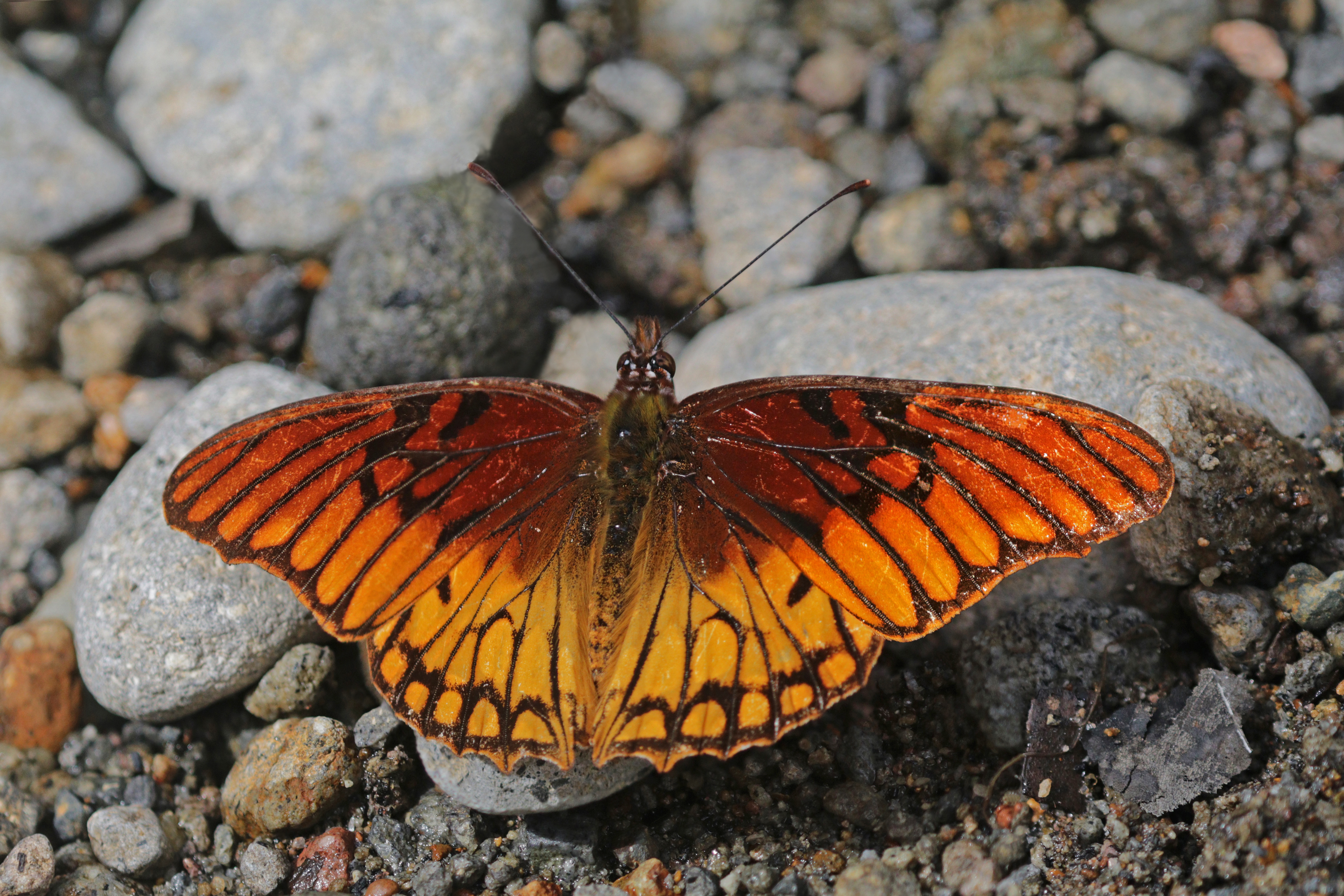
- D. m. poeyii Mount Totumas cloud forest, Panama
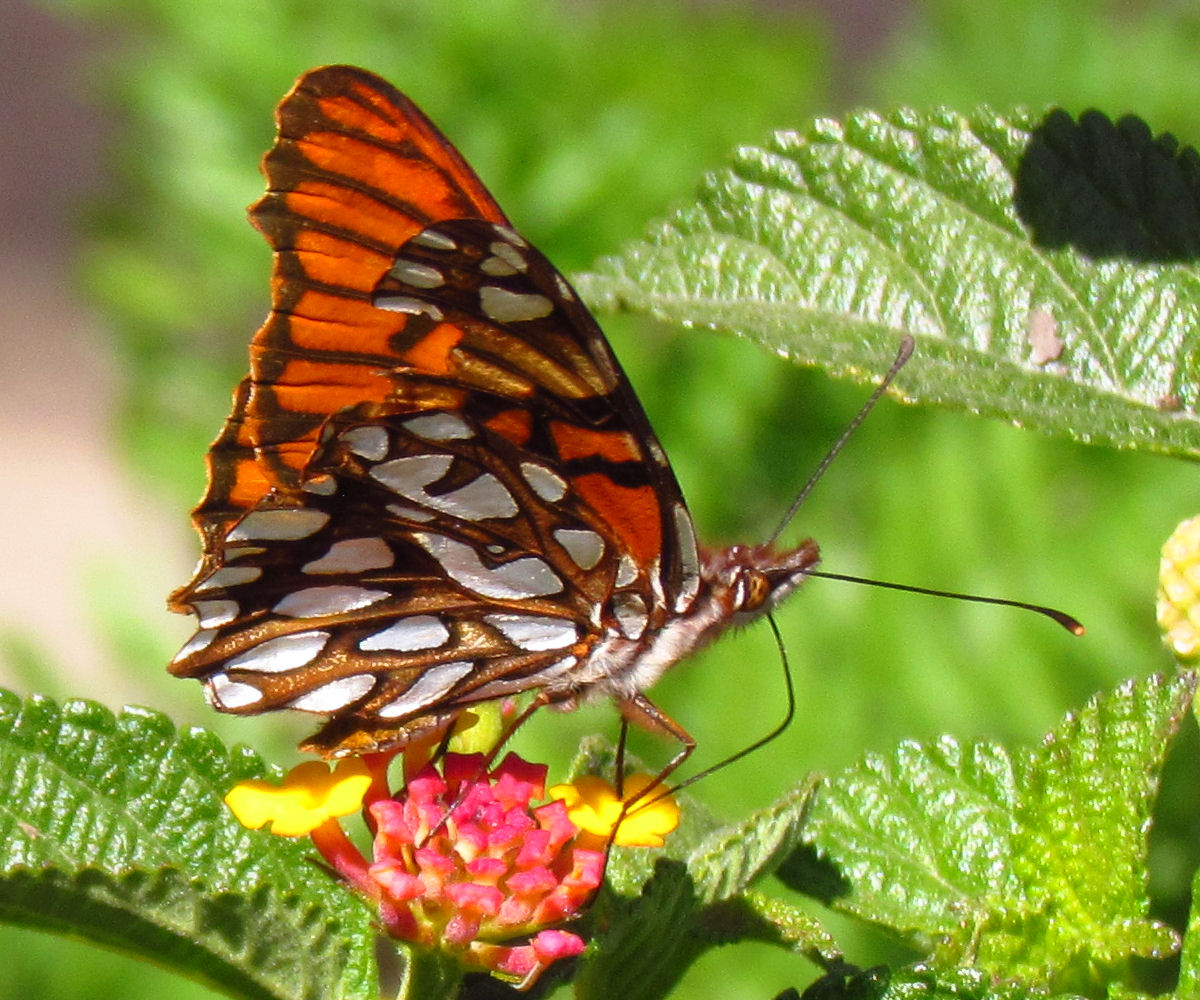
- Quito, Ecuador

Scientific classification
- Domain: Eukaryota
- Kingdom: Animalia
- Phylum: Arthropoda
- Class: Insecta
- Order: Lepidoptera
- Family: Nymphalidae
- Genus: Dione
- Species: D. moneta

Binomial name
- Dione moneta (Cramer, [1779])

Subspecies
- See text

Synonyms
- Dione poeyii Butler, 1873; Agraulis moneta Doubleday, 1848 (not Hübner, 1819)

= Dione moneta =

Mexican silverspot

Species of butterfly

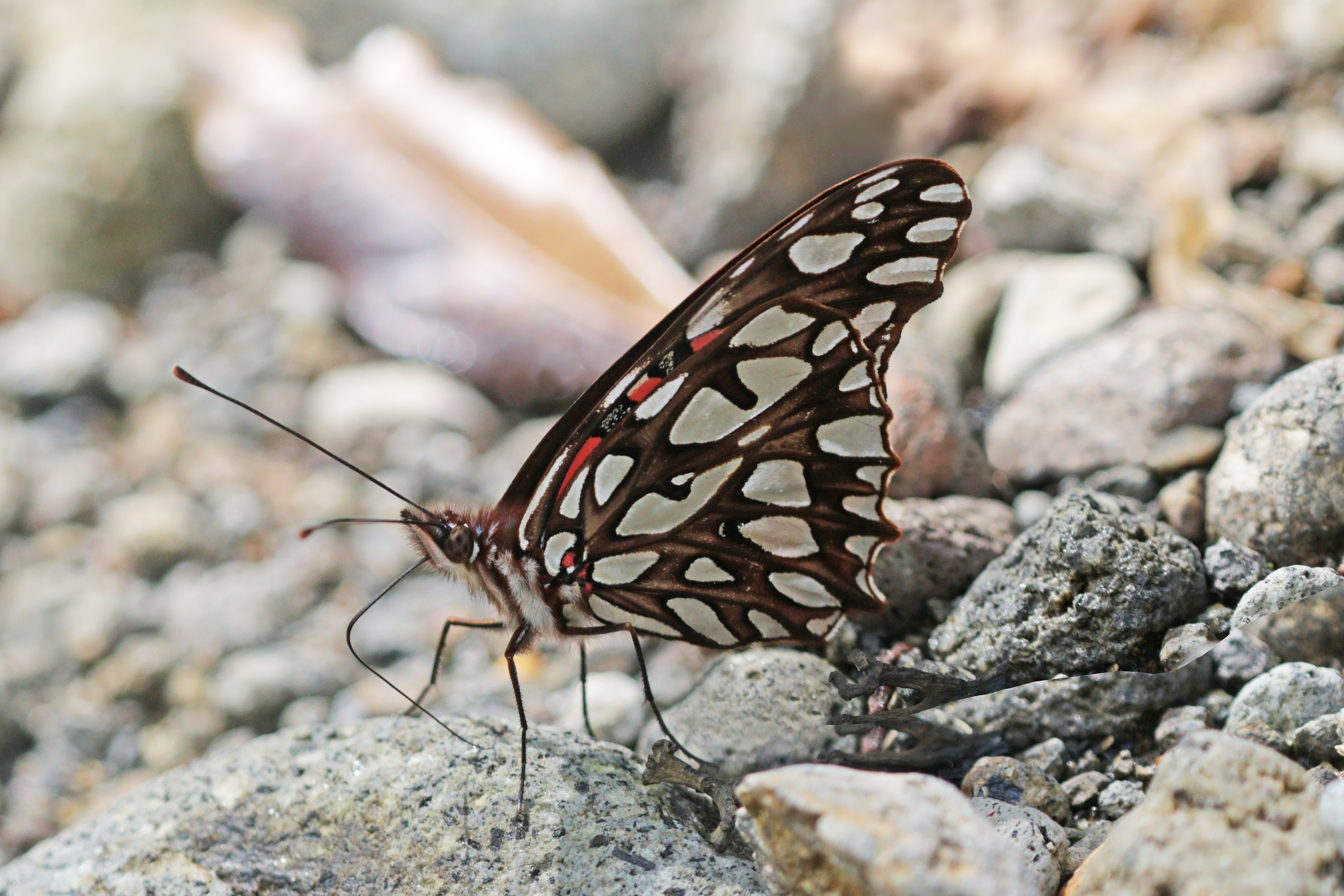
D. m. poeyii Mount Totumas cloud forest, Panama

Dione moneta, the Mexican silverspot, is a species of butterfly of the subfamily Heliconiinae in the family Nymphalidae, found from the southern United States to South America.

== Description ==
D. moneta has an orange upperside, and the wing bases are brown in color. It has thick, dark veins. The hind wing of the underside of these butterflies is brown and covered in big, silver spots. Its wings span from 3 – 3 and 1/4 inches.

== Etymology ==
Moneta is a name given to two goddesses from Roman mythology, both representing fortune and wealth.

== Subspecies ==
Listed alphabetically:

- D. m. butleri Stichel, [1908]
- D. m. moneta Hübner, [1825]
- D. m. poeyii Butler, 1873
