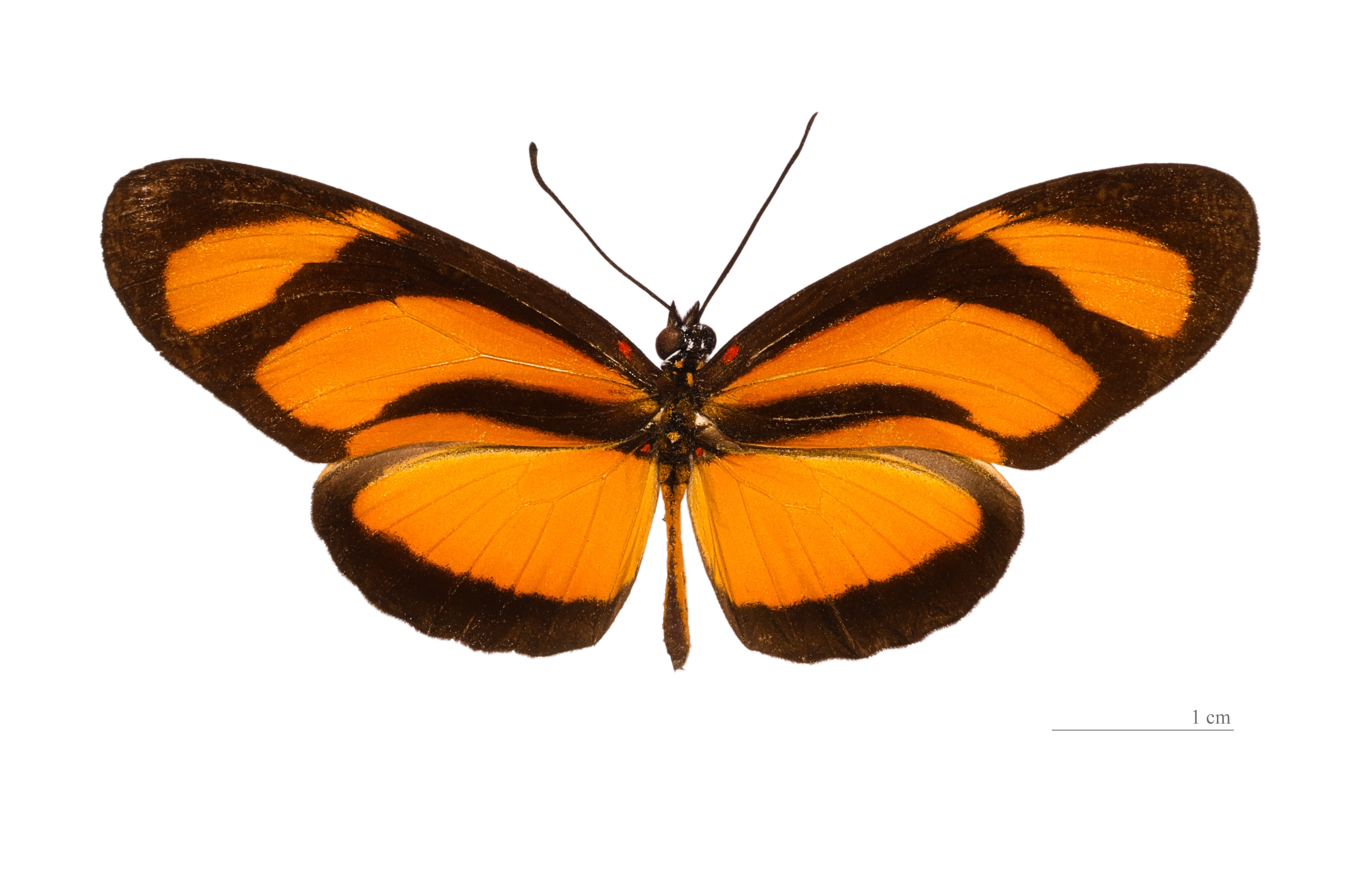
- Dorsal view
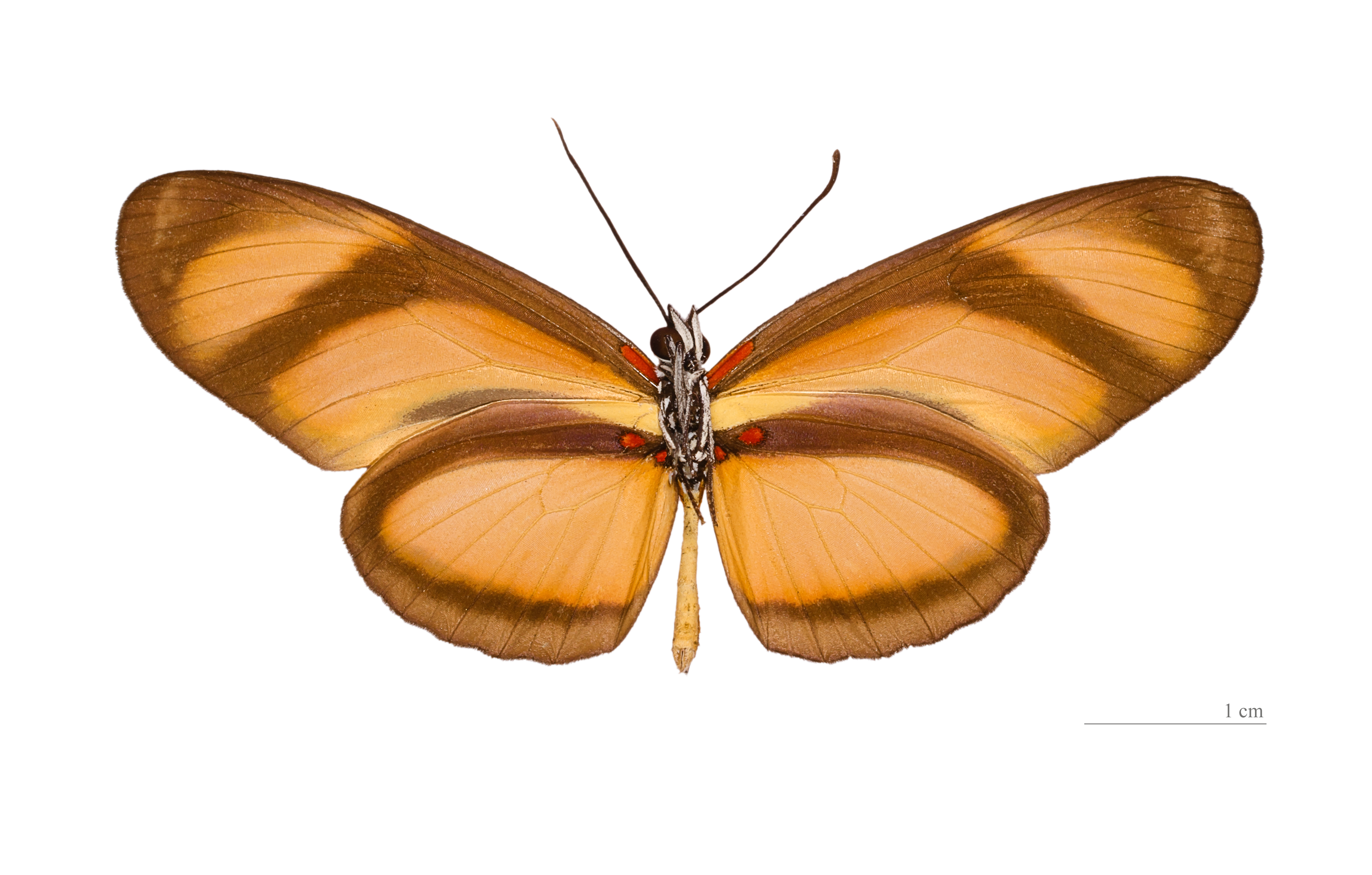
- Ventral view

Scientific classification
- Domain: Eukaryota
- Kingdom: Animalia
- Phylum: Arthropoda
- Class: Insecta
- Order: Lepidoptera
- Family: Nymphalidae
- Genus: Eueides
- Species: E. lybia

Binomial name
- Eueides lybia (Fabricius, 1775)

Synonyms
- Papilio lybia Fabricius, 1775; Papilio hypsipyle Cramer, 1777; Papilio olympia Fabricius, 1793; Eueides leucomma Bates, 1866; Eueides lybioides Staudinger, 1876

= Eueides lybia =

Lybia longwing

Species of butterfly

Eueides lybia, the lybia longwing, is a butterfly of the family Nymphalidae. It was described by Johan Christian Fabricius in 1775. It is found from Central America to northern South America, from Nicaragua to Bolivia.

== Subspecies ==
- Eueides lybia lybia (Suriname)
- Eueides lybia lybioides Staudinger, 1876 (Costa Rica, Panama)
- Eueides lybia olympia (Fabricius, 1793) (Nicaragua to Colombia)
- Eueides lybia orinocensis Brown & Fernández, 1985 (Venezuela)
- Eueides lybia otelloi Brown & Fernández, 1985 (Venezuela)
- Eueides lybia salcedoi Brown & Fernández, 1985 (Venezuela)
