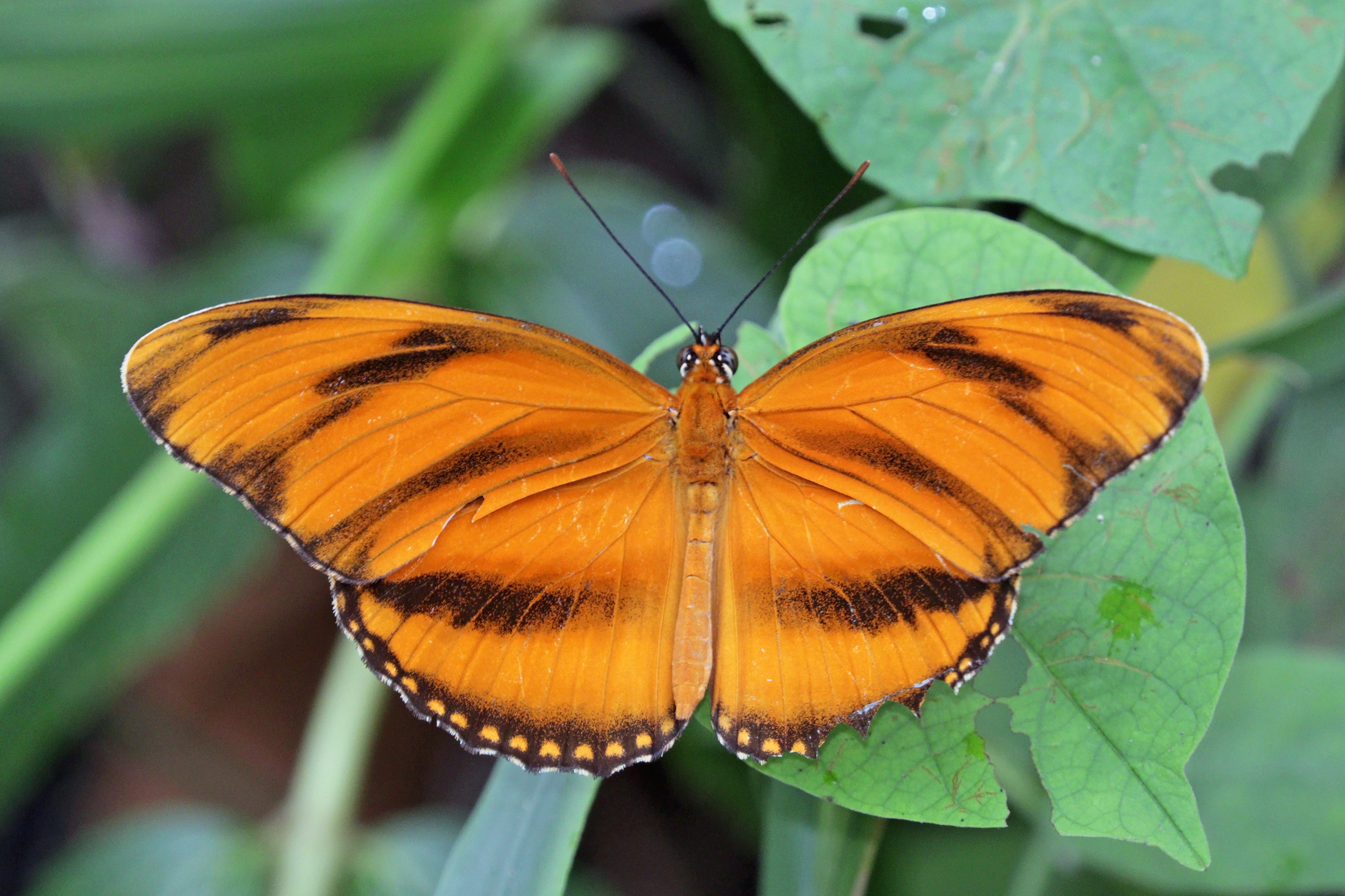
- male, dorsal view Panama
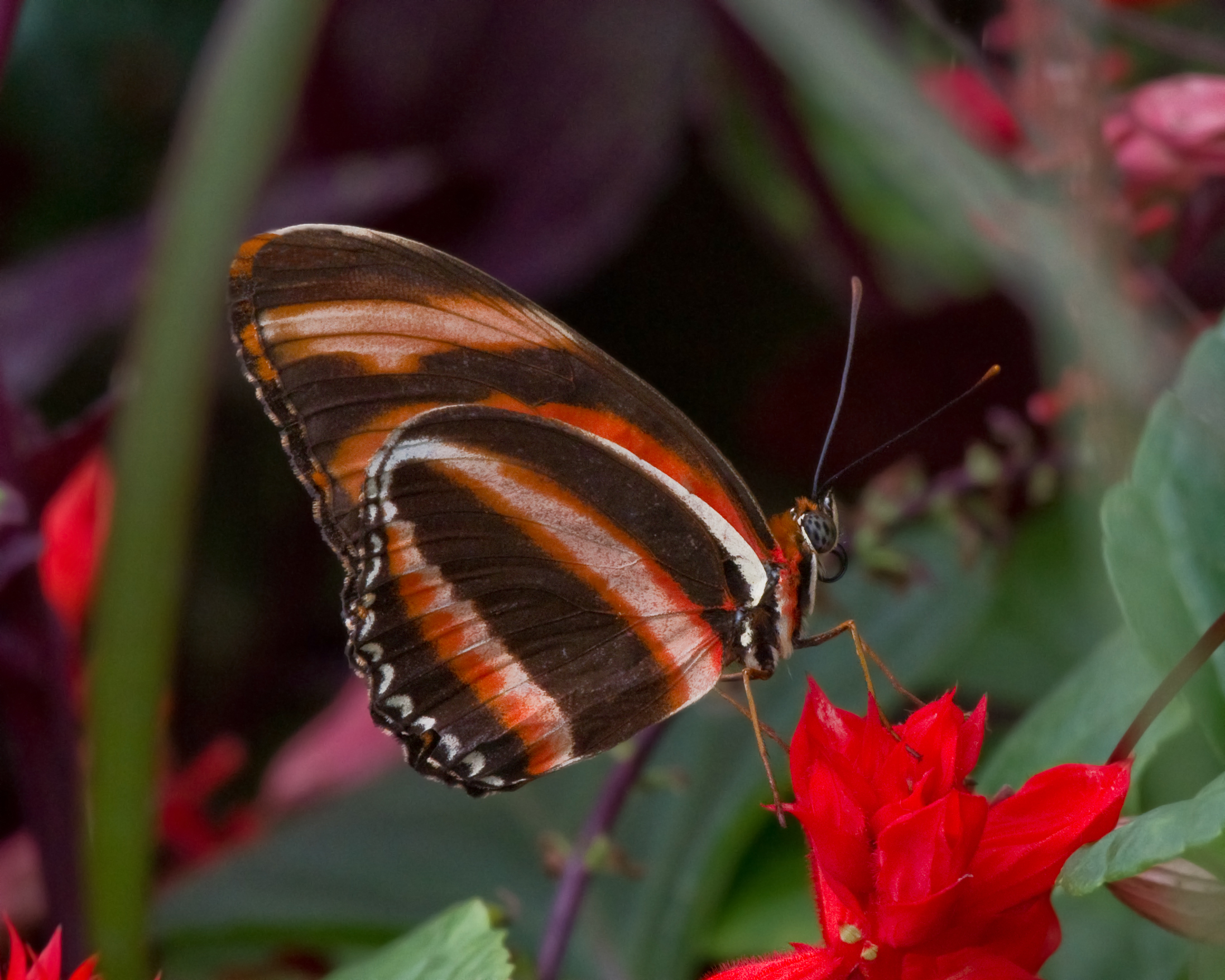
- female, ventral view

Scientific classification
- Kingdom: Animalia
- Phylum: Arthropoda
- Class: Insecta
- Order: Lepidoptera
- Family: Nymphalidae
- Tribe: Heliconiini
- Genus: Dryadula; Michner, 1942
- Species: D. phaetusa

Binomial name
- Dryadula phaetusa (Linnaeus, 1758)

= Dryadula phaetusa =

Banded orange heliconian

Sole species in brush-footed butterfly genus Dryadula

Dryadula is a monotypic genus of the butterfly family Nymphalidae. Its single species, Dryadula phaetusa, known as the banded orange heliconian, banded orange, or orange tiger, is native from Brazil to central Mexico, and in summer can be found rarely as far north as central Florida. Its wingspan ranges from 86 to 89 mm, and it is colored a bright orange with thick black stripes in males and a duller orange with fuzzier black stripes in females.

It feeds primarily on the nectar of flowers and on bird droppings; its caterpillar feeds on passion vines including Passiflora tetrastylis. It is generally found in lowland tropical fields and valleys.

This species is unpalatable to birds and belongs to the "orange" Müllerian mimicry complex.

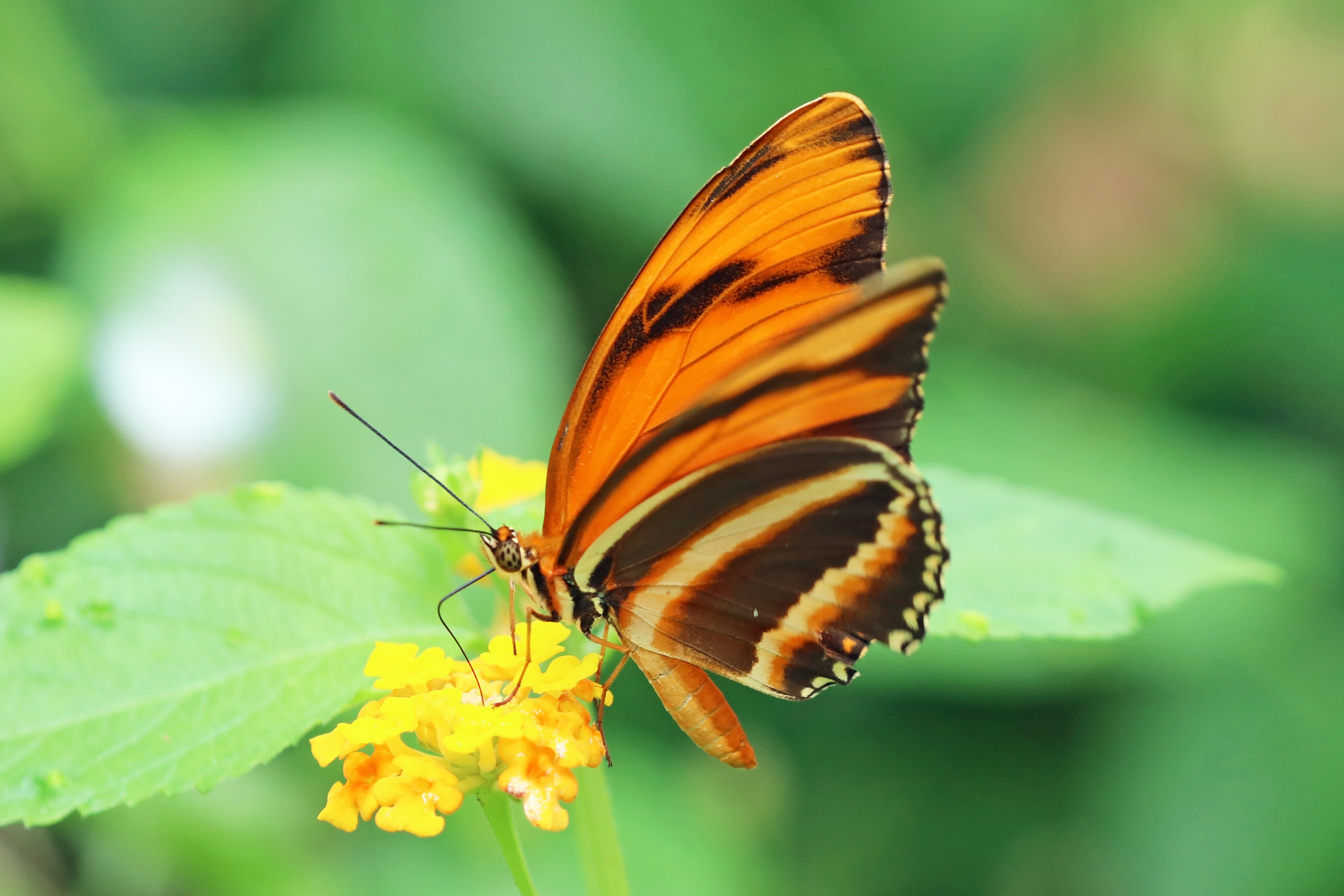
male underside

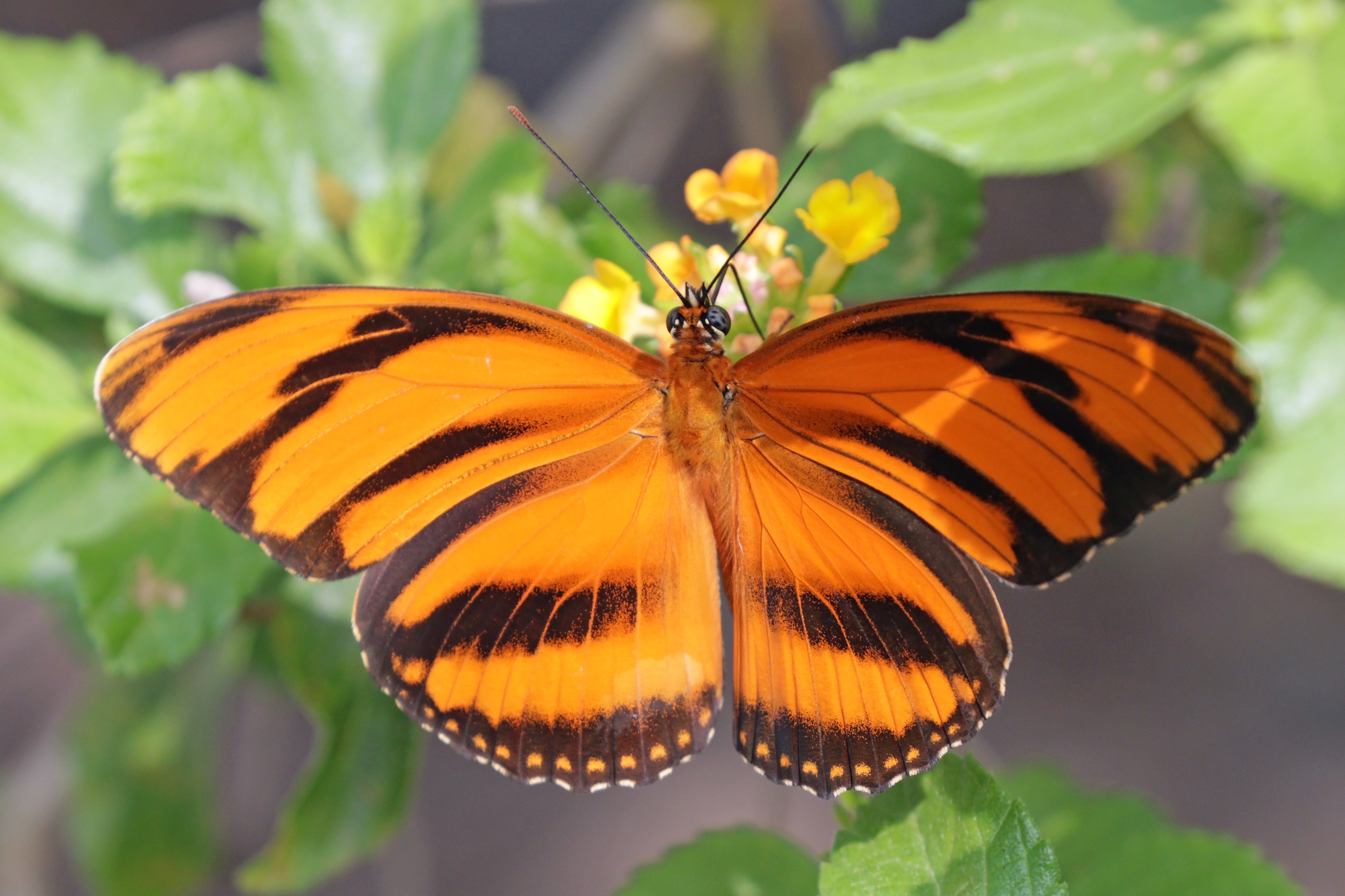
female dorsal side

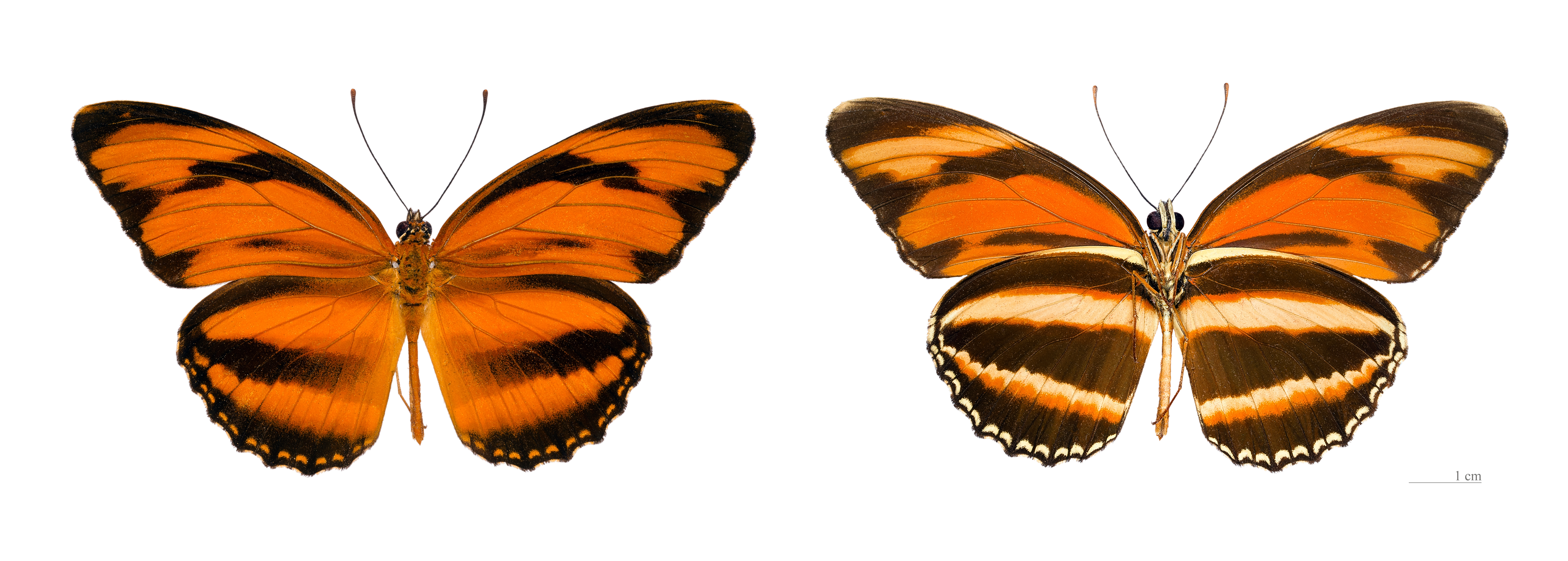
pinned specimen (both sides) - MHNT

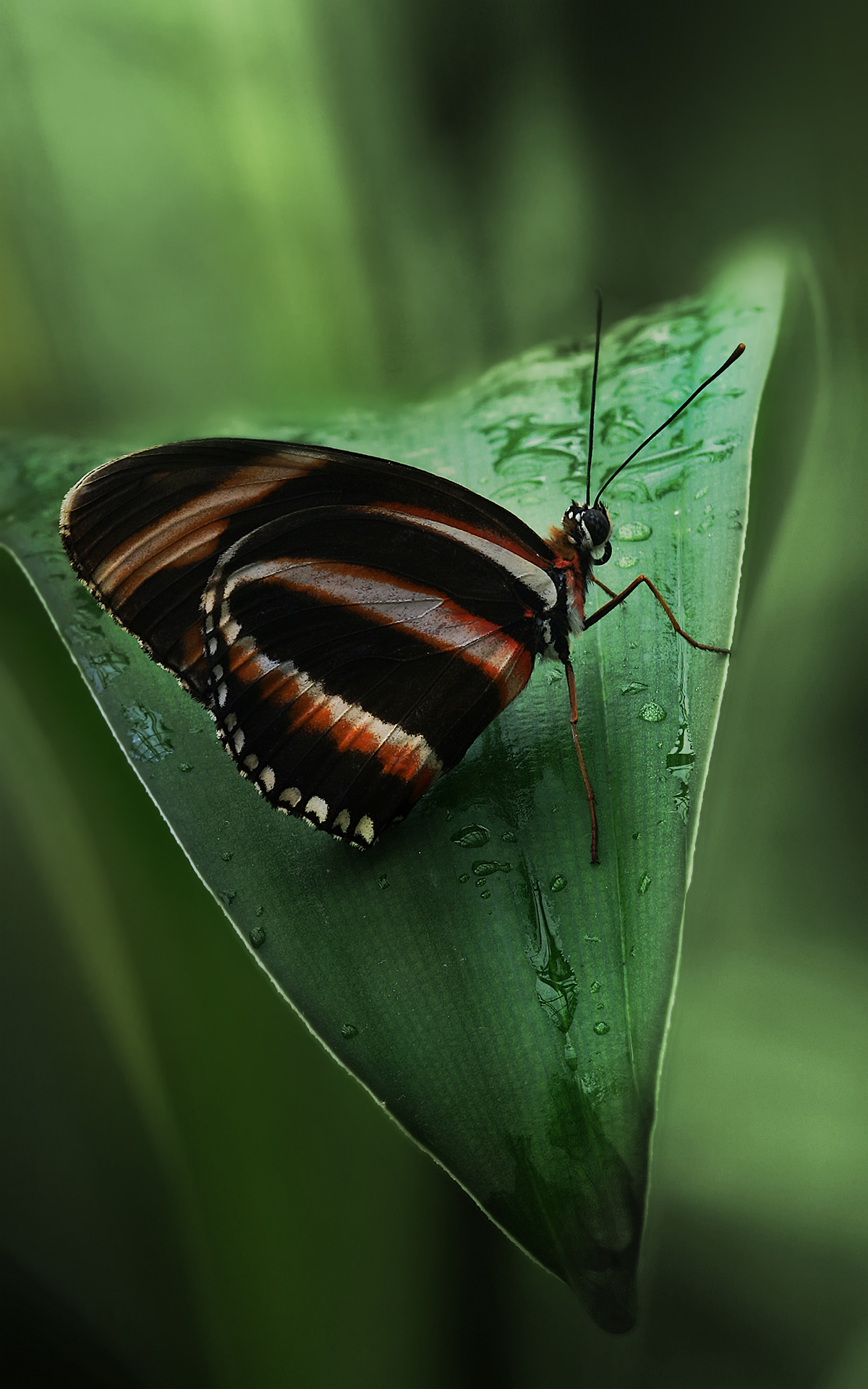
female underside

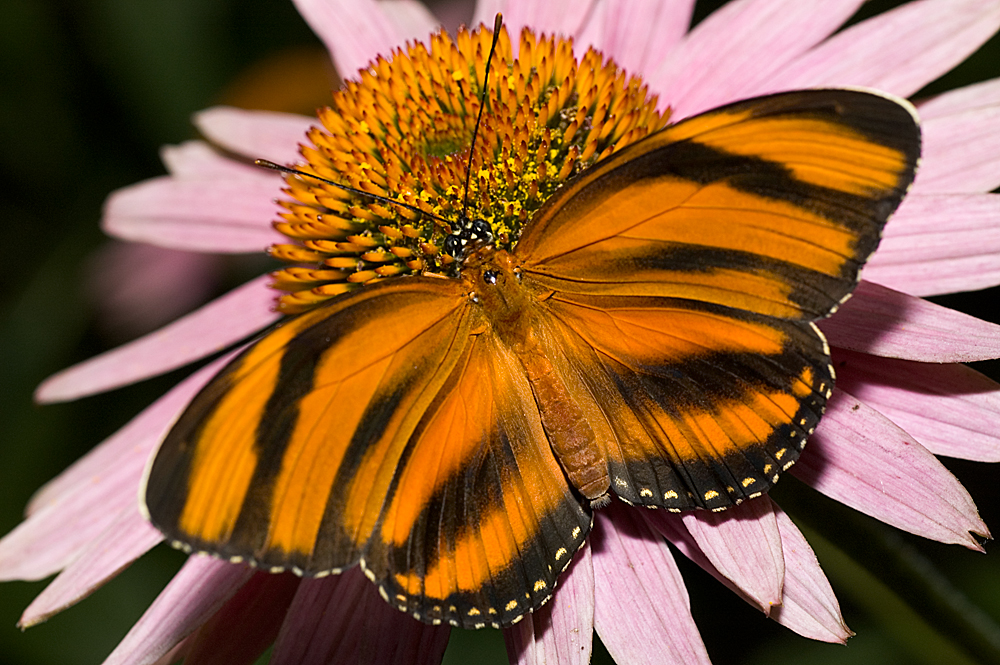
pinned specimen (female dorsal side)

== Symbiosis ==
Prior to their mating season, males of this species congregate by the hundreds on patches of moist soil that contain mineral salts, a behavior known as mud-puddling. When they cannot find such deposits, the insects visit various animals to drink salty secretions from their skin and nostrils.

== Taxonomy ==
The genus Dryadula Michner, 1942, is monotypic; the type species is Papilio phaetusa Linnaeus, 1758 (Syst. Nat. 10 ed., 1: 478). The type locality, given as "Indiis", is supposed to refer to the West Indies or northern South America.
