= Philaethria andrei =

Scientific classification
- Domain: Eukaryota
- Kingdom: Animalia
- Phylum: Arthropoda
- Class: Insecta
- Order: Lepidoptera
- Family: Nymphalidae
- Genus: Philaethria
- Species: P. andrei

Binomial name
- Philaethria andrei Brevignon, 2002

Species of butterfly

Philaethria andrei is a butterfly of the family Nymphalidae. It was described by Christian Brévignon in 2002. It is found from southern Venezuela throughout the Guiana Shield to the mouth of the Amazon River in Brazil.

The larvae feed on Passiflora laurifolia.

== Subspecies ==
- Philaethria andrei andrei (mouth of Amazon to southern Venezuela)
- Philaethria andrei orinocoensis Constantino & Salazar, 2010 (Orinoco Basin in Venezuela)
