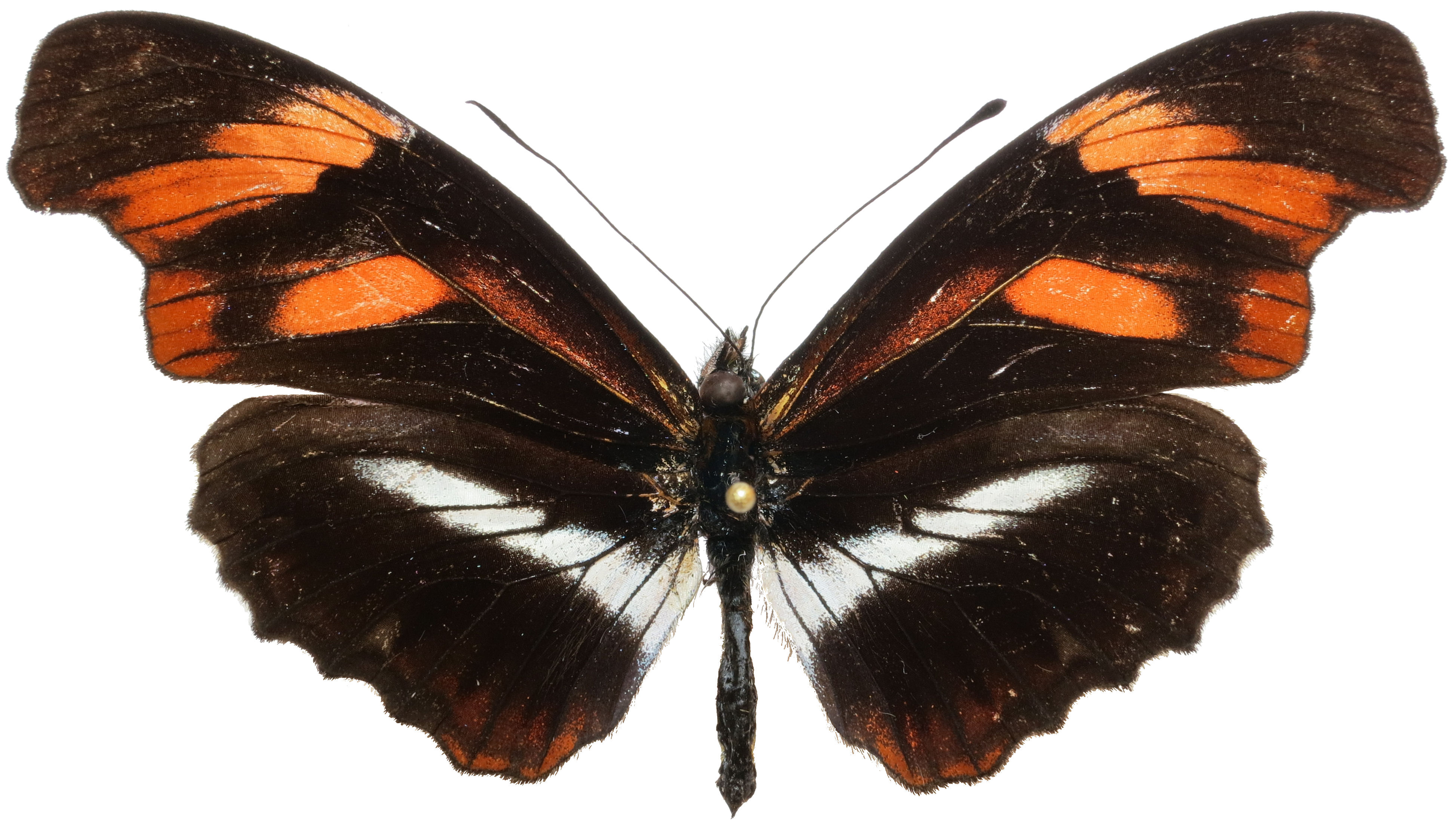
- Podotricha telesiphe

Scientific classification
- Domain: Eukaryota
- Kingdom: Animalia
- Phylum: Arthropoda
- Class: Insecta
- Order: Lepidoptera
- Family: Nymphalidae
- Tribe: Heliconiini
- Genus: Podotricha; Michener, 1942

Species
- See text

= Podotricha =

Genus of brush-footed butterflies

Podotricha is a genus of butterflies of the subfamily Heliconiinae in the family Nymphalidae.

== Species ==
- Podotricha judith (Guérin-Ménéville, 1844)
- Podotricha telesiphe (Hewitson, 1867) – podotricha longwing
