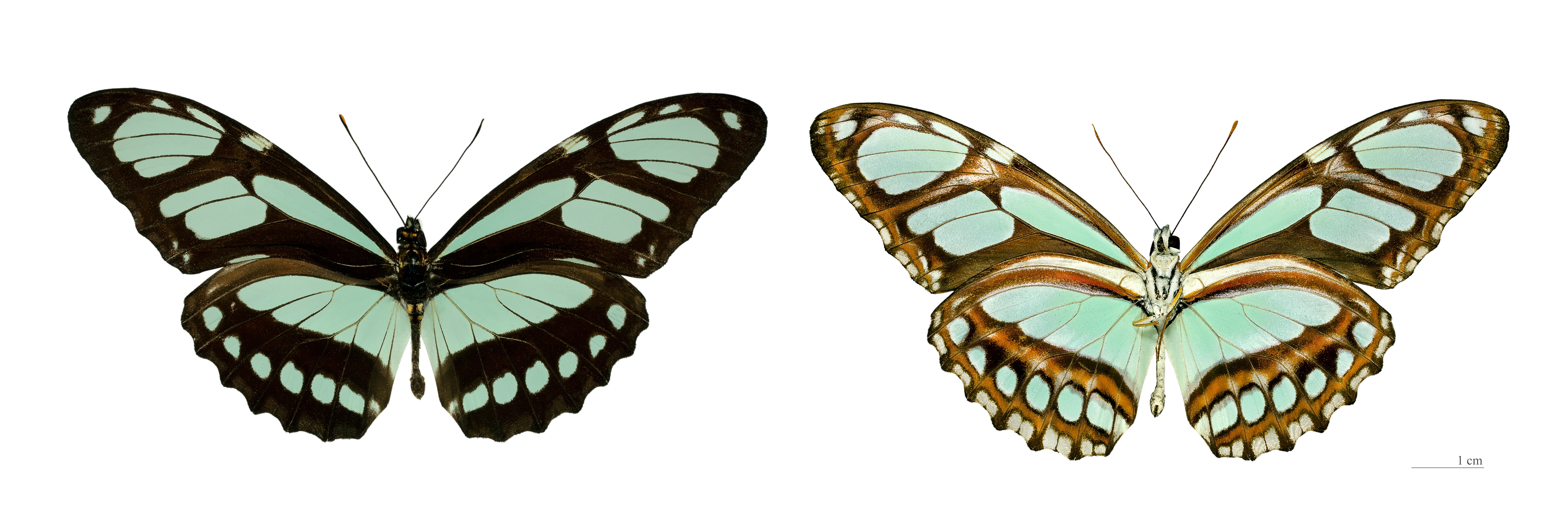

Scientific classification
- Domain: Eukaryota
- Kingdom: Animalia
- Phylum: Arthropoda
- Class: Insecta
- Order: Lepidoptera
- Family: Nymphalidae
- Genus: Philaethria
- Species: P. pygmalion

Binomial name
- Philaethria pygmalion (Fruhstorfer, 1912)

Synonyms
- Metamandana dido pygmalion Fruhstorfer, 1912

= Philaethria pygmalion =

Species of butterfly

Philaethria pygmalion is a butterfly of the family Nymphalidae. It was described by Hans Fruhstorfer in 1912. It is found from eastern Colombia to central Brazil.

The larvae feed on Passiflora species P. coccinea, P. faroana, P. hexagonocarpa, P. mansoi and P. phaeocaula.

== Subspecies ==
- Philaethria pygmalion pygmalion (southern Colombia and Venezuela to central Brazil)
- Philaethria pygmalion metaensis Constantino & Salazar 2010 (Colombia: Meta)
