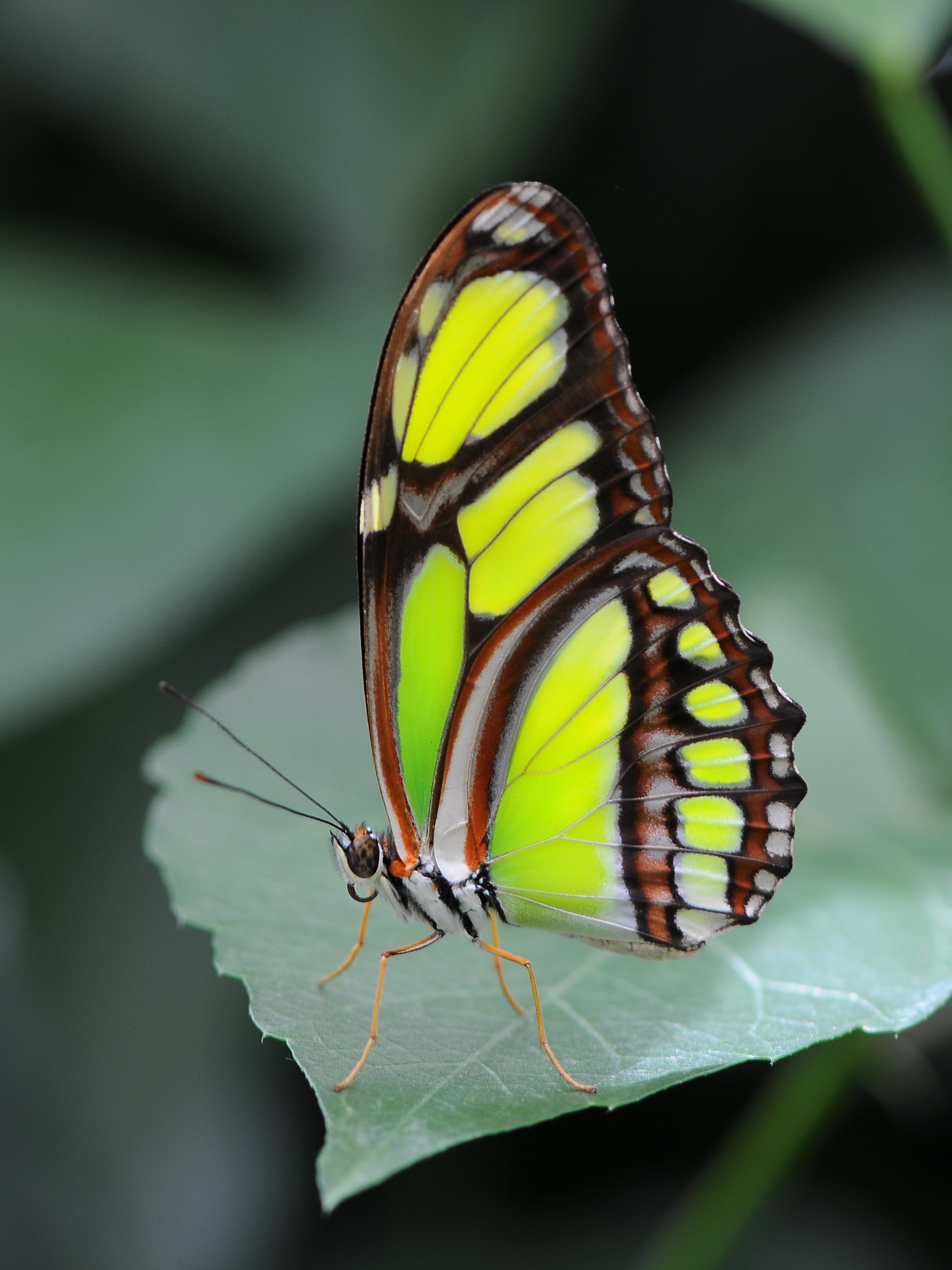
- Philaethria dido

Scientific classification
- Kingdom: Animalia
- Phylum: Arthropoda
- Class: Insecta
- Order: Lepidoptera
- Family: Nymphalidae
- Tribe: Heliconiini
- Genus: Philaethria; Billberg, 1820

Species
- See text

Synonyms
- Metamandana Stichel, 1908

= Philaethria =

Genus of brush-footed butterflies

Philaethria is a genus of New World butterflies of the subfamily Heliconiinae in the family Nymphalidae.

== Species ==
The following is a list of species classified under Philaethria:

- Philaethria andrei Brevignon, 2002 - Found in Macouria, French Guiana
- Philaethria constantinoi Salazar, 1991 - (incertae sedis) Found in the Chocó Department of western Colombia
- Philaethria diatonica (Fruhstorfer, 1912) - Found in Central America and Mexico
- Philaethria dido (Linnaeus, 1763) – scarce bamboo page, longwing dido, or green heliconia – The most widespread species of Philaethria. It can be found as far north as Mexico and Texas to as far south as the Amazon basin.
- Philaethria ostara (Röber, 1906) - Found in the Cauca Department of western Colombia
- Philaethria pygmalion (Fruhstorfer, 1912) - Found in the state of Pará, Brazil
- Philaethria wernickei (Röber, 1906) - Found in the states of Santa Catarina and Rio Grande do Sul of Brazil
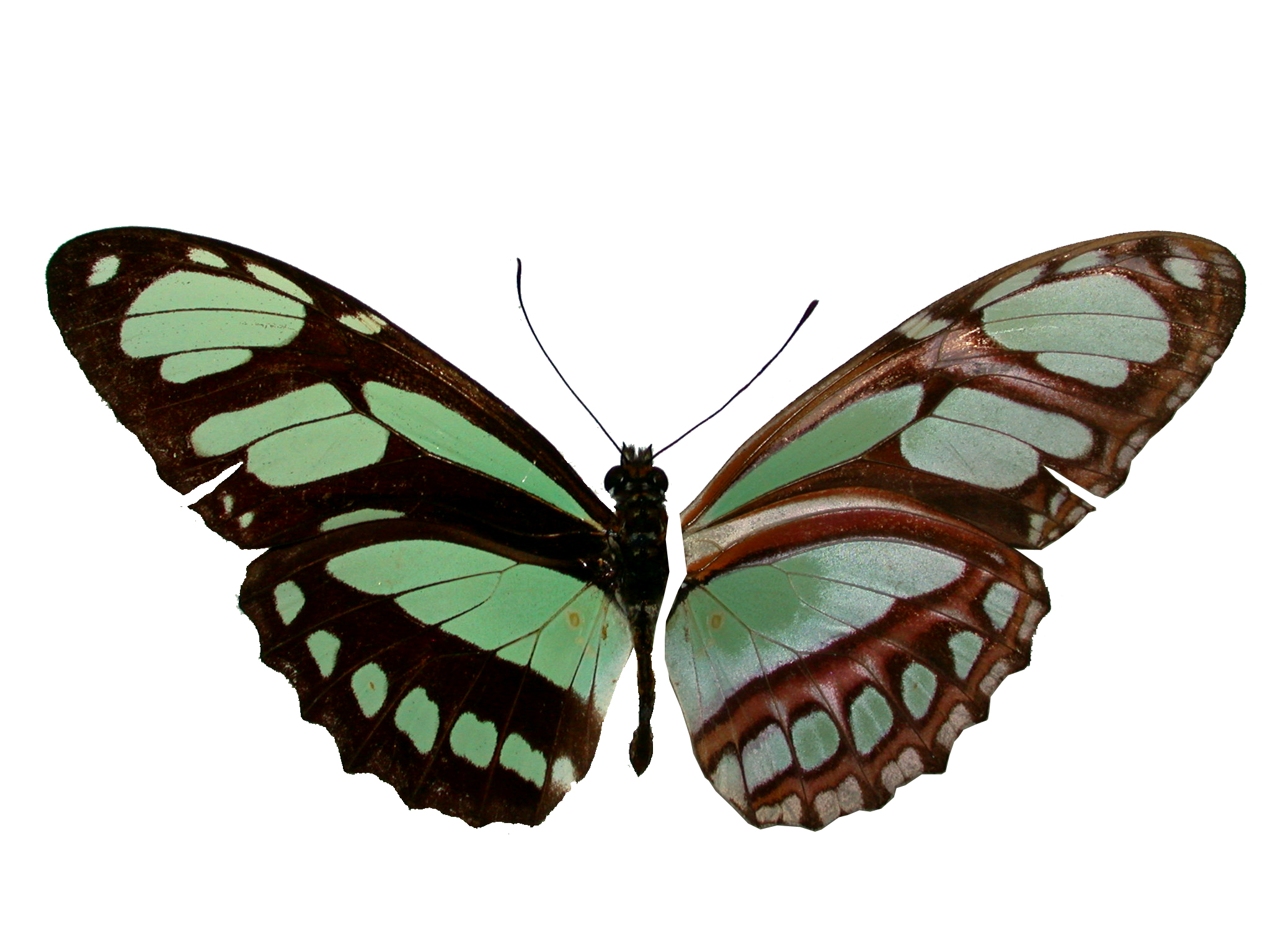
Philaethria dido

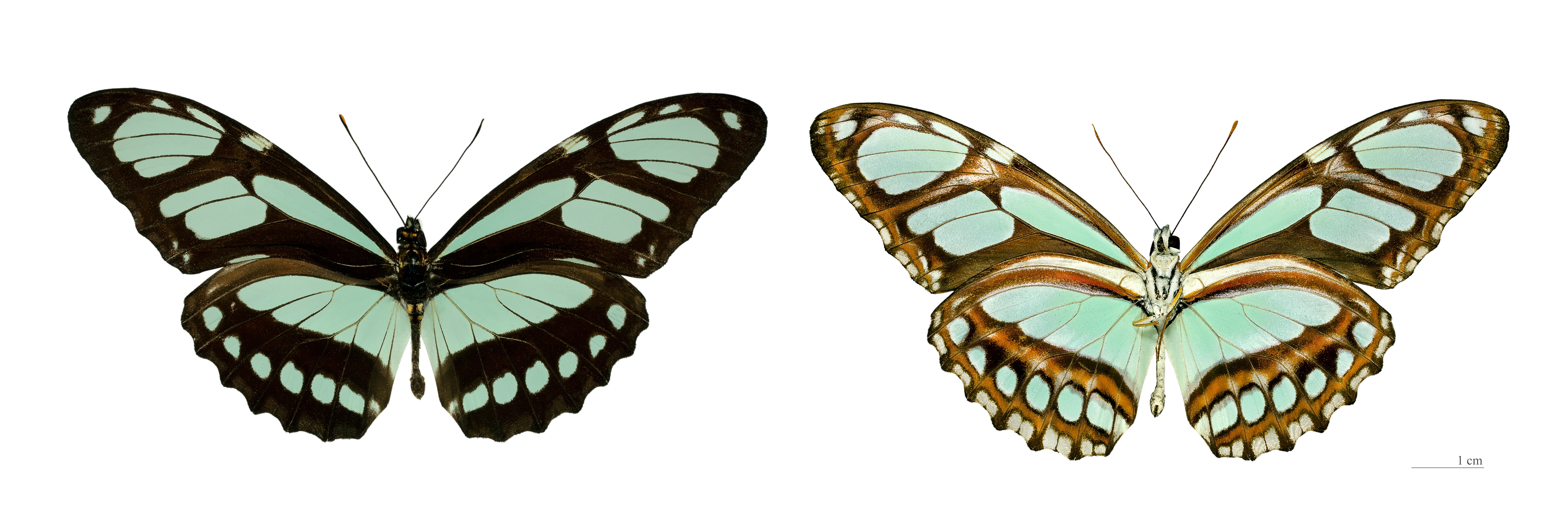
Philaethria pygmalion - MHNT
