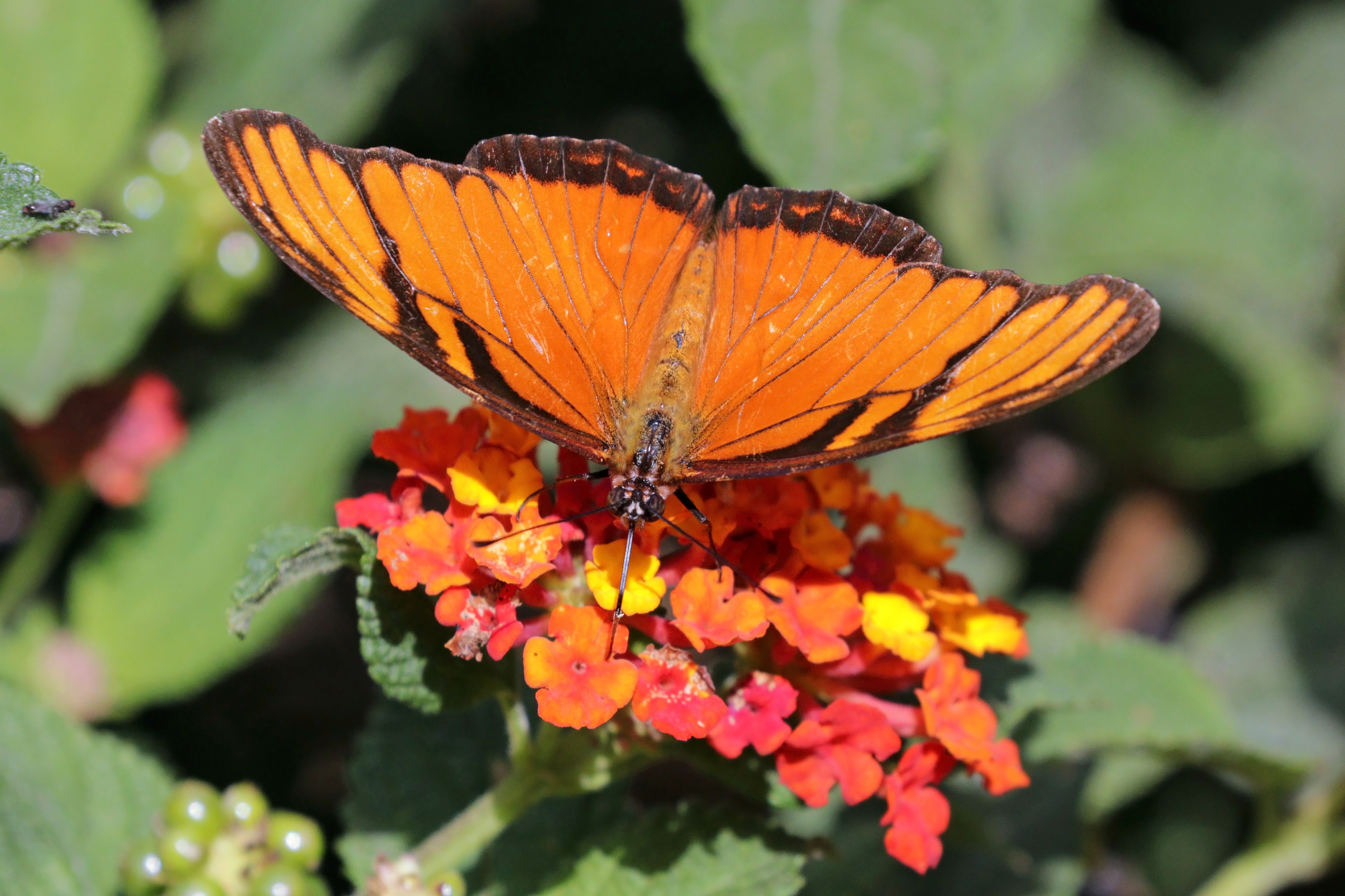
- D. j. huascuma, Costa Rica
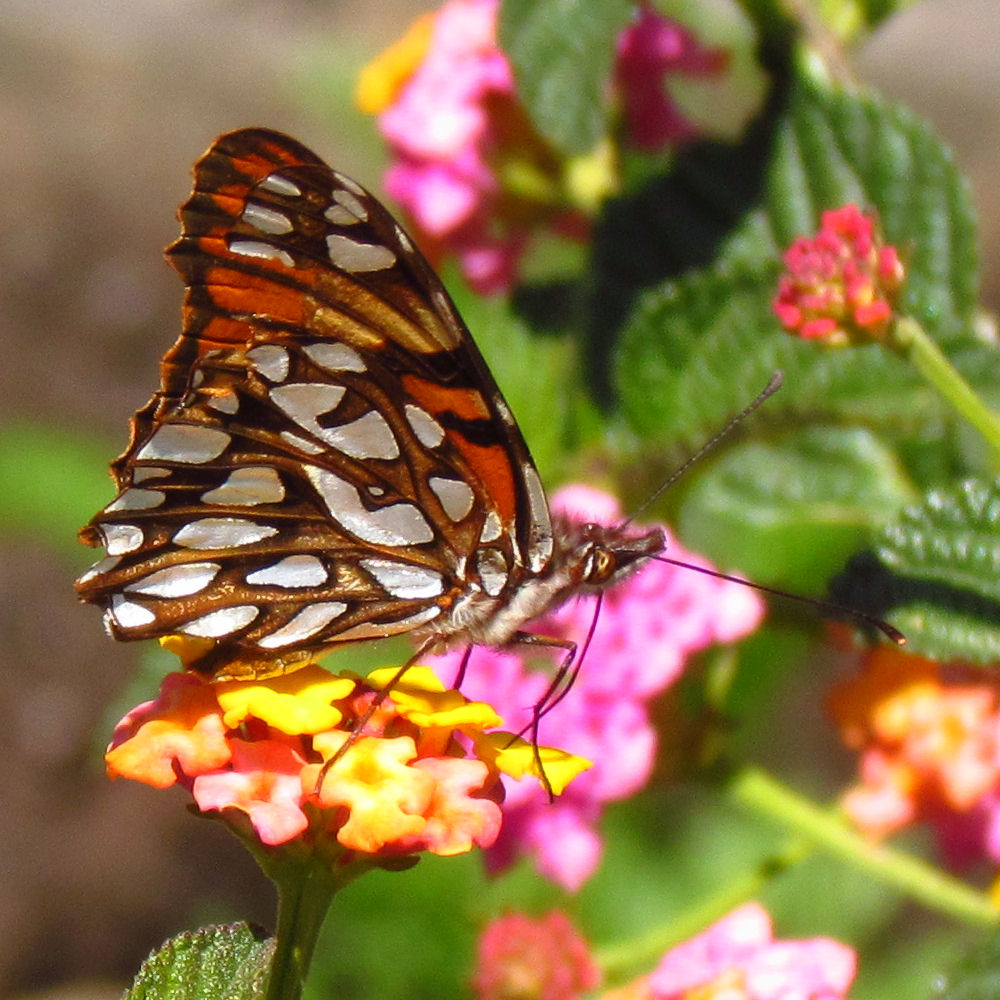
- Underwing, Quito, Ecuador

Scientific classification
- Domain: Eukaryota
- Kingdom: Animalia
- Phylum: Arthropoda
- Class: Insecta
- Order: Lepidoptera
- Family: Nymphalidae
- Genus: Dione
- Species: D. juno

Binomial name
- Dione juno (Cramer, [1779])

Subspecies
- See text

Synonyms
- Papilio juno Cramer, [1779]; Agraulis juno; Agraulis huascuma Reakirt, 1866; Dione miraculosa Hering, 1926; Dione juno ab. suffumata Hayward, 1931

= Dione juno =

Juno silverspot

Species of butterfly

Dione juno, the Juno silverspot, juno longwing, or Juno heliconian, is a species of butterfly of the subfamily Heliconiinae in the family Nymphalidae found from southern United States to South America.

== Subspecies ==
Listed alphabetically:

- D. j. andicola (Bates, 1864)
- D. j. huascuma (Reakirt, 1866)
- D. j. juno (Cramer, [1779])
- D. j. miraculosa Hering, 1926
- D. j. suffumata Brown & Mielke, 1972
