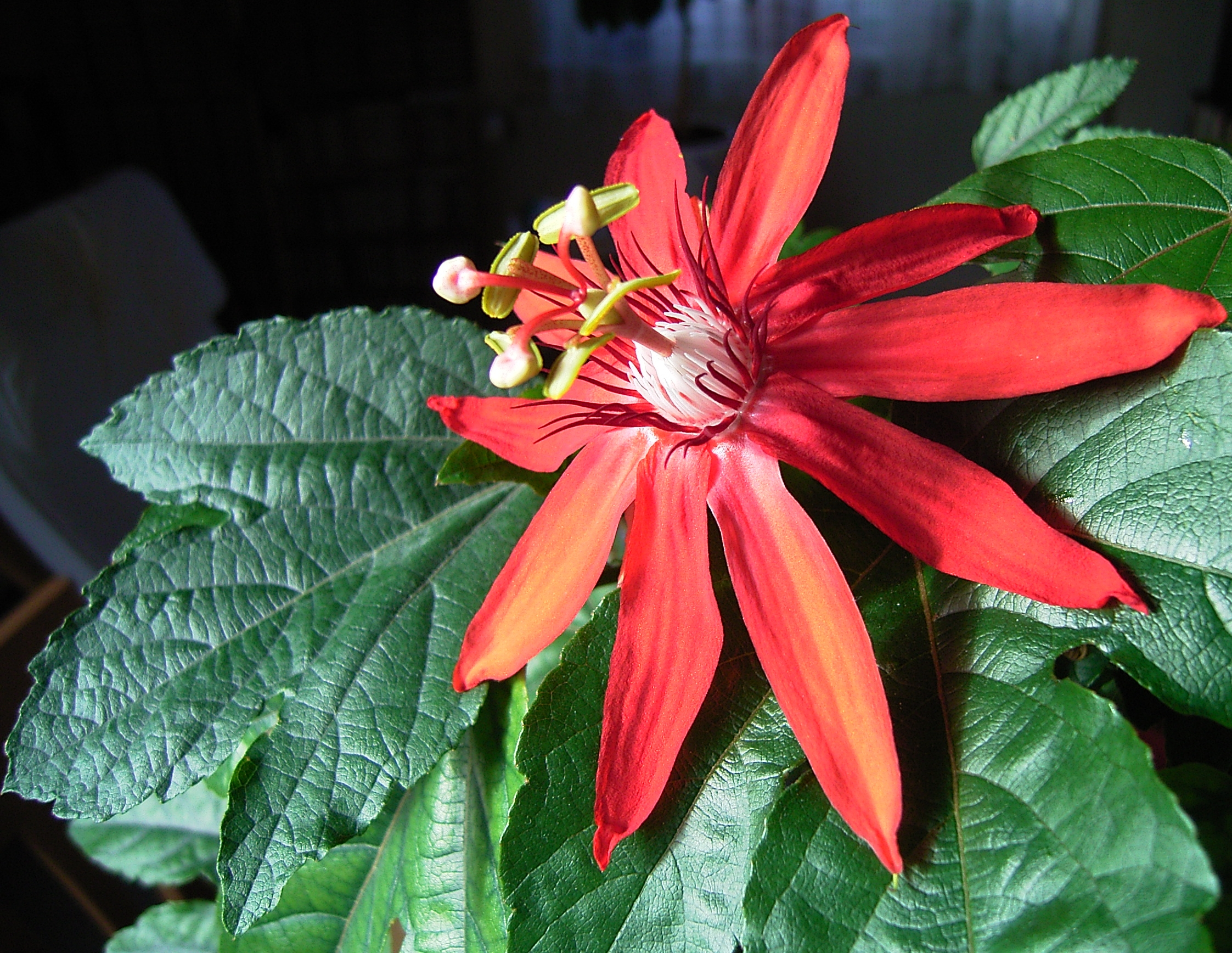

Scientific classification
- Kingdom: Plantae
- Clade: Tracheophytes
- Clade: Angiosperms
- Clade: Eudicots
- Clade: Rosids
- Order: Malpighiales
- Family: Passifloraceae
- Genus: Passiflora
- Species: P. vitifolia

Binomial name
- Passiflora vitifolia Kunth

= Passiflora vitifolia =

Crimson passion flower

Species of plant

Passiflora vitifolia, the perfumed passionflower, is a species of Passiflora native to southern Central America and northwestern South America.

== Description ==
It is a vine with cylindric stems covered in red-brown hairs when young. The leaves are serrate, three-lobed, up to 15 centimetres (6 in) long and 18 cm broad. The lobed leaves' resemblance to grape leaves gives this passionflower its specific epithet, "vitifolia," meaning "grape leaves" after the Latin for grape "vitis." The flowers are bright red, up to 9 cm diameter. The fruit is a berry 5 cm long and 3 cm broad, with green flesh speckled with white, slight downy hairs, containing numerous seeds. The fruit is quite sour when it falls off the plant and can take a month to ripen to its full flavor of sour strawberries. Due to the fragrant fruit, it is in small-scale cultivation in the Caribbean.

== Distribution ==
It is native to southern Central America (Costa Rica, Nicaragua, Panama) and northwestern South America (Venezuela, Colombia, Ecuador, Peru).

== Gallery ==
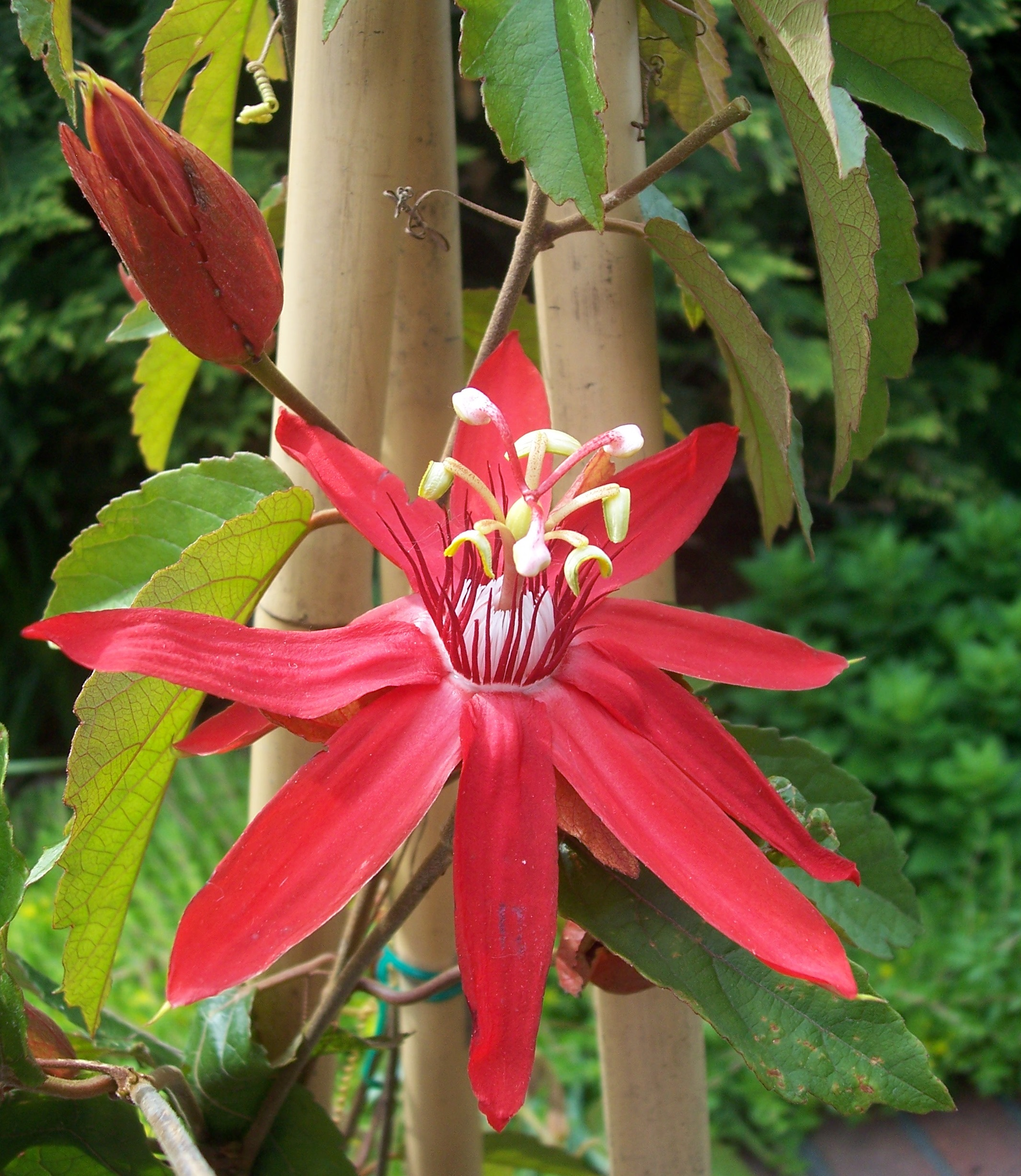
Passiflora vitifolia

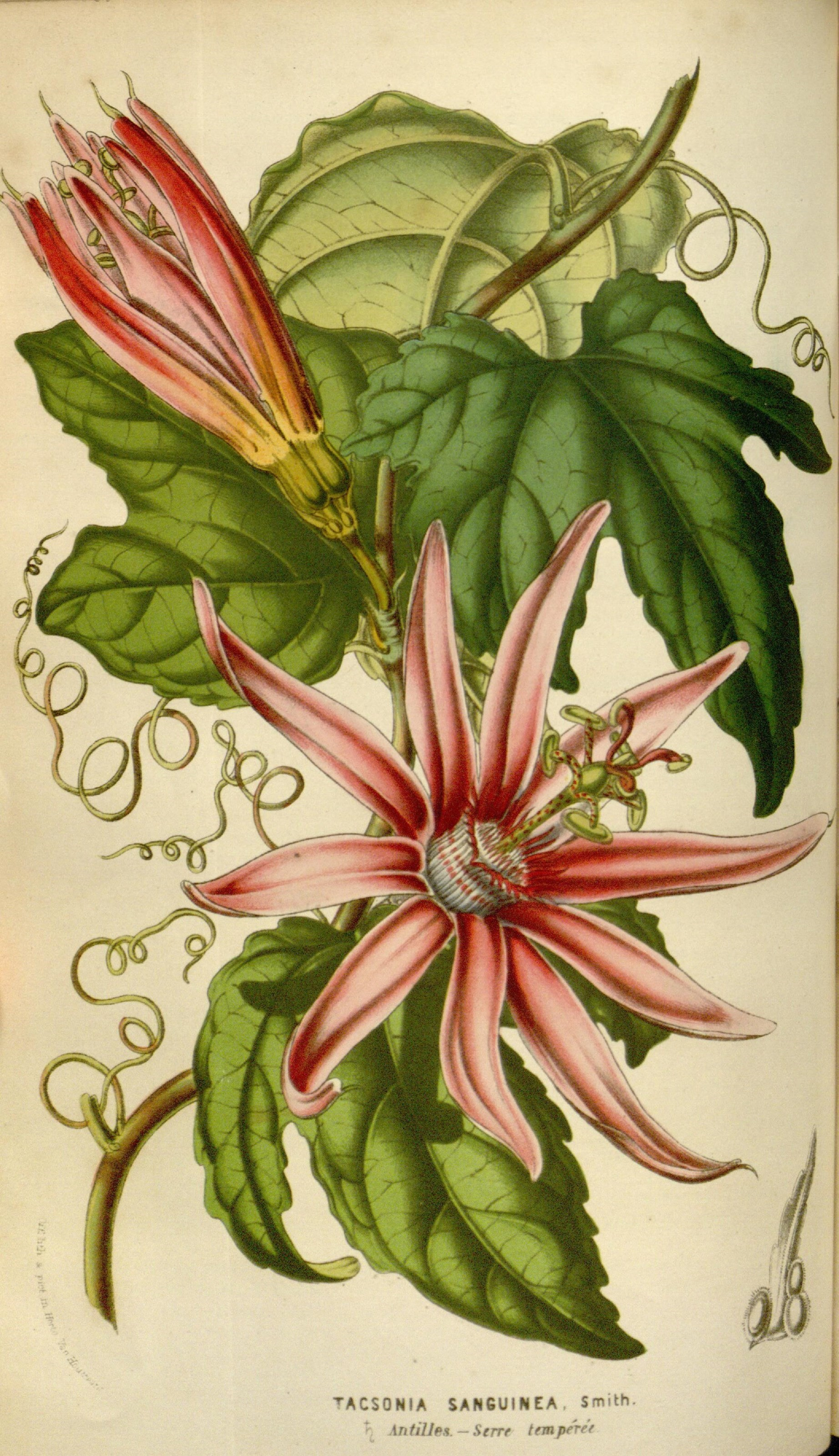
Tacsonia sanguinea Sm.

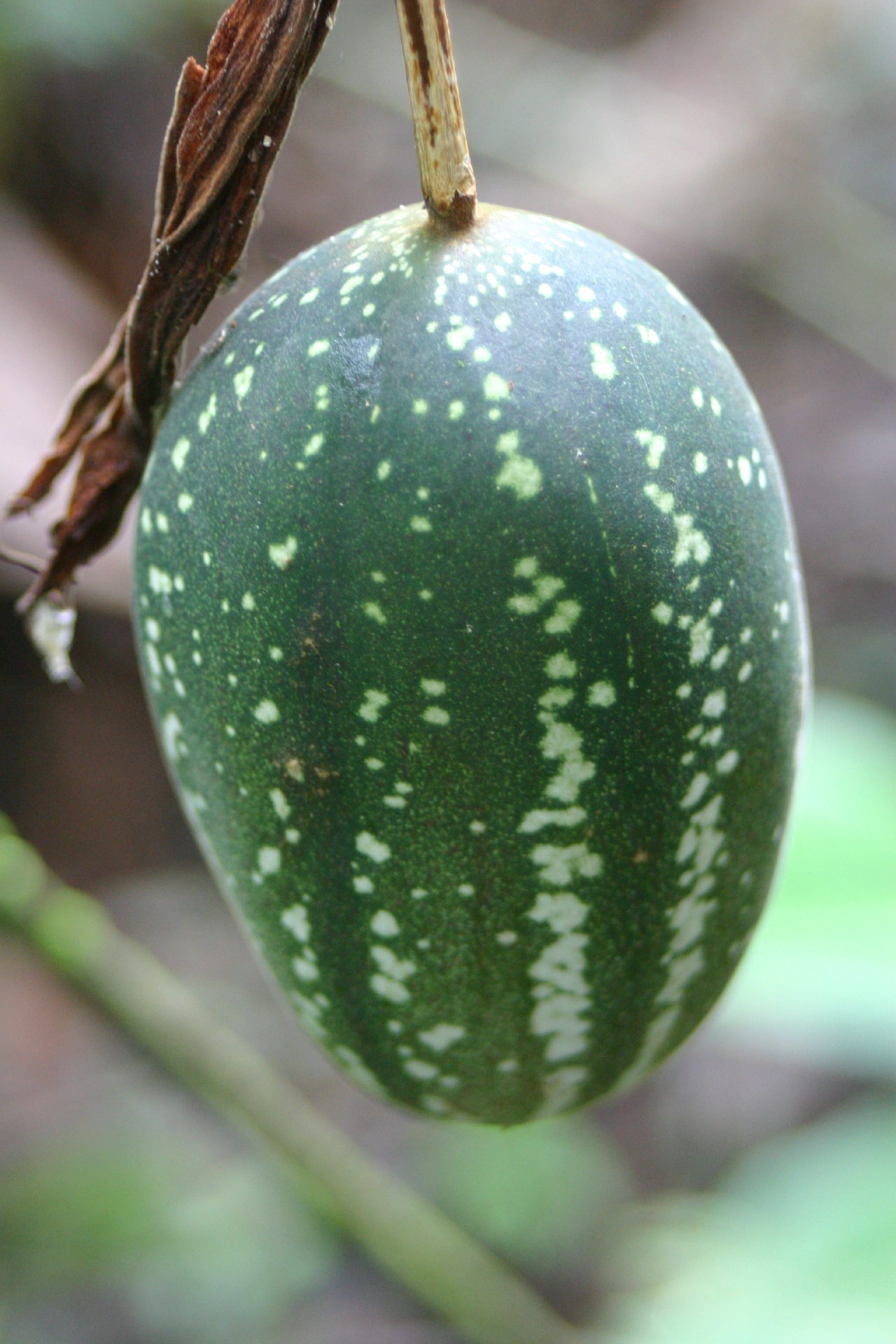
Unripe fruit
