= Red lacewing =

Red lacewing can refer to either of two butterfly species in the genus Cethosia:

- Cethosia biblis, from South and Southeast Asia
- Cethosia cydippe, from Australia, New Guinea and nearby islands
