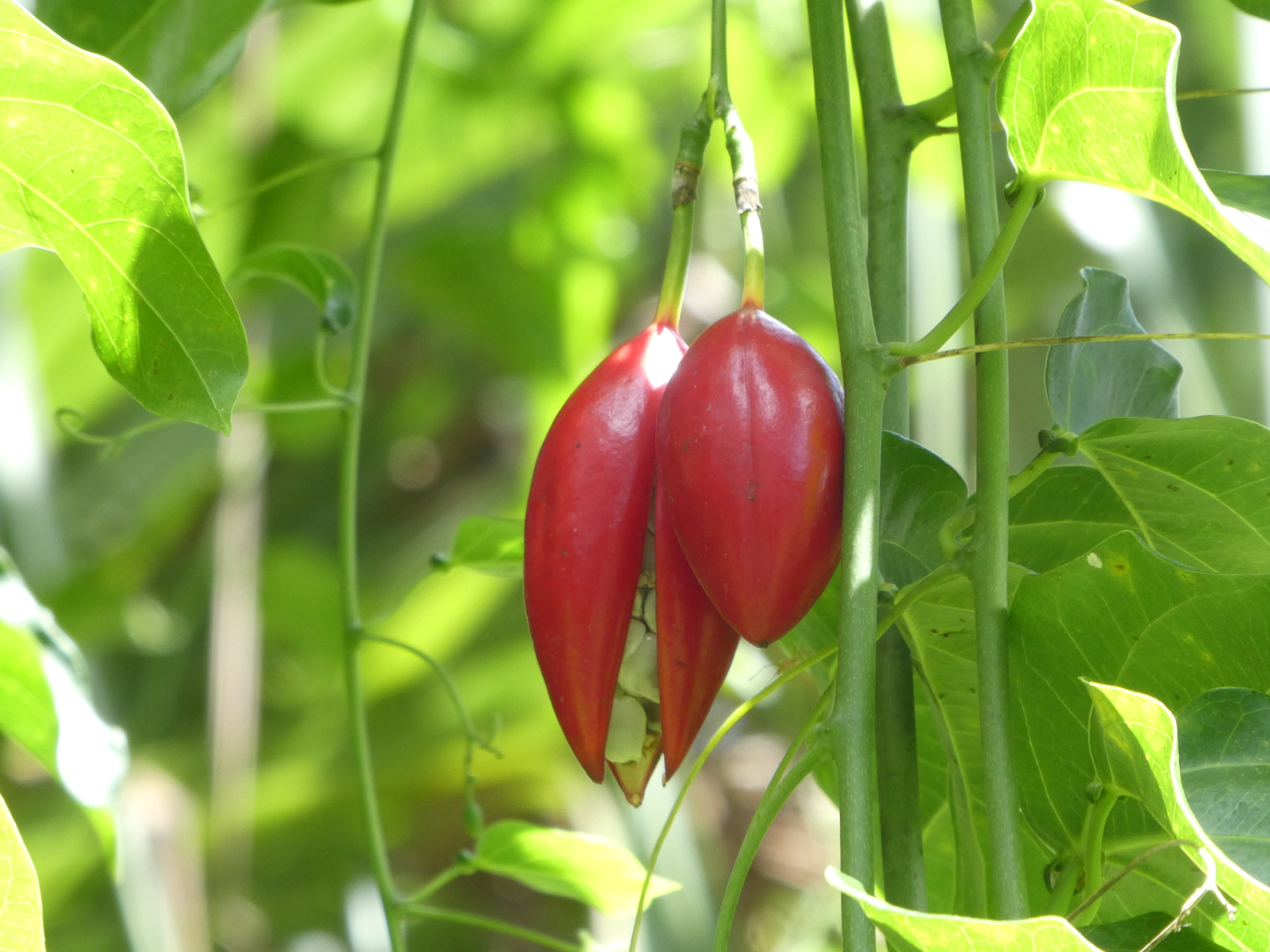

Conservation status
- Least Concern (NCA)

Scientific classification
- Kingdom: Plantae
- Clade: Tracheophytes
- Clade: Angiosperms
- Clade: Eudicots
- Clade: Rosids
- Order: Malpighiales
- Family: Passifloraceae
- Genus: Adenia
- Species: A. heterophylla

Binomial name
- Adenia heterophylla (Blume) Koord.
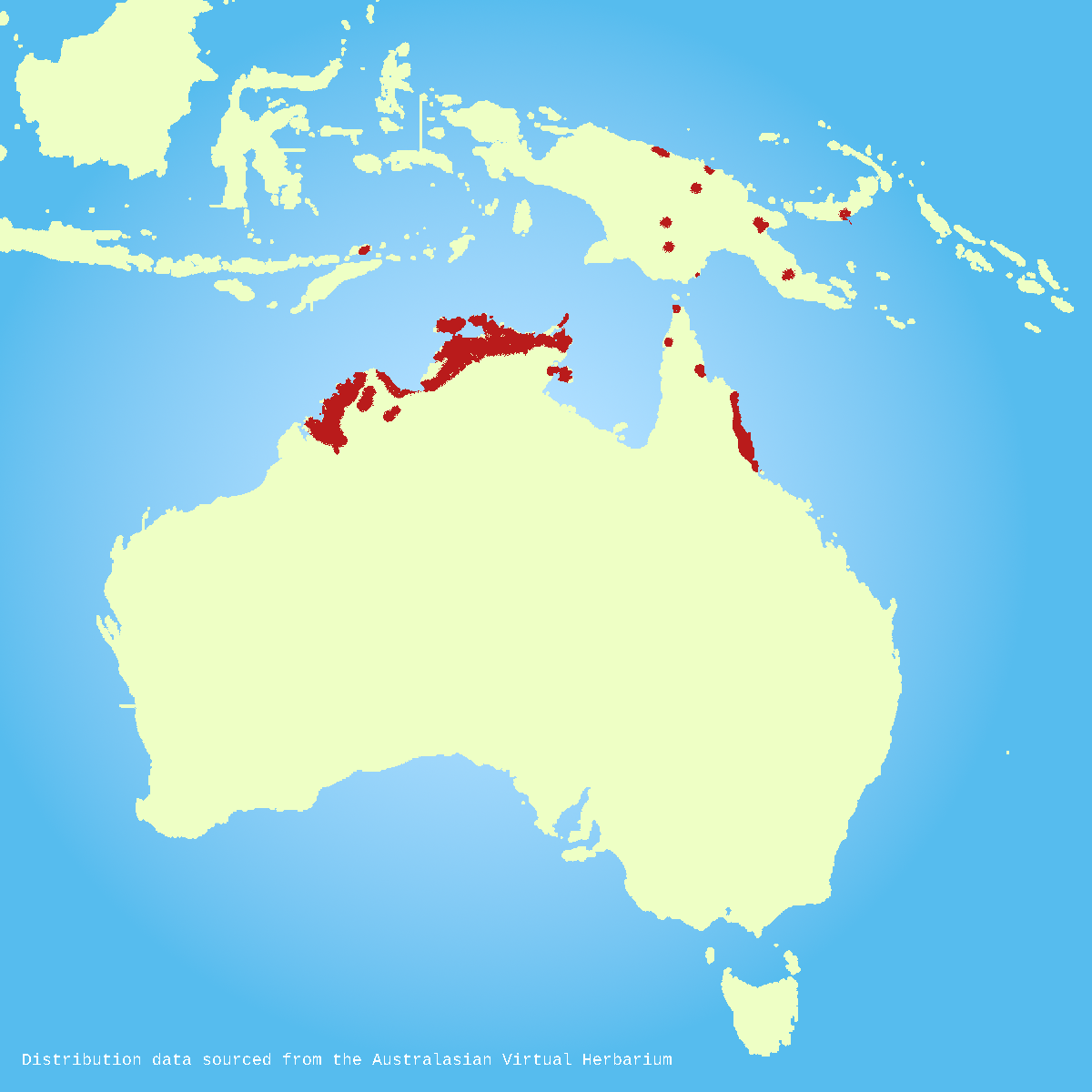
- Sightings of this species within Australia and New Guinea

Synonyms
- Microblepharis heterophylla (Blume) M.Roem.; Modecca heterophylla Blume

= Adenia heterophylla =

Lacewing vine

Species of flowering plant

Adenia heterophylla, commonly known in Australia as the lacewing vine, is a climbing plant in the family Passifloraceae. It has a broad distribution spanning the equator, from the south eastern corner of China, through Indochina and Malesia, to northern Australia. In Australia it serves as a food plant for larvae of the glasswing, red lacewing and cruiser butterflies.

== Taxonomy ==
First described as Modecca heterophylla by the German-Dutch botanist Carl Ludwig Blume in 1826, this species was reviewed by Dutch botanist Sijfert Hendrik Koorders who gave it the current binomial name, and published it in the work Exkursionsflora von Java, umfassend die Blütenpflanzen mit besonderer Berücksichtigung der im Hochgebirge wildwachsenden Arten im Auftrage des Niederländischen Kolonialministeriums in 1912.

=== Infraspecies ===
As of 18 November 2022, there are five infraspecies accepted by Plants of the World Online, as follows:

- Adenia heterophylla subsp. andamanica W.J.de Wilde
- Adenia heterophylla subsp. arcta (Craib) W.J.de Wilde
- Adenia heterophylla subsp. australis (R.Br. ex DC.) W.J.de Wilde
- Adenia heterophylla var. celebica (Koord.) W.J.de Wilde
- Adenia heterophylla subsp. heterophylla

== Distribution and habitat ==
The lacewing vine grows in a variety of tropical forest types including rainforest, beach forest, monsoon forest and vine thickets. It is native to the following areas: Andaman Islands, Bismarck Archipelago, Borneo, Cambodia, south east China, Hainan, Java, Laos, Lesser Sunda Islands, Maluku Islands, New Guinea, Nicobar Islands, the Northern Territory, Philippines, Queensland, Sulawesi, Sumatera, Taiwan, Thailand, Vietnam and Western Australia.

== Conservation ==
This species is listed by the Queensland Department of Environment and Science as least concern. As of 17 November 2022, it has not been assessed by the IUCN.

== Gallery ==
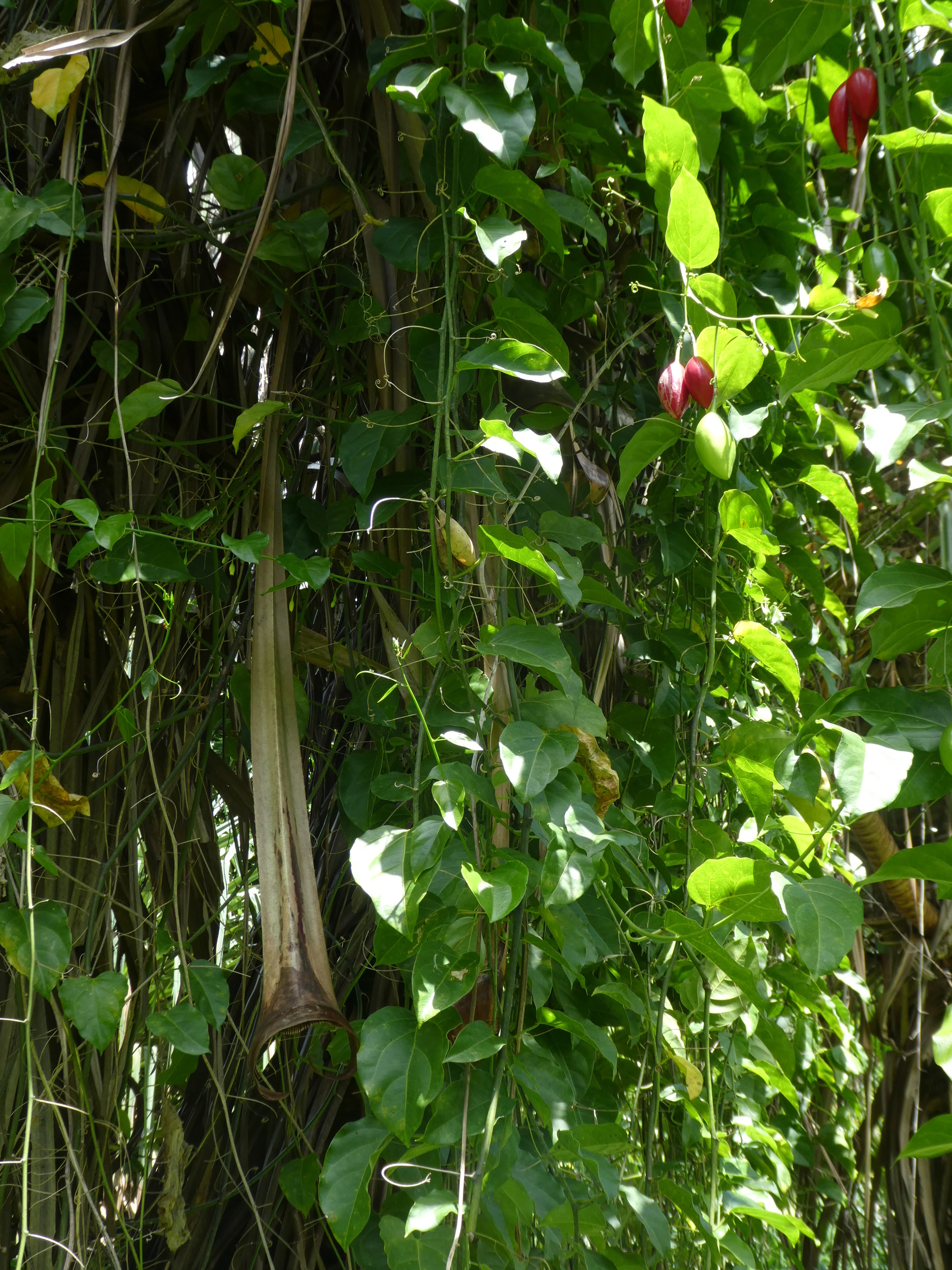

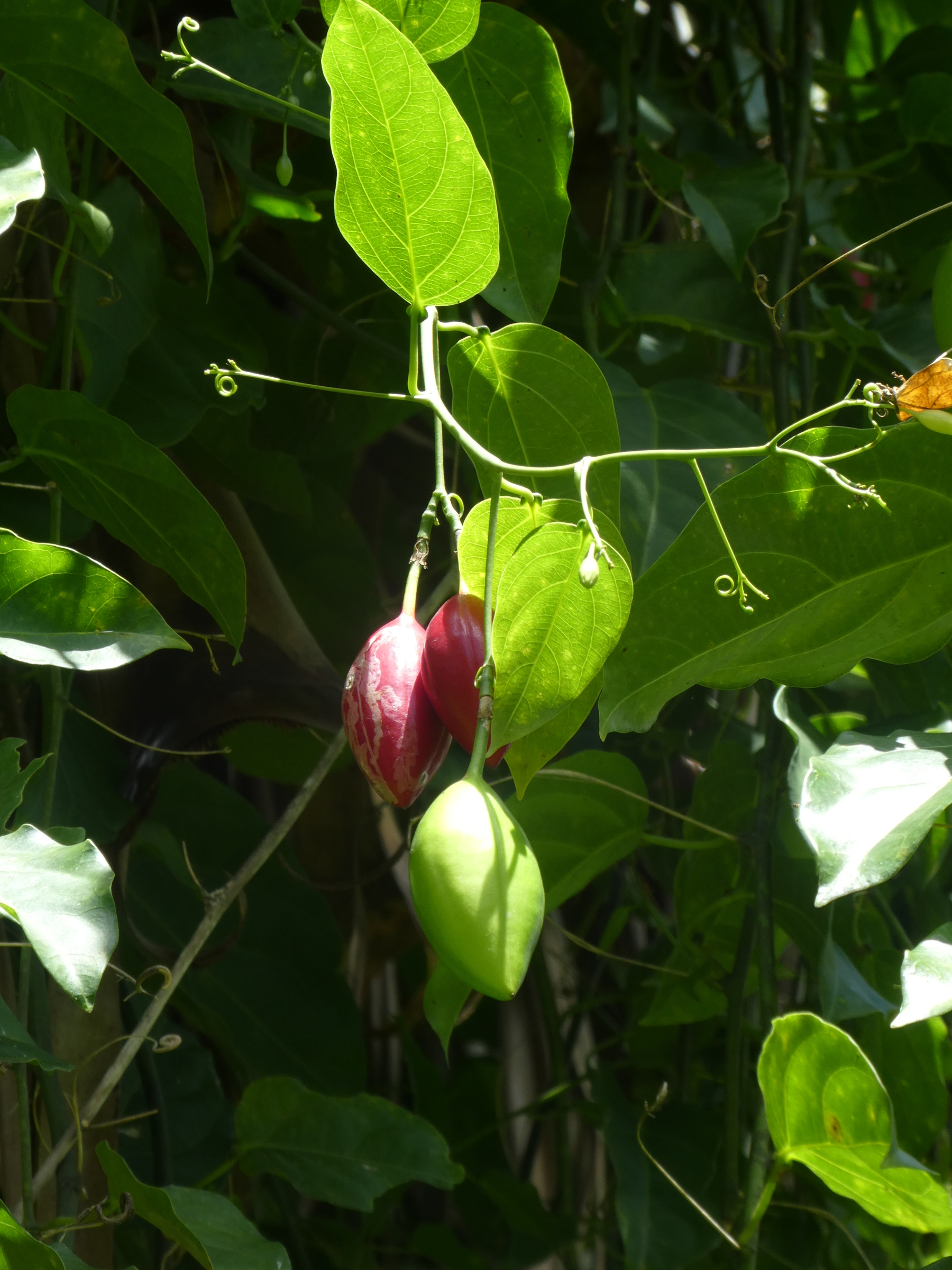

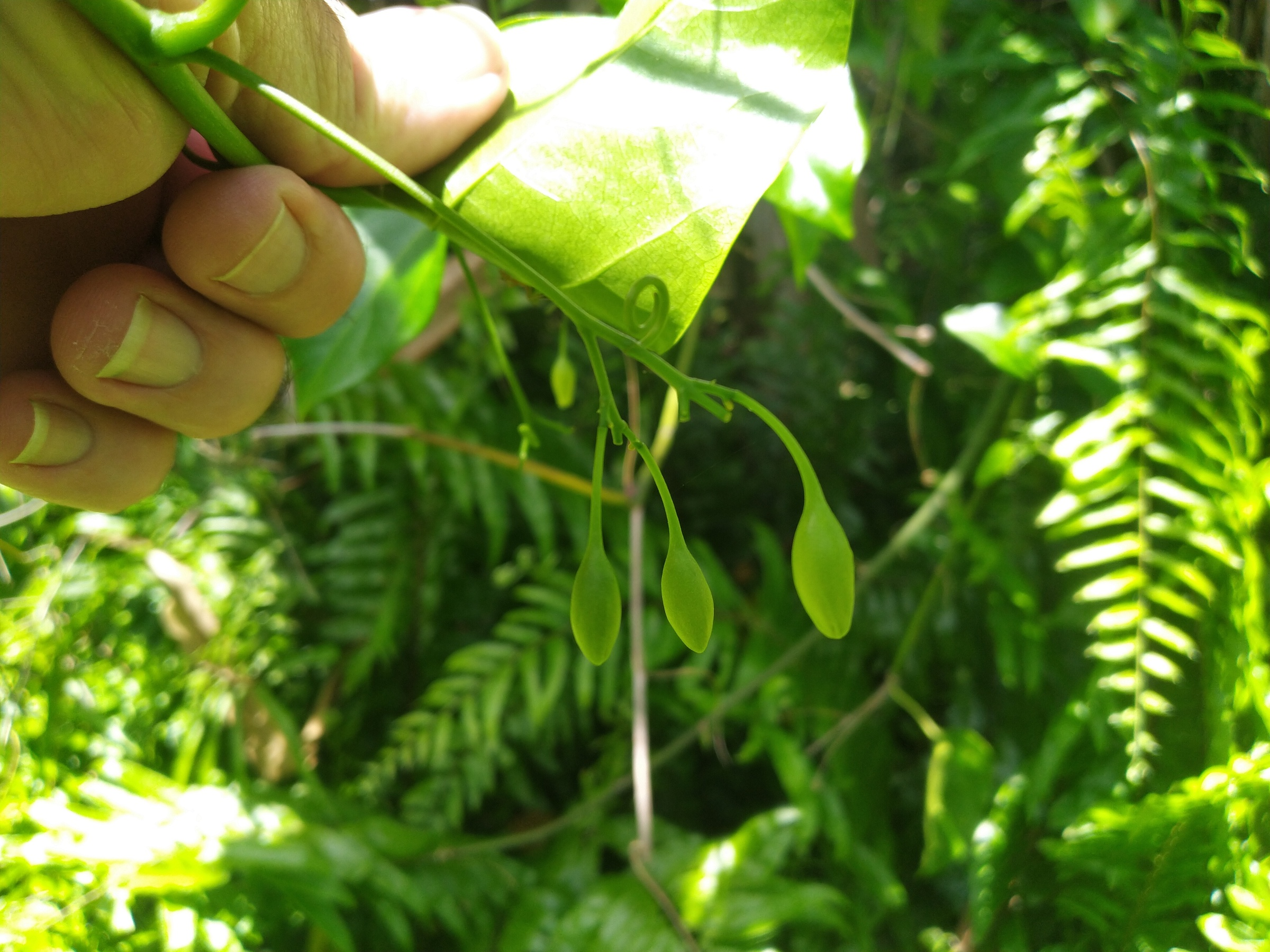

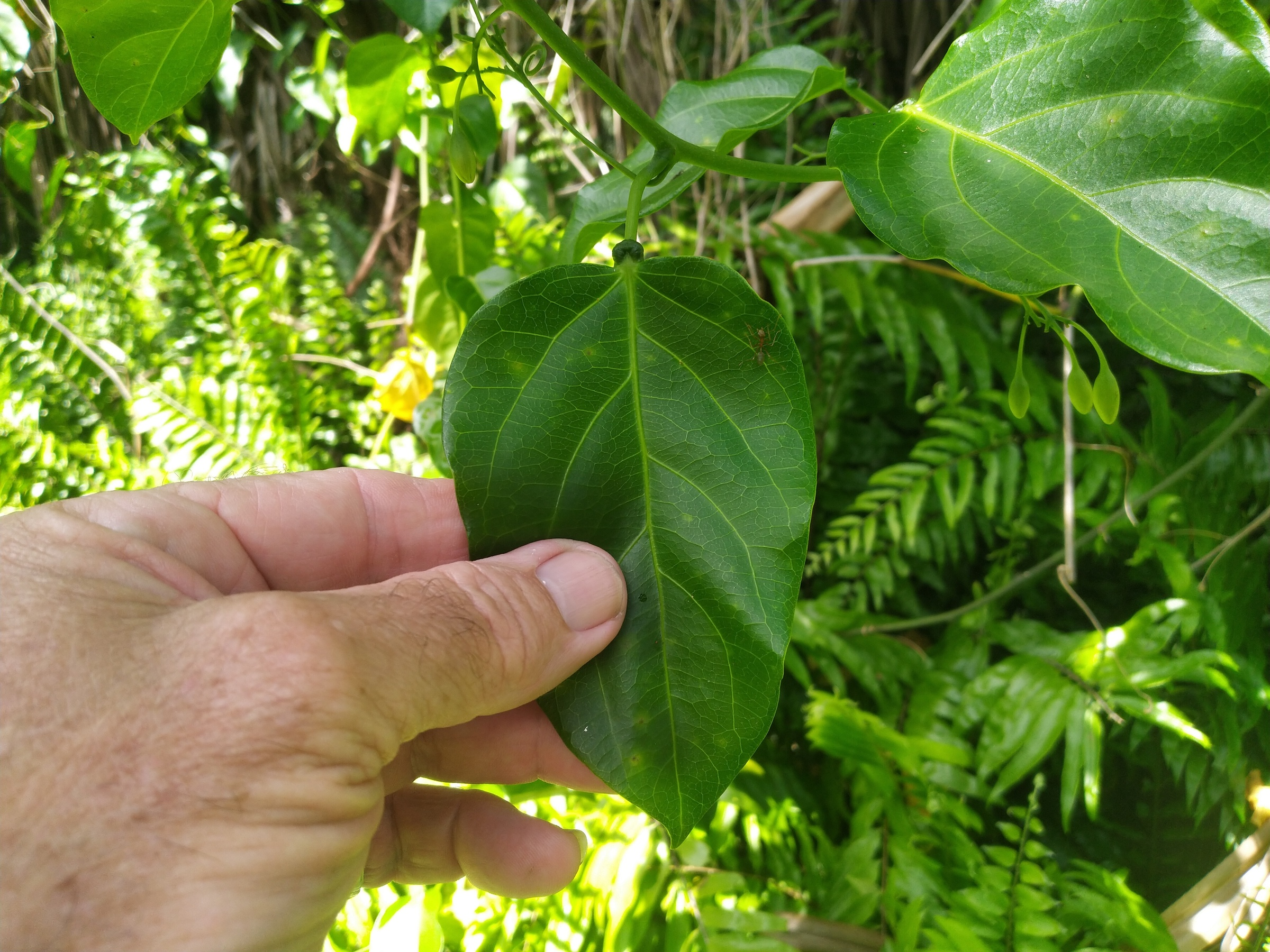

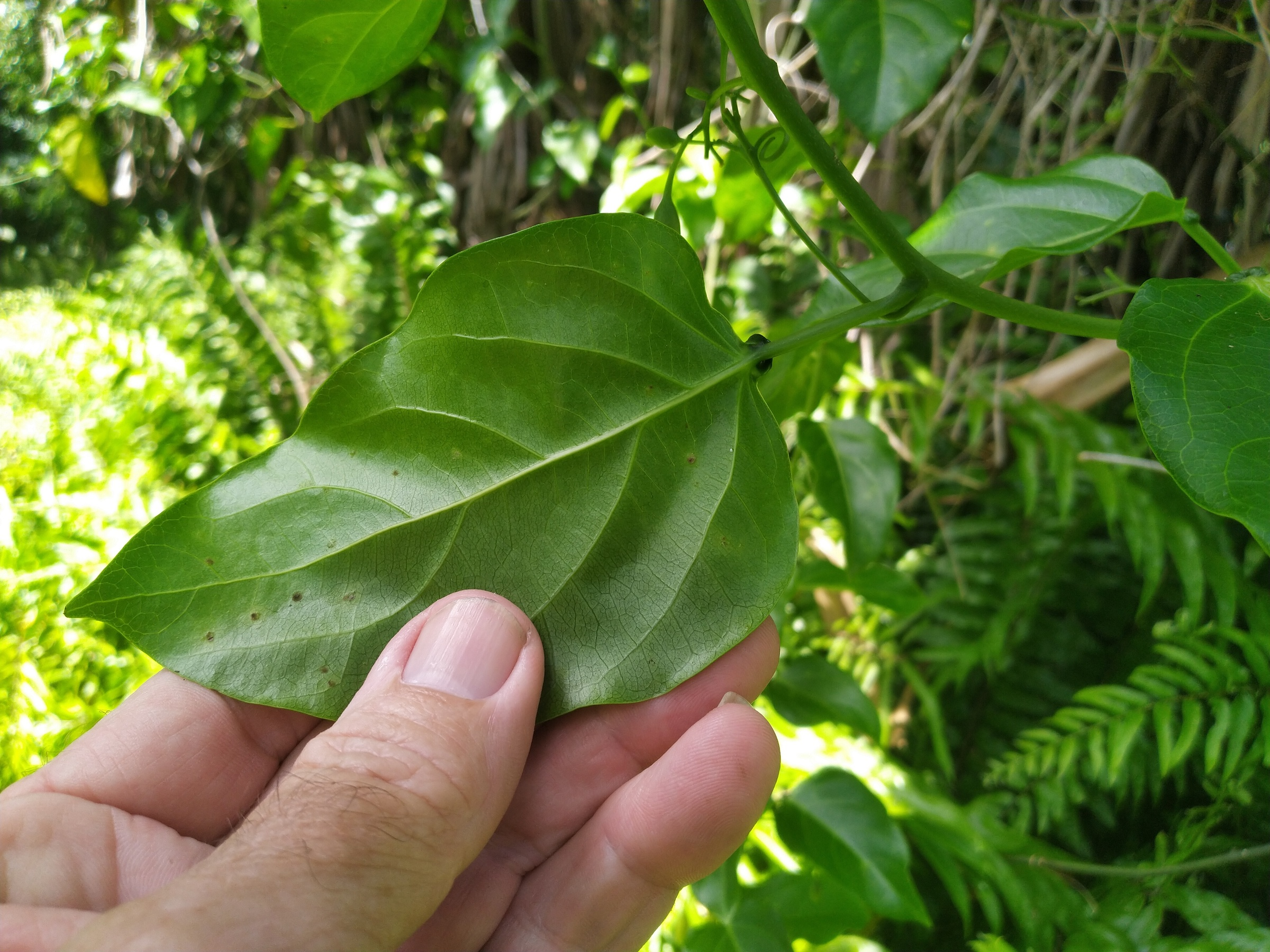

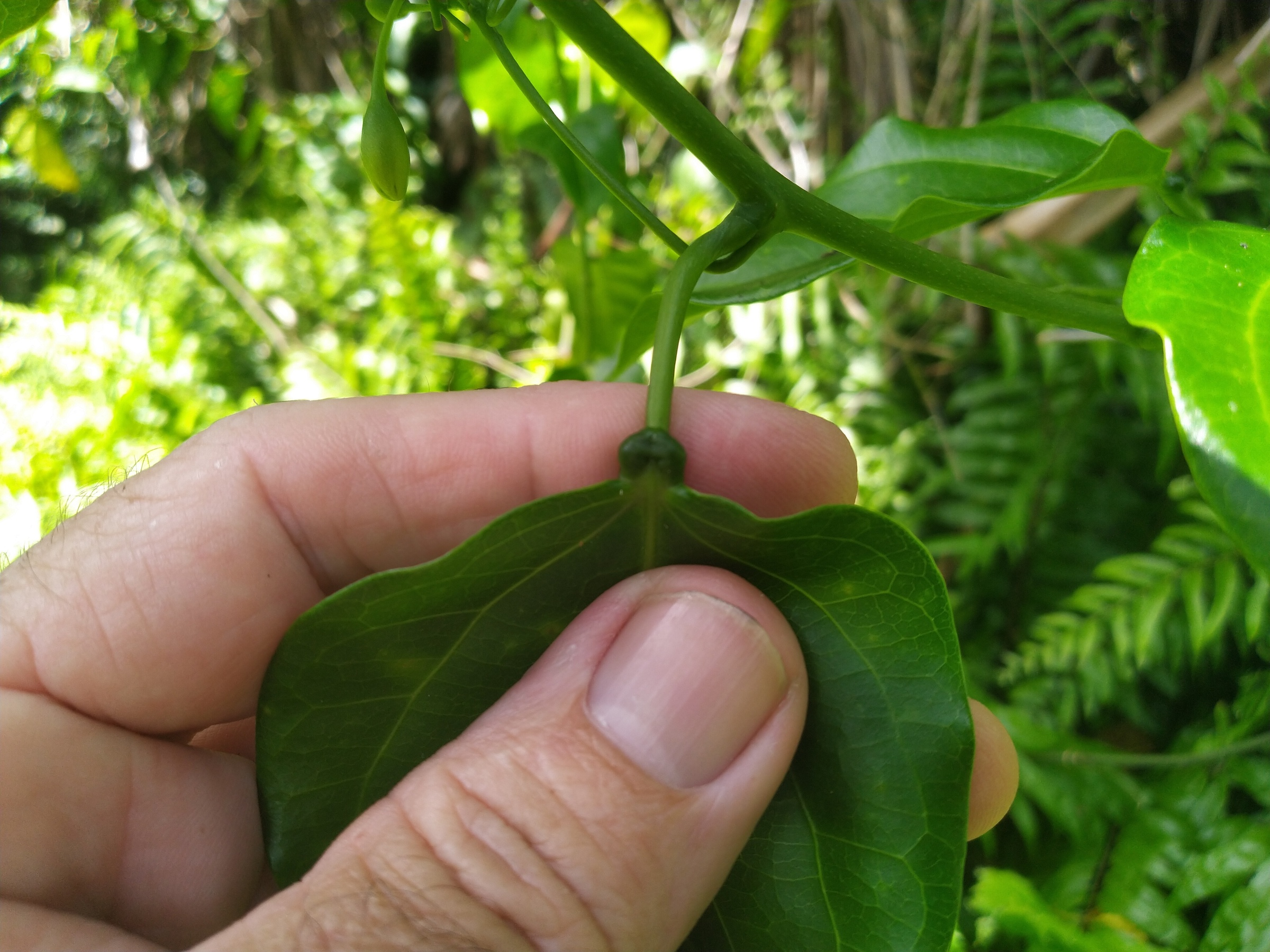
