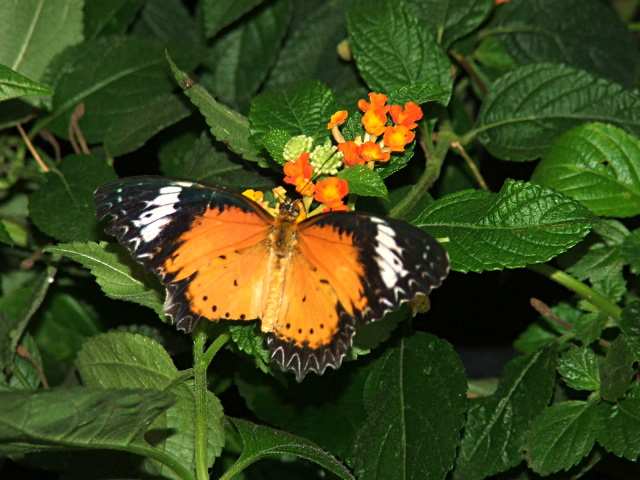

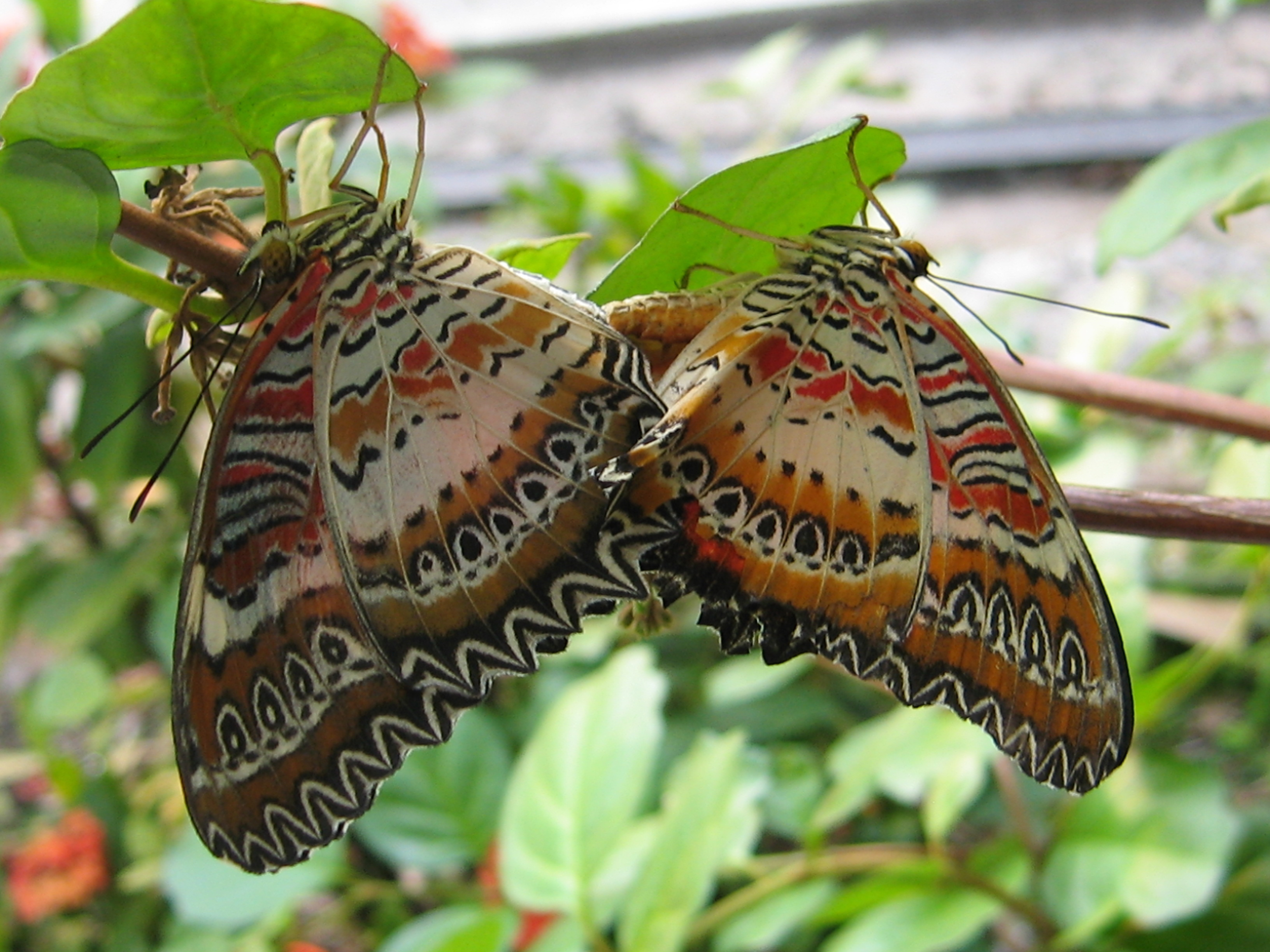
- Mating

Scientific classification
- Kingdom: Animalia
- Phylum: Arthropoda
- Clade: Pancrustacea
- Class: Insecta
- Order: Lepidoptera
- Family: Nymphalidae
- Genus: Cethosia
- Species: C. hypsea

Binomial name
- Cethosia hypsea Doubleday, [1847]

Synonyms
- Cethosia hypsina C. & R. Felder, [1867]; Cethosia pallaurea Hagen, 1898; Cethosia mindanensis festiva Fruhstorfer, 1909

= Cethosia hypsea =

Malay lacewing

Species of butterfly

Cethosia hypsea, the Malay lacewing, is a species of butterfly of the family Nymphalidae. It is found in from Myanmar to Indonesia and the Philippines.

The wingspan is about 80 mm.

The larvae feed on Adenia species. They are wine red and have long spines. They are also poisonous.

== Subspecies ==
- C. h. hypsea (Borneo)
- C. h. palawana Fruhstorfer (Palawan)
- C. h. munjava Fruhstorfer (western Java)
- C. h. fruhstorferi Stichel (eastern Java)
- C. h. hypsina C. & R. Felder, [1867] (southern Burma to Singapore)
- C. h. aeole Moore (north-eastern Sumatra)
- C. h. triocala Fruhstorfer (western Sumatra)
- C. h. pallaurea Hagen, 1898 (Mentawai)
- C. h. bankana Fruhstorfer (Bangka Island)
- C. h. batuensis Stichel (Batu Islands)
- C. h. mindanensis Felder (Philippines (Mindanao, Basilan))
- C. h. festiva Fruhstorfer, 1909 (Jolo (Sulu Archipelago))
- C. h. elioti Okubo, 1983
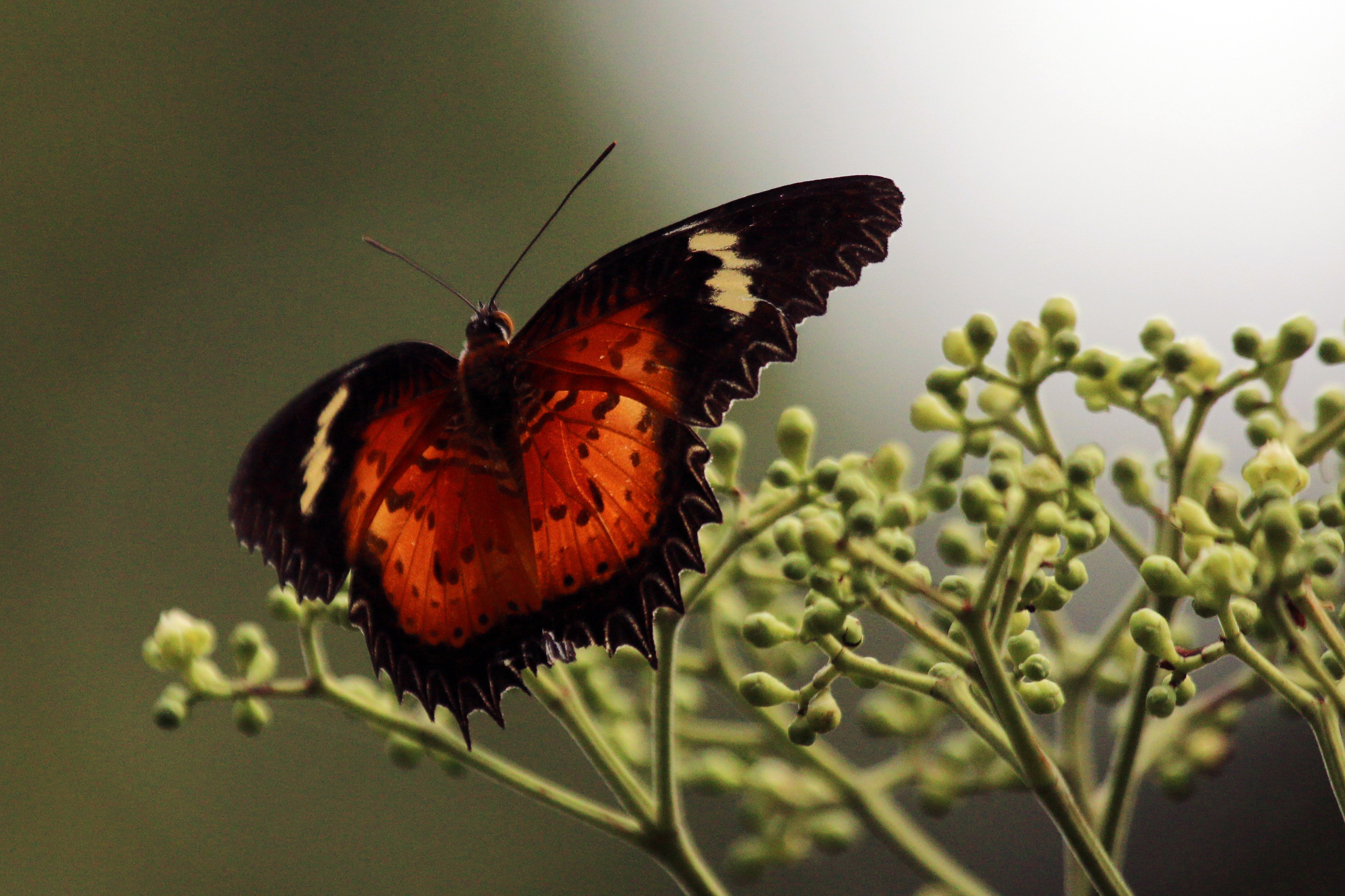
C. h. hypsina, Singapore

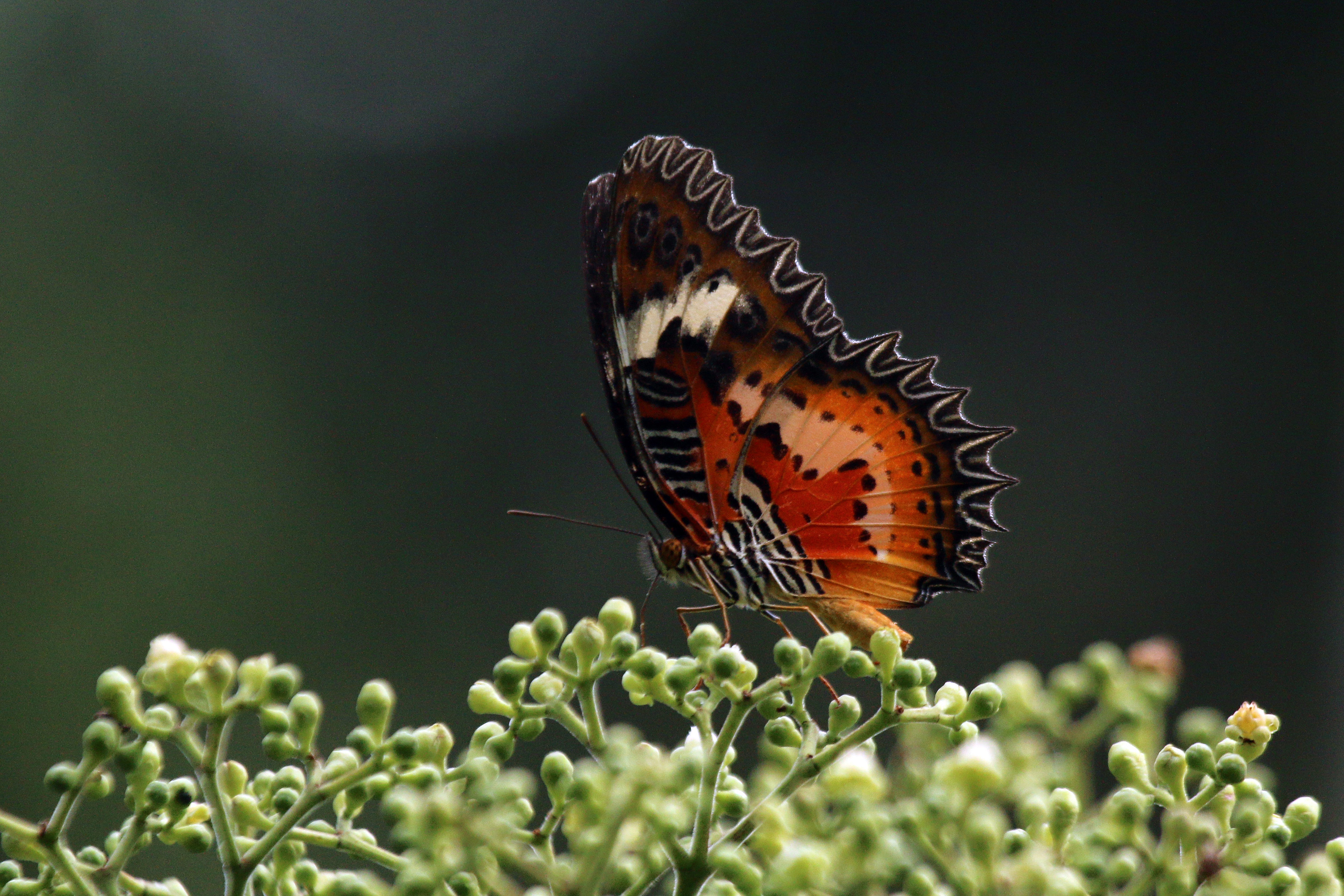
C. h. hypsina, Singapore
