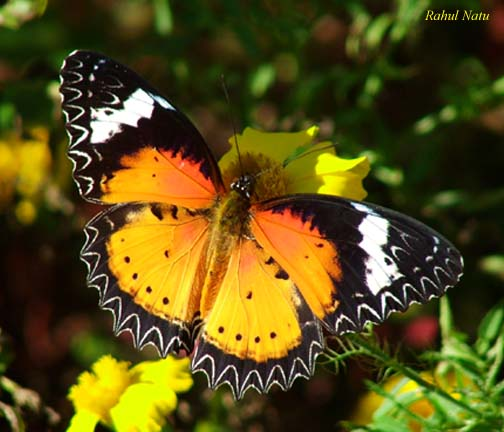
- Male
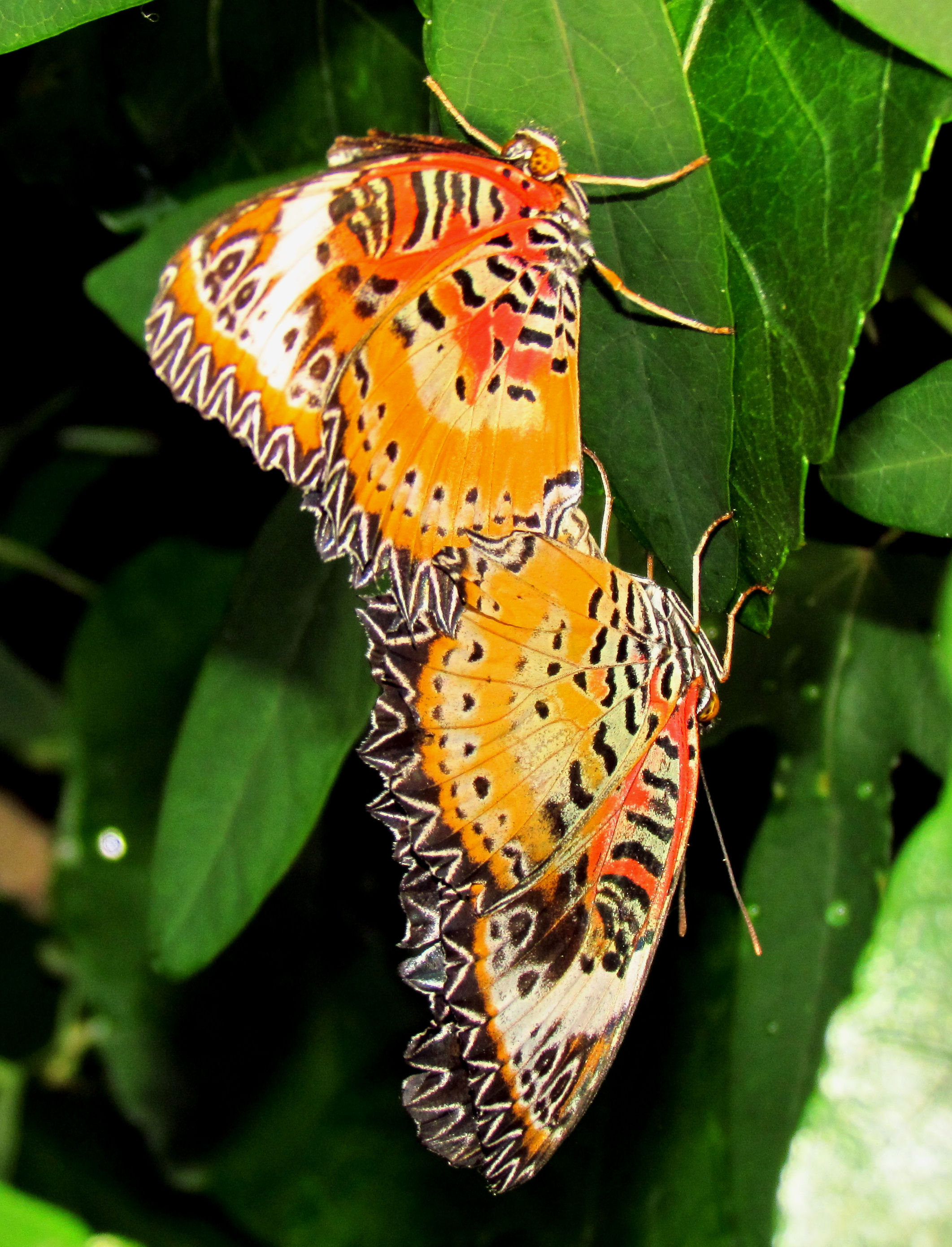
- Coupling

Scientific classification
- Domain: Eukaryota
- Kingdom: Animalia
- Phylum: Arthropoda
- Class: Insecta
- Order: Lepidoptera
- Family: Nymphalidae
- Genus: Cethosia
- Species: C. cyane

Binomial name
- Cethosia cyane (Drury, 1773)

Subspecies
- C. c. cyane; C. c. euanthes (Fruhstorfer, 1912)

= Cethosia cyane =

Leopard lacewing

Species of butterfly

Cethosia cyane, the leopard lacewing, is a species of heliconiine butterfly found from India to southern China (southern Yunnan), and Indochina. Its range has expanded in the last few decades, and its arrival in the southern part of the Malay Peninsula, including Singapore, is relatively recent.

== Description ==
=== Male ===
Upperside tawny, in fresh specimens a rich reddish tawny. Forewing: anterior and apical two-thirds black, the margin of this colour waved and irregular, following a line dividing the cell longitudinally and circling round to near the posterior angle; a short, broad, oblique, white bar beyond apex of cell, the veins crossing it and a spot in interspaces 3 and 4 black; a transverse indistinct row of small spots and a terminal series of V-shaped lunules white. Hindwing: three or four spots just beyond apex of cell, a subterminal row of spots and the termen broadly black, the last with a series of white lunules as on the forewing. Underside variegated with red, white, pale blue, ochraceous and black; the terminal margins of both wings broadly black with white lunules as on the upperside; in the middle of each lunule a short white streak from the margin; cilia alternately black and white. Forewing: the cell with transverse bands of red, blue and black; the base and disc below the cell red spotted with black, followed by pale blue, ochraceous and black; the white oblique band as on upperside, beyond it a transverse incomplete row of lanceolate white marks, with three black spots in each, followed by a subterminal ochraceous band paling inwardly. Hindwing: the base and cell pale blue and red, crossed by several broken incomplete black lines, then alternate bands of white and ochraceous, two of each; the outer white band narrow and marked in each interspace with three black spots arranged as a triangle. Antennae, head and thorax dusky brown; abdomen above tawny, beneath white.

=== Female ===
Similar to the male in markings, but the tawny ground colour replaced by pale greenish white, somewhat brownish on the upperside of forewing, the extent of black on this wing larger. Underside with all the markings paler than in the male the red at the base of the wings replaced by brownish yellow on the fore, white on the hindwing. Antennae, head and thorax dusky brown; abdomen dusky above, white beneath.

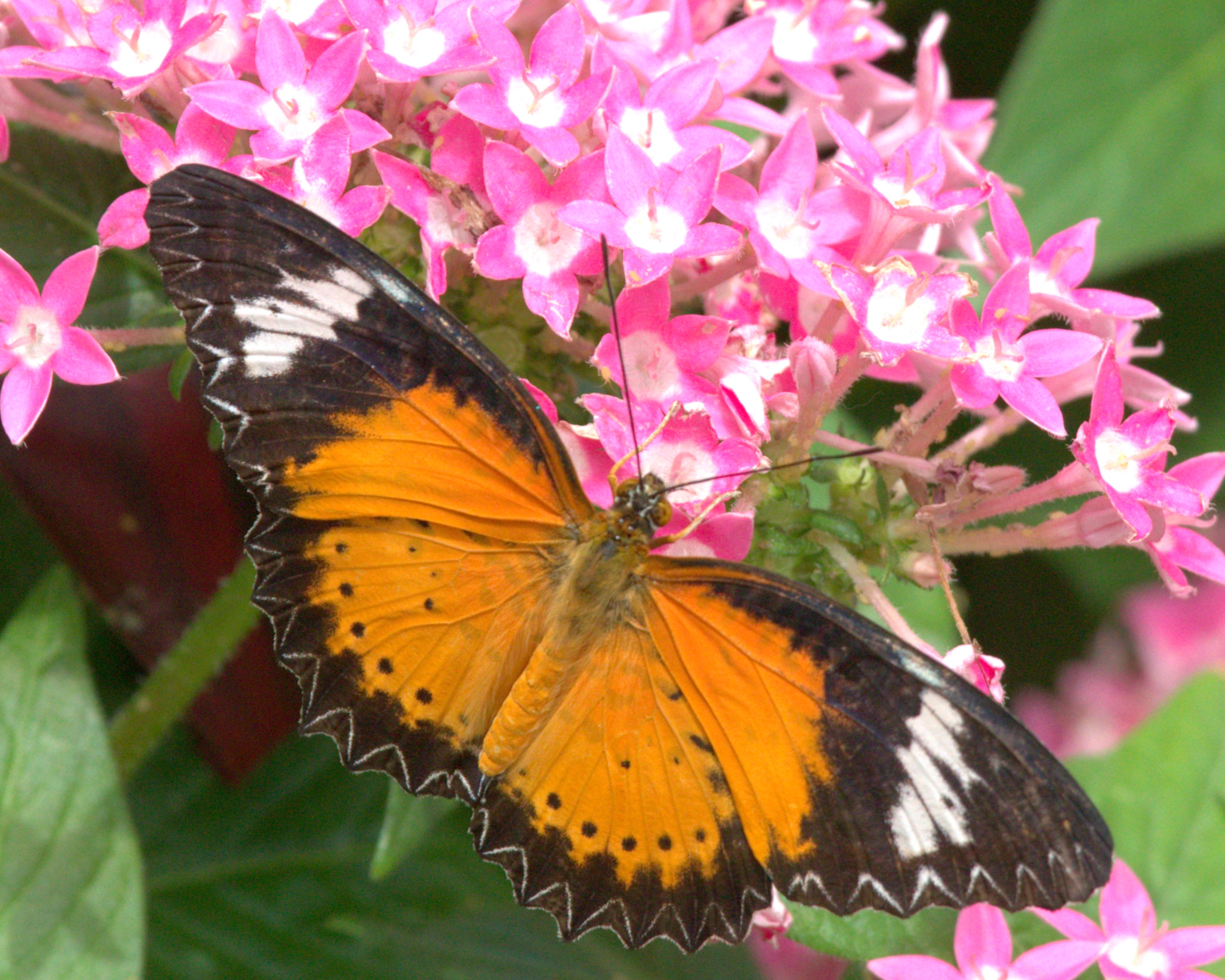
Male dorsal

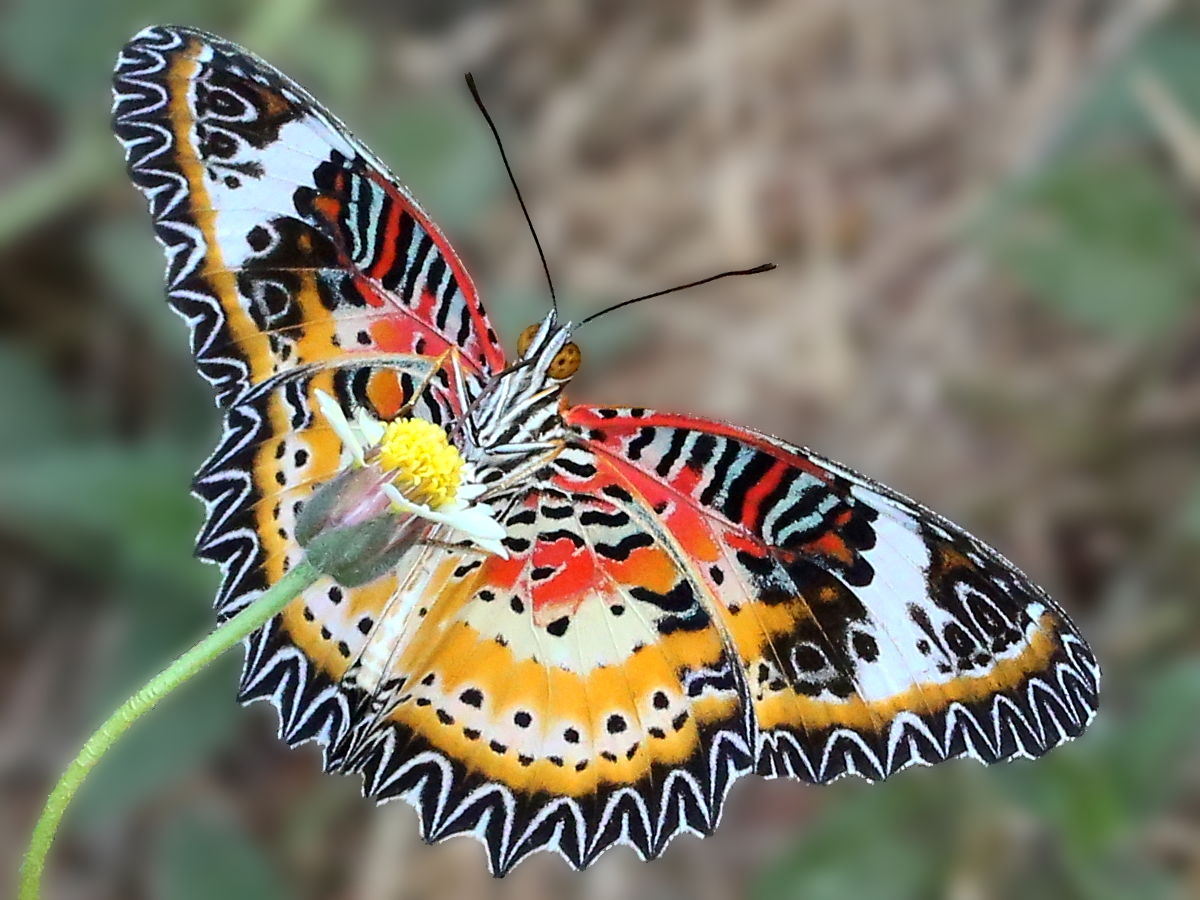
Male ventral Angkor Wat, Cambodia

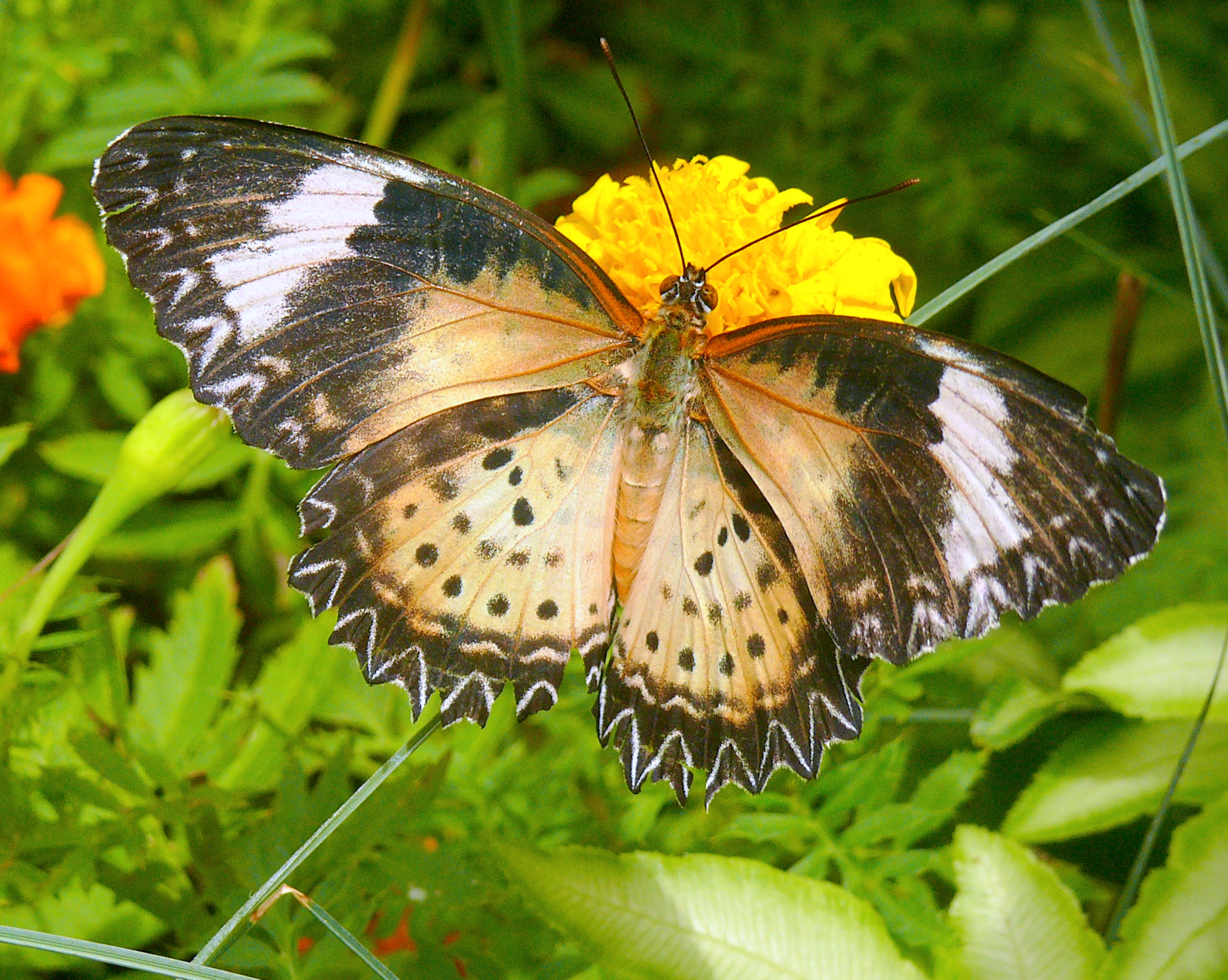
Female

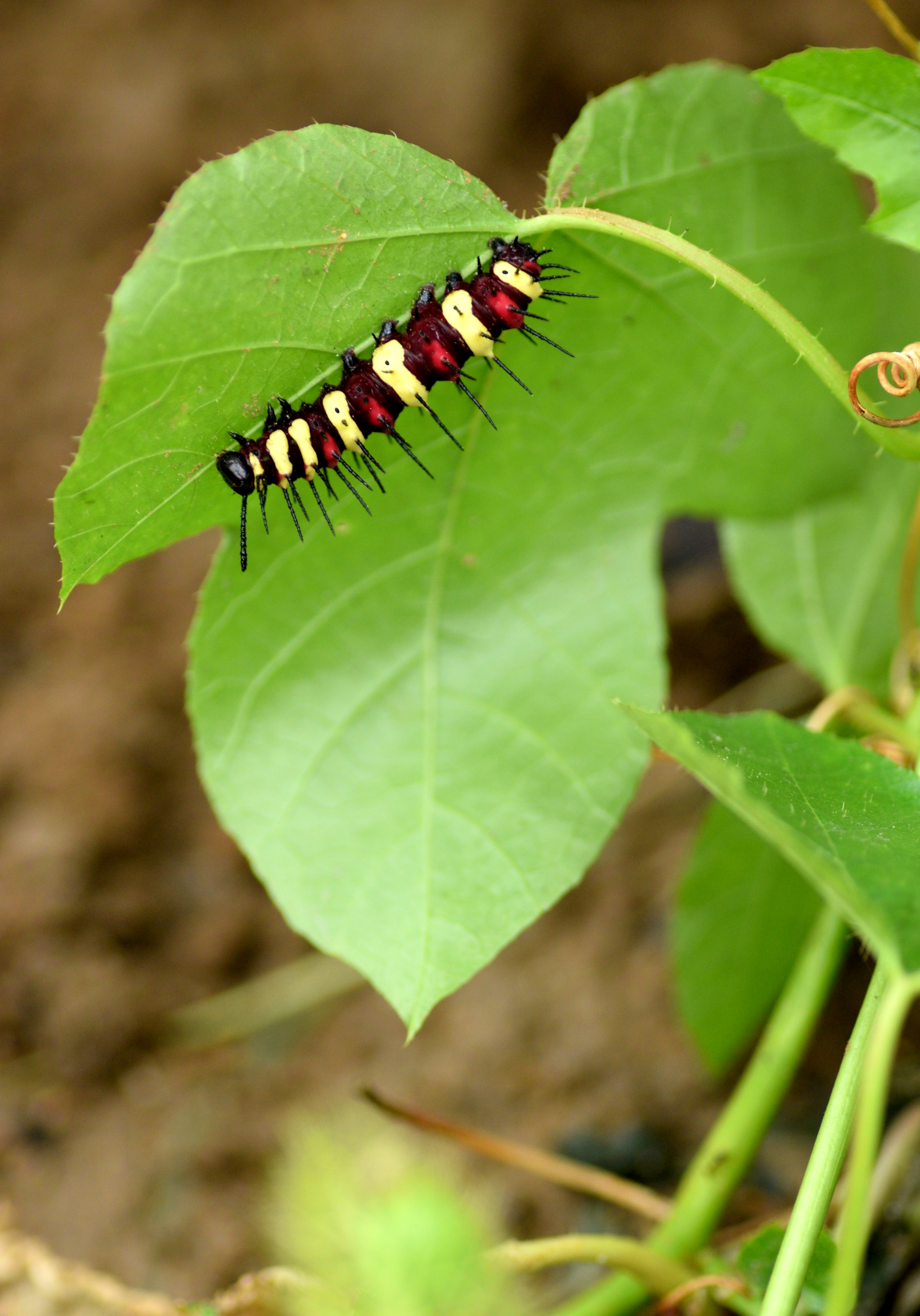
Caterpillar

== Larva ==
"Cylindrical, purplish-black segments with alternate yellow and crimson bands. Head armed with two long spines, segments with dorsal and lateral rows of fine spines. Feeds on Passiflora, July. (Described from drawing by Major C. H. E. Adamson.)." (Frederic Moore)
