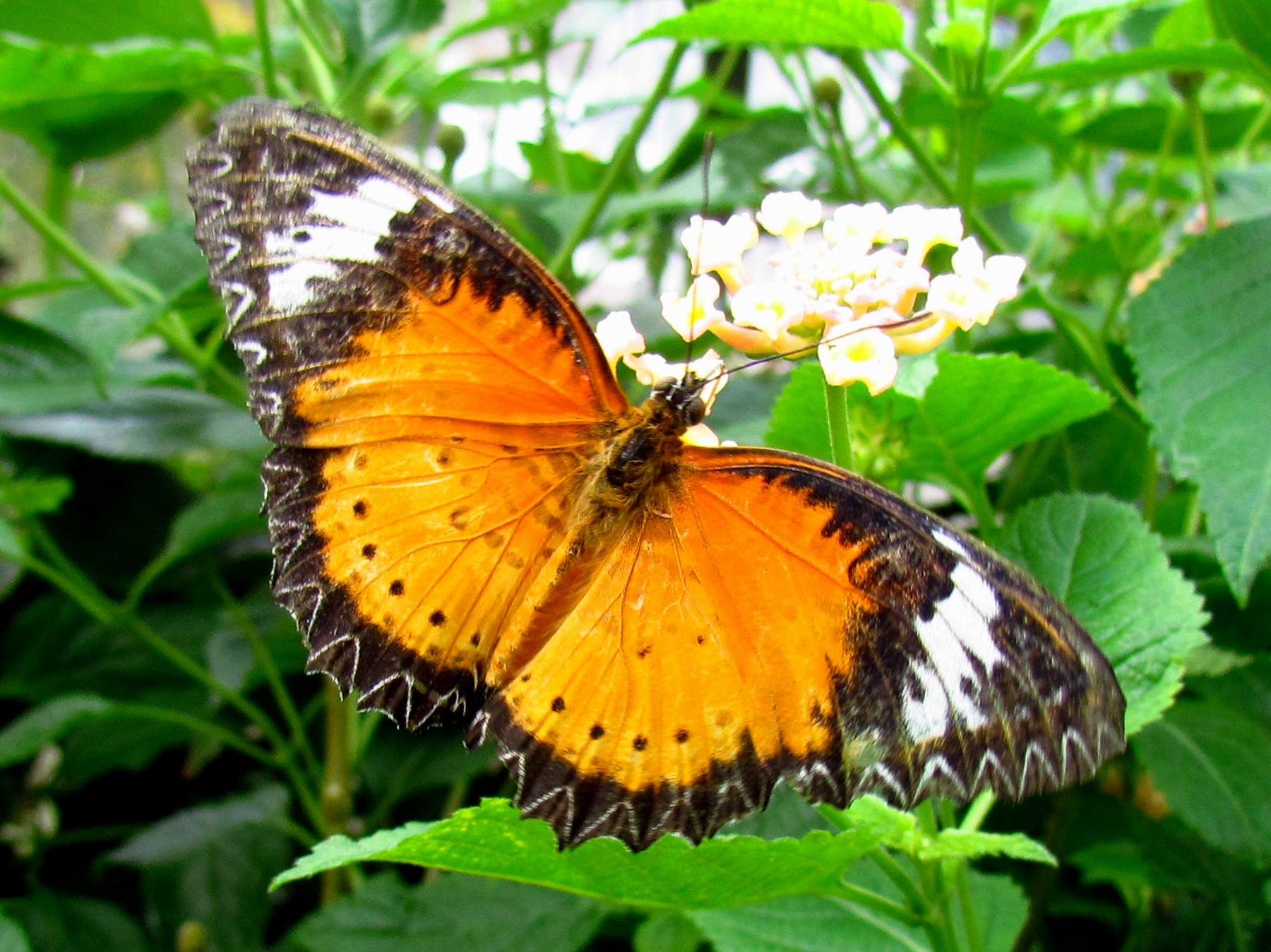

Scientific classification
- Kingdom: Animalia
- Phylum: Arthropoda
- Clade: Pancrustacea
- Class: Insecta
- Order: Lepidoptera
- Family: Nymphalidae
- Genus: Cethosia
- Species: C. penthesilea

Binomial name
- Cethosia penthesilea (Cramer, [1777])

Subspecies
- See text

Synonyms
- Eugramma paksha

= Cethosia penthesilea =

Orange lacewing

Species of butterfly

Cethosia penthesilea, the orange lacewing, is a species of heliconiine butterfly found in Southeast Asia, as well as the Australia's Northern Territory.

Larval food: Lacewing Vine (Adenia heterophylla).

== Subspecies ==
- C. p. methypsea (Butler, 1879) – plain lacewing
- C. p. paksha (Fruhstorfer, 1905) – orange lacewing
- C. p. penthesilea (Cramer, [1777])
