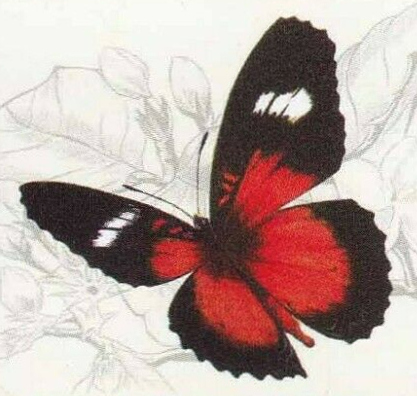
- Cethosia luzonica on a 2019 stamp sheet of the Philippines
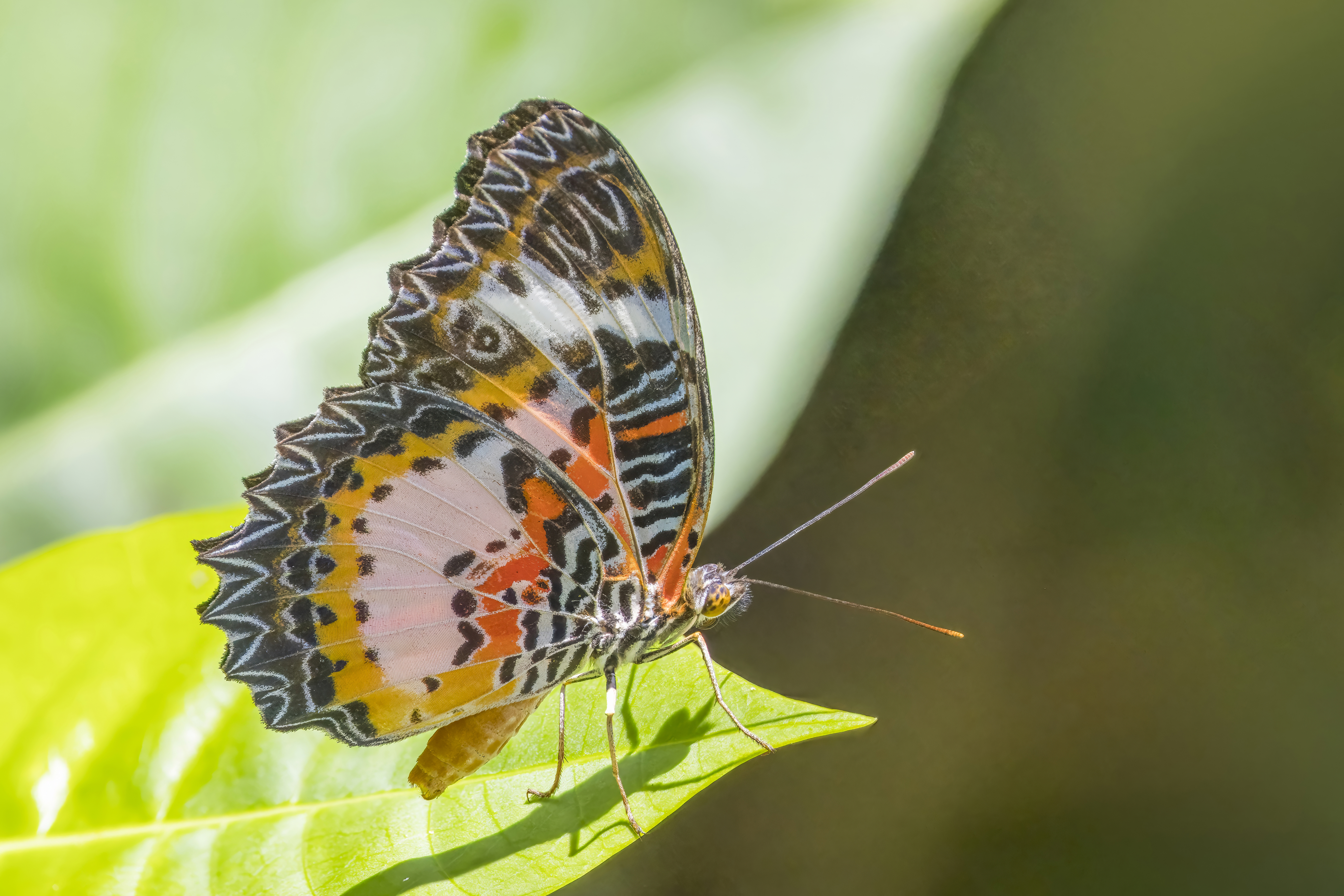
- C. l. boholica, Bohol, the Philippines

Scientific classification
- Kingdom: Animalia
- Phylum: Arthropoda
- Clade: Pancrustacea
- Class: Insecta
- Order: Lepidoptera
- Family: Nymphalidae
- Genus: Cethosia
- Species: C. luzonica

Binomial name
- Cethosia luzonica C. & R. Felder, 1863

Synonyms
- Cethosia luzonica var. pariana Semper, 1888; Cethosia luzonica var. boholica Semper, 1888; Cethosia luzonica var. magindanica Semper, 1888

= Cethosia luzonica =

Species of butterfly

Cethosia luzonica , the Luzon lacewing, is a species of heliconiine butterfly endemic to the Philippines.

== Subspecies ==
- Cethosia luzonica luzonica (Philippines: Luzon)
- Cethosia luzonica pariana Semper, 1888 (Philippines: Panay, Negros, Guimaras)
- Cethosia luzonica. boholica Semper, 1888 (Philippines: Bohol, Leyte, Samar, Cebu, Panaon)
- Cethosia luzonica magindanica Semper, 1888 (Philippines: Mindanao)
