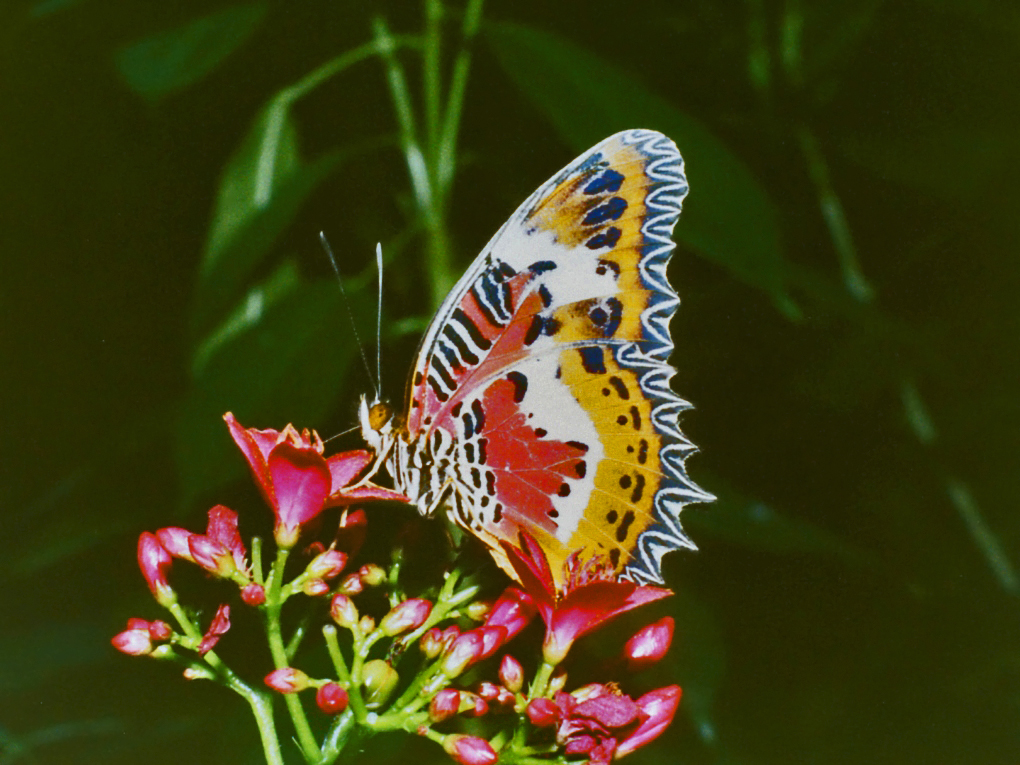

Scientific classification
- Kingdom: Animalia
- Phylum: Arthropoda
- Class: Insecta
- Order: Lepidoptera
- Family: Nymphalidae
- Genus: Cethosia
- Species: C. hypsea
- Subspecies: C. h. hypsina

Trinomial name
- Cethosia hypsea hypsina C. & R. Felder, [1867]

= Cethosia hypsea hypsina =

Subspecies of butterfly

Cethosia hypsea hypsina, the Malay lacewing, is a subspecies of Cethosia hypsea, a butterfly of the genus Cethosia belonging to the family Nymphalidae.

== Description ==
The wingspan is about 80 mm. The uppersides of the forewings are black with a broad white transverse band and an orange-red basal area. In the female on each upperside forewing the basal orange area has also a white patch. In both sexes the outer margins of both wings have scalloped black margins.

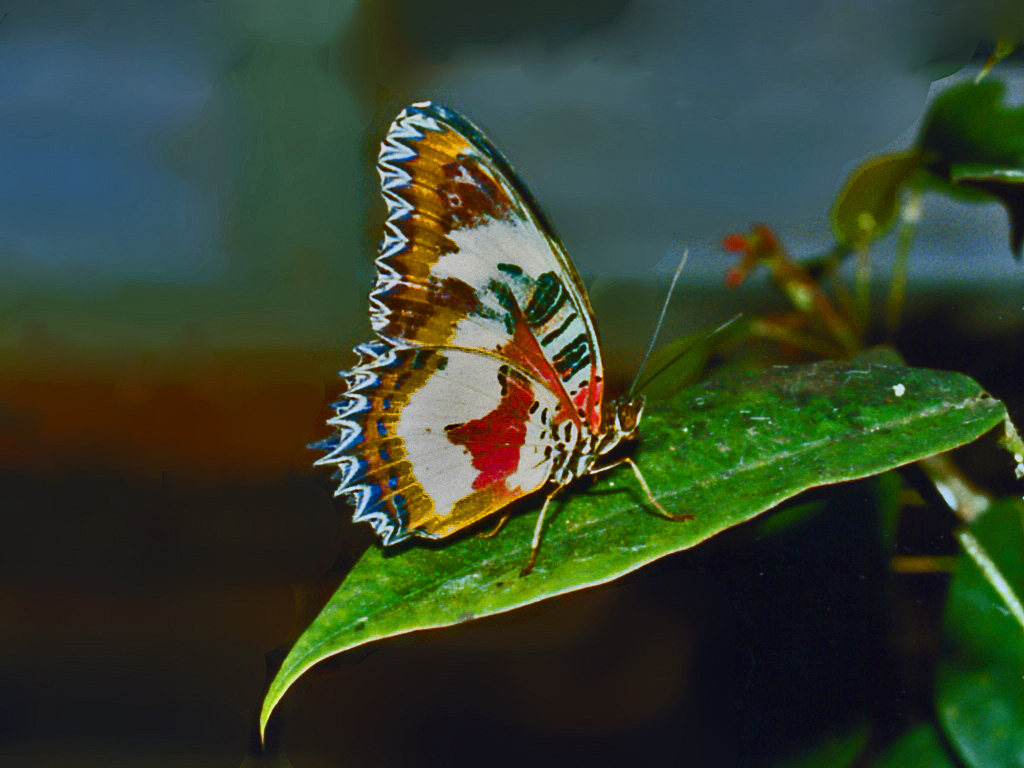
Ventral view of Cethosia hypsea hypsina

The undersides of the wings are orange red with large white bands and several black or pale blue stripes. The edges of the undersides of the wings are deeply scalloped by white markings.

The larvae mainly feed on Adenia macrophylla var. singaporeana (Passifloraceae). The caterpillars are wine red and have long spines. They are also poisonous.

== Distribution ==
This butterfly is present from southern Burma to Singapore.

== Habitat ==
Cethosia hypsea hypsina can be found in forested areas and in nature reserves.
