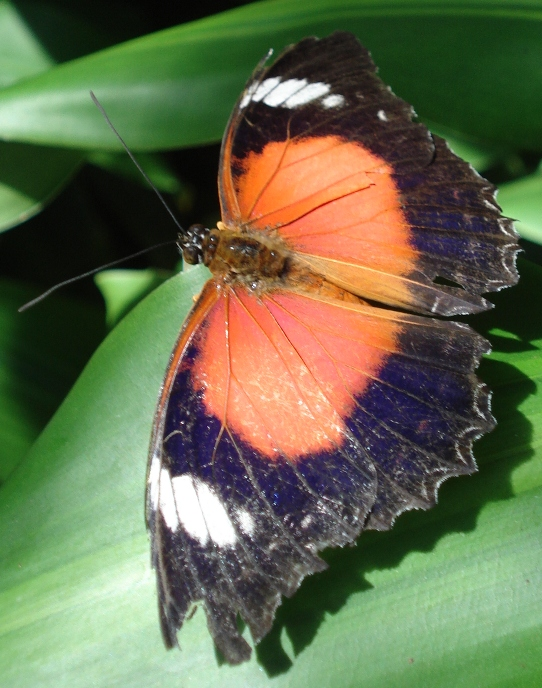
- Cethosia cydippe chrysippe

Scientific classification
- Kingdom: Animalia
- Phylum: Arthropoda
- Class: Insecta
- Order: Lepidoptera
- Family: Nymphalidae
- Genus: Cethosia
- Species: C. cydippe

Binomial name
- Cethosia cydippe (Linnaeus, 1767)

Subspecies
- See text

Synonyms
- Papilio cydippe Linnaeus, 1767; Cethosia chrysonoe Godart, 1819; Papilio ino Cramer; Papilio chrysippe Fabricius, 1775; Cethosia imperialis Butler, 1876; Cethosia insulata Butler, 1873; Cethosia cydippe coronilla Fruhstorfer, 1909; Cethosia cydippe praestabilis Fruhstorfer, 1909; Cethosia cydippe claudilla Fruhstorfer, 1912

= Cethosia cydippe =

Eastern red lacewing

Species of butterfly

Cethosia cydippe, the eastern red lacewing, is a species of butterfly from Australia, New Guinea and nearby islands. The Australian subspecies, C. c. chrysippe, is known as the red lacewing butterfly.

== Description ==
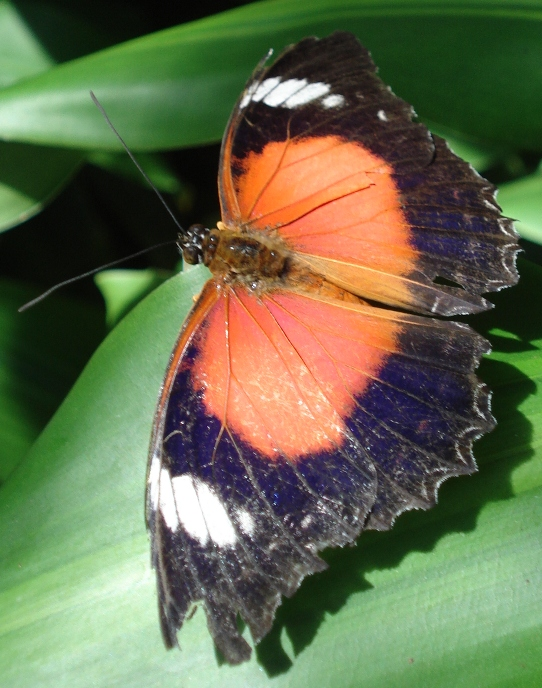
Cethosia cydippe spp (aka red lacewing)

The imagines have scarlet wings with thick black edges and a diagonal white patch on the forewings. The underside is orange with similar white patches and lines of black spots, each with a white outline. The wingspan is around 8 centimetres (3.1 in).

== Ecology and life cycle ==
Pale yellow eggs are laid in groups of 50 on the host plant. The caterpillars which hatch from those eggs are herbivorous, feeding on vines in the family Passifloraceae, including Adenia heterophylla (lacewing vine) and Passiflora aurantioides (Queensland passion-fruit). They are black with yellow bands and long black hairs, and form congregations on the host plants. The pupae are brown and spiky with black and gold markings, hang from a cremaster and resemble a dead leaf.

== Taxonomy and distribution ==
It was described by Carl Linnaeus in the 1767 12th edition of Systema Naturae as Papilio cydippe. He had previously described a European species, now classified as Argynnis, under that name in Fauna Svecica. Centuria Insectorum. Although the Principle of Priority in zoological nomenclature would normally require the oldest name to be used, the 1767 name has been conserved against any earlier homonyms. Linnaeus quoted a type locality of India, but this has been interpreted as a reference to Indonesia, and the type locality is now Ambon.

A number of subspecies are recognised, including C. c. cydippe (Linnaeus, 1767) and C. c. chrysippe (Fabricius, 1775). C. c. cydippe occurs in the Aru Islands, the Kai Islands and Maluku in Indonesia, and on New Guinea, both in the Indonesian Irian Jaya and in Papua New Guinea. C. c. chrysippe was first described by Johan Christian Fabricius in his Systema Entomologiae in 1775, as Papilio chrysippe, with a type locality of Cooktown, Queensland. The subspecies is endemic to Queensland, where it is found in the northern Gulf Country and north-east coastal region.

All recognised subspecies listed alphabetically:

- C. c. alkmene Fruhstorfer, 1902 (D'Etrecasteaux Archipelago)
- C. c. antoni Kawai, 1996 (Tanimbar Island)
- C. c. bernsteini C. & R. Felder, [1867] (Bachan, Halmahera, Morotai)
- C. c. cenchrites Fruhstorfer, 1909 (New Guinea)
- C. c. chrysippe (Fabricius, 1775) (Cape York)
- C. c. cleanthis Fruhstorfer, 1902 (Trobriand Islands)
- C. c. cydalima C. & R. Felder, [1867] (Aru, Goram)
- C. c. cydippe (Linnaeus, 1767) (Serang, Ambon, Saparua)
- C. c. cyrene Wallace, 1869 (Waigeu)
- C. c. damasippe C. & R. Felder, [1867] (New Guinea)
- C. c. doxata Fruhstorfer, 1913 (Goodenough Island)
- C. c. insulata Butler, 1873 (Kai Island)
- C. c. imperialis Butler, 1876 (Cape York to Townsville)
- C. c. iphigenia Fruhstorfer, 1901 (Buru)
- C. c. lucina Fruhstorfer, 1905 (Jobi)
- C. c. mysolensis Fruhstorfer, 1913 (Mysol Island)
- C. c. obiana Fruhstorfer, 1903 (Obi)
- C. c. sangira Fruhstorfer, 1906 (Sangihe?, Sangira Island)
- C. c. salwattensis Fruhstorfer, 1913 (Salwtti)
- C. c. schoutensis Joicey & Noakes, 1915 (Biak)
- C. c. woodlarkiana Fruhstorfer, 1902 (Woodlark Island)
