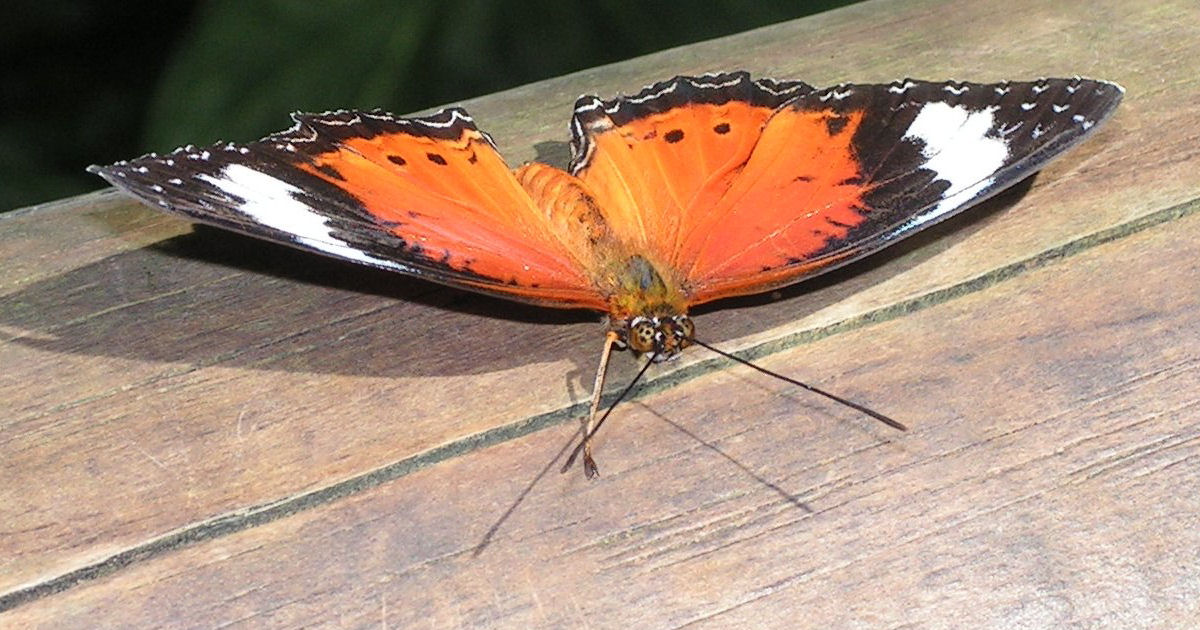
- Cethosia penthesilea paksha
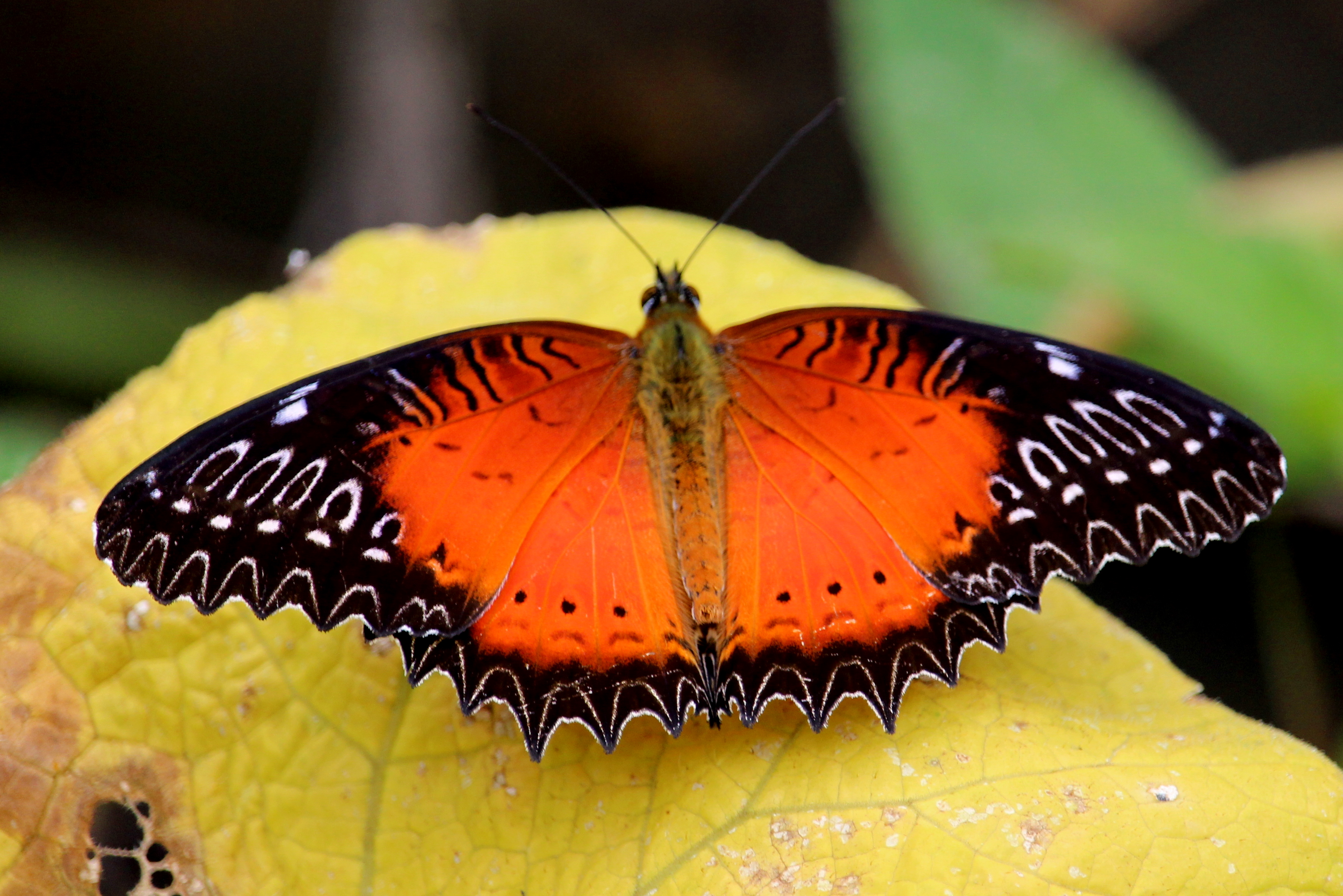
- Cethosia biblis

Scientific classification
- Kingdom: Animalia
- Phylum: Arthropoda
- Class: Insecta
- Order: Lepidoptera
- Family: Nymphalidae
- Tribe: Acraeini
- Genus: Cethosia; Fabricius, 1807

Species
- See text

Synonyms
- Alazonia Hübner, [1819]; Eugramma Billberg, 1820

= Cethosia =

Genus of brush-footed butterflies

Cethosia, commonly called the lacewings, is a genus of butterflies of the subfamily Heliconiinae in the family Nymphalidae. They are found mainly in southeastern Asia as far south as Australia.

== Species ==
Listed alphabetically:

- Cethosia biblis (Drury, [1773]) – red lacewing, common lacewing, or batik lacewing
- Cethosia cyane (Drury, [1773]) – leopard lacewing
- Cethosia cydippe (Linnaeus, 1767) – eastern red lacewing
- Cethosia hypsea Doubleday, [1847]
  - Cethosia hypsea hypsina (C. & R. Felder, 1867) – Malay lacewing
- Cethosia lamarcki Godart, 1819
- Cethosia luzonica C. & R. Felder, 1863 – Luzon lacewing
- Cethosia myrina C. & R. Felder, [1867] – violet lacewing
- Cethosia nietneri C. & R. Felder, [1867] – Tamil lacewing
- Cethosia obscura Guérin-Méneville, [1830]
- Cethosia penthesilea (Cramer, [1777])
  - C. p. methypsea (Butler, 1879) – plain lacewing
  - C. p. paksha (Fruhstorfer, 1905) – orange lacewing
- Cethosia tambora Doherty, 1891

=== Incertae sedis ===
- Cethosia moesta C. & R. Felder, [1867]
- Cethosia lechenaulti Godart, [1824]
- Cethosia gabinia Weymer, 1883
- Cethosia vasilia Müller, 1999
