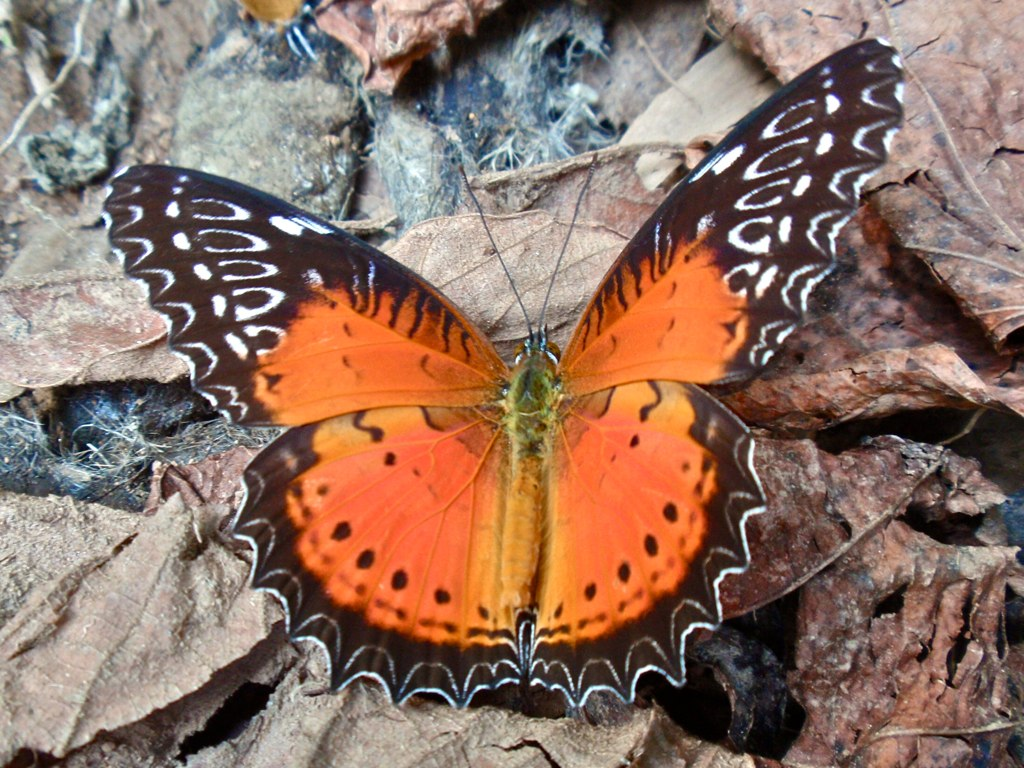

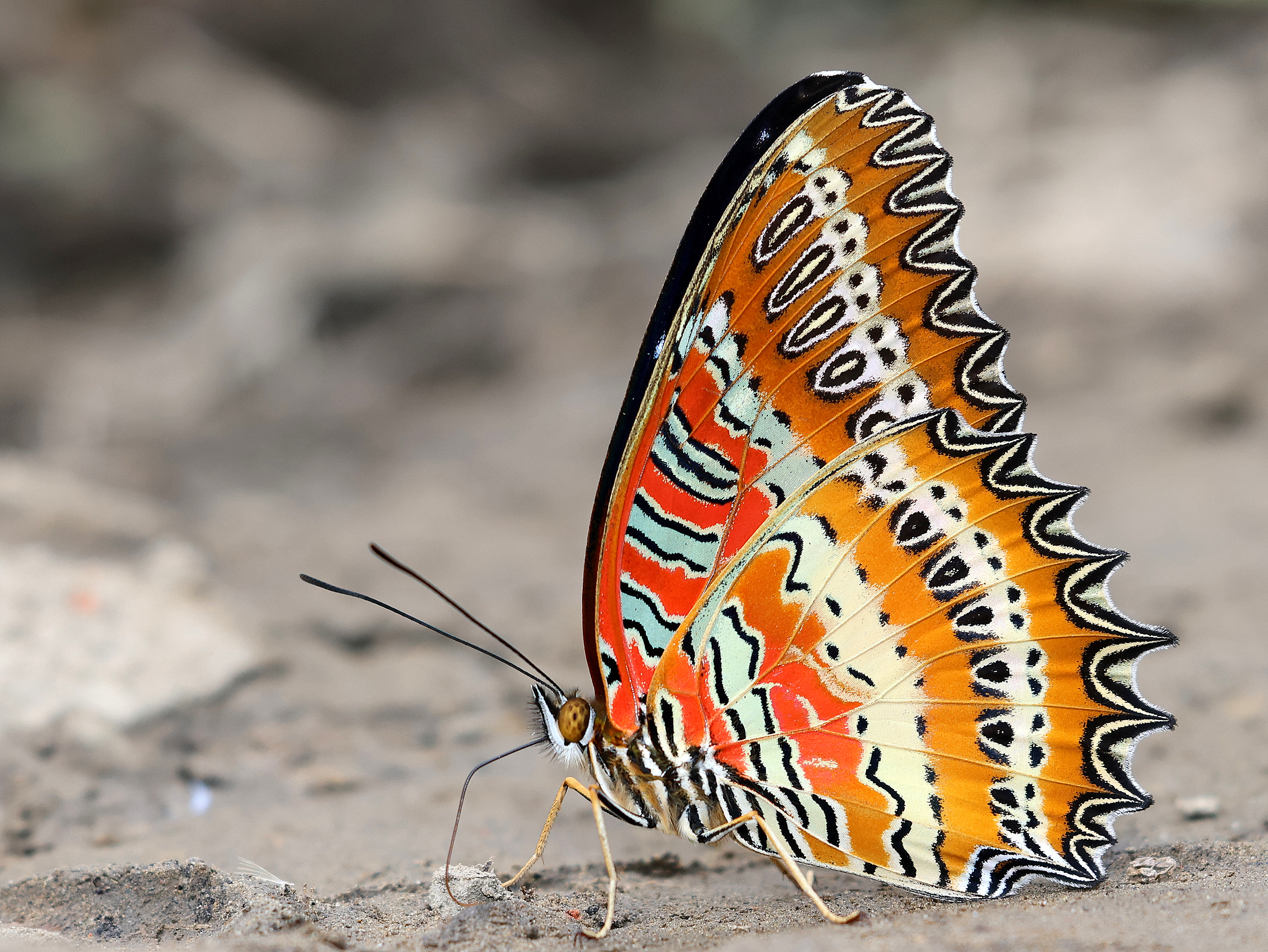

Scientific classification
- Kingdom: Animalia
- Phylum: Arthropoda
- Clade: Pancrustacea
- Class: Insecta
- Order: Lepidoptera
- Family: Nymphalidae
- Genus: Cethosia
- Species: C. biblis

Binomial name
- Cethosia biblis (Drury, 1773)

= Cethosia biblis =

Red lacewing

Species of butterfly

Cethosia biblis, the lacewing biblis or red lacewing, is a species of heliconiine butterfly belonging to the family Nymphalidae.

== Subspecies ==
- C. b. biblis - Assam, central India – south-western China
- C. b. insularis C. & R. Felder, 1861 - Philippines (Luzon, Polillo, ?Babuyanes)
- C. b. nicobarica Felder, 1862 - Nicobar?
- C. b. picta C. & R. Felder, [1867] - Sulawesi
- C. b. javana C. & R. Felder, [1867] - Java
- C. b. logani Distant, 1881 – eastern Sumatra
- C. b. tambora (Doherty, 1891) - Sumbawa
- C. b. narmada Fruhstorfer, 1896 - Lombok
- C. b. narmadoides de Nicéville, 1898 - Bali
- C. b. perakana Fruhstorfer, 1902 – southern Thailand, Peninsular Malaya, Pulau Tioman
- C. b. ceramensis Fruhstorfer, 1902 - Serang
- C. b. atia Fruhstorfer, 1905 - Kalao
- C. b. alceste Fruhstorfer, 1905 - Bawean
- C. b. hainana Fruhstorfer, 1908 - Hainan
- C. b. tisamena Fruhstorfer, 1912 - India
- C. b. phanaroia Fruhstorfer - Hong Kong
- C. b. adantonia Fruhstorfer – western Sumatra
- C. b. sumbana Pagenstecher - Sumba
- C. b. floresiana Fruhstorfer - Flores
- C. b. sandakana Fruhstorfer - Borneo, ?Palawan
- C. b. liacura Fruhstorfer - Philippines (Mindanao)
- C. b. tagalorum Fruhstorfer - Philippines (Mindoro)
- C. b. togiana Fruhstorfer - Togian Islands
- C. b. buruana Holland - Buru
- C. b. amboinensis C. & R. Felder, [1867] - Ambon
- C. b. andamanica Stichel - Andaman?
- C. b. pemanggilensis Eliot, 1978 – Pemanggil

The subspecies of Cethosia-biblis found in India are-

- Cethosia biblis tisamena Fruhstorfer, 1912 – Himalayan Red Lacewing
- Cethosia biblis andamanica Stichel, 1902 – Andaman Red Lacewing
- Cethosia biblis nicobarica Felder, 1862 – Nicobar Red Lacewing

== Distribution ==
This species can be found from the Indian subcontinent eastwards to South-East Asia and East Asia, the eastern limit being the Philippines, and the southern limit being Indonesia.

== Description ==
Cethosia biblis is a medium-sized butterfly, with a wingspan reaching about 8–9 cm (3.1–3.5 in). In this species, the sexes are dimorphic. The dorsal sides of the male wings are bright orange-red, framed by a black outline with white spots. The undersides range from bright red to pale brown, interlaced by black and white. This astonishing pattern helps to disguise the shape of the butterfly, while the intense colour of the dorsal sides of the wings is a warning to predators that the red lacewing has a bad taste, deriving from the poisonous host plants of the caterpillars. The dorsal sides of the female wings are greyish-brown, with black spots and white bands and spots on the black margins.

Caterpillars have several reddish, black, and white stripes, a black head and long black spikes that contain poison. In fact they mainly feed on poisonous climbing plants, mainly Passiflora species (P. cochinchinensis, P. moluccana, etc.).

== Gallery ==
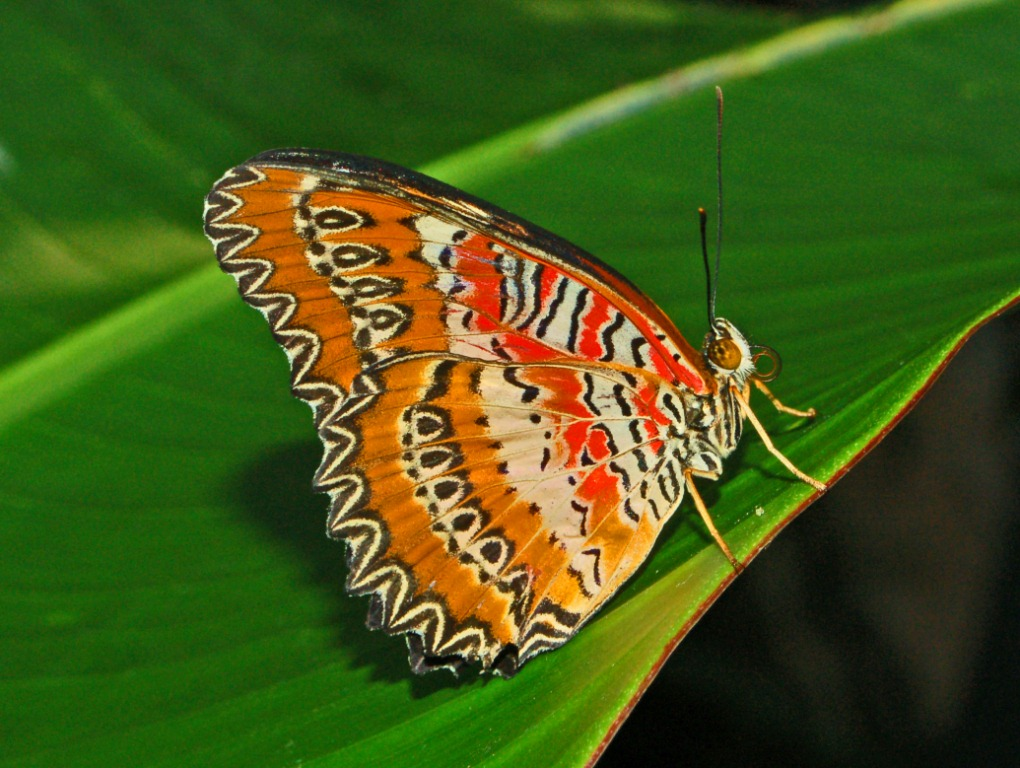
C. biblis. Side view

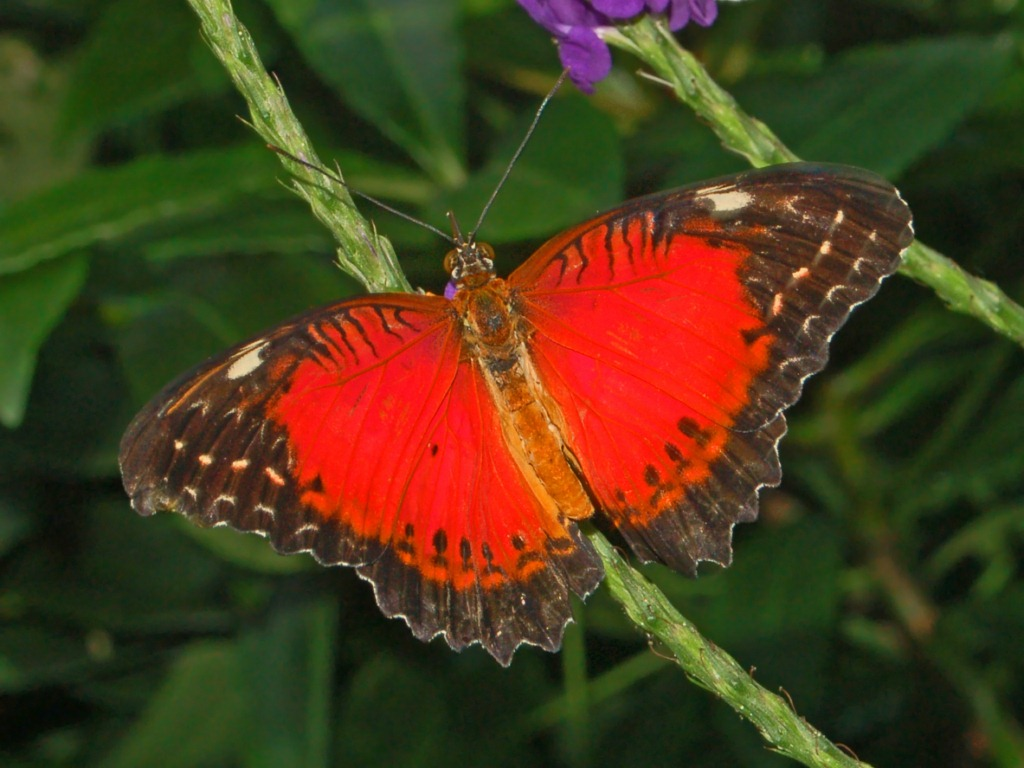
Dorsal view

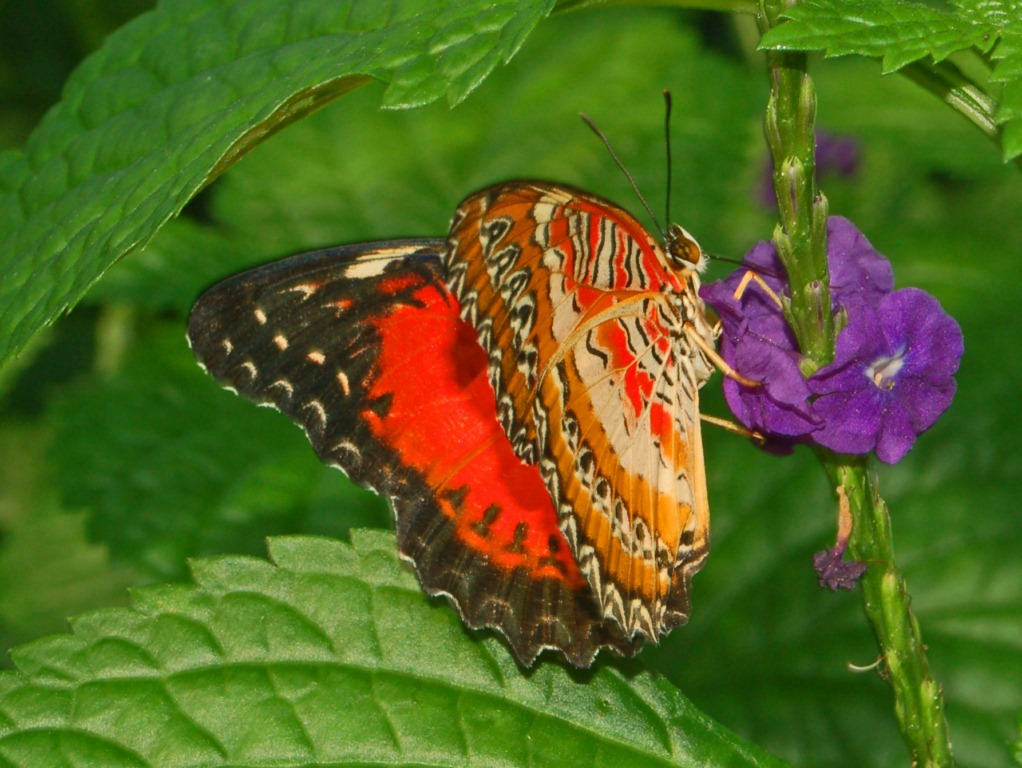
At Niagara Parks Butterfly Conservatory

C. biblis in Singapore. Video clip
