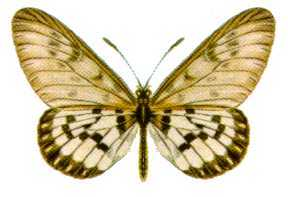

Scientific classification
- Kingdom: Animalia
- Phylum: Arthropoda
- Clade: Pancrustacea
- Class: Insecta
- Order: Lepidoptera
- Family: Nymphalidae
- Genus: Acraea
- Species: A. andromacha

Binomial name
- Acraea andromacha (Fabricius, 1775)

Synonyms
- Papilio andromacha; Acraea entoria; Acraea theodote; Acraea andromache

= Acraea andromacha =

Glasswing

Species of butterfly

Acraea andromacha, the glasswing or small greasy, is a butterfly of the family Nymphalidae. It is found in Australia, New Guinea and surrounding islands.

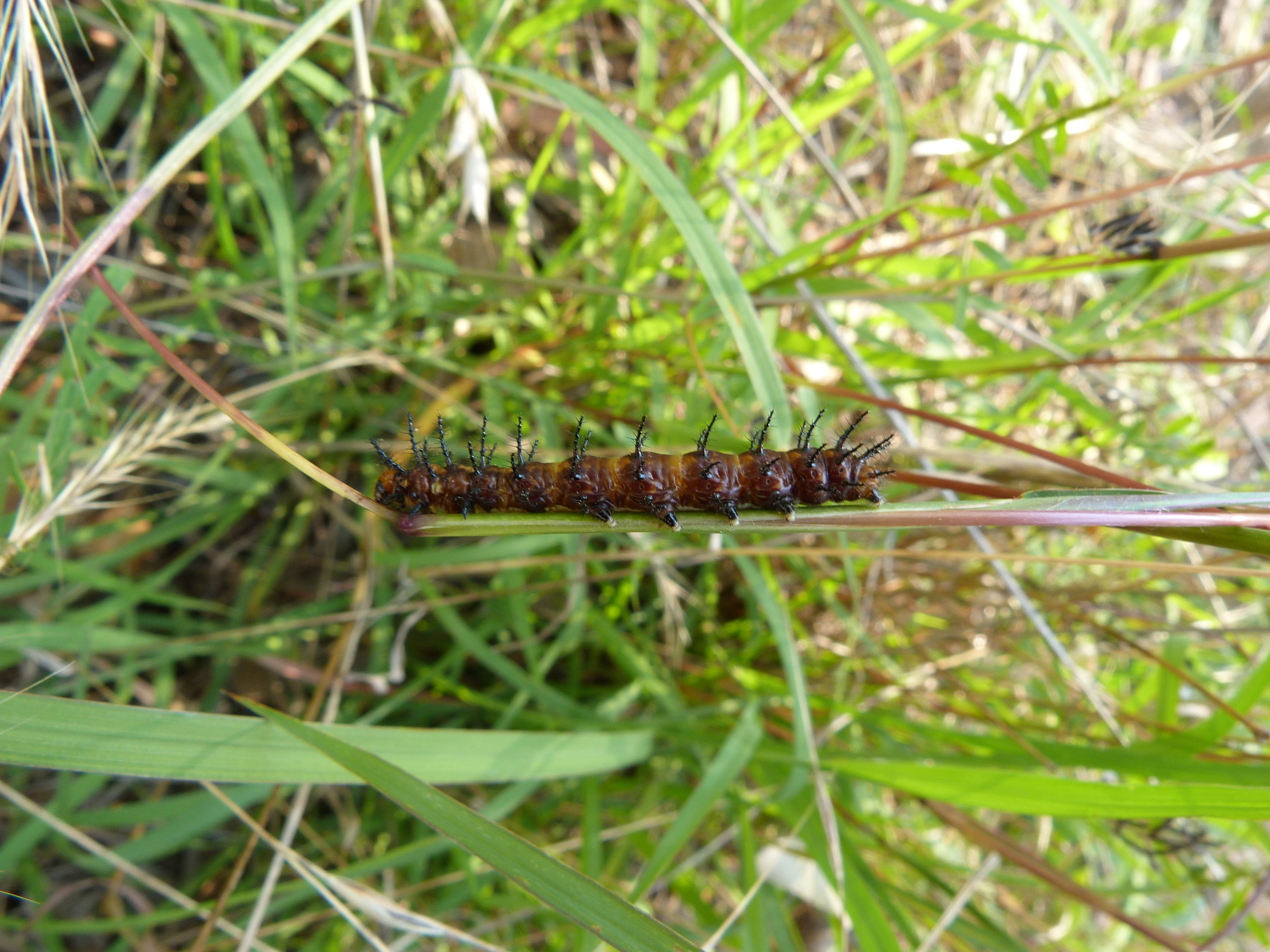
Larva

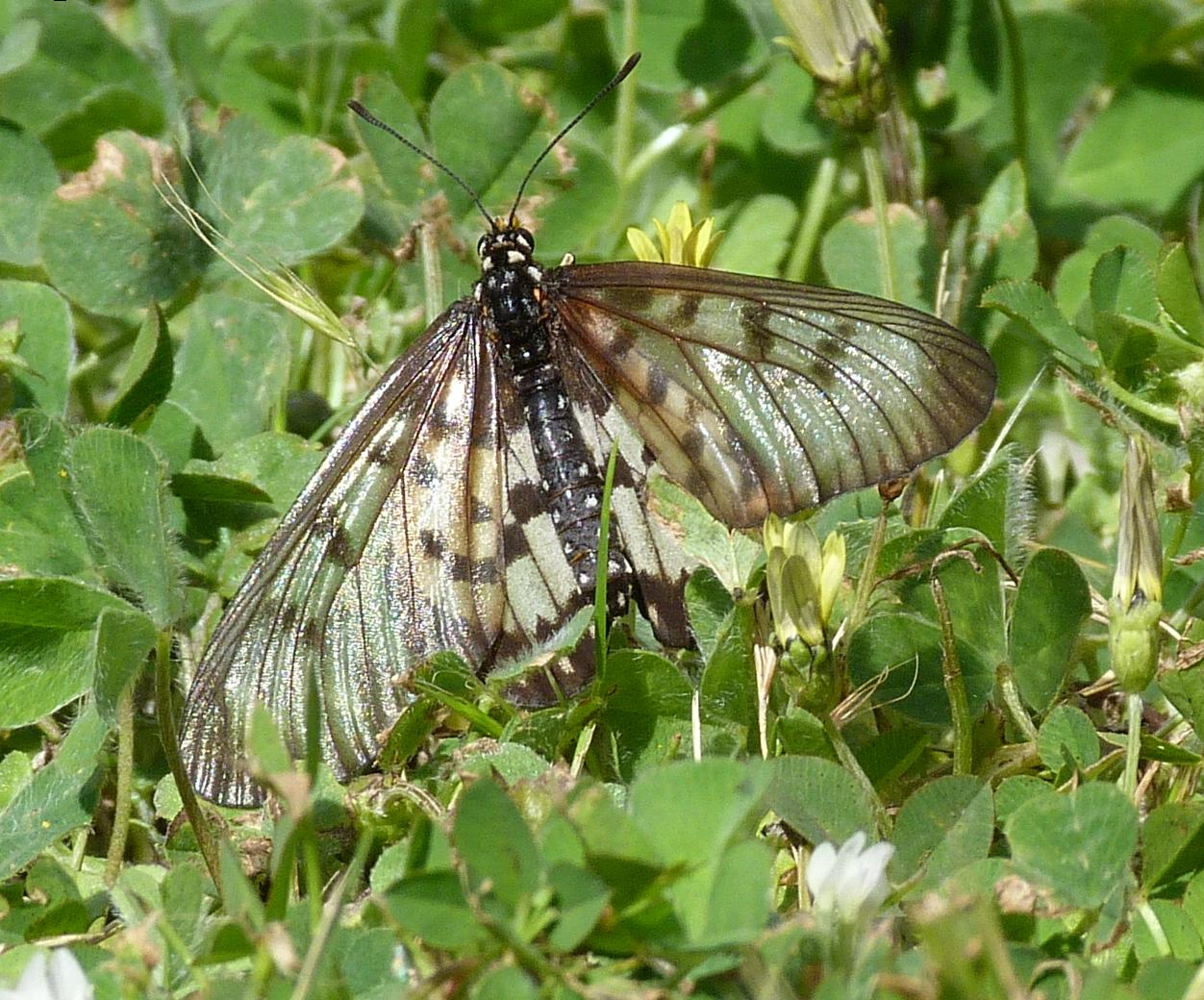
Imago

== Subspecies ==
- Acraea andromacha andromacha (Timor Sea, Northern Australia to New South Wales)
- Acraea andromacha sanderi Rothschild, 1893 (Papua New Guinea)
- Acraea andromacha oenome Kirby, 1889 (Islands of South-Eastern coast of Papua)
