= Passiflora aurantioides =

Scientific classification
- Kingdom: Plantae
- Clade: Tracheophytes
- Clade: Angiosperms
- Clade: Eudicots
- Clade: Rosids
- Order: Malpighiales
- Family: Passifloraceae
- Genus: Passiflora
- Species: P. aurantioides

Binomial name
- Passiflora aurantioides (K.Schum.) Krosnick

Synonyms
- Hollrungia aurantioides K.Schum.

Species of plant

Passiflora aurantioides is a species of passion flower native to the region from the Maluku Islands, Indonesia, to Papuasia and Queensland, Australia.

== Description ==
The petiolate, 11–12 cm long and 7 cm wide leaves are alternate. The flowers are bisexual. The pedicel is 8–10 mm long. The arillate, obovate, black seeds are 2–3 mm thick.

== Taxonomy ==
It was first described by Karl Moritz Schumann as Hollrungia aurantioides K.Schum. of a new monotypic genus Hollrungia K.Schum. in 1887. Later it was transferred to the genus Passiflora L. as Passiflora aurantioides (K.Schum.) Krosnick by Shawn Elizabeth Krosnick in 2009. The type specimen was collected by Max Hollrung in Papua New Guinea. It was destroyed. A neotype, and isoneotype was chosen.
